= List of schools in South Australia =

This is a list of all schools, both open and closed, in South Australia:

== Government schools ==
=== Aboriginal schools ===
Anangu Schools are located in Anangu Pitjantjatjara Yankunytjatjara, Maralinga Tjarutja and Yalata in the far west of South Australia where Aboriginal people refer to themselves as Anangu.

Name	Suburb	Opened	Notes
Amata Anangu School	Amata		
Carlton School	Port Augusta		
Ernabella Anangu School	Pukatja		
Fregon Anangu School	Kaltjiti		
Indulkana Anangu School	Indulkana		
Kalaya Children's Centre	Queenstown		Preschool/Kindergarten
Kaurna Plains School	Elizabeth		
Kenmore Park Anangu School	Yunyarinyi		
Koonibba Aboriginal School	Koonibba		
Marree Aboriginal School	Marree		
Mimili Anangu School	Mimili		
Murputja Anangu School	Murputia		
Oak Valley Anangu School	Oak Valley		
Oodnadatta Aboriginal School	Oodnadatta		
Pipalyatjara Anangu School	Pipalyatjara		
Raukkan Aboriginal School	Raukkan		
Warriappendi Secondary School	Thebarton		
Yalata Anangu School	Yalata		

=== Government primary schools ===
Primary Schools (R–6) operated by the South Australian government. Prior to 2022 many of these were R–7, but in 2022, year 7 became part of high school and primary schools shifted to R–6.

Name	Suburb	Opened	Notes
Aberfoyle Hub Primary School	Aberfoyle Park		
Airdale Primary School	Port Pirie		
Alberton Primary School	Queenstown		
Aldgate Primary School	Aldgate		
Aldinga Beach Primary School	Aldinga		
Allenby Gardens Primary School	Allenby Gardens		
Andamooka Primary School	Andamooka		
Angaston Primary School	Angaston		
Angle Vale Primary School	Angle Vale		
Ardtornish Primary School	St Agnes		
Ascot Park Primary School	Holme		
Athelstone School	Athelstone		
Auburn Primary School	Auburn		
Augusta Park Primary School	Port Augusta		
Balaklava Primary School	Balaklava		
Banksia Park School	Banksia Park		
Barmera Primary School	Barmera		
Basket Range Primary School	Basket Range		
Beachport Primary School	Beachport		
Belair Primary School	Belair		
Bellevue Heights Primary School	Bellevue Heights		
Berri Primary School	Berri		
Birdwood Primary School	Birdwood		
Black Forest Primary School	Black Forest		
Blackwood Primary School	Eden Hills		
Blair Athol North B–6 School	Blair Athol		
Blakeview Primary School	Blakeview		
Blanchetown Primary School	Blanchetown		
Blyth Primary School	Blyth		
Booborowie Primary School	Booborowie		
Bordertown Primary School	Bordertown		
Braeview School	Happy Valley		
Brahma Lodge Primary	Brahma Lodge		
Bridgewater Primary School	Bridgewater		
Brighton Primary School	Brighton		
Brinkworth Primary And Early Childhood Centre	Brinkworth		
Brompton Primary School	Renown Park		
Burnside Primary School	Burnside		
Burton Primary School	Burton		
Bute Early Learning And Primary School	Bute		
Callington Primary School	Callington		
Campbelltown Primary School	Paradise		
Cambrai Primary School	Cambrai		
Challa Gardens Primary School	Kilkenny		
Christie Downs Primary School	Christie Downs		
Christies Beach Primary School	Christies Beach		
Clapham Primary School	Clapham		
Clare Primary School	Clare		
Clarendon Primary School	Clarendon		
Clovelly Park Primary School	Clovelly Park		
Cobdogla Primary School	Cobdogla		
Colonel Light Gardens Primary School	Colonel Light Gardens		
Compton Primary School	Suttontown		
Coorara Primary School	Morphett Vale		
Coromandel Valley Primary School	Coromandel Valley		
Cowandilla Primary School	Cowandilla		
Crafers Primary School	Crafers		
Craigburn Primary School	Flagstaff Hill		
Craigmore South Primary School	Craigmore		
Crystal Brook Primary School	Crystal Brook		
Curramulka Primary School	Curramulka		
Darlington Primary School	Seacombe Gardens		
Dernancourt School	Dernancourt		
East Adelaide School	St Peters		
East Marden Primary School	Campbelltown		
East Para Primary School	Para Hills		
East Torrens Primary School	Hectorville		
Echunga Primary And Preschool	Echunga		
Eden Hills Primary School	Eden Hills		
Edwardstown Primary School	Melrose Park		
Elizabeth Downs Primary School	Elizabeth Downs		
Elizabeth East Primary School	Elizabeth East		
Elizabeth Grove Primary School	Elizabeth Grove		
Elizabeth North Primary School	Elizabeth North		
Elizabeth Park Primary School	Elizabeth Park		
Elizabeth South Primary School	Elizabeth South		
Elizabeth Vale Primary School	Elizabeth Vale		
Enfield Primary School	Enfield		
Evanston Gardens Primary School	Evanston Gardens		
Fairview Park Primary School	Fairview Park		
Felixstow Primary School	Felixstow		
Fisk Street Primary School	Whyalla Norrie		
Flagstaff Hill Primary School	Flagstaff Hill		
Flaxmill School	Morphett Vale		
Flinders Park Primary School	Flinders Park		
Flinders View Primary School	Port Augusta West		
Forbes Primary School	South Plympton		
Frances Primary School	Frances		
Fraser Park Primary School	Murray Bridge		
Freeling Primary School	Freeling		
Fulham Gardens Primary School	Henley Beach		
Fulham North Primary School	Henley Beach		
Gawler East Primary School	Gawler East		
Gawler Primary School	Gawler		
Gilles Street Primary School	Adelaide		
Gladstone Primary School	Gladstone		
Glen Osmond Primary School	Myrtle Bank		
Glenburnie Primary School	Glenburnie		
Glencoe Central Primary School	Glencoe		
Glenelg Primary School	Glenelg East		
Glossop Community School	Glossop		
Golden Grove Primary School	Golden Grove		
Goodwood Primary School	Goodwood	1879	
Good Shepherd Para Vista Primary School	Para Vista		
Goolwa Primary School	Goolwa		
Grange Primary School	Grange		
Greenock Primary School	Greenock		
Greenwith Primary School	Greenwith		
Gulfview Heights Primary School	Gulfview Heights		
Gumeracha Primary School	Gumeracha		
Hackham East Primary School	Hackham		
Hackham West School	Hackham West		
Hahndorf Primary School	Hahndorf		
Hallett Cove East Primary School	Hallett Cove		
Hallett Cove South Primary School	Hallett Cove		
Hamley Bridge Primary School	Hamley Bridge		
Hampstead Primary School	Greenacres		
Happy Valley Primary School	Happy Valley		
Hawthorndene Primary School	Hawthorndene		
Heathfield Primary School	Heathfield		
Hendon Primary School	Royal Park		
Henley Beach Primary School	Henley Beach South		
Hewett Primary School	Hewett		
Highbury Primary School	Hope Valley		
Highgate School	Highgate		
Hillcrest Primary School	Hillcrest		
Hincks Avenue Primary School	Whyalla Norrie		
Huntfield Heights School	Huntfield Heights		
Ingle Farm East Primary School	Ingle Farm		
Ingle Farm Primary School	Ingle Farm		
Jervois Primary School	Jervois		
John Hartley School	Smithfield Plains		
Kalangadoo Primary School	Kalangadoo		
Kangarilla Primary School	Kangarilla		
Kapunda Primary School	Kapunda		
Karrendi Primary School	Parafield Gardens		
Keithcot Farm Primary School	Wynn Vale		
Keller Road Primary School	Salisbury East		
Kersbrook Primary School	Kersbrook		
Keyneton Primary School	Keyneton		
Kidman Park Primary School	Kidman Park		
Kilkenny Primary School	West Croydon		
Kingston-On-Murray Primary School	Kingston-On-Murray		
Kirton Point Primary School	Port Lincoln		
Klemzig Primary School	Klemzig		
Kongorong Primary School	Kongorong		
Koolunga Primary School	Koolunga		
Lake Wangary School	Wangary		
Lake Windemere B–6 School	Salisbury North		
Largs Bay School	Largs Bay		
Laura Primary School	Laura		
Le Fevre Peninsula Primary School	Birkenhead	1878	
Lenswood Primary School	Lenswood		
Light Pass Primary School	Light Pass		
Lincoln Gardens Primary School	Port Lincoln		
Linden Park Primary School	Linden Park		
Littlehampton Primary School	Littlehampton		
Lobethal Primary School	Lobethal		
Lockleys North Primary School	Lockleys		
Lockleys Primary School	Brooklyn Park		
Long Street Primary School	Whyalla Norrie		
Lonsdale Heights Primary School	Christie Downs		
Loxton North School	Loxton North		
Loxton Primary School	Loxton		
Lyndoch Primary School	Lyndoch		
Macclesfield Primary School	Macclesfield		
Madison Park School	Salisbury East		
Magill School	Magill		
Mallala Primary School	Mallala		
Manoora Primary School	Manoora		
Marion Primary School	Marion		
Marryatville Primary School	Kensington		
Mawson Lakes School	Mawson Lakes		
Mcdonald Park School	Mount Gambier		
Mclaren Flat Primary School	McLaren Flat		
Mclaren Vale Primary School	McLaren Vale		
Meadows Primary School	Meadows		
Melaleuca Park Primary School	Mount Gambier		
Melrose Primary School	Melrose		
Memorial Oval Primary School	Whyalla		
Mil Lel Primary School	Mil Lel		
Millicent North Primary School	Millicent		
Mitcham Primary School	Kingswood		
Moana Primary School	Seaford		
Modbury School	Modbury North		
Modbury South Primary School	Hope Valley		
Modbury West School	Modbury		
Monash Primary And Preschool	Monash		
Moorak Primary School	Moorak		
Moorook Primary School	Moorook		
Morgan Primary School	Morgan		
Morphett Vale East School	Morphett Vale		
Morphett Vale Primary School	Morphett Vale		
Mount Barker Primary School	Mount Barker		
Mount Barker South Primary School	Mount Barker		
Mount Burr Primary School	Mount Burr		
Mount Gambier North Primary School	Mount Gambier		
Mount Pleasant Primary School	Mount Pleasant		
Mulga Street Primary School	Mount Gambier		
Mundulla Primary School	Mundulla		
Munno Para Primary School	Munno Para		
Murray Bridge North School	Murray Bridge		
Murray Bridge South Primary School	Murray Bridge		
Mylor Primary School	Mylor		
Mypolonga Primary School	Mypolonga		
Myponga Primary School	Myponga		
Nailsworth Primary School	Nailsworth		
Nairne Primary School	Nairne		
Nangwarry Primary School	Nangwarry		
Napperby Primary School	Napperby		
Naracoorte Primary School	Naracoorte		
Naracoorte South Primary School	Naracoorte		
Newbery Park Primary School	Millicent		
Nicolson Avenue Primary School	Whyalla Norrie		
Noarlunga Downs Primary School	Noarlunga Downs		
North Adelaide Primary School	North Adelaide		
North Haven School	North Haven		
North Ingle School	Ingle Farm		
Northfield Primary School	Northfield		
Norton Summit Primary School	Norton Summit		
Norwood Primary School	Norwood		
Nuriootpa Primary School	Nuriootpa		
Old Noarlunga Primary School	Old Noarlunga		
One Tree Hill Primary School	One Tree Hill		Formerly Ulebury School
O'sullivan Beach Primary School	O'Sullivan Beach		
Owen Primary School	Owen		
Padthaway Primary School	Padthaway		
Palmer Primary School	Palmer		
Para Hills School	Para Hills		
Para Hills West Primary School	Para Hills West		
Para Vista Primary School	Para Vista		
Paracombe Primary And Preschool	Paracombe		
Paradise Primary School	Paradise		
Parafield Gardens Primary School	Parafield Gardens		
Paringa Park Primary School	North Brighton		
Parkside Primary School	Parkside		
Pennington School	Pennington		
Penola Primary School	Penola		
Penong Primary School	Penong		
Peterborough Primary School	Peterborough		
Pimpala Primary School	Morphett Vale		
Pinnaroo Primary School	Pinnaroo		
Playford Primary School	Craigmore		
Plympton Primary School	Plympton		
Poonindie Community Learning Centre	Poonindie		
Pooraka Primary School	Pooraka		
Port Augusta West Primary School	Port Augusta		
Port Elliot Primary School	Port Elliot		
Port Lincoln Junior Primary School	Port Lincoln		Years R-2
Port Lincoln Primary School	Port Lincoln		Years 3-6
Port Neill Primary School	Port Neill		
Port Noarlunga Primary School	Port Noarlunga		
Port Pirie West Primary School	Port Pirie		
Port Wakefield Primary School	Port Wakefield		
Prospect North Primary School	Prospect		
Prospect Primary School	Prospect		
Ramco Primary School	Ramco		
Rapid Bay Primary School	Rapid Bayy		
Redwood Park Primary School	Redwood Park		
Reidy Park Primary School	Mount Compass		
Rendelsham Primary School	Rendelsham		
Renmark North School	Renmark North		
Renmark Primary School	Renmark		
Renmark West Primary School	Renmark		
Reynella Primary School	Reynella		
Reynella South Primary School	Reynella		
Richmond Primary School	Keswick		
Ridgehaven Primary School	Ridgehaven		
Risdon Park Primary School	Port Pirie		
Riverdale Primary School	Salisbury Downs		
Riverton Primary School	Riverton		
Robe Primary School	Robe		
Robertstown Primary School	Robertstown		
Rose Park Primary School	Rose Park		
Roseworthy Primary School	Roseworthy		
Saddleworth Primary School	Saddleworth		
Salisbury Downs Primary School	Salisbury Downs		
Salisbury Heights Primary School	Salisbury Heights		
Salisbury North Primary School	Salisbury North		
Salisbury Park Primary School	Salisbury Park		
Salisbury Primary School	Salisbury		
Sandy Creek Primary School	Cockatoo Valley		
Scott Creek Primary School	Scott Creek		
Seacliff Primary School	Seacliff		
Seaford Rise Primary School	Seaford Rise		
Seaton Park Primary School	Seaton		
Seaview Downs Primary School	Seaview Downs		
Settlers Farm Campus	Paralowie		
Sheidow Park Primary School	Sheidow Park		
Snowtown Primary School	Snowtown		Formerly Snowtown Area School
Solomontown Primary School	Port Pirie		
South Downs Primary School	Elizabeth Downs		
South Port Primary School	Port Noarlunga		
Spalding Primary School	Spalding		
Springton Primary School	Springton		
St Agnes School	St Agnes		
St Leonards Primary School	Glenelg North		
Stansbury Primary School	Stansbury		
Stirling East Primary School	Stirling		
Stirling North Primary School	Stirling North		
Stradbroke School	Rostrevor		
Sturt Street Community School	Adelaide		
Surrey Downs Primary School	Surrey Downs		
Suttontown Primary School	Suttontown		
Swallowcliffe School	Davoren Park		
Tailem Bend Primary School	Tailem Bend		
Tanunda Primary School	Tanunda		
Tarlee Primary School	Tarlee		
Tea Tree Gully Primary School	Tea Tree Gully		
The Pines School	Parafield Gardens		
Thiele Primary School	Aberfoyle Park		
Thorndon Park Primary School	Athelstone		
Torrensville Primary School	Torrensville		
Trinity Gardens School	Trinity Gardens		
Truro Primary School	Truro		
Two Wells Primary School	Two Wells		
Ungarra Primary School	Ungarra		
Unley Primary School	Unley		
Upper Sturt Primary School	Upper Sturt		
Uraidla Primary School	Uraidla		
Vale Park Primary School	Vale Park		
Victor Harbor Primary School	Victor Harbor		
Virginia Primary School	Virginia		
Waikerie Primary School	Waikerie		
Walkerville Primary School	Walkerville		
Wallaroo Mines Primary School	Kadina		
Wallaroo Primary School	Wallaroo		
Wandana Primary School	Gilles Plains		
Warooka Primary School	Warooka		
Warradale Primary School	Warradale		
Wasleys Primary School	Wasleys		
Watervale Primary School	Watervale		
West Beach Primary School	West Beach		
West Lakes Shore School	West Lakes Shore		
Westbourne Park Primary School	Westbourne Park		
Westport Primary School	Semaphore Park		
Whyalla Stuart Primary School	Whyalla Stuart		
Whyalla Town Primary School	Whyalla		
Williamstown Primary School	Williamstown		
Willsden Primary School	Port Augusta		
Willunga Primary School	Willunga		
Wilmington Primary School	Wilmington		
Woodcroft Primary School	Woodcroft		
Woodend Primary School	Sheidow Park		
Woodside Primary School	Woodside		
Woodville Gardens School	Woodville Gardens		
Woodville Primary School	Woodville South		
Wynn Vale School	Wynn Vale		
Yahl Primary School	Yahl		

=== Government secondary and R–12 schools ===
Secondary schools (7–12), operated by the South Australian government. From 2022, year 7 will be part of high school.

Name	Suburb	Opened	Notes
Aberfoyle Park High School	Aberfoyle Park	1984	A special interest high school focusing on Ignite: Students with High Intellectual Potential
Adelaide Botanic High School	Adelaide	2019	A special interest high school focusing on Science, Technology, Engineering and Mathematics (STEM)
Adelaide High School	Adelaide	1908	A special interest high school focusing on Language
Adelaide Secondary School of English	West Croydon	1998	
Aldinga Payinthi College	Aldinga	2022	
Allendale East Area School	Allendale East		
Ardrossan Area School	Ardrossan		
Australian Science and Mathematics School	Bedford Park	2003	A special interest high school focusing on Science and Mathematics
Avenues College	Windsor Gardens		merger of Windsor Gardens Secondary College, Gilles Plains Primary School, and Gilles Plains Children's Centre
Balaklava High School	Balaklava		
Banksia Park International High School	Banksia Park	1973	
Berri Regional Secondary College	Berri		Formerley Glossop High School, A special interest high school focusing on academic achievement and vocational studies
Birdwood High School	Birdwood	1909	
Blackwood High School	Eden Hills	1961	A special interest high school focusing on Netball
Booleroo Centre District School	Booleroo Centre		
Bordertown High School	Bordertown	1959	
Bowden Brompton Community School	Brompton, Christies Beach And Salisbury		
Brighton Secondary School	North Brighton	1952	A special interest high school focusing on Music and Volleyball
Burra Community School	Burra		
Ceduna Area School	Ceduna		
Central Yorke School	Maitland and Point Pearce		
Charles Campbell College	Paradise	1992	A special interest high school focusing on Dance/Drama
Christies Beach High School and Southern Vocational College	Christie Downs		
Clare High School	Clare		
Cleve Area School	Cleve		
Coober Pedy Area School	Coober Pedy		
Coomandook Area School	Coomandook		
Cowell Area School	Cowell		An R–12 school focusing on Aquaculture
Craigmore High School	Blakeview		
Cummins Area School	Cummins		
Eastern Fleurieu School	Strathalbyn	1913	
Elliston Area School	Elliston		
Eudunda Area School	Eudunda		
Findon High School	Findon		
Gawler and District College	Evanston	2013	
Gladstone High School	Gladstone		
Glenunga International High School	Glenunga	1903	A special interest high school focusing on Ignite: Students with High Intellectual Potential
Golden Grove High School	Golden Grove	1989	A special interest high school focusing on Dance/Drama
Goolwa Secondary College	Goolwa		
Grant High School	Mount Gambier	1961	
Hallett Cove School	Hallett Cove	1987	
Hamilton Secondary College	Mitchell Park	1958	
Hawker Area School	Hawker		
Heathfield High School	Heathfield		A special interest high school focusing on Volleyball
Henley High School	Henley Beach	1958	A special interest high school focusing on Sport and Physical Education
Jamestown Community School	Jamestown		
John Pirie Secondary School	Port Pirie		
Kadina Memorial School	Kadina		
Kangaroo Inn Area School	Kangaroo Inn		
Kangaroo Island Community Education	Kingscote, Parndana And Penneshaw		
Kapunda High School	Kapunda		
Karcultaby Area School	Karcultaby		
Karoonda Area School	Karoonda		
Keith Area School	Keith		
Kimba Area School	Kimba		
Kingston Community School	Kingston		
Lameroo Regional Community School	Lameroo		
Le Fevre High School	Semaphore South		
Leigh Creek Area School	Leigh Creek		
Lock Area School	Lock		
Loxton High School	Loxton		
Lucindale Area School	Lucindale		
Mannum Community College	Mannum		
Marden Senior College	Marden		
Mark Oliphant College	Munno Para	2010	
Marryatville High School	Marryatville	1976	A special interest high school focusing on Music and Tennis
Meningie Area School	Meningie		
Millicent High School	Millicent		
Miltaburra Area School	Wirrulla		
Minlaton District School	Minlaton		
Mitcham Girls High School	Kingswood	1964	
Modbury High School	Modbury	1965	
Moonta Area School	Moonta		
Morialta Secondary College	Rostrevor	2023	
Mount Barker High School	Mount Barker	1908	
Mount Compass Area School	Mount Compass		
Mount Gambier High School	Mount Gambier		
Murray Bridge High School	Murray Bridge		
Naracoorte High School	Naracoorte		
Northern Adelaide Senior College	Elizabeth		
Norwood International High School	Magill		Formerly Norwood Morialta High School
Nuriootpa High School	Nuriootpa		
Oakbank School	Oakbank		
Ocean View P–12 College	Taperoo		Merger of Taperoo High School, Taperoo Primary School and Largs North Primary School in 2001
Open Access College	Marden		
Orroroo Area School	Orroroo		
Para Hills High School	Para Hills West		
Parafield Gardens High School	Parafield Gardens		
Paralowie School	Paralowie		
Penola High School	Penola		
Peterborough High School	Peterborough		
Playford International College	Elizabeth	1960	A special interest high school focusing on Music (formerly Fremont–Elizabeth City High School)
Plympton International College	Plympton		
Port Augusta Secondary School	Port Augusta		
Port Broughton Area School	Port Broughton		
Port Lincoln High School	Port Lincoln		
Quorn Area School	Quorn		
Renmark High School	Renmark	1925	
Reynella East College	Reynella East	2011	
Riverbanks College	Angle Vale		
Riverton And District High School	Riverton		
Roma Mitchell Secondary College	Gepps Cross	2011	Formerly Enfield High School and Gepps Cross Senior School
Roxby Downs Area School	Roxby Downs		
Salisbury East High School	Salisbury East		
Salisbury High School	Salisbury North	1959	
Seaford Secondary College	Seaford	1994	
Seaton High School	Seaton	1964	A special interest high school focusing on Baseball
Seaview High School	Seacombe Heights		A special interest high school focusing on Tennis
Springbank Secondary College	Pasadena	1965	A special interest high school focusing on basketball. (Previously Pasadena High School)
Streaky Bay Area School	Streaky Bay		
Swan Reach Area School	Swan Reach		
The Heights School	Modbury Heights	1977	A special interest high school focusing on Ignite: Students with High Intellectual Potential
Thebarton Senior College	Torrensville	1919	
Tintinara Area School	Tintinara		
Tumby Bay Area School	Tumby Bay		
Underdale High School	Underdale	1965	A special interest high school focusing on Soccer
Unley High School	Netherby	1910	
Urrbrae Agricultural High School	Netherby	1913	A special interest high school focusing on Agriculture
Valley View Secondary School	Para Vista		
Victor Harbor High School	Victor Harbor		
Waikerie High School	Waikerie		
Whyalla Secondary College	Whyalla Norrie	1943	
Willunga High School	Willunga	1969	
Wirreanda Secondary School	Morphett Vale	1977	A special interest high school focusing on Sport and Physical Education
Woodville High School	St Clair	1915	A special interest high school focusing on Music
Woomera Area School	Woomera		
Wudinna Area School	Wudinna		
Yankalilla Area School	Yankalilla		
Yorketown Area School	Yorketown		

=== Government special schools ===
Name	Suburb	Opened	Notes
Adelaide East Education Centre	Campbelltown		
Adelaide North Special School	Munno Para West		
Adelaide West Special Education Centre	Taperoo		
Eastern Fleurieu R–12 School	Various		5 Campuses
Errington Special Education Centre	Plympton		
Gordon Education Centre	Mount Gambier		
Kilparrin Teaching And Assessment School And Services	Park Holme		
Mid North Education Centre	Port Pirie		
Modbury Special School	Hope Valley		
Murray Bridge Special School	Murray Bridge		
Port Augusta Special School	Port Augusta		
Port Lincoln Special School	Port Lincoln		
Riverland Special School	Berri		
SA School And Services For Vision Impaired	Park Holme		
The Grove Education Centre	Woodville		
Whyalla Special Education Centre	Whyalla Norrie		
Youth Education Centre	Various		3 Campuses

=== Defunct government schools ===
Name	Suburb	Type	Opened	Closed	Notes
Coonalpyn Primary School	Coonalpyn	Primary	1929	2022	
Croydon High School	West Croydon	High		2006	
Dover High School	Dover Gardens	High		1989	
Edward John Eyre High School	Whyalla Norrie	High	1968	2021	Merged with Whyalla High School and Stuart High School to form Whyalla Secondary College
Enfield High School	Enfield	High		2011	now part of Roma Mitchell Secondary College.
Ferryden Park Primary School	Ferryden Park	Primary		2010	merged into Woodville Gardens School
Fulham Primary School	Fulham	Primary	1960	1988	
Gepps Cross Girls High School	Gepps Cross	High		2011	now part of Roma Mitchell Secondary College.
Gepps Cross Senior School	Blair Athol	High		2011	now part of Roma Mitchell Secondary College.
Gilles Plains Primary School	Hillcrest	Primary	1901	2016	Amalgamated with Windsor Garden High School (Vocational College)
Glengowrie High School	Glengowrie	High		1990	
Houghton Primary School	Houghton	Primary	1878	2014	
Mansfield Park Primary School	Mansfield Park	Primary	1953	2010	merged into Woodville Gardens School
Marion High School	Clovelly Park	High		1996	
Morialta High School	Morialta	High	1975	1993	Merged into Norwood Morialta High School
Morphett Vale High School	Morphett Vale	High		2008	
Nailsworth High School	Nailsworth	High		1996	Nailsworth and Northfield High Schools amalgamated as Ross Smith Secondary School in 1996, Ross Smith Secondary School closed in 2011 and is now part of Roma Mitchell Secondary College.
Northfield High School	Northfield	High	1968	1996	Nailsworth and Northfield High Schools amalgamated as Ross Smith Secondary School in 1996, Ross Smith Secondary School closed in 2011 and is now part of Roma Mitchell Secondary College.
Norwood High School	Magill	High	1910	1993	Merged into Norwood Morialta High School
Port Adelaide Primary School	Port Adelaide	Primary	1862	2004	
Port Pirie High School	Port Pirie	High		1994	Merged into John Pirie Secondary School
Ridley Grove Primary School	Woodville Gardens	Primary		2010	merged into Woodville Gardens School
Risdon Park High School	Port Pirie	High		1994	Merged into John Pirie Secondary School
Ross Smith Secondary School	Northfield	High	1996	2011	now part of Roma Mitchell Secondary College.
Sedan Primary School	Sedan	Primary		2008	
Strathmont High School	Gilles Plains	High	1976	1988	merged to Windsor Gardens Vocational College
Strathmont Boys Technical High	Gilles Plains	High	1959	1976	merged to Strathmont High School
Strathmont Girls Technical High	Gilles Plains	High	1959	1976	merged to Strathmont High School
Stuart High School	Whyalla	High	1972	2021	merged into Whyalla Secondary College
Tantanoola Primary School	Tantanoola	Primary	1883	2020	Tantanoola Primary School
Windsor Gardens Vocational College	Windsor Gardens	Sacondary	1999	2017	merged into Avenues College
Whyalla High School	Whyalla	High	1943	2021	merged into Whyalla Secondary College

== Non-government schools ==
=== Catholic primary schools ===
Main articles: Catholic education in Australia and Roman Catholic Church in Australia

Name	Suburb	M/F/Co-ed	Opened	Notes
All Saints' Catholic Primary School	Seaford	Co-ed	1994	
Antonio Catholic School	Morphett Vale	Co-ed	1975	
Catherine McAuley School	Craigmore	Co-ed	1996	
Christ the King School	Warradale	Co-ed	1959	
Dominican School	Semaphore	Co-ed	1899	
Emmaus Catholic School	Woodcroft	Co-ed	1994	
Holy Family Catholic School	Parafield Gardens	Co-ed		
Immaculate Heart of Mary School	Brompton	Co-ed		
Mary MacKillop Memorial School	Penola	Co-ed	1866	
McAuley Community School	Hove	Co-ed	2020	
Our Lady of Grace School	Glengowrie	Co-ed		
Our Lady of Hope School	Greenwith	Co-ed	1994	
Our Lady of the River School	Berri	Co-ed		
Our Lady of the Visitation School	Taperoo	Co-ed		
Our Lady Queen of Peace School	Albert Park	Co-ed	1949	
Rosary School	Prospect	Co-ed	1908	
School of the Nativity	Aberfoyle Park	Co-ed	1982	
St Albert's School	Loxton	Co-ed	1956	
St Anthony's Primary School	Millicent	Co-ed	1898	
St Anthony's School	Edwardstown	Co-ed	1926	
St Augustine's Parish School	Salisbury	Co-ed	1950s	
St Benedict School	Mt Torrens	Co-ed	2024	
St Bernadette's School	St Marys	Co-ed	1952	
St Brigid's School	Kilburn	Co-ed	1929	
St Catherine's School	Stirling	Co-ed	1947	
St Columba's Memorial School	Yorketown	Co-ed	1957	
St David's Parish School	Tea Tree Gully	Co-ed	1977	
St Francis of Assisi School	Newton	Co-ed	1965	
St Francis School	Lockleys	Co-ed		
St Francis Xavier's Catholic School	Wynn Vale	Co-ed	1983	
St Gabriel's School	Enfield	Co-ed	1955	
St James School	Jamestown	Co-ed	1880	
St John Bosco School	Brooklyn Park	Co-ed	1954	
St John the Apostle School	Christies Beach	Co-ed	1965	
St John the Baptist Catholic School	Plympton	Co-ed	1935	
St Joseph's Memorial School	Kensington and Norwood	Co-ed	1872	
St Joseph's School	Gladstone	Co-ed	1891	
St Joseph's School	Barmera	Co-ed		
St Joseph's School	Hectorville	Co-ed	1863	
St Joseph's School	Kingswood	Co-ed	1870	
St Joseph's School	Ottoway	Co-ed	1954	
St Joseph's School	Payneham	Co-ed		
St Joseph's School	Renmark	Co-ed	1919	
St Joseph's School	Tranmere	Co-ed	1927	
St Joseph's School	West Hindmarsh	Co-ed	1928	
St Margaret Mary's School	Croydon Park	Co-ed		
St Martin de Porres School	Sheidow Park	Co-ed	1986	
St Martin's Primary School	Greenacres	Co-ed	1964	
St Mary Magdalene's School	Elizabeth Grove	Co-ed		
St Mary's Memorial School	Glenelg	Co-ed	1869	
St Monica's Parish School	Walkerville	Co-ed	1929	
St Patrick's School	Mansfield Park	Co-ed	1964	
St Pius X School	Windsor Gardens	Co-ed		
St Raphael's School	Parkside	Co-ed	1889	
St Teresa's Primary School	Colonel Light Gardens	Co-ed		
St Thomas More School	Elizabeth Park	Co-ed	1960	
St Thomas' School	Goodwood	Co-ed	1896	
Star of the Sea School	Henley Beach	Co-ed	1912	
Stella Maris Parish School	Seacombe Gardens	Co-ed	1956	
Tenison Woods Catholic School	Richmond	Co-ed	1995	
Whitefriars School	Woodville Park	Co-ed	1912	

=== Catholic secondary and R–12 schools ===
Name	Suburb	M/F/Co-ed	Opened	Notes
Blackfriars Priory School	Prospect	M	1953	
Cabra Dominican College	Cumberland Park	Co-ed	1886	
Cardijn College	Noarlunga Downs	Co-ed	1984	
Caritas College	Port Augusta	Co-ed	1927	
Christian Brothers College	Adelaide	M	1878	
Compass Catholic Community	Davoren Park	Co-ed		Alternative School
Edmund Rice Flexi School	Davoren Park and Elizabeth	Co-ed		Alternative School
FAME – Flexible Accredited Meaningful Engagement	Christie Downs and Morphett Vale	Co-ed		Special School
Gleeson College	Golden Grove	Co-ed	1989	
Kildare College	Holden Hill	F	1966	
Loreto College	Marryatville	F	1905	
Mary MacKillop College	Kensington	F	1944	
Mercedes College	Springfield	Co-ed	1954	
Mount Carmel College	Rosewater	Co-ed	1927	
Nazareth Catholic College	Flinders Park, Findon and Kidman Park	Co-ed	2007	
Our Lady of La Vang School	Flinders Park	Co-ed		Special School, formerly St Ann's Special School
Our Lady of the Sacred Heart College	Enfield	F	1951	
Rostrevor College	Woodforde	M	1923	
Sacred Heart College Senior	Somerton Park	Co-ed	1897	
Sacred Heart College Middle School	Mitchell Park	Co-ed	1967	
Samaritan College	Whyalla	Co-ed	2008	
St Aloysius College	Adelaide	F	1880	
St Barbara's Parish School	Roxby Downs	Co-ed	2000	
St Dominic's Priory College	North Adelaide	F	1883	
St Francis de Sales College	Mount Barker	Co-ed	1902	
St Francis of Assisi College	Renmark	Co-ed	2022	
St Ignatius College	Norwood and Athelstone	Co-ed	1951	
St Joseph's School	Port Lincoln	Co-ed	1926	
St Joseph's School	Clare	Co-ed	1849	
St Joseph's School	Murray Bridge	Co-ed	1925	
St Joseph's School	Peterborough	Co-ed	1884	
St Mark's College	Port Pirie	Co-ed	1975	
St Mary Mackillop School	Wallaroo	Co-ed	1869	
St Mary's College	Adelaide	F	1869	
St Michael's College	Beverley and Henley Beach	Co-ed	1951	
St Patrick's Special School	Dulwich	Co-ed		Special School
St Patrick's Technical College	Edinburgh North	Co-ed	2007	
St Paul's College	Gilles Plains	Co-ed	1959	
Tenison Woods College	Mount Gambier	Co-ed	1972	
Thomas More College	Salisbury Downs	Co-ed	1979	
Xavier College	Gawler	Co-ed	1995	

=== Independent schools ===
Name	Suburb	M/F/Co-ed	Category	Opened	Notes
Adelaide International School	Adelaide	Co-ed	Non-denominational		
Annesley Junior School	Wayville	Co-ed	Uniting	1902	Formerly Annesley College and Methodist Ladies College
Aspect Treetop School	Ashford	Co-ed	Special School	2016	
Australian Islamic College	West Croydon	Co-ed	Islamic	1997	
Bethany Christian School	Paralowie	Co-ed	Pentecostal	1981	
Blakes Crossing Christian College	Blakeview	Co-ed	Christian	2014	
Calvary Lutheran Primary School	Morphett Vale	Co-ed	Lutheran	1983	
Cedar College	Northgate	Co-ed	Baptist	1997	
Concordia College	Highgate	Co-ed	Lutheran	1890	
Cornerstone College	Mount Barker	Co-ed	Lutheran	1990	
Crossways Lutheran School	Ceduna	Co-ed	Lutheran	1983	
Dara School	Morphettville	Co-ed	Non-Denominational	2017	
Emmaus Christian College	South Plympton	Co-ed	Christian	1979	
Encounter Lutheran College	Victor Harbor	Co-ed	Lutheran	2001	
Endeavour College	Mawson Lakes	Co-ed	Lutheran	1998	
Faith Lutheran College	Tanunda	Co-ed	Lutheran	1985	Formerly Tanunda Lutheran School
Garden College	Parafield Gardens	Co-ed	Islamic		
Golden Grove Lutheran Primary School	Wynn Vale	Co-ed	Lutheran	1988	
Good Shepherd Lutheran School	Angaston	Co-ed	Lutheran	1962	
Good Shepherd Lutheran School	Para Vista	Co-ed	Lutheran	1981	
Harvest Christian College	Kadina	Co-ed	Christian	2000	
Heritage College	Oakden	Co-ed	Christadelphian	1996	
The Hills Christian Community School	Verdun	Co-ed	Christian	1983	
The Hills Montessori School	Aldgate	Co-ed	Montessori	1978	
Hope Christian College	Craigmore	Co-ed	Christian	1980	Formerly Craigmore Christian School
Horizon Christian College	Balaklava	Co-ed	Christian	1994	
Immanuel College	Novar Gardens	Co-ed	Lutheran	1895	
Immanuel Lutheran Primary School	Novar Gardens	Co-ed	Lutheran	1970	
Immanuel Lutheran School	Gawler	Co-ed	Lutheran		
Indie School	Elizabeth	Co-ed	Alternative		
Investigator College	Victor Harbor	Co-ed	Anglican	2002	
IQRA College	O'Halloran Hill	Co-ed	Islamic		
King's Baptist Grammar School	Wynn Vale	Co-ed	Baptist	1989	
Lobethal Lutheran School	Lobethal	Co-ed	Lutheran	1842	
Loxton Lutheran School	Loxton	Co-ed	Lutheran	1947	
Maitland Lutheran School	Maitland	Co-ed	Lutheran	1966	
Mid North Christian College	Port Pirie	Co-ed	Christian	2005	
Mount Barker Waldorf School	Mount Barker	Co-ed	Steiner	1979	
Mount Torrens Christian School	Mount Torrens	Co-ed	Christian	2016	Formerly Dominio Servite College
Muirden Senior Secondary College	Adelaide	Co-ed	Non-denominational	1900	
Navigator College	Port Lincoln	Co-ed	Lutheran	2009	
Ngutu College	Woodville North	Co-ed	Aboriginal	2021	
OneSchool Global SA	Aberfoyle Park and Mt Gambier	Co-ed	Exclusive Brethren		
Our Saviour Lutheran School	Aberfoyle Park	Co-ed	Lutheran	1986	
Pedare Christian College	Golden Grove	Co-ed	Uniting and Anglican	1986	
Pembroke School	Kensington Park	Co-ed	Non-denominational	1974	
Pilgrim School	Aberfoyle Park	Co-ed	Uniting	1982	
Pinnacle College	Golden Grove and Elizabeth	Co-ed	Islamic	1995	
Playford College	Elizabeth	Co-ed	Islamic	2017	
Portside Christian College	New Port	Co-ed	Christian	1976	
Prescott College	Prospect, Para Vista and Morphett Vale	Co-ed	Adventist	1906	
Prince Alfred College	Kent Town	M	Uniting	1869	
Pulteney Grammar School	Adelaide	Co-ed	Anglican	1847	
Redeemer Lutheran School	Nurioopta	Co-ed	Lutheran		
Rivergum Christian College	Glossop	Co-ed	Christian	1986	
Scotch College	Torrens Park	Co-ed	Uniting	1919	
Seaview Christian College	Port Augusta	Co-ed	Christian	2016	
Seymour College	Glen Osmond	F	Uniting	1922	Formerly Presbyterian Girls' College
Southern Montessori School	O'Sullivan Beach	Co-ed	Montessori	1983	
Southern Vales Christian College	Morphett Vale and Aldinga	Co-ed	Christian	1980	
Specialised Assistance School for Youth (SASY)	Adelaide and Thebarton	Co-ed	Alternative	2016	
Sports College SA	Various	Co-ed	Alternative		Formerley SEDA College SA
St Andrew's School	Walkerville	Co-ed	Anglican	1850	
St Columba College	Andrews Farm	Co-ed	Anglican and Catholic	1996	
St George College	Mile End	Co-ed	Greek Orthodox	1983	
St Jakobi Lutheran School	Lyndoch	Co-ed	Lutheran	1840s	
St John's Grammar School	Belair	Co-ed	Anglican	1958	
St John's Lutheran School	Eudunda	Co-ed	Lutheran	1872	
St Mark's Lutheran School	Mount Barker	Co-ed	Lutheran		
St Martins Lutheran College	Mount Gambier	Co-ed	Lutheran	1982	
St Michael's Lutheran School	Hahndorf	Co-ed	Lutheran	1839	
St Paul Lutheran School	Blair Athol	Co-ed	Lutheran	1973	
St Peter's College	Hackney	M	Anglican	1847	
St Peter's Collegiate Girls' School	Stonyfell	F	Anglican	1894	
St Peter's Woodlands Grammar School	Glenelg	Co-ed	Anglican	1863	
Saint Spyridon College	Unley	Co-ed	Greek Orthodox	2004	
Suneden Specialist School	Mitchell Park	Co-ed	Special School		
Sunrise Christian School	Fullarton	Co-ed	Pentecostal	1978	Six campuses: Fullarton, Marion, Morphett Vale, Paradise, Naracoorte and Whyalla.
Tatachilla Lutheran College	Tatachilla	Co-ed	Lutheran	1995	
Temple Christian College	Mile End & Paralowie	Co-ed	Pentecostal	1983	
Torrens Valley Christian School	Hope Valley	Co-ed	Christian	1980	
Trinity College	Gawler	Co-ed	Anglican	1984	
Tyndale Christian School	Salisbury East, Murray Bridge and Strathalbyn	Co-ed	Christian	1983	
Unity College	Murray Bridge	Co-ed	Lutheran	1978	Formerly Murray Bridge Lutheran School
University Senior College	Adelaide	Co-ed	Non-denominational		
Waikerie Lutheran Primary School	Waikerie	Co-ed	Lutheran		
Walford Anglican School for Girls	Hyde Park	F	Anglican	1893	
Westminster School	Marion Park	Co-ed	Uniting	1961	
Wilderness School	Medindie	F	Non-denominational	1884	
Willunga Waldorf School	Willunga	Co-ed	Steiner	1989	
Woodcroft College	Morphett Vale	Co-ed	Anglican	1989	
Youth Inc, Adelaide	Adelaide	Co-ed	Alternative		

=== Defunct non-government schools ===
Name	Suburb	Category	Opened	Closed	Notes
Cardinia Catholic School	Flinders Park	Catholic	1950	2007	Amalgamated into Nazareth Catholic College
Eynesbury Senior College	Adelaide	Non-denominational	1990	2021	
Girton Girls' School	Kensington Park	Non-Denominational	1915	1974	Amalgamated into Pembroke School
Kilmara School	Thebarton	Catholic	1885	1997	Originally a boys' school, St John the Baptist School, became co-ed in 1975 and was renamed Kilmara School. Merged into Tenison Woods Catholic School, Richmond.
King's College	Kensington Park	Non-Denominational	1923	1974	Amalgamated into Pembroke School
Kirinari Community School	Unley	Independent	1980	2017	
Knightsbridge School	Leabrook	Independent Girls	1886	1921	
Marbury School	Aldgate	Independent	1971	2004	
Marist Brothers Agricultural College	Mount Gambier	Catholic Boys	1931	1972	Amalgamated into Tenison Woods College
Marymount College	Hove	Catholic Girls	1956	2019	Became part of Sacred Heart College
Mater Christi School	Seaton	Catholic	1956	2007	Amalgamated into Nazareth Catholic College
Mater Christi College	Mount Gambier	Catholic Girls	1880	1972	Amalgamated into Tenison Woods College
Murraylands Christian College	Murray Bridge	Christian		2015	Also known as Murray Bridge Christian College; became part of Tyndale Christian School
North Adelaide Grammar School	North Adelaide	Independent Boys	1852	1896	Also known as Whinham College
Our Lady Help of Christians School	Whyalla Stuart	Catholic	1966	2007	Amalgamated into Samaritan College
Our Lady of Mount Carmel School	Pennington	Catholic	1909	2021	Became part of Mount Carmel College
Our Lady of the Manger School	Findon	Catholic	1949	2007	Amalgamated into Nazareth Catholic College
Queen's College	North Adelaide	Independent Boys	1891	1949	
Salesian College	Brooklyn Park	Catholic	1954	1996	
Salesian College	Port Pirie	Catholic Boys	1956	1975	Amalgamated into St Mark's College
Siena College	Findon	Catholic Girls	1971	2007	Amalgamated into Nazareth Catholic College
Spring Head Lutheran School	Mount Torrens	Lutheran	1931	2017	
St Aloysius College	Sevenhill	Catholic Boys	1856	1886	
St Francis Xavier Girls' School	Whyalla	Catholic Girls	1960	1975	Amalgamated into Samaritan College
St John's College	Whyalla	Catholic	1962	2008	Amalgamated into Samaritan College
St John's Lutheran Primary School	Highgate	Lutheran		2016	Became part of Concordia College
St Joseph's College	Mitchell Park	Catholic Boys	1967	1977	Became part of Sacred Heart College
St Joseph's School	Richmond	Catholic	1933	1997	Merged into Tenison Woods Catholic School, Richmond.
St Peters Lutheran School	Blackwood	Lutheran		2022	Became part of Concordia College
St Sava School	Kilkenny	Serbian Orthodox			
St Teresa's Primary School	Whyalla	Catholic	1942	2007	Amalgamated into Samaritan College
Stawell School	Mount Lofty	Independent Girls	1927	1940	
Tanunda Lutheran School	Tanunda	Lutheran	1938	2017	Now part of Faith Lutheran College
Tormore House School	North Adelaide	Independent Girls	1876	1920	
Vineyard Lutheran School	Clare	Lutheran		2022	
Whyalla Christian School	Whyalla	Christian		2010	Now part of Sunrise Christian School
Woodlands CEGGS	Glenelg	Anglican Girls	1923	1998	Campus Became St Peter's Woodlands Grammar School

== See also ==
- List of schools in Australia
- Special interest high schools in South Australia
