= List of largest South Australian schools =

The table below shows a list of South Australia's 20 largest schools by enrolment size in 2006, 2016 and 2018.
This student enrolment information is based on current and historic information from the MySchool website and its predecessors.

School	Enrolment 2006	Rank 2006	Enrolment 2016	Rank 2016	Enrolment 2018	Rank 2018
Aberfoyle Park High School	1,104	20			1,059	
Reynella East College	1,199	21	1,489	6	1,250	12
Brighton Secondary School	1,259	10	1,554	4	1,613	7
Charles Campbell College	1,278	7	1,118	20	1,119	
Christies Beach High School	1,161	15			834	
Eastern Fleurieu School (R-12)	1,164	18	1,405	7	1,486	10
Glenunga International High School	1,265	8	1,731	1	2200	3
Golden Grove High School	1,212	11	1,367	10	1,329	
Hallett Cove School					1,354	18
Hamilton Secondary College	1,867	2	1,143	18	785	
Henley High School			1,382	9	1,417	13
Mark Oliphant College (B-12)					1,403	14
Marryatville High School	1,265	8	1,291	13	1,315	
Mercedes College			1,170	17	1,185	
Nazareth Catholic College					1,784	2
Norwood Morialta High School	1,416	4	1,558	3	1,533	8
Open Access College					5,600	1
Paralowie School (R-12)	1,159	16	1,363	11	1,355	17
Pembroke School	1,454	3	1,552	5	1,529	9
Reynella East College					1,711	4
Roma Mitchell Secondary College			1,175	16	1,281	
Rostrevor College	1,110	19			757	
Sacred Heart College					1,657	5
Saint Ignatius' College	1,300	5	1,353	12	1,334	20
St Aloysius College			1,273	14	1,273	
St Columba College					1,391	16
St John's Grammar School	1,300	5			782	
St Michael's College			1,643	2	1,636	6
St Peter's College	1,150	17	1,383	8	1,396	15
Tenison Woods College					1,345	19
The Heights School	1,199	13	1,152	19	1,172	
Trinity College	3,395	1	–		4,234|1	
Tyndale Christian School					1,456	11
Unley High School	1,208	12	1,220	15	1,203	

== See also ==
- List of schools in South Australia
