= Sports Association for Adelaide Schools =

Information
- Former name: Independent Schools Sports Association of South Australia
- Chairman: Tim Browning - Headmaster of St Peters College
- Deputy Chairman: Daniel Lynch - Sacred Heart College
- Executive Officer: Leo Panzarino

The Sports Association for Adelaide Schools (formerly the Independent Schools Sports Association of South Australia or ISSA) is a group of schools in South Australia involved in sporting and cultural activities.

== Controversy ==
The football competition came to media attention in March 2011 when it was reported that schools were offering scholarships to lure the top footballers from rival schools since the introduction of premiership tables. The scholarships ensured the players were obliged to play for their schools, rather than within the SANFL, the peak football competition in South Australia.

This issue came to further media attention in August 2013 when it was reported that Cory Gregson, a player within the Sacred Heart first XVIII was not permitted to make his League debut with the Glenelg Football Club due to being a required player for his school team.

== Current member schools ==
The current members of SAAS are:

School	Location	Enrolment	Founded	Type	Denomination	Boys/Girls	Day/Boarding	School Colours
Adelaide High School	Adelaide	1200	1908	Public	N/A	Boys & Girls	Day	Black and silver
Blackfriars Priory School	Prospect	>1000	1953	Independent	Roman Catholic	Boys	Day	Black, sky blue and white
Cabra Dominican College	Cumberland Park	~1100	1886	Independent	Roman Catholic	Boys & Girls	Day	Cardinal, gold, black and white
Cardijn College	Noarlunga Downs	880	1984	Independent	Roman Catholic	Boys & Girls	Day	Maroon, sky blue and gold
Christian Brothers College	Adelaide	800	1878	Independent	Roman Catholic	Boys	Day	Purple and white
Concordia College	Highgate	700	1890	Independent	Lutheran	Boys & Girls	Day	Navy and gold
Gleeson College	Golden Grove	700	1989	Independent	Roman Catholic	Boys & Girls	Day	Maroon and white
Glenunga International High School	Glenunga	1230	1903	Public	N/A	Boys & Girls	Day	Navy and gold
Immanuel College	Novar Gardens	800	1895	Independent	Lutheran	Boys & Girls	Day & Boarding	Navy, gold and white
Marryatville High School	Marryatville	1400	1877	Public	N/A	Boys & Girls	Day	Navy, sky blue and white
Mercedes College	Springfield		1954	Independent	Roman Catholic	Boys & Girls	Day	Green and gold
Modbury High School	Modbury	720	1965	Public	N/A	Boys & Girls	Day	Sky blue, navy, white and green
Morialta Secondary College	Rostrevor	570	2023	Public	N/A	Boys & Girls	Day	Orange and charcoal grey
Nazareth Catholic College	Flinders Park	~940	2007	Independent	Roman Catholic	Boys & Girls	Day	Old gold, charcoal and cream
Norwood Morialta High School	Magill & Rostrevor	1400	1910	Public	N/A	Boys & Girls	Day	Dark blue, gold and red
Pedare Christian College	Golden Grove	1100	1986	Independent	Anglican and Uniting Church	Boys & Girls	Day	Blue, red and white
Pembroke School	Kensington Park	1545	1915	Independent	Non-denominational	Boys & Girls	Day & Boarding	Blue, green and gold
Prince Alfred College	Kent Town	1000	1869	Independent	Uniting Church	Boys	Day & Boarding	Red and white
Pulteney Grammar School	Adelaide	~820	1847	Independent	Anglican	Boys & Girls	Day	Blue, white and red
Rostrevor College	Woodforde	1140	1923	Independent	Roman Catholic	Boys	Day & Boarding	Red and black
Sacred Heart College, Adelaide	Somerton Park & Mitchell Park	2000	1897	Independent	Roman Catholic	Boys & Girls	Day & Boarding	Dark blue and sky blue
St Andrew's School (Primary only)	Walkerville	?	1850	Independent	Anglican	Boys & Girls	Day	Blue and white
St Ignatius' College	Athelstone	1386	1951	Independent	Roman Catholic	Boys & Girls	Day	Dark blue, red and gold
St John's Grammar School	Belair	1200	1958	Independent	Anglican	Boys & Girls	Day	Sky blue, maroon and gold
St Michael's College	Henley Beach	1200	1954	Independent	Roman Catholic	Boys & Girls	Day	Blue, maroon and gold
St Paul's College	Gilles Plains	600	1958	Independent	Roman Catholic	Boys	Day	Black and gold
St Peter's College	Hackney	1150	1847	Independent	Anglican	Boys	Day & Boarding	Royal blue and white
Scotch College	Torrens Park	850	1919	Independent	Uniting Church	Boys & Girls	Day & Boarding	Navy and gold
Trinity College	Gawler	3500	1984	Independent	Anglican	Boys & Girls	Day & Boarding	Navy, red and gold
Unley High School	Netherby	1300	1910	Public	N/A	Boys & Girls	Day	Sky blue and navy
Westminster School	Marion	1100	1961	Independent	Uniting Church	Boys & Girls	Day & Boarding	Green
Woodcroft College	Morphett Vale		1989	Independent	Anglican	Boys & Girls	Day	Navy, red and gold

== Sports ==
Sports which are currently part of the program:

- Australian rules football
- Athletics
- Badminton
- Basketball
- Cricket
- Cross country running
- Football
- Hockey
- Rugby Union
- Soccer
- Swimming
- Tee Ball
- Table tennis
- Tennis
- Touch Football
- Volleyball
- Water polo

== See also ==
- List of schools in South Australia
- Independent Girls' Schools Sports Association (South Australia)
