= Pembroke School, Adelaide =

Pembroke School

Location
- Kensington Park, South Australia; Australia; 34°55′19″S 138°39′18″E

Information
- Type: Independent, co-educational, day and boarding
- Motto: Latin: Ex Unitate Vires (Out of Unity, Strength)
- Denomination: Non-denominational
- Established: 1915 (Girton Girls' School); 1923 (King's College); 1974 (amalgamation)
- Chairperson: Jane Miller
- Principal: Mark Staker
- Employees: ~153
- Enrolment: ~1,545 (ELC–12)
- Colours: Royal blue, green & gold
- Affiliation: Sports Association for Adelaide Schools; Independent Girls Schools Sports Association
- Website: pembroke.sa.edu.au

Pembroke School is an Australian independent co-educational and non-denominational day and boarding school located in Kensington Park, a suburb 6 kilometres (3.7 mi) east of the centre of Adelaide, South Australia. It was founded in 1974 as an amalgamation of King's College, a boys' school, and the Girton Girls' School.

The school is on two campuses catering for approximately 1700 students from the Early Learning Centre (ELC) to Year 12, including up to 125 boarders in Years 7 to 12. Pembroke provides specialist education for a small number of hearing-impaired students, with the school's "Hearing Unit".

Pembroke School is affiliated with the Headmasters' and Headmistresses' Conference, the Association of Heads of Independent Schools of Australia (AHISA), the Association of Independent Schools of South Australia, the Australian Boarding Schools' Association (ABSA), the Junior School Heads Association of Australia (JSHAA), and is a member of the Independent Schools Sport Association (ISSA).

== History ==
Pembroke School was established in January 1974 through the amalgamation of two smaller neighbouring single-sex independent schools, King's College and Girton Girls' School.

=== Girton Girls' School ===
Girton Girls' School was an independent school for girls established in 1915. Pembroke's junior and senior schools are located on what is now called the Girton campus.

=== King's College ===
King's College was an independent school for boys founded in 1923 as a joint venture between the Congregational Church and the Baptist Union in South Australia. Pembroke's middle school is located on what is now called the King's campus.

=== Events ===
In October 2003, arsonists targeted the school's drama building. The structure was damaged and students' art and drama projects destroyed.

In 2006, Pembroke became the first school in South Australia to be granted an exemption from anti-discrimination laws in order to accept a greater number of girls than boys. The exemption was required because a gender imbalance which had arisen in lower year levels had to be redressed. The exemption was extended for a further three years in August 2009.

Pembroke continues to embark upon building projects, funded in part by donations and fundraising. In November 2007, plans to build a multimillion-dollar visual arts and centre and auditorium were announced. The building was completed in March 2009 and officially opened in May.

With the advent of the Building Education Revolution, the heritage-listed Angove House on the Girton campus was refurbished and restored. Work on the junior school established new classrooms and the new Early Learning Centre.

== School structure ==
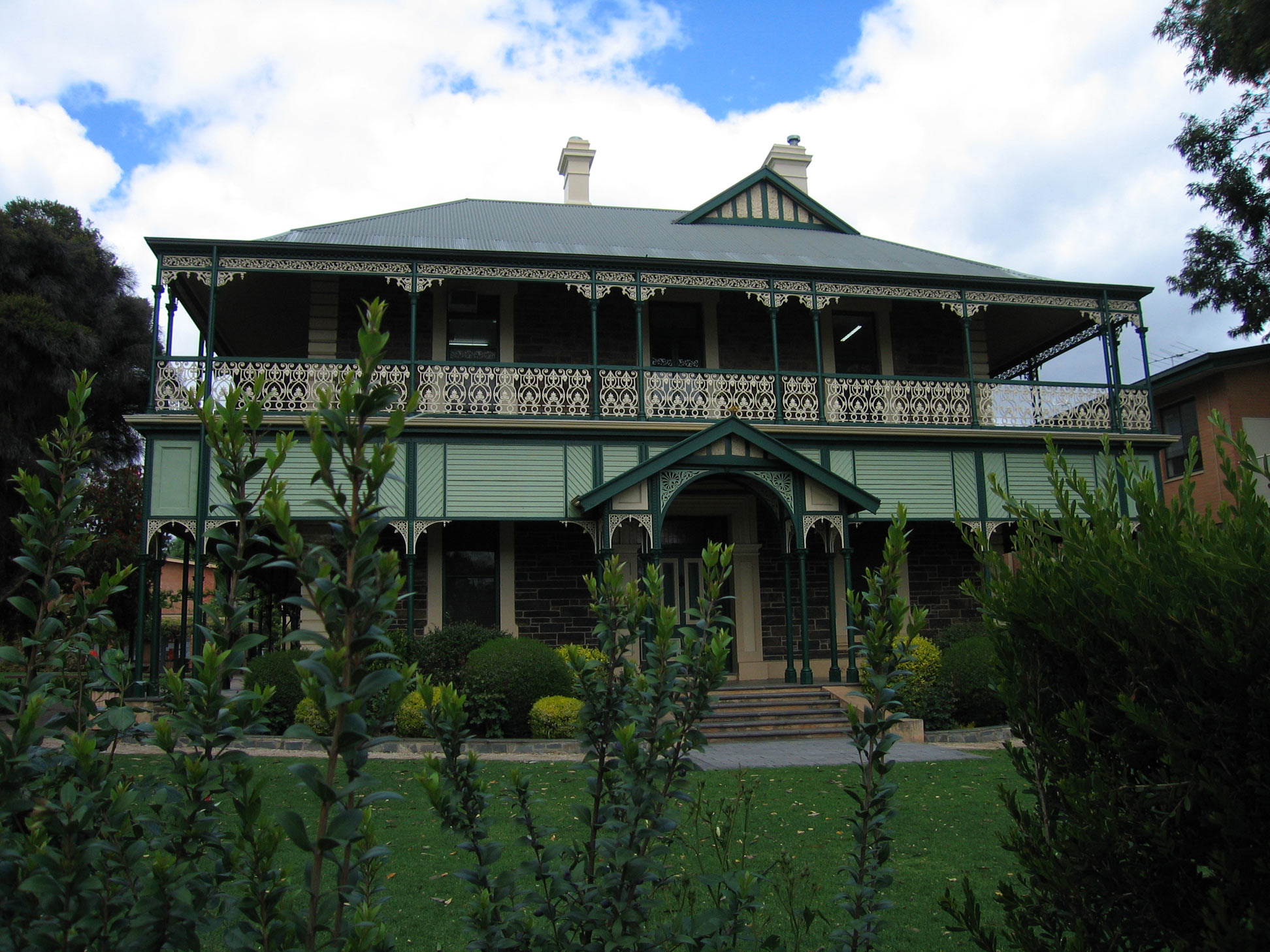
Bills House, King's Campus

Pembroke is divided into three "sub-schools":

1. Junior School (Early Learning Centre to Year 6)
2. Middle School (Years 7–10)
3. Senior School (Years 11–12)

In the junior school, students are allocated into one of four "houses", Torrens (Blue), Yorke (Yellow), Spencer (Green) and Flinders (Red), which are used for sporting events.

Upon entry into either the middle or senior schools, students are allocated one of the school's eight houses: Hill (red), Wright (dark green), Smith (light blue), Yates (yellow), Mellor (navy), Medlin (purple), Reeves (orange) and the school's newest house, Oats (lime green).

In the middle school, houses define tutorial groups and have a significant effect on students' subject teachers.

The houses play an important role in the organisation of pastoral care, intra-school sport and other activities.

Upon entry into the senior school students remain in the house allocated to them in middle school but do not remain in the same house allocated tutorial groups. Students are placed in a tutorial with one of their subject teachers. Students stay in this group for their two years in senior school, even if their tutor is no longer their subject teacher.

== Curriculum ==
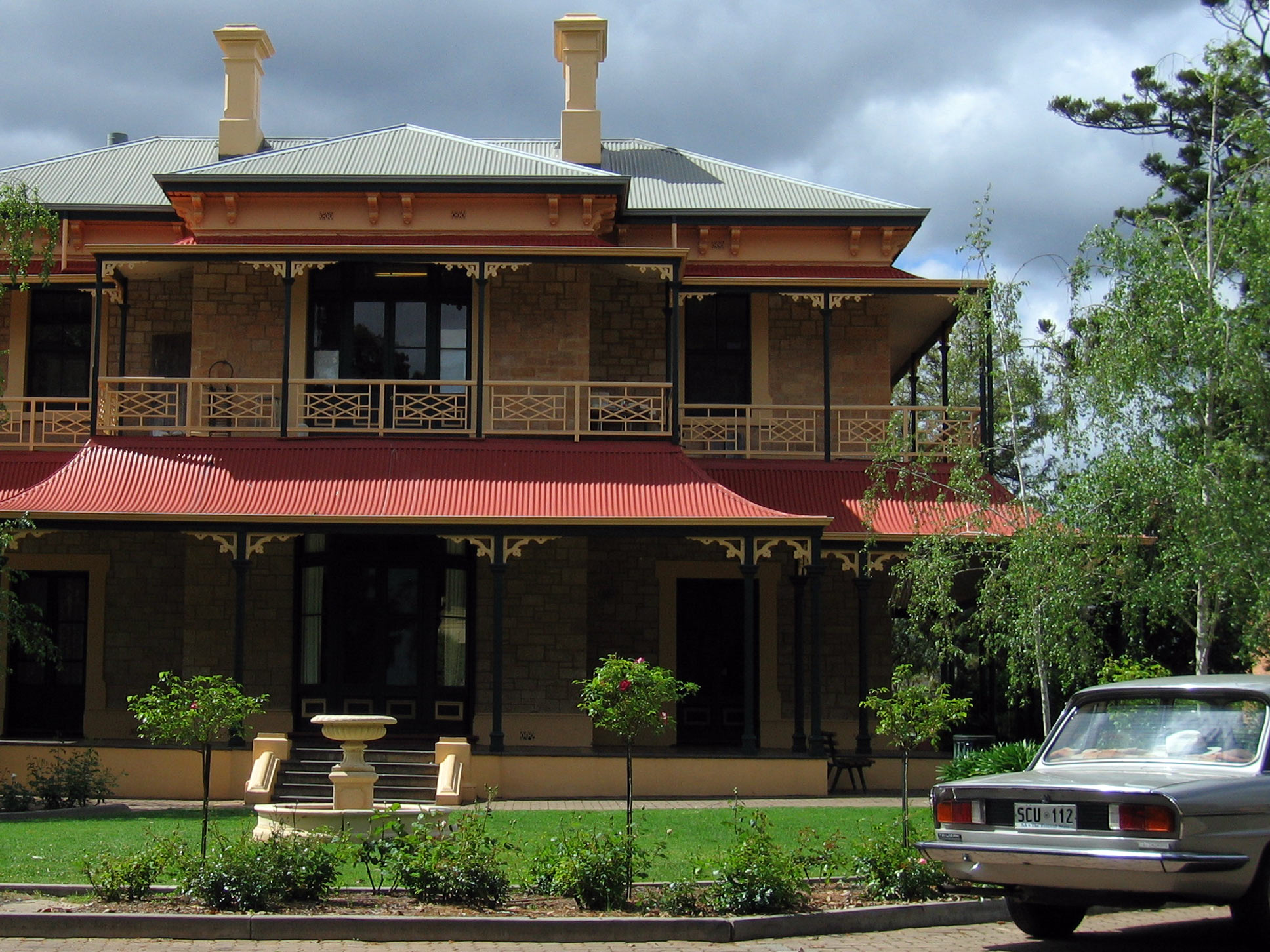
Angove House, Girton Campus

The Pembroke School curriculum follows a framework covering the eight nationally recognised key learning areas: English, mathematics, science, humanities, languages, arts, health and physical education and technology. Within each of Pembroke's sub-schools there exists a branch of the "Hearing Unit" which offers specialist assistance and support for hearing-impaired students.

From the ELC to Year 6, students follow the International Baccalaureate Primary Years Programme (IBPYP) and commence studies of a second language with Spanish. Foreign language studies continue with a broader range of options in the middle school up to Year 10.

In the Middle School, all students study English, Maths, Science and Physical Education as part of the core curriculum. Students in years 7-9 also study History, Geography and Health, whilst students in year 10 undertake the SACE Personal Learning Plan; Social, Emotional and Personal Development (SEPD) and Australian History. In year 7, students choose to study two Languages from Spanish, Chinese, French, German, or, as a recent addition to the curriculum, Kaurna, for a semester each, and continue to study one or both the languages in year 8. Year 7 students also study Visual Art, Music, Drama, Digital Technology and Design Technology, and can choose to continue these subjects in years 8-10. Geography, World History, Commerce, Film and Sports Exercise Science become additional elective subjects in Year 10. Pembroke School also offers English as an Additional Language as a subject, or an intensive English course under the Pembroke Connect Program.

In the senior school, a full range of South Australian Certificate of Education (SACE) and International Baccalaureate (IB) courses are offered, as are a select and broadening number of Vocational Education and Training (VET) modules. The VET component allows students to gain double credit for work completed at school and may be applied towards Technical and Further Education(TAFE) certificates.

== Co-curriculum ==
=== Outdoor education ===
Pembroke has an outdoor education program designed to promote respect for the outdoors and provide students with skills and knowledge of the environment.

In the junior school, students visit places such as Sovereign Hill in Ballarat, and Aldinga.

The base of the program in the middle school is "Old Watulunga", a 17 hectares (42 acres) property on the Finniss River, 75 kilometres (47 mi) south of Adelaide. Students participate in camps based at "Old Watulunga" and participate in activities such as canoeing, sailing, bushwalking, rock climbing and orienteering. In year 7, students spend two nights at Old Watulunga learning the foundations to Outdoor Education. They then build on these foundations in the year 8 program, where they spend three nights at the campsite and experience a one night "bushwalk" in preparation for the year 9 program in which students go to Innes National Park in the York Peninsula for a four night camp involving a two night expedition. The year 10 camp has students embarking on a five night water expedition from Old Watulanga down the Coorong with one day of training followed by two and a half days of sailing and then two and a half days of kayaking. Through all these experiences, students are exposed to a number of skills such as cooking on trangias, camping in tents and bush safety. Outdoor Education in the Senior School is offered as a SACE subject at either a semester or a full year at Stage 1 and a full year subject at Stage 2.

=== Sport ===
The sporting program at Pembroke is designed to encourage participation at all skill levels. Students may participate as members of teams in inter-house and inter-school competitions. Inter-school sporting competitions are facilitated through Pembroke's membership of the Sports Association for Adelaide Schools (SAAS), the Independent Girls' Schools Sports Association (IGSSA) and the Junior School Heads Association of Australia. Pembroke has competed in inter-school matches against Westminster School since 2005.

Sports on offer include athletics, badminton, basketball, cricket, cross country running, Australian rules football, hockey, Australian HPV Super Series, netball, orienteering, rowing, Rugby Union, soccer, softball, squash, swimming, table tennis, tennis, touch football, triathlon, volleyball and water polo.

==== IGSSA premierships ====
Pembroke School has won the following IGSSA premierships.

- Athletics (5) – 2003, 2005, 2007, 2008, 2011
- Badminton (8) – 2000, 2001, 2002, 2003, 2004, 2006, 2008, 2021
- Basketball (4) – 1996, 2000, 2001, 2002
- Football – 2020
- Hockey (9) – 1988, 1990, 1991, 1992, 1993, 2003, 2008, 2020, 2021
- Netball (6) – 1987, 1989, 1990, 1993, 1995, 1997
- Soccer (10) – 2002, 2004, 2006, 2012, 2014, 2015, 2016, 2017, 2018, 2019
- Swimming (5) – 2003, 2004, 2005, 2006, 2007
- Tennis – 2019
- Volleyball (2) – 2005, 2007

=== Other activities ===
Since 1986, when then teacher Campbell Whalley began the program, Pembroke students have participated in teddy bear making classes. Students construct bears by hand and donate the products to disadvantaged individuals. Over 3000 bears have been made over 20 years. By 2002 the program had spread as far as the Aboriginal community in Marree.

== Cookery book ==
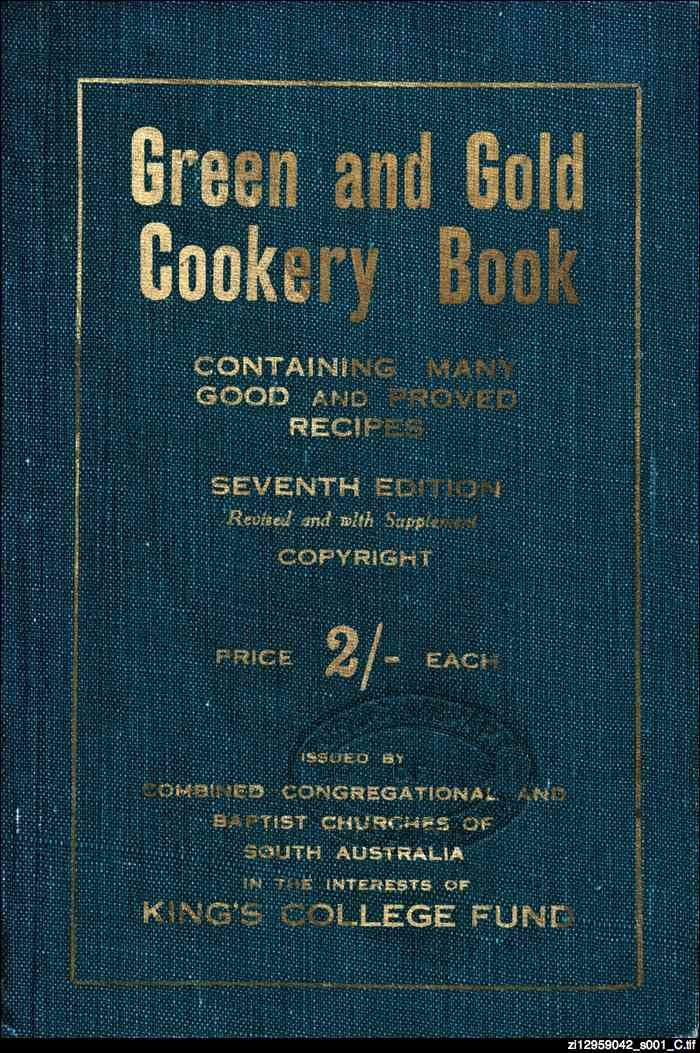
Green and Gold Cookery Book, 1933 edition

The Green and Gold Cookery Book is a heritage icon for both Pembroke School and Australia. The book was first compiled in 1923 as a form of fundraising for King's College. The school community contributed recipes and purchased advertising space in the book in order to cover the cost of publishing its first edition.

The book is now in its 36th edition and more than 400,000 copies have been sold in Australia, Canada, the United States of America and the United Kingdom. The book is regarded as a classic Australian recipe book.

== Notable alumni ==
Former students of Pembroke School, Girton Girls' School and King's College are known as "Old Scholars" and may elect to join the Pembroke Old Scholars' Association. Some notable Old Scholars include:

=== Business ===
- Richard H. Allert AO, prominent Australian businessman
- Jamie McPhee, CEO ME Bank, former Australian U-19 Cricket captain (1983/84)
- Basil Sellers AM, businessman, philanthropist and art collector

=== Entertainment, media, and the arts ===
- Adele Anthony, violinist
- Melissa Bergland, actress, Winners and Losers
- Sally Cooper, violinist
- Jonney (Junze) Liu, pianist
- Heather Croall, filmmaker, from 2015–2020 CEO and artistic director of the Adelaide Fringe
- Anna Goldsworthy, concert pianist
- Nuala Hafner, former weather presenter for Seven News, Sydney, now working freelance in London
- Kamahl, baritone
- Justin Kurzel, film director
- Glenn McMillan, actor
- Kelly Preston, actress
- Victoria Taylor, artist
- Clayton Watson, actor
- Stephen Whittington, composer, pianist, writer, academic
- Chris Winter, television presenter

=== Politics and the law ===
- Malcolm Blue QC, Justice of the Supreme Court of South Australia
- Vickie Chapman MP, Attorney-General of South Australia, Former Deputy Leader of the Opposition & Member for Bragg, Parliament of South Australia
- Natasha Stott Despoja, former senator and leader of the Australian Democrats
- Stephen Wade MLC, Shadow Minister for Correctional Services, Disability, Emergency Services & Road Safety; former Health Minister
- Stephen Patterson MP, Minister for Trade and Investment, Member for Morphett in the Parliament of South Australia, former AFL footballer with Collingwood Football Club, and former SANFL footballer with Norwood Football Club

=== Science and medicine ===
- Helen Marshall, vaccinologist and 2022 South Australian of the Year

=== Sport ===
- Olympians
  - Wendy Schaeffer OAM, Olympic gold medallist in equestrian events
  - Sophie Edington, swimmer, Olympian, world champion and world record holder
  - Tom Goodman, Paralympic para-triathlete and Pararoo
  - Amber Halliday, world champion lightweight rower and Olympian
  - Rafael Sterk, three-time Australian Olympic water polo goal-keeper
  - Matt Welsh, swimmer, Olympian
  - Isabella Vincent, Paralympic swimmer
- Commonwealth Games
  - Alison Inverarity, Commonwealth Gold Medallist 1992, high jump
  - Adam Steinhardt, 1990 & 1994 Commonwealth Games athlete
  - Matthew Carter, Commonwealth Games Bronze Medallist 2018, Diving
  - Sophie Edwards, Commonwealth Games Gold Medallist 2022, Track

Cycling

- Tennis
  - Roger Rasheed, former professional tennis player, tennis coach and tennis commentator
- Netball
  - Jane Altschwager, former state and Australian netballer
  - Jacqui Illman, former state netballer
- Cricket
  - Ken Bagshaw, former state cricketer
  - James Brayshaw, former state cricketer, now an Australian rules football commentator and Footy Show host
  - Ross Hiern, former state cricketer
  - Dudley Jamieson, former state cricketer
  - Tom Moody, former state and Australian cricketer
  - Sam Parkinson, former state cricketer
  - Rex Sellers OAM, former state and Australian cricketer
  - Andrew Sincock, former state cricketer
  - Caroline Ward, former state and Australian cricketer
  - Cameron Williamson, former state cricketer
- AFL
  - Jace Bode, former AFL footballer with Melbourne Football Club
  - Phil Carman, former VFL footballer with Collingwood Football Club, Melbourne Football Club, Essendon Football Club and North Melbourne Football Club
  - Nicholas Duigan, AFL footballer with Carlton Football Club
  - Tom Emmett, AFL footballer with Fremantle Football Club
  - Alex Forster, AFL footballer with Fremantle Football Club
  - Barnaby French, former AFL footballer with Port Adelaide Football Club and Carlton Football Club
  - George Horlin-Smith, AFL footballer with Geelong Football Club
  - Anthony Ingerson, former AFL footballer with Melbourne Football Club and Adelaide Football Club
  - Angus Monfries, AFL footballer with Essendon Football Club and Port Adelaide Football Club
  - Tom Read, AFL footballer for Geelong Football Club
  - Justin Staritski, former AFL footballer with North Melbourne Football Club and Collingwood Football Club
  - Jay Viney, former AFL footballer with Melbourne Football Club
  - Todd Viney, former AFL footballer with Melbourne Football Club

== Notable staff members ==
- Diana Medlin AM, former co-principal and principal from 1974 to 1990
- John Moody AM, former co-principal from 1974 to 1978
- Malcolm Lamb AM, principal from 1991 to 2010
- Luke Thomson, principal from 2010 to 2022
- Mark Staker, principal from 2022 onwards

== See also ==
- List of schools in South Australia
- List of boarding schools
- List of Largest South Australian Schools
