= Sheidow Park, South Australia =

Sheidow Park
- Suburb
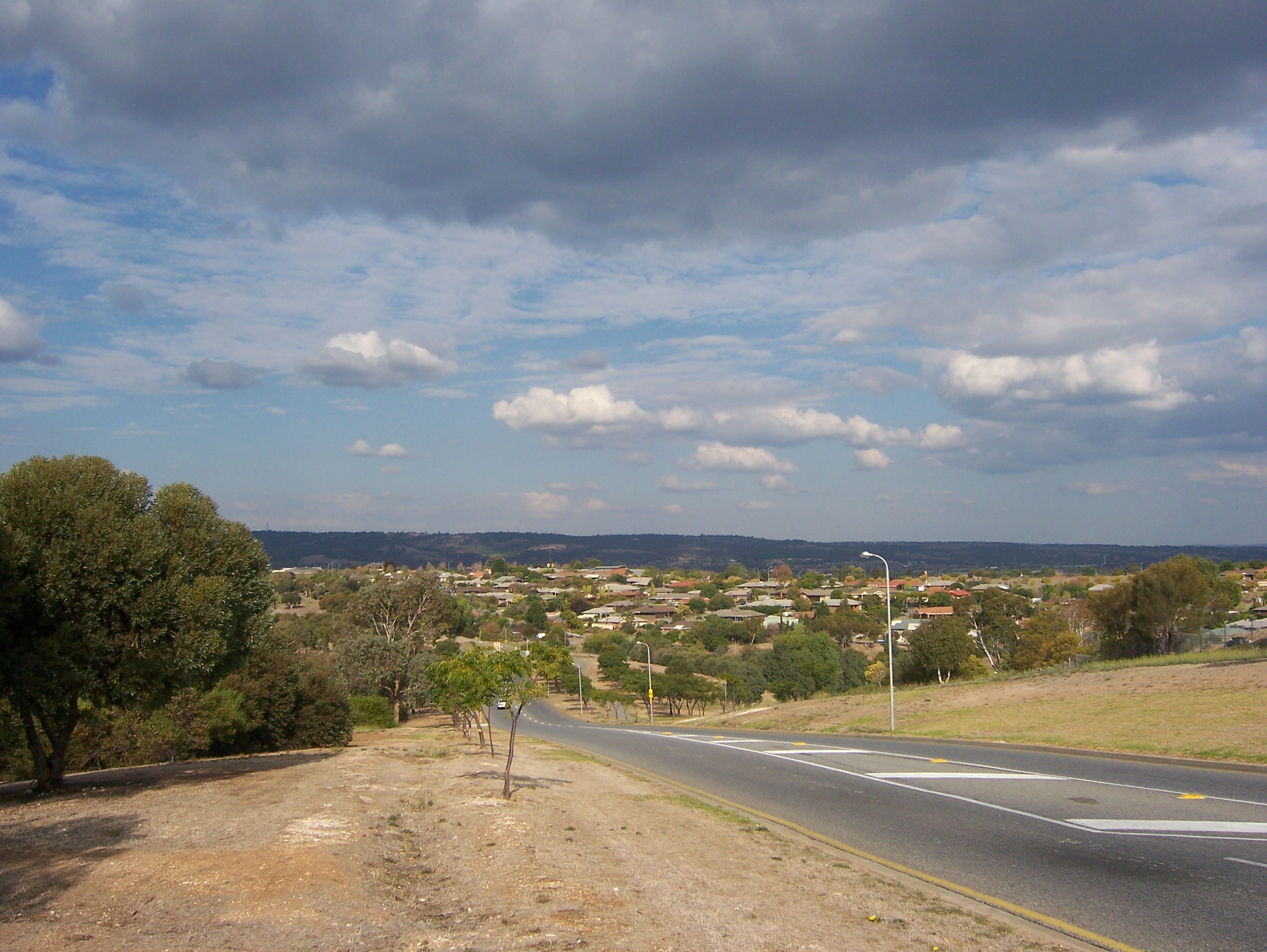
- View of Sheidow Park from Lander Road

- Coordinates: 35°04′01″S 138°31′36″E
- Country: Australia
- State: South Australia
- City: Adelaide
- LGA: City of Marion
- Location: 22 km (14 mi) from City-centre

Government
  - State electorate: Black
  - Federal division: Kingston

Population
  - Total: 6,731 (SAL 2021)
- Postcode: 5158
Suburbs around Sheidow Park
Hallett Cove	O'Halloran Hill	Trott Park
Hallett Cove	Sheidow Park	Trott Park
Field River	Reynella	Old Reynella

Sheidow Park is a suburb in the south of Adelaide, South Australia. The suburb is approximately 22 kilometres (14 mi) from the city-centre and is situated on coastal hills above the Adelaide Plains. The size of Sheidow Park is approximately 3.5 square kilometres. It has 9 parks covering nearly 6.1% of total area. The predominant age group in Sheidow Park is 0–9 years. Households in Sheidow Park are primarily couples with children. In general, people in Sheidow Park work in a professional occupation.

== History ==
Named after the once prominent Sheidow pastoralist family that previously owned nearly all the land in the area, Sheidow Park is a relatively new suburb; residential development began in earnest in the late 1970s. The Sheidow family, formerly resident at a mansion overlooking Holdfast Bay, now reside on a large estate beside Hallet Cove Beach. Reflecting the suburb's agricultural past is the former railway track that winds through the area – an agricultural route in times gone by. The suburb has been growing progressively larger, absorbing much of Trott Park. The first major residential development in Sheidow Park was West of Heysen Drive, Trott Park. Nearly two decades later the Higginbotham Woodend Estate commenced on the southern side of Lander Road. The estate, like other planned developments, was released in stages, finishing with the final release in the late 1990s. The estate was essentially square-shaped, bordered by four main boulevards. A curious point is the naming of the streets; it is often a difficult area for visitors to navigate on account of confusing street names, with an unusually high proportion named after either fruits or apparent 'somebodies'. Originally, there was a community centre with shops located centrally on Edward Beck Drive and Lemon Road (now Young Street), opposite the sales centre. However, the centre closed, and two years later the owner planned to convert it to a tavern. The proposal was met with fierce community opposition culminating in the State Government's decision to purchase and use the building as an extension of the current Woodend Primary School.

As of 2017, the suburb is still growing, expanding into the Field River Valley (locally known as 'the Valley') with the Southbank Estate development. The area's semi-rural character is becoming progressively more urban as the process of urbanisation increases.

With total house prices increasing by 31% over the five-year period, Sheidow Park benefited from a rising property market.

== Schools ==
There is a good mix of private and public schools within a 3.5 km radius including Woodend Primary School, Sheidow Park Primary School, Hallett Cove East Primary School, St Martin de Porres School (primary, Catholic), Hallett Cove School (combined), Prescott College Southern (combined), Reynella East College (combined), Southern Vales Christian College (Morphett Vale Campus, combined) and Woodcroft College (combined).

Three schools located within Sheidow Park: all primary schools; two public and one private.

Sheidow Park Primary School is public and caters for students from Reception to Year 7. The school has been serving the community within the suburb since 1980, and is located on Adams Road. It is the only State primary school in the southern area of Adelaide which offers a Steiner Education stream.

Woodend Primary School is the other public school in the suburb and has been teaching students from Reception to Year 7 since 1995. Built in the 1990s, this has recently changed to Reception to Year 6. It is the newest school in Sheidow Park and has state-of-the-art amenities. It has the largest student population of all of the local schools. Upon finishing Year 7, students from the two public schools generally attend secondary school at the nearby Hallett Cove R-12 High School or at Seaview High.

The only private school in Sheidow Park is St Martin de Porres, a Catholic school that teaches Reception to Year 5. Students from St. Martin's are generally channelled to other south-west Adelaide Catholic schools, including Sacred Heart College Middle School, Marymount College and Cabra Dominican College.

== Transport ==
Sheidow Park is located close to the major north–south thoroughfares of South Road and Londsdale Highway. Additionally, the area is serviced by Adelaide Metro bus routes. It is also close to a major entrance to the Southern Expressway.

Sheidow Park also has great access via the Hallet Cove train station to the city.

== Location attractions ==
It's less than 15 minutes driving to Christies or O’Sullivan Beaches but 5 minutes drive to Hallett Cove Beach and Conservation Park (and the boardwalk offering dramatic sea and coastal views). In 15 to 17 minutes you can be at the Port Noarlunga foreshore, or venture northwards to Brighton Beach and enjoy the cafe lifestyle. McLaren Vale's food and wine country is just 20 to 25 minutes away, and in 15 minutes you can drive south to the Onkaparinga River National Park to enjoy hiking, camping, rock climbing or a picnic.

Southbank Boulevard Reserve offers play and barbecue facilities within the suburb itself, and Marino Conservation Park is also nearby.

== Medical facilities ==
Finders Medical Centre is a 12 to 15 minute drive.

== See also ==
- List of Adelaide suburbs
