= Saint Ignatius' College, Adelaide =

Saint Ignatius' College

Location
- Adelaide, South Australia; Australia; 34°52′37″S 138°41′50″E

Information
- Type: Independent pre-school, primary and secondary day school
- Motto: Latin: Deo Gloria
- Religious affiliation: Catholicism
- Denomination: Jesuits
- Patron saint: Ignatius of Loyola
- Established: 13 February 1950; 76 years ago
- Founder: Thomas Perrott, SJ
- Chairman: Sean Keenihan
- Rector: Peter Hosking, SJ
- Principal: Lauren Brooks
- Head of school: Phil Donato (Senior Campus); Nic Boys (Junior Campus); Rosemary Allen (Early Years)
- Years offered: Pre–K–12
- Gender: Co-educational
- Enrolment: c. 1,569
- Campus: Norwood: Junior school; Athelstone: Senior school
- Houses: Regis; Xavier; Kostka; Campion
- Affiliations: Jesuit and Companion Schools in Australia; Sports Association for Adelaide Schools
- School hymn: Deo Gloria
- Website: www.ignatius.sa.edu.au

Saint Ignatius' College is an independent Catholic pre-school, primary and secondary day school for boys and girls, located in Adelaide, South Australia. The school is part of the international network of Jesuit schools which began in Messina, Sicily, in 1548. The patron saint of the College is the founder of the Society of Jesus (the Jesuits), Ignatius of Loyola. The College has two campuses: the Junior Campus in Norwood, containing the Junior School (Reception to Year 6 students) and Early Learning Centre (3 to 5 years old), and the Senior Campus located across some 16 hectares (40 acres) in Athelstone, home to the Senior School (Year 7 to 12 students).

== History ==
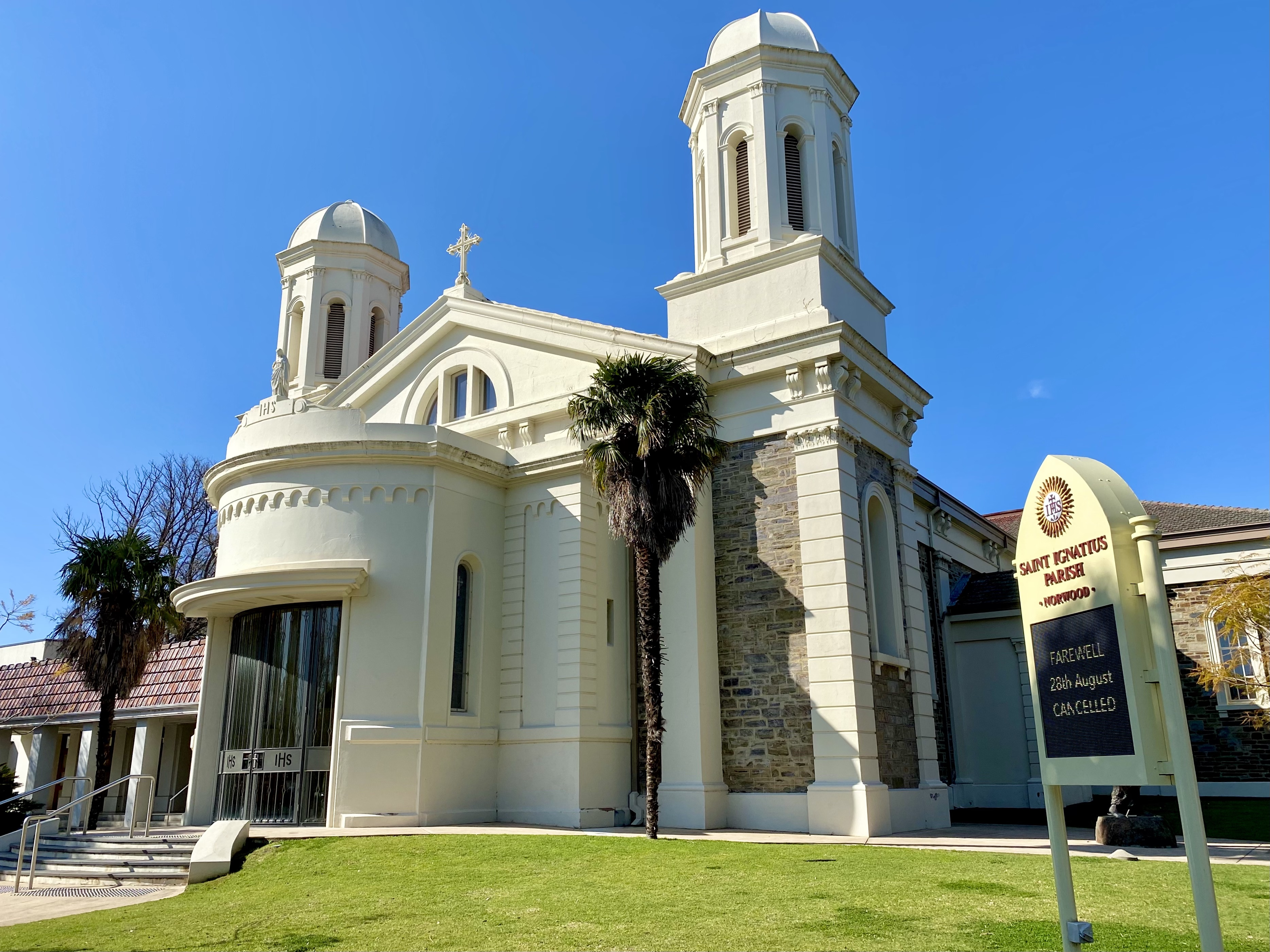
Saint Ignatius Church, Queen Street, Norwood

=== Single-gender education beginnings and later developments ===
The College began in Queen Street, Norwood, commencing with fifty-two boys and six Jesuit fathers on 13 February 1951. The catalyst was Archbishop Matthew Beovich's increasing interest in commencing more formalised Catholic schooling in Adelaide. Thus the Jesuit boys' day school was established. The initial intake was from Grade 3 onwards. Students prior to this year level were educated at Loreto College, St Joseph's Memorial School (the local parish school), or the local state schools.

The school grew quickly and in 1967 a secondary campus was opened at Athelstone, in the then outer suburbs of Adelaide and the Norwood campus became the Junior School. From 1971, the school accepted Kildare College enrolments from girls wanting to complete their secondary studies. At that stage, Kildare offered education up to Year 11. In 1996, the school changed to offer co-educational enrolments from Reception to Year 12, the first Jesuit school in the world to do so.

=== A co-educational Reception to Year 12 college ===
Today, over 1500 students are enrolled at the college's Junior and Senior Schools.

In 2005, the college and Mercedes College hosted their inaugural 'Intercollegiate Sports Carnival' ('Intercol'). Each year the senior students of both colleges participate in eight sports for twenty-one shields in the winter season. The school that wins the majority of the shields is the overall winner of the Carnival and of the 'Winners’ Shield’. Each school alternates the hosting of Intercol each year.

A significant celebration and event in the college community is the annual Patronal Feast Day of Saint Ignatius. A school mass is held at the Norwood Parish for current students and staff of the school; it is one of only two events in the college calendar where students from both campuses are gathered in one place. Saint Ignatius' feast day is celebrated on 31 July.

Aside from Junior and Senior School swimming and sports carnivals, another major event is the school's annual Distribution of Prizes, known as 'Speech Day', which all students from Years 3 to 12 attend. Students from Years 3 to 12 are acknowledged for their achievements in various areas of their schooling life. The 'College Blue' prize is also awarded to any past or present student of the college for extraordinary achievement in their life. It is held at the Adelaide Convention Centre at the beginning of Term 4 (October/November). The majority of awards are books such as dictionaries and encyclopaedias, as well as a small number of medals and trophies. Future student leaders of the school are announced at this event. As of 2020, the Influencers Church hosted ‘Speech Day’ due to COVID-19 restrictions.

=== Recent ===
Opening in 2011, the Mary MacKillop Library is a new double-storey library at the Junior School, developed to replace the previous, smaller library building. The Library contains more classrooms to accommodate the growing number of Junior School students, as well as more modern library facilities. Similarly, opening in early 2010, the new Senior School library building replaced the former Junior Campus administration building, and likewise, includes new classrooms for the increasing student population.

In 2014, the Senior School Performing Arts Centre, a Music and Drama Building, was completed, replacing previous demountable Performing Arts buildings. A new theatre was unveiled, named after St Peter Faber SJ, one of the founding fathers of the Society of Jesus. The new building houses student classrooms, tutorial and storage rooms, and an auditorium with raked audience seating for over 300 people.

In 2017, the Caroline Chisholm building was opened. The building is three stories tall with the ground floor being for a reception, student services and a variety of offices for different staff at the school. The second level is a staff room and the third level is an open learning space for students. This learning space includes a green screen for the school run YouTube channel ITV (Formerly known as the "Home Group"), a 'building' workshop as well as a number of interactive classrooms which teachers can book and arrange in the layout they want for their class.

In 2022, the Mary Glowrey Centre was opened. The building is three stories tall. On the ground floor it features a science hub, auditorium and gymnasium. The second floor is dedicated to music classrooms, and tuition rooms. The third floor has four classrooms which hold the year six classes. The tennis courts were also resurfaced during the construction.

In 2024, the Andrea Pozzo building was opened. The building is two stories tall with a ground floor featuring a technology lab with 3-D printing services. The second floor features an art centre and classrooms. It is colloquially known to the students as the "Faraday Cage" due to its wifi cancelling properties as a result of the white mesh surrounding the building.

== Headmasters ==
- T. Perrott SJ (1951–53)
- T. Barden SJ (1954–61)
- J. McArearvey SJ (1962–64)
- F. Wallace SJ (1965–72)
- P. Hosking SJ (1973–77)
- G. O'Kelly SJ (1978–81)
- N. Olsen SJ (1982–86)
- M. Ryan SJ (1987–94)
- G. O'Kelly SJ (1994-06)
- R. Davoren SJ (2007–13)
- P. Capaldi (2014–2017)
- P. Coffey (2018–22)
- B. Watkins (2022–23) (Interim Headmistress)
- L. Brooks (2024–)

The college had their first female headmaster in 2022, Barbara Watkins. She was succeeded by another female, Lauren Brooks.

== Sport and houses ==
Students of the College are separated into four houses under a College house system. House members are involved in various musical, pastoral, performing and sporting events alongside participants of their own house and opposing teams. The four houses are named after their patron Jesuit saints:

- Campion House – St Edmund Campion SJ. Motto: "The Expense is Reckoned." House colour: Green.
- Kostka House – St Stanislaus Kostka SJ. Motto: "Walk in Strength." House colour: Yellow.
- Regis House – St John Francis Regis SJ. Motto: "He Guides My Ways." House colour: Blue.
- Xavier House – St Francis Xavier SJ. Motto: "And Not to Count the Cost." House colour: Red.

As well as this, the school has an inter-collegiate relationship with Mercedes College, a fellow Catholic school in Adelaide's South. Every year a sporting competition takes place in the winter season with the school that gets the majority of 21 shields taking out the competition. Redemption was complete in 2019 when the boys First XVIII Football team won their respected shield for the first time in six years.

== Notable alumni ==
- Steven Baldas – Wimbledon junior doubles champion
- Daniel Beltrame – Adelaide United goalkeeper
- Damon Gameau – actor, Balibo, Underbelly: A Tale of Two Cities, 2040, and "That Sugar Film"
- Chris Kenny – journalist, author, political adviser
- Jeanette Kieboom – represented Australia at both the 1978 and 1986 Commonwealth Games
- Gregory O'Kelly SJ – Bishop of Port Pirie
- Christopher Pyne – former Member for Sturt and Liberal Party minister
- Olivia Savvas – Member for Newland
- Hugh Sheridan – actor
- Tom Warhurst – Australian rules footballer for Norwood and the Adelaide Crows 1991 (2 Games, 0 Goals)
- John Doyle – former Chief Justice of the Supreme Court of South Australia

== See also ==
- Catholic education in Australia
- List of schools in South Australia
- List of largest South Australian schools
- List of Jesuit schools
