= Goodwood Primary School =

Location
- Goodwood, South Australia; Australia
- Coordinates: 34.9516°S 138.5892°E

Information
- Type: Public school
- Motto: Fairness, Achievement, Respect
- Established: 1879
- Principal: Belinda Adams
- Enrolment: 416 (2023)
- Colours: Navy blue and gold (yellow)
- Website: goodwoodps.sa.edu.au

Goodwood Primary School is a public coeducational primary school, located in the Adelaide suburb of Goodwood in South Australia. It is administered by the Department of Education, with an enrolment of 416 students and a teaching staff of 27, as of 2023. The school caters to students from Reception to Year 6.

== History ==
A school in Goodwood was needed due to many of the children in the area were deemed too young to be able to walk to the nearby public school located in Unley.

The original school was located on Goodwood Road, which the land for was bought in January 1879, after the Minister of Education at the time, Mr. T. King, visited the property and found it suitable on 13 January.

The school opened in June 1879, with an initial student enrolment of fifteen, and by the end of 1879, the enrolment grew to thirty-two. The foundation principal was Mr. John Wilson.

By December 1879 a new school building was planned, with the land already purchased. In 1880, the new building with a maximum capacity to house 200 students was built, and by 1885, an additional two classrooms needed to be constructed, which led to the school being able to accommodate a maximum of 320 students. By 1921, the school's enrolment had increased from its initial 15 to 846 students.

1923 saw the establishment of an infant school, which had decreased the school's population to 662 students by 1924.

The school was designated as a Central School to serve students in secondary education in 1925 but was reverted back to a primary school by 1940, due to technical schools within the region being established in the 1930s.

To celebrate the school's 50th anniversary, a marble drinking fountain was erected on the school grounds in 1929.

By the 1970s, 70% of the school's students had non-English speaking backgrounds, mainly due to the post-war influx of migrants to the area in the 1950s. The enrolments peaked to around 500 at this time.

The school's centenary celebrations took place from 2 June to 8 June 1979, with past scholars, parents, and teachers invited to attend.

The school received $850,000 to construct a new school library in 2009, which was part of the 21st Century (P21) program. Additionally, in 2012, as part of the National Solar Schools Program, the school received an additional $49,952 in federal funding to go solar. The funding was used to install a 3.8 kW solar power system, as well as energy efficient lighting.

The handless backflip was banned at the school in 2018 after students began copying it from athletes, as it had become a popular celebratory move among athletes at the time.

== Extra-Curriculars ==
As of 2016, the extra-curricular activities the school offers to the students is the school's community garden and the choir.

== Notable alumni ==
- Mark Oliphant, physicist and former South Australia Governor, who attended the school between 1908 and 1909.
- Frank Walsh, 34th Premier of South Australia, who attended the school between 1907 and 1912.

== See also ==
- List of schools in South Australia
