= Marymount College, Adelaide =

Coordinates: 35.01185°S 138.52074°E

Sacred Heart College, Marymount Campus

Location
- Colton Avenue; Hove, South Australia; Australia

Information
- Type: Private, girls
- Motto: Omnia Per Mariam; All Things Through Mary
- Established: 1956
- Principal: Steve Byrne
- Grades: Year 6 to Year 9
- Colours: Navy blue and yellow
- Affiliations: Roman Catholic (Marist)
- Website: www.mc.catholic.edu.au

Sacred Heart College (SHC), Marymount Campus was a Catholic school in the Marist tradition in Hove, South Australia. Marymount Campus was a girls' middle school for Yrs 6–9. In 2019, Marymount was merged with SHC to create Champagnat Campus, co-educational for Yrs 7–9 at Mitchell Park. SHC also has a Senior School Campus, co-educational for Yrs 10–12 at Somerton Park.

Previous information:

Founded by the Sisters of the Good Samaritan, Marymount belongs to a group of three educational facilities, known as the Tri-School partnership. This group also consists of Sacred Heart College Senior and Sacred Heart College Middle School. Most of the students that pass through either of the middle schools continue on to the senior school, located nearby Marymount, in Somerton Park. The school has four houses: Adamson, McEwen, McLaughlin and Polding. Each year level had classrooms named after different themes. For example, year 6: colours, year 7: Australian tree species, year 8: precious gems, year 9: female Australian sports teams.

The school became defunct in 2018 and it merged with Sacred Heart College. The school is still honoured by Sacred Heart College with a building named after the school.

== See also ==
- List of schools in South Australia
