= Endeavour College =

Coordinates: 34.812°S 138.619°E

- Adelaide, South Australia; Australia

Information
- Type: Lutheran high school
- Motto: Love, Courage, Forgiveness, Hope
- Denomination: Lutheran
- Established: 1998
- Principal: Richard Baird
- Enrolment: ~600
- Colours: Blue, yellow
- Website: http://www.endeavour.sa.edu.au

Endeavour College is a Lutheran high school in Mawson Lakes, a northern suburb of Adelaide, South Australia. Subjects taught include Art & Design, Drama, Music, English, German, Japanese, Mathematics, Physical Education, History, Business Studies, Science (Biology, Chemistry, Physics, Psychology), Material Technology, Multimedia, Geography, Christian Living & Home Economics.

== History ==
The College started its life at Good Shepherd Lutheran Primary School in 1998, with 20 students. It moved to the Mawson Lakes Campus in 1999. Three stages of building have been completed at this site, adjacent to the UniSA Mawson Lakes Campus. Stage 4, the Gymnasium, was completed at the start of 2008, and is now in use. The 10th anniversary was celebrated in 2008. Endeavour College now has around 600 students, introducing its first intake of year seven students in 2017.

== Facilities ==
Endeavour College has a library, a number of science laboratories, hard technology center, art and design rooms and music rehearsal room. The Endeavour Centre was completed in 2008 and has a gymnasium, basketball court and supporting physical educational activities. Major expansion occurred in 2016 with the construction of the middle school to allow incorporation of year seven students.

== About Endeavour ==
=== Houses ===
Students at Endeavour are split into eight villages, each named after a prominent South Australian. Each house is again split into four care groups (North, South, East, and West).

- Heysen – Hans Heysen, painter of Australian landscapes, particularly the Flinders Ranges
- Florey – Baron Howard Florey, co-contributor to the use of penicillin
- Mawson – Sir Douglas Mawson, geologist and explorer of the Antarctic
- Spence – Catherine Helen Spence, suffragette, politician and first Australian female political candidate
- Mackillop – Saint Mary MacKillop, nun who emphasized education for the poor, and Australia's first saint
- Mitchell – Dame Roma Mitchell QC, former Governor of South Australia, Justice of the Supreme Court of South Australia, women's rights activist
- Kavel – August Kavel, founder of the Lutheran church in Australia
- Litchfield – Frederick Henry Litchfield, noted explorer of the Northern Territory

=== Feeder schools ===
Endeavour College has three feeder primary schools: Good Shepherd Lutheran at Para Vista, Golden Grove Lutheran at Golden Grove, and St Paul Lutheran at Blair Athol. It forms Connected Schools, along with the Salisbury Lutheran Kindergarten. It also shares strong links with the other Lutheran Colleges in South Australia: Faith, Immanuel, Cornerstone, Unity and Concordia. Endeavour also attracts students from the nearby public schools of Mawson Lakes, Para Hills and Pooraka.

== Notable alumni ==
- Matthew Cowdrey, Australian Paralympian
- Rohan Dennis, Australian racing cyclist
