= Sacred Heart College (Adelaide) =

Location
- Somerton Park, South Australia; Australia; 34°59′44″S 138°31′12″E

Information
- Type: Independent, co-educational secondary day and boarding
- Motto: Latin: Virtus Ubique Vincit (Courage Conquers All)
- Religious affiliation: Marist Brothers
- Denomination: Roman Catholic
- Established: 1897; 129 years ago
- Sister school: Sacred Heart College Middle School; Marymount College for Girls
- Principal: Daniel Lynch
- Grades: 10–12
- Gender: Co-educational
- Enrolment: ~1,000
- Colours: Dark blue and light blue
- Slogan: Courageous Hearts
- Athletics: Sports Association for Adelaide Schools
- Affiliations: Association of Marist Schools of Australia
- Website: www.shc.sa.edu.au

Sacred Heart College is an independent Catholic secondary school, located in the Adelaide beachside suburb of Somerton Park, South Australia and in the suburb of Mitchell Park, in South Australia, Australia. Focused on teaching in the Marist Brothers tradition, the school enrols students from Years 10 to 12.

Sacred Heart is known for its Australian rules football teams, cultivating thorough athletes since its establishment. It has an annual Intercollegiate match against its cross-town rival, Rostrevor College, which is a notable event in the South Australian Catholic Schools sports calendar.

The school also has an annual exchange with Assumption College in Kilmore, Victoria, which entails music and performing arts performances, debating, social and several sporting competitions.

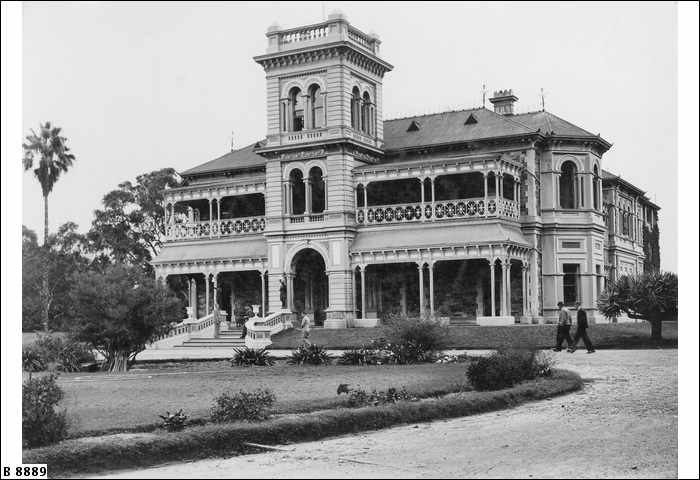
Paringa Hall, 1933

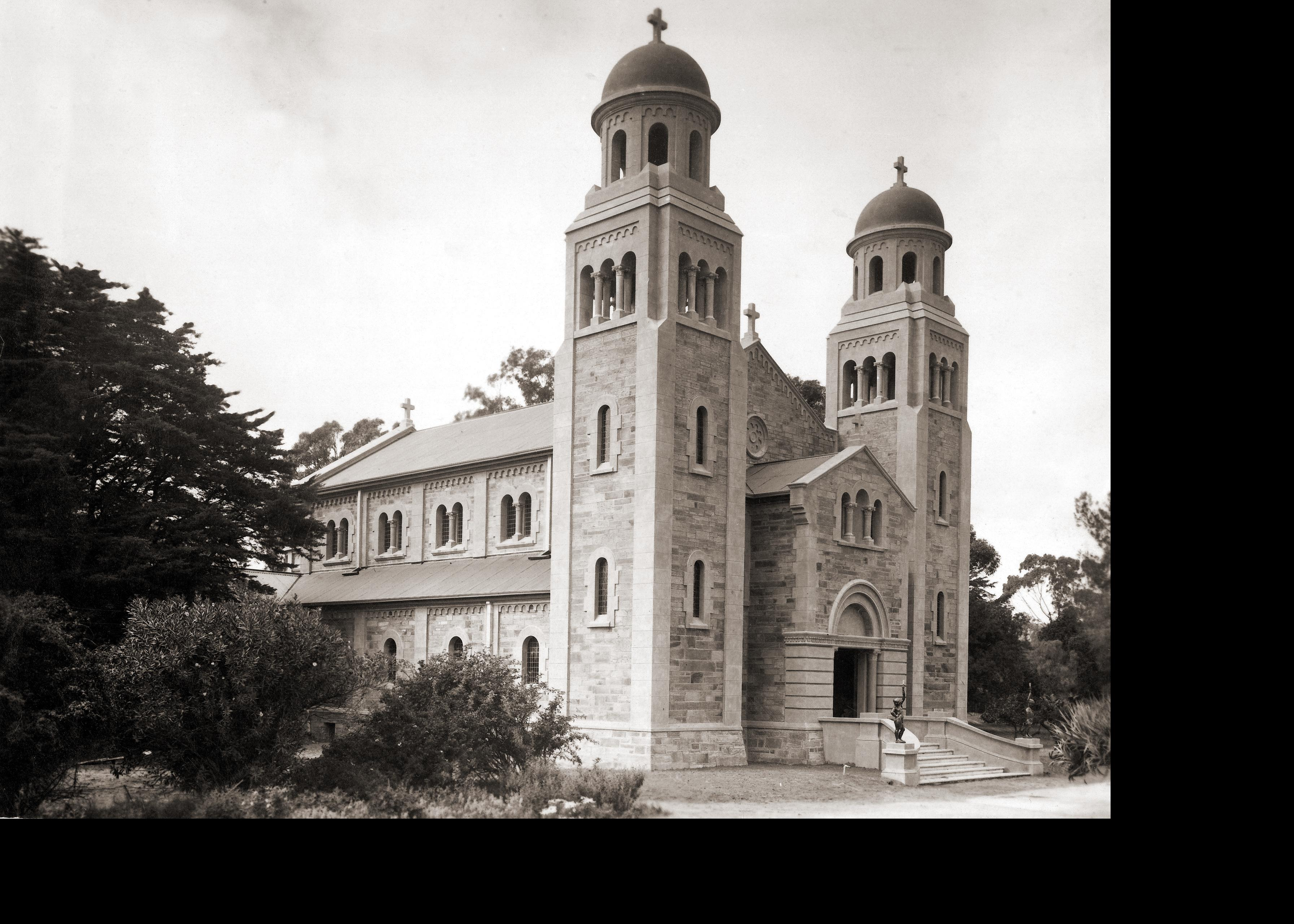
College chapel shortly after its completion, 1924

== Campus ==
The college is situated on three grounds in the suburb of Somerton Park on Brighton Road, 13 kilometres (8.1 mi) west of the Adelaide city centre.

Central to the college is Paringa Hall, named to recognise the Cudmore family's first largest sheep station in the Riverland. Designed by Edmund William Wright, a previous Mayor of Adelaide and a notable architect, engineer and businessman, who is also noted for designing the Adelaide Town Hall and Parliament House, Adelaide.

== Notable alumni ==
=== Clergy ===
- James Gleeson, Archbishop of Adelaide
- Francis Henschke

=== Politicians ===
- Mark Bishop, ALP senator for South Australia
- Rob Kerin, South Australian Premier

=== Miscellaneous ===
- Rob Chapman, CEO of St George Bank
- William Thomas Denny, army officer and public servant
- Albert James Hannan, Crown Solicitor, Catholic lay leader
- Annabel Hartlett, musician
- Stephen Kenny, lawyer best known for defending David Hicks
- Anthony Lehmann (Lehmo), comedian, radio personality, television personality and movie actor
- Shaun Micallef, television host and comedian
- Neville Quist, fashion designer for 'Saville Row'
- Robert Stigwood, entertainment entrepreneur
- Don Barker, television, film and theatre actor

=== Sportspeople ===
AFL footballers

- Charlie Ballard (1999–) Gold Coast Suns 2018–
- Ryan Burton (1997–) Hawthorn 2016–2018 (47 Games, 5 Goals); Port Adelaide 2019–
- Shannon Corcoran (1971–) Footscray Football Club 1990–1994 (23 Games, 2 Goals); Brisbane Bears 1995–1996 (5 Games, 0 Goals); Sydney Swans 1997 (2 Games, 0 Goals); Total (30 Games, 2 Goals)
- Chad Cornes (1979–) Port Adelaide 1999–2011 (239 Games, 175 Goals); GWS Giants 2012 (16 Games, 4 Goals); Total (255 Games, 179 Goals); AFL Premiership Player 2004
- Kane Cornes (1983–) Port Adelaide 2001–2015 (300 Games, 93 Goals); AFL Premiership Player 2004
- Will Day (2001–) Hawthorn 2020–
- Nic Fosdike (1980–) Sydney Swans 1999–2008 (164 Games, 66 Goals); AFL Premiership Player 2005
- James Gallagher (1979–) Adelaide Crows 2001–2004 (38 Games, 11 Goals)
- Cory Gregson (1996–) Geelong 2015–2018 (39 Games, 20 Goals)
- Adam Hartlett (1986–) Carlton 2007–2009 (11 Games, 2 Goals)
- Hamish Hartlett (1990–) Port Adelaide 2009–2021 (193 Games, 77 Goals)
- John Hinge (1986–) Adelaide Crows 2005–2007 (1 Games, 0 Goals)
- Mitch Hinge (1998–) Brisbane Lions 2019–2020 (3 Games, 1 Goal); Adelaide Crows 2021–
- Cameron Hitchcock (1990–) Port Adelaide 2010–2014 (35 Games, 31 Goals)
- Christian Howard (1991–) Port Adelaide 2011–2014 (20 Games, 3 Goals)
- Ben Kennedy (1994–) Collingwood 2013–2015 (25 Games, 15 Goals); Melbourne Demons 2016–2017 (15 Games, 13 Goals); Total (40 Games, 28 Goals)
- David King (1985–) Collingwood 2004 (9 Games, 8 Goals)
- Matthew Liptak (1970–) Adelaide Crows 1991–1999 (116 Games, 128 Goals)
- Andrew Mackie (1984–) Geelong 2004–2017 (280 Games, 100 Goals); AFL Premiership Player 2007, 2009, 2011
- Corey Maynard (1991–) Melbourne Demons 2017–2019 (2 Games, 1 Goal)
- Luke McCabe (1976–) Hawthorn 1995–2004 (138 Games, 12 Goals)
- Patrick McCarthy (1992-) Carlton (1 Game, 0 Goals)
- Tom McNamara (1990–) Melbourne Demons 2009–2011 (4 Games, 1 Goal)
- Danny Meyer (1986–) Richmond 2005–2008 (17 Games, 7 Goals); Port Adelaide 2009-2011 (9 Games, 1 Goal); Total (26 Games, 8 Goals)
- Alex Neal-Bullen (1996–) Melbourne Demons 2015–2024 (176 Games, 116 Goals); AFL Premiership Player 2021; Adelaide Crows 2025-
- John Noble (1997–) Collingwood 2019–
- Matthew Pavlich (1981–) Fremantle 2000–2016 (353 Games, 700 Goals) Captain 2007–2015
- Jason Porplyzia (1984–) Adelaide Crows 2006–2014 (130 Games, 181 Goals)
- Jack Redden
- James Rowe (1999–) Adelaide Crows 2021–2022 (36 Games, 27 Goals)
- Jared Rivers (1984–) Melbourne Demons 2003–2012 (150 Games, 18 Goal); Geelong 2013–2015 (44 Games, 0 Goals); Total (194 Games, 18 Goals)
- Robert Schaefer (1972-)
- Aaron Shattock (1980-)
- Nick Smith (1984-)
- Tony Symonds (1962-)
- Simon Tregenza (1971-)
- Jakob Ryan (2024-)

Basketball

- Corey Maynard
- Isaac White

Tennis

- Darren Cahill
- John Fitzgerald

Others

- Bart Cummings, horse trainer
- Emma de Broughe, cricketer and former hockey player
- Joe Gauci, soccer player
- Matthew Hayball, gridiron football player
- Sergio Melta, soccer player
- Jesse Moore, artistic gymnast
- Nick Percat, racecar driver
- Maddy Proud, netballer
- David Sincock, cricketer
- Noah Smith, soccer player

== See also ==
- List of schools in South Australia
- List of boarding schools in Australia
