= Enfield High School (South Australia) =

Former government high school in South Australia

Location
- 350 Grand Junction Road; Enfield, South Australia; Australia

Information
- Type: State-run high school
- Motto: Pactum serva (Honour the Contract)
- Established: 10 February 1953
- Status: Permanently Closed
- Closed: 17 December 2010
- Years offered: 8 to 12
- Campus type: Suburban
- Colours: Maroon and gold

Enfield High School was a government secondary school on Grand Junction Road in Enfield, in the northern suburbs of Adelaide, South Australia. The school operated until the end of 2010, when its school community became part of the newly established Roma Mitchell Secondary College in nearby Gepps Cross.

== History ==
=== Establishment and development ===
The University of Melbourne's Designing Australian Schools database dates Enfield High School's establishment to 1953 and records a new school building in a photograph published in the South Australian Minister of Education's 1958 report. State Records of South Australia's archival catalogue gives a different commencement date of 9 February 1954, with an initial enrolment of 85 students.

When Enfield High School opened in 1953 in its present site, but on the eastern boundary, it was the first high school in the northern suburbs. Until then the only options were Adelaide High and Nailsworth Technical School. Even though the school was at Enfield, it was called Enfield High School because it was in the Port Adelaide Enfield Council area.

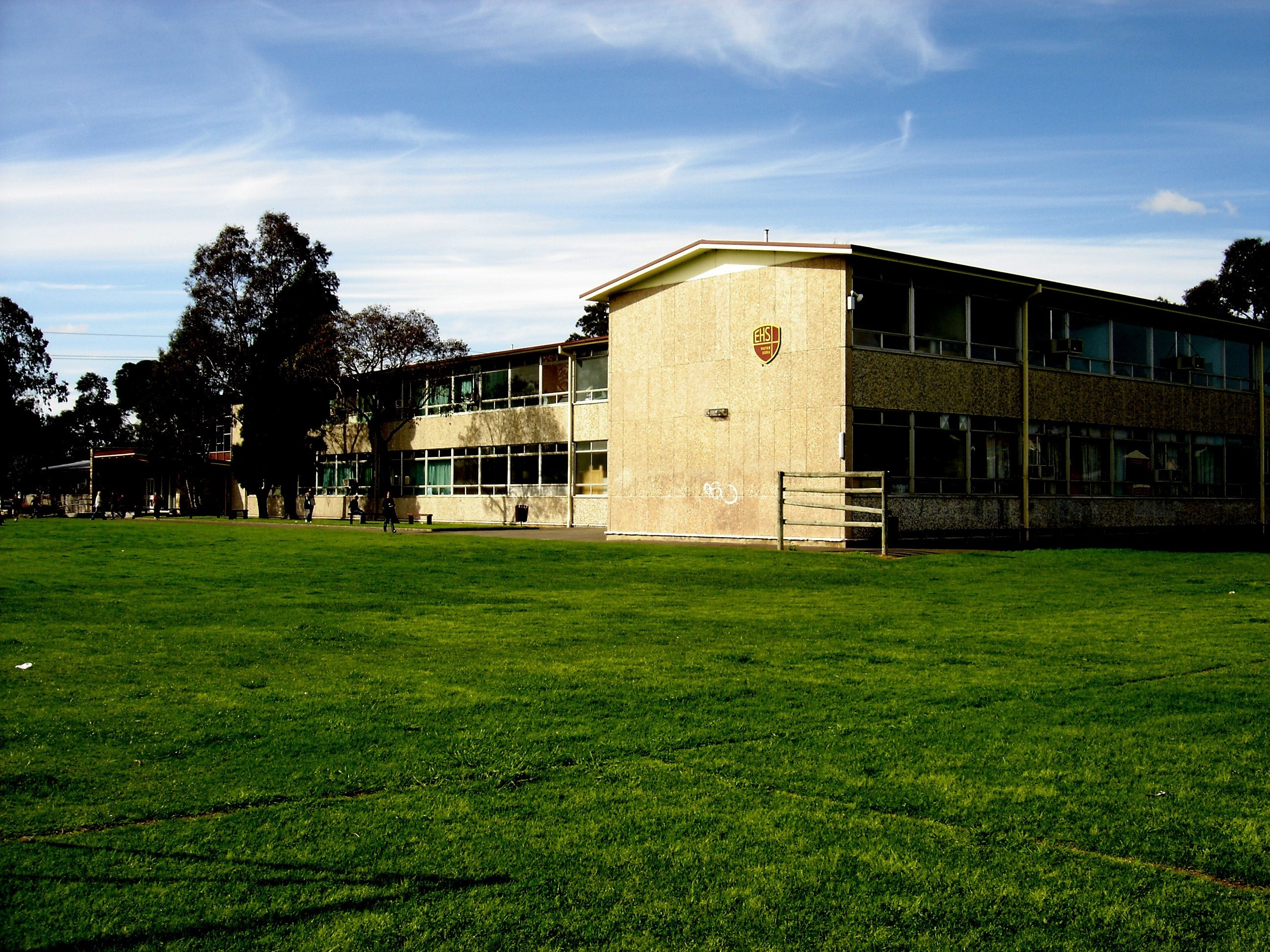
Enfield High School circa 2005.

Students travelled from as far away as Virginia and Salisbury. These students came by train to Kilburn and then on to the school by bus or on foot. It has been said that some intrepid students came all the way on horseback and tied their horses up to the water troughs on the western side, where the main building once stood.

Originally the school consisted of two brick buildings, toilets and shelter areas, and two 'temporary' portable wooden buildings. One of these contained the staff room, headmaster's office, sickroom, library, science laboratory and a canteen in the second unused science laboratory. The other building on the lower level contained four classrooms: each was painted in a different colour. The two wooden buildings, with new cladding, and one of the brick toilets which remained until the schools demolition.

On the first day, 10 February, there were 95 students – 49 boys and 46 girls – and a staff of six. There were only three classes: 1A had only boys and 1B had only girls. Unusually for those times 1C was a mixed class. Boys and girls came together for subjects like Latin or French. The headmaster, Mr Pyne, had one senior master, Mr Frick, one senior mistress, Mrs Peart, and four other teachers.

The school expected enough students to stay at school to make one Year 10 class in 1955: all the rest would have left for work. But in fact 48 students sat for the Intermediate Examination. Of these, 44 were original students.

The school developed educational, arts and sporting facilities over its later decades. By 2010, these included a music studio, drama studio, gymnasium, resource centre, information technology suite, canteen and sporting facilities. According to State Records, more than 45 per cent of students in 2010 came from non-English-speaking backgrounds. The school's community included students from Vietnamese, Aboriginal, Cambodian and Lebanese backgrounds.

Photographs taken by Hal Pritchard on 10 October 1962 document additions to Enfield High School, including classroom facilities and teaching spaces.

=== School restructuring in the 1990s ===
During the mid-1990s, Enfield High School was included in a South Australian Government review of secondary school provision alongside Nailsworth and Northfield high schools. The review formed part of a wider program of school restructuring and possible closures. In June 1995, Education Minister Rob Lucas told a parliamentary estimates committee that restructuring reviews could result in school closures, although closure was not necessarily the outcome of every review.

In 1995, Enfield High School was included in a South Australian Government review of school restructuring alongside Northfield High School and Nailsworth High School. The review formed part of wider changes to secondary education in Adelaide's northern suburbs. In 1996, Northfield and Nailsworth high schools amalgamated to form Ross Smith Secondary School, which operated from the former Northfield campus on Hampstead Road.

In 1996, Enfield High School was identified as one of several possible destinations for students affected by the closure of The Parks High School at the end of that year. Other schools identified included Woodville High School, Croydon High School and Gepps Cross Girls High School. The proposed transition arrangements included individual counselling to assist students transferring to other schools. In 2006, the school communities of Enfield High School, Gepps Cross Girls High School, Ross Smith Secondary School and Gepps Cross Senior School voted to close their schools and join a new multi-campus secondary college at Gepps Cross.

The amalgamation was part of the South Australian Government's Education Works initiative. The new Roma Mitchell Secondary College was planned for Briens Road, with co-educational, girls-only and special education provision. Enfield High School closed at the end of the 2010 school year, ahead of the new college's opening in 2011.

=== School leadership ===
In 2001, Giulietta Romeo was principal of Enfield High School and served on the inaugural executive committee of the organisation that later became the South Australian State School Leaders Association.

Peter Elemor also served as principal of Enfield High School and is identified in the National Education Directory of Australia.

=== Sporting achievements ===
Enfield High School had an extensive record of participation and success in interschool sporting competitions. The school won the Howard Mutton City Schools Shield in three consecutive years, from 1982 to 1984. Awarded by School Sport SA, the shield recognises metropolitan secondary schools for their combined participation and achievements in school sport, including local competitions, statewide championships and state representative teams.

The school also achieved success across several individual sports. Its recorded achievements included winning the 1979 Years 11 and 12 Boys' Open Schools Cup in Australian rules football and the 1982 Years 7 and 8 Boys' Division 1 soccer competition.

Enfield High School recorded wins in statewide interschool competitions in Australian rules football, athletics, cricket, netball, soccer and swimming between the 1970s and 1990s. The South Australian Department for Education's historical School Sport SA results record the following titles:

Year	Sport	Competition
1975	Swimming	E grade girls
1978	Athletics	C grade boys, division 1
1979	Athletics	B grade boys, division 2
1979	Australian rules football	Year 11 and 12 boys, All Schools Cup
1980	Netball	Year 11 and 12 girls, division 1
1982	Soccer	Year 7 and 8 boys, division 1
1983	Swimming	F grade girls
1985	Cricket	Year 11 and 12 boys, All State Schools (SACA/Coca-Cola Bottlers Shield)
1988	Cricket	Year 10 to 12 girls
1989	Cricket	Year 10 to 12 girls
1992	Athletics	E grade boys, division 1
1992	Netball	Year 7 to 9 boys
1994	Netball	Year 10 to 12 boys

The Australian rules football result was the Year 11 and 12 boys' All Schools Cup, won by Enfield High School in 1979. The school also recorded consecutive wins in the Year 10 to 12 girls' cricket competition in 1988 and 1989.

The football register separately lists a team named "Enfield" as winner of the 1971 Year 6 and 7 boys' large-schools competition. As this was a primary-school competition and the record does not identify Enfield High School, that result is not included among the school's achievements.

=== Fire at the former campus ===
On 24 March 2017, a major fire damaged several buildings at the vacant former school. About 60 firefighters attended after a blaze that began in a building at the front of the site spread to two others. Smoke affected traffic on Grand Junction Road, while boarded-up buildings and concerns about asbestos complicated firefighting operations. At the time of the fire, the former campus was being prepared for a residential development. Police fire investigators attended, and the cause had not been determined when the incident was reported.

=== Chicken Chef and Enfield High School ===
During the late 1970s and early 1980s, Chicken Chef in Blair Athol was reportedly a popular lunchtime destination for students attending nearby Enfield High School. Students frequently left the school grounds to purchase the restaurant's hot chips, reportedly drawing business away from the school canteen and threatening its financial viability.

The school responded by investing considerable time, resources and effort into developing a hot chip recipe capable of competing with Chicken Chef's popular offering. This included purchasing a commercial deep fryer, providing specialised staff training and dedicating significant attention to perfecting the preparation, texture and flavour of its chips. The initiative was reportedly successful, with the improved product helping the school canteen regain a substantial share of students' lunchtime spending and reducing the appeal of leaving school grounds for Chicken Chef's chips.

== Notable former students ==
- Dale Agius - South Australian Aboriginal community leader and former Commissioner for First Nations Voice to Parliament. He subsequently became Commissioner for Aboriginal Children and Young People. Agius is also president of the Kilburn Football and Cricket Club, where he has played more than 300 games, and chairs the South Australian Aboriginal Football and Netball Carnival.
- Robyn Archer - singer, cabaret performer, writer and arts administrator. She was head prefect and editor of the school magazine at Enfield High School, and later served as artistic director of the Adelaide Festival in 1998 and 2000.
- Craig Bradley - former Australian rules football player who played 375 VFL/AFL games for Carlton between 1986 and 2002, won premierships in 1987 and 1995, and was inducted into the Australian Football Hall of Fame in 2006. Before joining Carlton, he played for Port Adelaide in the SANFL.
- Joseph Del Re - Australian film, television and theatre actor. He appeared in the Australian thriller Coffin Rock (2009), played Lenny Gordon in Home and Away (2019), and appeared in the television miniseries The Claremont Murders (2023). His theatre roles include Haemon in Sport for Jove's Antigone (2016) and Ray Say in Darlinghurst Theatre Company's The Rise and Fall of Little Voice (2019).
- Stuart Dew - former Australian rules footballer and coach. He played 206 AFL games across Port Adelaide and Hawthorn, winning premierships in 2004 and 2008. He was senior coach of the Gold Coast Suns from 2018 to 2023 and became Port Adelaide's senior assistant coach in 2026.
- Dave Edwards (known professionally as Big Al) - Adelaide stand-up comedian and former radio presenter, who appeared at the Adelaide Fringe and Melbourne International Comedy Festival and hosted a program on Fresh 92.7. He received Adelaide Comedy's People's Choice Best Local award in 2015 and is listed among the Adelaide Comedy Hall of Fame honourees.
- John Quiggin - economist, author and professor at the University of Queensland, known for his work in economic policy, environmental economics and decision theory. He wrote Zombie Economics (2010) and received an Australian Laureate Fellowship in 2012.
- Tony Zappia - Australian politician and former mayor of the City of Salisbury. His published biography confirms that he attended Enfield High School. He served as mayor from 1997 to 2007 and has represented the federal electorate of Makin in the Australian House of Representatives since 2007.

== Notable former staff ==
- Mark Soderstrom - former physical education teacher, Australian rules footballer and television and radio presenter. He played 125 games in the South Australian National Football League for North Adelaide, Glenelg and Sturt before becoming a sports presenter for Seven News.
- Bruce Nyland - former Port Adelaide Football Club player who made 165 SANFL appearances between 1962 and 1972. He was a member of Port Adelaide's 1965 premiership team, finished runner-up in the club's 1970 best-and-fairest award and received SANFL player life membership in 1973.
