= Trinity College, Gawler =

Location
- Gawler; South Australia; Australia; 34°38′00″S 138°44′09″E

Information
- Type: Independent, co-educational, day
- Motto: In God Is My Faith
- Religious affiliation: Christian
- Denomination: Anglican Church of Australia
- Established: 1984
- Chair: Karen McMahon
- Head of College: Nick Hately
- Chaplain: Rev'd David MacGillivray
- Enrolment: (K–12)
- Campus: Suburban
- Colours: White, navy, red & yellow
- Affiliations: Sports Association for Adelaide Schools
- Guinness World Record: Largest game of heads or tails
- Reconciliation Action Plan: 2022/023 Approved
- Website: www.trinity.sa.edu.au

Trinity College, previously known as Trinity College Gawler, is an Anglican, K–12, co-educational, day school in the northern suburbs of Adelaide, South Australia.

Established in 1984, approximately 4,000 students are enrolled in 6 schools across 4 campuses in Evanston South, Angle Vale, Blakeview, and Roseworthy.

Students from the College have been successful in the Rock Eisteddfod Challenge (3rd in the small school section in 2004), the Tournament of Minds (2003 Secondary Division in Maths Engineering) and the Wakakirri competition, with Gawler River earning a 1st place in the division one section for new schools and South receiving 1st in the division three section. Trinity College is also home to the BaCoNeers, a FIRST Tech Challenge robotics team.

== History ==
Trinity College was formed in 1984, when a group of parents started classes with 27 students in the hall at St George's Anglican Church in Gawler, before moving to its now current location in Evanston South. In 1994, the college purchased 2.16 square kilometres of bushland and created the Blackham Environmental and Conservation Centre.

In 1995, the Trinity College Foundation was formed with a Board of 11 volunteer members and became incorporated in 1996.

In 2000, the college opened STARplex, a business adjacent to the senior campus, owned and operated by the college. As of 2025, the centre has four multi-purpose indoor courts, a 25m and 15m indoor heated swimming pool, gymnasium, café, theatre, and a conference room. Some facilities of the business are offered to the general public, as well as being used by the college.

In 2020, the "Trinity Innovation and Creativity School" was opened, containing an art gallery, podcast studios, green rooms, 360 degree projection room, multiple classrooms, design studios and a sunken gallery with a large screen. In 2021 it was announced the school would be teaching students to create VR content as a partner in a project with Pembroke and SEDA College, with the schools working with Newcastle University to run a year-long trial in VR content creation.

The College opened a sixth school at Roseworthy in 2024.

== Alumni ==
- Travis Head (2011) – cricketer
- Wes Carr (1999) – singer/songwriter
- Glenn Docherty (2001) – Mayor of City of Playford, Australia
- Brad Symes (2001) – footballer
- Ryan Harris (1997) – former cricketer
- Paul Benz (2003) – Paralympic athlete
- Chelsea Jaensch (2002) – track and field athlete
- Wayne Milera (2015) – footballer
- Jackson Hately (2018) – footballer
- Kristian Rees (1996) – footballer
- Clementine Ford (1998) – writer

== Criticism ==
In 2021, an incident of alleged racism occurred involving two Trinity College Senior schoolgirls, who were reported to have lynched a black baby doll. A white doll was also mistreated. Although an investigation by the school found the incident to not be racially motivated, the school acknowledged that "not having a racist intent does not mean the impact is not racist" and suspended seven students over the incident.

== Headmasters ==
- Mrs Christina Hatchett – 1984
- Mr Michael Hewitson – 1984 to 2002
- Mr Luke Thompson – 2002 to 2010
- Mr Nick Hately – 2010 to current

== Schools ==
Current:

- Evanston South (Gawler)
  - Trinity College Montessori Early Learning Centre 3–5 years of age
  - Trinity College North, Reception – Year 10
  - Trinity College South, Reception – Year 10
  - Trinity College Senior, Year 11–12
- Blakeview (City of Playford)
  - Trinity College Blakeview, Reception – Year 10
- Angle Vale (City of Playford)
  - Trinity College Gawler River, Reception – Year 10
  - Trinity College Montessori Early Learning Centre at Gawler River
- Roseworthy (Light Regional Council)
  - Trinity College Roseworthy, Reception - Year 5 (up to Year 10 planned by 2030)

== Extracurricular Offerings ==
Trinity College offers the following extracurricular activities to its students:

| Art Club; Athletics; Bands/Ensembles; Basketball; Cattle Club; Choirs; College Musical; Cricket | Dance; Engineering and Robotics; Equestrian; Football (AFL); Goat Club; Gymnastics; Hockey | Lion Dancing; Netball; Soccer; Softball; Swimming; Tennis; Tournament of Minds |

=== Basketball Team Achievements ===
==== Championship Men (Open) ====
- Australian Schools Championships

(gold) Champions: 2018
(silver) Runners Up: 2016, 2024
(bronze) Third Place: 2019

== See also ==
- Anglican Church of Australia
- List of schools in South Australia
- List of Largest South Australian Schools
