= Dudley Jamieson =

Australian cricketer

Personal information
- Born: 4 July 1912; Redruth, South Australia
- Died: 14 January 1979 (aged 66); Burnside, Australia
- Source: Cricinfo, 9 August 2020

Dudley Jamieson (4 July 1912 – 14 January 1979) was an Australian cricketer. He played in eight first-class matches for South Australia between 1931 and 1933.

== See also ==
- List of South Australian representative cricketers
