= Saint John's College, Whyalla =

Catholic school in Australia

Coordinates: 33°01′27″S 137°31′42″E

Samaritan College St John's Campus was founded as a Catholic school for boys by the Bishop of Port Pirie on July 8, 1962, and conducted by the Christian Brothers. It complemented an already existing Catholic system of education in Whyalla. In 1975 St. Francis Xavier Girls' School, conducted by the Good Samaritan Sisters, was transferred to this site and two schools were subsequently amalgamated. Until 2008 it was a co-educational, Catholic Secondary School with approximately 470 students in classes from Years 8 to 12.

As a result of the amalgamation of Our Lady Help of Christians School, St Teresa's Primary School and Saint John's College, Samaritan College was opened in 2008.
