= Morialta Secondary College =

Public high school in South Australia

Location
- Adelaide, South Australia; Australia; 34°54′6.1″S 138°40′37.5″E

Information
- Type: Co-educational public high school
- Established: 1845 (Opened as "Morialta Secondary college in 2023)
- Principal: Roley Coulter
- Grades: 7–10 (As of 2026)
- Website: morialtasecondarycollege.sa.edu.au

Morialta Secondary College is a co-educational high school located in the eastern suburbs of Adelaide, South Australia. Founded on the site of the new Norwood Morialta High School's middle campus, Morialta Secondary College opened in 2023 and accepted year 7 students in its inaugural year.

Construction of the school began in February 2022, where the old pre-existing buildings were demolished and replaced by new infrastructure, including "a 165-seat performing arts centre, gymnasium, 2 sports ovals and courts, a library, gallery, café and a VET Kitchen". Constructions were delayed and the expected opening of the school, at the start of term 1, 2023 could not be accomplished, forcing its students to attend the nearby Magill Campus of UniSA for the first three weeks. The high school is expected to cater 1200 students by 2028, when each year level will have an individual cohort.

== Reason For Construction ==
In 2022, year 7 cohorts in South Australia moved from primary school to high school, in, and so did the rest of the nation. High school capacity was significantly impacted due to the increase in student enrolment. The construction of Morialta Secondary College was intended to alleviate these pressures, alongside the expansion of both Roma Mitchell Secondary College and Adelaide Botanic High School.

Morialta secondary college was initially called "Norwood Morialta" which had then merged with the "Norwood International" campus, leaving a campus in Rostrevor, where Morialta Secondary College and all of its 892 students lives today.
