= Nazareth Catholic College, Adelaide =

Nazareth Catholic College
- Primary Campus: 176 Crittenden Road Findon, South Australia Australia; Secondary Campus (7–9): 1 Hartley Road br>Flinders Park, South Australia Australia

Information
- Type: Independent co-educational primary and secondary day school
- Motto: In Joyful Hope
- Denomination: Roman Catholic
- Established: 2007
- Principal: Brian Schumacher
- Colours: Gold; Charcoal; Cream
- Affiliation: Sports Association for Adelaide Schools; Catholic Education South Australia
- Website: www.nazareth.org.au

The Nazareth Catholic College is an independent Roman Catholic co-educational primary and secondary day school located across four campuses in suburban Adelaide: a primary school campus in Findon, a middle school campus (7–9) in Flinders Park, a Year 10 campus in Underdale, and a senior school campus (11–12) in Kidman Park, in South Australia, Australia

The college was established in January 2007 with the amalgamation of Siena College (Findon), Cardinia Catholic School (Flinders Park), Mater Christi School (Seaton), and Our Lady of the Manger School (Findon).

== History ==
Nazareth Catholic College was established in January 2007 with the amalgamation of three neighboring Catholic primary schools and Siena College.

At the time of its inception in 2007 the Secondary College consisted of a predominantly female population, as the Secondary College had previously been Siena College, a school for girls. In 2011 the first co-educational cohort of Year 12 students graduated from the college.

As an essentially new college, Nazareth Catholic College underwent significant building works on both campuses. In 2011 the Primary Campus completed a multipurpose space and gym funded by the Building the Education (BER) funding provided by the Australian Government. In the same year the Secondary Campus at Flinders Park completed a Music Centre with additional classrooms built above the new Music Centre as well as additional classrooms in place of the previous Music Centre.

In 2012, an additional Technology workshop was created from an existing classrooms as was a Textiles Room from a previous storage area at the Secondary Campus. In 2013, another learning space was created in the Secondary College Library, with additional transportable classrooms added. With funding received from the Australian Government the Secondary Campus added new ventilation, skylights and lighting in the existing gym.

In 2019, an additional building was added to the Secondary campus to accommodate an adult learning environment for the senior year levels, as well as to expand the school for the introduction of year 7 students to the Secondary campus.

In 2023, an additional secondary campus was built in Kidman Park to accommodate students from grades 10–12.

== Curriculum ==
The Nazareth curriculum follows a framework that covers the eight nationally recognized key learning areas: English, Mathematics, Science, Society and Environment, Languages, Arts, Health and Physical Education and Technology. As with other Australian Schools these subjects conform to the requirements of the Australian Curriculum and the South Australian Curriculum Standards and Accountability (SACSA) Framework.

From Reception to Year 6, students study core subjects of English, Mathematics, Science, Design and Technology, Visual Arts, Drama, Dance and Music, Studies of Society and the Environment, Health and Physical Education, as well as Religious Education, and commence studies of a second language with Italian. Japanese is offered as an additional second language for study from Year 7.

In Years 11 and 12 a full range of South Australian Certificate of Education (SACE) courses are offered, as is the Vocational Education and Training module Community Studies.

== See also ==
- List of schools in South Australia
