= Seaford Secondary College =

Secondary school in Seaford, Australia

Location
- Lynton Terrace; Seaford, South Australia; Australia; 35.187°S 138.482°E

Information
- Type: Public, secondary
- Established: 1994
- Principal: Harry Stassinopoulos
- Grades: 7–12
- Enrolment: 896 (2022)
- Colours: Maroon and white
- Website: https://www.seafordhs.sa.edu.au/

Seaford Secondary College (previously known as Seaford 6–12 School until 2014) is a coeducational public secondary school located in Seaford in the City of Onkaparinga in Adelaide, South Australia. As of 2021, the school consists of 112 staff members, with the role of Principal held by Harry Stassinopoulos.

== Library ==
Seaford Secondary College includes a joint-use library, which is co-operated by City of Onkaparinga Libraries and the Department for Education, and is available to both the school and the local community. The library has been nationally and internationally recognised as a leading example of joint-use libraries.

== Sporting houses ==
Seaford Secondary College includes the following four sporting houses with their respective colours:

House name	Colour
Boon Boona	Red
Nashwauk	Blue
Tigress	Yellow
Tingara	Green

== Co-curricular activities ==
=== Sports ===
==== Surfing ====
- Come 'N' Try Surf Day
- School Sport South Australia (SSSA) Surfing Competition

==== Other sports ====
- AFL
- Athletics
- Basketball
- Netball
- Rugby
- Soccer
- Touch Football
