= Cornerstone College =

Coordinates: 35°03′36″S 138°51′16″E

Location
- 68 Adelaide Rd, Mount Barker SA 5251; Mount Barker, South Australia; Australia

Information
- Type: Independent, co-educational, secondary, day school
- Motto: Christ our Firm Foundation
- Denomination: Lutheran
- Established: 1990
- Principal: Kelvin Grivell
- Employees: ~140
- Years: 7–12
- Enrolment: 760
- Website: http://www.cornerstone.sa.edu.au

Cornerstone College is an independent, Lutheran, co-educational, secondary, day school, located at Mount Barker in the Adelaide Hills south-east of Adelaide, South Australia.

The College is a non-selective school, currently catering for approximately 743 students from Years 7 to 12. Since 2014, the College has also catered for Year 7 students. Facilities include a library, a basketball court, gymnasium, a canteen, an oval and a theatre. The school has a tradition of naming new facilities in a foreign language, the canteen is called Cibo Bello (Italian for 'beautiful food'), the gym is called Inbarendi (aboriginal for 'meet one another'), the library is called Anakalypsi (Greek for 'discovery') and the arts building is called Atelier. The houses are Battunga (green) meaning rolling hills, Naturi (yellow) meaning sandy soil, Moorak (red) meaning mountains and Aroona (blue) meaning running water. The house names are derived from local peramangk words.

Cornerstone is affiliated with the Association of Independent Schools of South Australia (AISSA), the Association of Heads of Independent Schools of Australia (AHISA), and Lutheran Education Australia (LEA).

== History ==
Cornerstone was established in 1990 as the first Christian secondary school in the Adelaide Hills area, having been first proposed in 1984. In 2012, the college upgraded its logo. In 2014, the college introduced year 7's to the grounds under a plan made in 2010 by former principal John Proeve.

== See also ==
- List of schools in South Australia
