= St Martin de Porres, Adelaide =

St Martin de Porres School

Location
- 1 Berrima Road, Sheidow Park, SA 5158; Sheidow Park, South Australia; Australia
- Coordinates: 35°04′25″S 138°31′37″E

Information
- Type: Catholic school
- Motto: By Labour and Unity
- Principal: Craig Fosdike
- Grades: Reception to Year 6
- Enrollment: Co-educational
- Colour: Blue
- Affiliations: Parish
- Website: http://www.smdps.catholic.edu.au/

St Martin de Porres is a Catholic School parish school in Sheidow Park, Adelaide, South Australia catering for children from Reception to Year 6. It is a feeder school to Sacred Heart College School, and Cabra Dominican College.
