= Ross Smith Secondary School =

Coordinates: 34°52′S 138°37′E

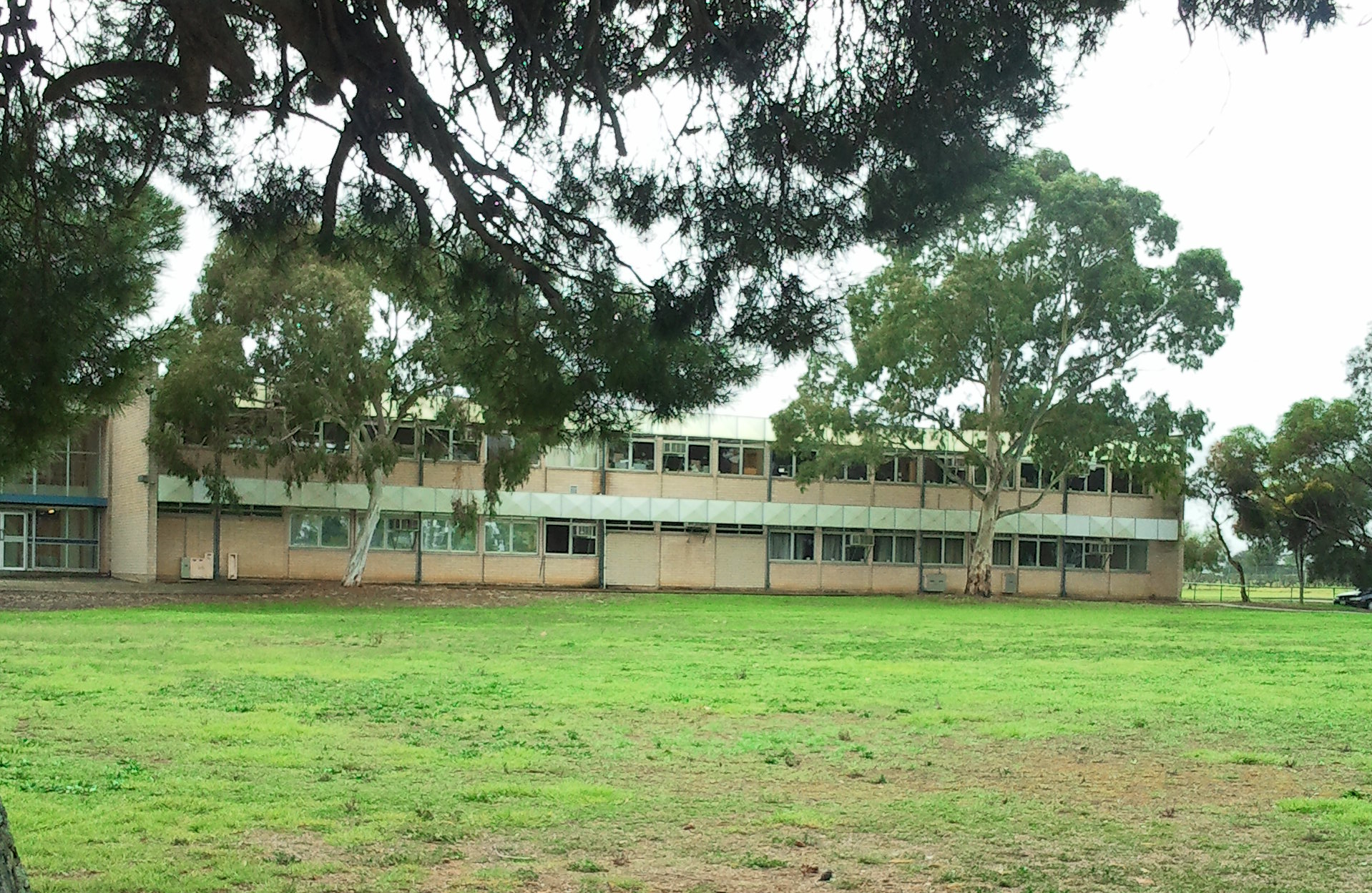
- School building in 2011

Location
- 181–201 Hampstead Rd; Northfield, South Australia, 5085; Australia

Information
- Type: State-run high school
- Motto: Building a Culture of Success
- Established: 1969 as Northfield High; 1996 as Ross Smith Secondary
- Status: Permanently Closed
- Closed: 2011
- Last Principal: Judith O'Brien
- Years offered: 8 to 12
- Enrolment: 397 (2008)

Ross Smith Secondary School was a high school in Northfield, South Australia. The original Northfield High School was opened in 1969.The School changed its name to the Ross Smith Secondary School in 1996 as a result of the amalgamation of Nailsworth and Northfield High Schools. The school had classes from Year 8 through to 12. The school's last principal was Judith O'Brien. The motto of the school was "Building a culture of success." The school was named after the aviator, Ross Macpherson Smith in part due to a large pine tree situated on the former oval of the school, thought to have been planted on the site where the Vickers Vimy came to a stop marking the end of the first flight from England to Australia. The tree has been retained and is now part of a small park.

The key values of Ross Smith Secondary School were Care, Acceptance, Equality, Openness, Independence, Accountability and Resilience.

Ross Smith Secondary School closed in 2011 and is now part of Roma Mitchell Secondary College with the majority of the former buildings being demolished in 2014 and replaced with new Lightsview developments.

In February 2015 the owner of the former school CIC Northgate revealed plans to turn the remaining structures into a childcare centre.

== Notable former students ==
- David Campbell – Singer, stage performer and television presenter
