= Tyndale Christian School, Adelaide =

Tyndale Christian School

Location
- Salisbury East, South Australia; Australia; 34°46′24″S 138°40′06″E

Information
- Type: Independent school
- Motto: Intentionally Christian, Inclusive, Excellent
- Established: 1983
- Principal: Phil Jones
- Teaching staff: 97
- Enrollment: ~1300
- Campus: Three (junior, middle and senior)
- Colours: Green, navy blue House colours: Faraday (blue), Newton (red), Kelvin (yellow), Kepler (green)
- Website: tyndale.sa.edu.au

Tyndale Christian School - Salisbury East, founded in 1983 by like minded parents who employed Roy Magor to be the first Headmaster, is a coeducational private R–12 school located in Salisbury East, South Australia, Australia. The school is named after William Tyndale, who translated the Bible into the Early Modern English language. Phil Jones is the third and current principal of the school, replacing Michael Potter as he becomes the CEO of Tyndale Christian School.

== Sub-schools ==
As of 2010 the school has over 1300 students enrolled to one of three sub-schools:

- Junior School (F–6)
- Middle School (7–9)
- Senior School (10–12)

Considered a cheaper more affordable school for Christian families to send their children to.

Prior to 2001 the school had Primary (R–7) and High (8–12) sub-schools, and prior to 2025 the Junior School was R-6 and Middle School was 6-9.

In recent years few more additions have been made to the campus including a new area called 'The Zone' for special needs children to work with more supervision effectively.
