= Christies Beach High School =

Coordinates: 35°08′S 138°30′E

- Adelaide, South Australia; Australia

Information
- Type: School
- Motto: Respect, Inclusion, Innovation, Achievement
- Principal: Graham Clark
- Enrolment: 789
- Campus: Christies Beach High School Cnr Beach & Morton Rd, Christie Downs Christie Downs
- Colours: Blue, white
- Website: http://www.cbhs.sa.edu.au/

Christies Beach High School is a comprehensive year 7 to 12 secondary school. It is located in the southern suburbs of Adelaide, South Australia.
