= Roma Mitchell Secondary College =

- Briens Road, Gepps Cross, South Australia; Australia

Information
- Type: Public–private partnership, public education
- Motto: Respect, Diversity and Excellence
- Established: 2011
- Status: Open
- Principal: Toni Carellas
- Faculty: 170
- Years offered: 7–12
- Enrolment: 1339
- Campus: Four (Special Education Campus, Middle Years Campus, Senior Campus [Studio 12 for Year 12s] and Girls Education Campus)
- Houses: Yellow, red, green
- Colour: Navy Grey White
- Website: rmsc.sa.edu.au

Roma Mitchell Secondary College (RMSC) is a public state secondary school in Adelaide, South Australia. It was established in 2011 by combining four previous schools, Ross Smith Secondary School, Enfield High School, Gepps Cross Girls High and Gepps Cross Senior School. The school was named after Dame Roma Mitchell, the first Australian woman to become a judge, a Queen's Counsel, a chancellor of an Australian university and a governor of an Australian state. The name was selected in conjunction with student and parent communities of the closing schools and the wider community. The enrolment in term 3, 2021 was approximately 1339 students.

In 2022, it was announced that the school will be expanded. Two new buildings were constructed to facilitate year 7s, who had been moved up to high school, falling in line with the other states and territories. The co-ed campus was split into middle years (years 7–9) and senior years (years 10–12), with the girls' campus moving to the new buildings.
