= Sacred Heart College Middle School =

Sacred Heart College Champagnat Campus

Location
- Mitchell Park, South Australia; Australia; 34°59′51″S 138°33′54″E

Information
- Type: Independent, co-educational secondary day and boarding school
- Motto: Latin: Virtus Ubique Vincit (Courage Conquers All)
- Religious affiliations: Association of Marist Schools of Australia; South Australian Commission for Catholic Schools
- Denomination: Roman Catholic
- Established: 1967; 59 years ago
- Principal: Daniel Lynch
- Gender: Co-educational
- Enrolment: ~1,000
- Colours: Dark blue and light blue
- Slogan: Courageous Hearts
- Website: www.shc.sa.edu.au

Sacred Heart College Champagnat Campus is a co-educational school for Years 7–9 in Mitchell Park, Adelaide, South Australia.

In 2018, Marymount College amalgamated with Sacred Heart College and in 2019 after 62 years of girls education, Marymount Campus staff and students relocated to Champagnat Campus at Mitchell Park, operating as a co-educational school for girls & boys in Years 7–9. Champagnat Campus belongs to a group of 2 educational facilities. This group consists of Sacred Heart College Marcellin Campus (Senior School) and Sacred Heart College Champagnat Campus (Middle School).

== House system ==
As with most Australian schools, Sacred Heart College utilises a house system, through which students participate in intra-school competitions and activities. For intra-school competitions each house is accompanied by a "sporting name". The college currently has five houses:

House name	Colour
Marian	white
Montagne	green
Chavoin	purple
Fourviere	yellow
Chanel	red

== See also ==
- List of schools in South Australia
- Catholic education in Australia
