= Generations In Jazz =

Music festival in Australia

Generations in Jazz
- Genre: Jazz
- Dates: May
- Locations: Mount Gambier, South Australia
- Coordinates: 37°49′46″S 140°46′58″E
- Years active: 1987–present
- Website: generationsinjazz.com.au

Generations In Jazz (often abbreviated to GIJ) is an annual weekend jazz festival held in Mount Gambier, South Australia. It is held in May and brings together many young jazz musicians from all over Australia and New Zealand.

== History ==
The Generations in Jazz Festival was first held in 1987. The festival's genesis dates from 1982 when three young musicians performed a tribute for their fathers and grandfathers. Nowadays, an estimated 5,200 young people in bands from all around Australia and New Zealand make their way to Mount Gambier. Professional musicians who have taught, performed or judged at the festival include James Morrison, Daryl Somers, Ross Irwin, James Muller, Wycliffe Gordon, Graeme Lyall, Gordon Goodwin and his Big Phat Band, Take 6, and Jeff Clayton.

== The World's Largest Modular Tent ==
Generations in Jazz is home to The World's Largest Modular Tent. The tent is approximately 64 metres wide and 84 metres long, reaching heights of up to 25 metres; it requires a crew of up to 18 people to assemble it and can hold up to 11,000 people.

While the World's Largest Modular Tent supplies seating for the concerts and division 1 performances, there are a variety of other, smaller tents that hold performances and cater for food.

== Awards and scholarships ==
=== James Morrison Jazz Scholarship ===
The 'James Morrison Jazz Scholarship' is open to solo instrumentalists. Six finalists are judged during the Generations In Jazz weekend. The winner receives $10,000 to assist in the development of their career.

=== Generations in Jazz Vocal Scholarship ===
The winner will receive $10,000 to assist in the development of their career.

=== City of Mt. Gambier National Big Bands ===
The Big Band part of the festival invites secondary school big bands from around Australia and New Zealand to compete for prize money of up to $7000 (Division 1). Bands compete for prize money in one of four divisions and stand-out musicians can be rewarded with a place in their division's "Superband". Several improvising musicians in Division 1 are nominated as potential "Future Finalists" of the James Morrison Jazz Scholarship, and one is selected to win $3,500 to assist their musical education. Divisions 1 and 2 superbands and future finalists all play at the Festival Finale. Division 5 (first introduced in 2013) bands are adjudicated only, though one band is selected to win an encouragement award.

== James Morrison Academy of Music ==
The James Morrison Academy of Music (previously known as the Generations In Jazz Academy) was a Jazz Performance course run by Graeme Lyall catering to young musicians. It was run in Mount Gambier, South Australia, and offered a one-year Diploma of Music through its affiliation with the University of South Australia. The course covered aural, theory, arranging and improvisation. All students rehearsed together as a large ensemble for 90 minutes, Monday to Friday. The ensemble had the opportunity to play with James Morrison at the Generations in Jazz Festival. In 2015 the academy moved into the Old Town Hall in Mt. Gambier.

The academy had its final teaching year in 2021, since opting to operate as a 'pop-up' academy. The closure is speculated to be due to a lack of funding and public displeasure over James Morrison's support of a sexual assault perpetrator.

== 2020 Cancellation ==
The 2020 Generations in Jazz competition was cancelled due to the COVID-19 global pandemic. In a statement released on 13 March, the board outlined their reasoning and their disappointment at having to cancel the event. "Of paramount importance to the Board is the safety and welfare of both the participants and the local community. The Board cannot offer any certainty to deliver the level of Risk management actions required to protect all involved under these current circumstances. It is a very disappointing time for all and we acknowledge the work and dedication of the students, Music Directors and auxilliary [sic] support."

The competition was also cancelled in 2021.

== 2023 return ==
The competition returned in 2023 following the pandemic. Dirty Loops performed at the event.

== Government-Funded Permanent Pavilions ==
In 2025, The South Australian Government invested $720,000 to build four permanent pavilions at OB Flat, Mount Gambier. These pavilions are projected to save $100,000 annually on event costs and generate $150,000 per year from storage fees. The savings and revenue will be reinvested in the festival, boosting participation and growth. The 2025 Festival was headlined by Gordon Goodwin's Big Phat Band.

== Results and history ==
=== 2026 ===
Division	1st	2nd	3rd
1	St Peter's College (SA)	Marryatville High School (SA)	Concordia College (SA)
2.1	Scotch College, Melbourne (VIC)	Trinity Grammar School, Kew (VIC)	Anglican Church Grammar School (QLD)
2.2	Eltham High School (VIC)	St Peter's College (SA)	Blackburn High School (VIC)
3.1	Caulfield Grammar School (VIC)	Nazareth Catholic College (SA)	Scotch College, Melbourne (VIC)
3.2	Westminster School (SA)	St Peter's College (SA)	Mount Gravatt State High School (QLD)
3.3	Rostrevor College (SA))	Kew High School (VIC)	Temple Christian College (SA)
4.1	Wilderness School (SA)	Loreto Mandeville Hall Toorak (VIC)	Cardijn College (SA)
4.2	Eltham High School (VIC)	Adelaid Botanic High School (SA)	St Martins Lutheran College (SA)
4+.1	Ballarat Clarendon College (VIC)	Huntingtower (VIC)	Unley High School (SA)
4+.2	St Peter's College (SA)	Westernport Regional Band (VIC)	St Monica's College Epping (VIC)
Vocal Div 1 Large	Concordia College (SA)	Wilderness School (SA)	Donvale Christian College (VIC)
Vocal Div 1 Small	Donvale Christian College (VIC)	St Peter's Girls' School (SA)	Loreto College Marryatville (SA)
Vocal Div 2 Large	Yarra Valley Grammar (VIC)	St Aloysius College, Adelaide (SA)	Walford Anglican School for Girls (SA)
Vocal Div 2 Small	Genazzano FCJ College (VIC)	Playford International College (SA)	St Andrews Christian College (VIC)
Vocal Div 3.1 Large	The Geelong College (VIC)	Balwyn High School (VIC)	Pembroke School (SA)
Vocal Div 3.2 Large	Immanuel College (SA)	St Dominic's Priory College (SA)	Williamstown High School (VIC)
Vocal Div 3 Small	Kelvin Grove state College (QLD)	Yarra Valley Grammar (VIC)	Penrhos College (WA)
Vocal Div 4	Concordia College (SA)	Emmaus Christian College (SA)	St Martins Lutheran College (SA)
Small Jazz Combo 1	Burnside High School (NZ)	Poco Music School (VIC)	St Peter's College (SA)
Small Jazz Combo 2	Yarra Valley Grammar (VIC)	Playford International College (SA0	St Peter's College (SA)
Small Jazz Combo 3.1	Loyola College Watsonia (VIC)	Unley High School (SA)	Presbyterian Ladies' College (VIC)
Small Jazz Combo 3.2	Genazzano FCJ College (VIC)	Belgrave Heights Christian School (VIC)	Caulfield Grammar School - Wheelers Hill Campus (VIC)

Individual Awards	Recipient
SBA Division 1 Best Rhythm Section	St Peter's College, Adelaide (SA)
SBA Division 1 Yamaha/Billy Hyde Most Outstanding Trumpet Player	Oscar Kleinig
SBA Division 1 Callisto Family Most Promising Pianist	Ryan Weinert
SBA Division 2 Maurice Ledoueff Most Outstanding Saxophone Section	Trinity Grammar School, Kew (VIC)
SBA Division 2 Callisto Family Most Promising Pianist	Lingus Gnani
SBA Division 4+ Nick Mulder Memorial Award	Rostrevor College (SA)
SBA Division 5 Spirit of Generations Award	Victory Christian School (VIC)
SJC Division 3.1 Callisto Small Jazz Combo Spirit Award	Flinders Christian Community College Carrum Downs Campus (VIC)
SJC Division 3.2 Callisto Small Jazz Combo Spirit Award	Belgrave Heights Christian School (VIC)
VEA Division 1 Callisto Family Most Promising Vocal Improvisor	Abigail Hawkes
VEA Division 2 Callisto Family Most Promising Vocal Improvisor	Joel Jayanthan
VEA Division 4 Spirit of Generations Award	Yarra Valley Grammar (VIC)
Music Directors Award - Vocal	Stacey Theel
Music Directors Award - Stage Band	Deanna Whelan
Vocal Jazz Scholarship	Marina Olijnyk
James Morrison Jazz Scholarship	Johnny Turner
Future Finalist - Instrumental	Isaac Wicklein
Future Finalist - Instrumental	Isaac Kennedy
Future Finalist - Instrumental	Ned Manifold
Future Finalist - Instrumental	Hugh Loipersberger
Future Finalist - Instrumental	Elinor Hughes
Future Finalist - Winner Award	Marco Rugari

=== 2025 ===
Division	1st	2nd	3rd
1	St Peter's College (SA)	Marryatville High School (SA)	Viewbank College (VIC)
2.1	Chatswood High School (NSW) & Anglican Church Grammar School (QLD)	Rostrevor College (SA)	Immanuel College (SA)
2.2	Concordia College (SA)	Westminster School (SA)	St Peter's College (SA)
3.1	St Peter's Girls' School (SA)	Scotch College (VIC)	St Andrews Christian College (VIC)
3.2	Westbourne Grammar School (VIC)	Wilderness School (SA)	Blackfriars Priory School (SA)
4.1	Nazareth Catholic College (SA)	Wilderness School (SA)	Adelaide Botanic High School (SA)
4.2	St Aloysius College (SA)	Parade College (VIC)	Eltham High School (VIC)
4+	Emmaus Christian College (SA)	Wesley / Penrhos College (WA)	Pedare Christian College (SA)
5 (Spirit of Generations Award)	The Essington School (NT)	-	-
Vocal Div 1 Large	Wilderness School (SA)	St Peter's Girls' School (SA)	Wesley College (VIC)
Vocal Div 1 Small	Wesley College (VIC)	Donvale Christian College (VIC)	Yarra Valley Grammar (VIC)
Vocal Div 2 Large	Brighton Secondary School (VIC)	St Aloysius College, Adelaide (SA)	Immanuel College (SA)
Vocal Div 2 Small	Scotch College (SA)	Temple Christian College (SA)	St Mary's College (SA)
Vocal Div 3 Small	Trinity College (SA)	St Leonard's College (VIC)	Peninsula Grammar (VIC)
Vocal Div 3.1 Large	Wesley College (VIC)	Loreto Mandeville Hall (VIC)	Saint Ignatius' College( SA)
Vocal Div 3.2 Large	Trinity College (SA)	St John's Grammar School (SA)	Brighton Grammar School (VIC)
Small Jazz Combo 1	Westminster School (SA)	Rostrevor College (SA)	Tenison Woods College (SA)
Small Jazz Combo 2	Genazzano FCJ College (VIC)	Prince Alfred College (SA)	Westbourne Grammar School (VIC)
Small Jazz Combo 3	Concordia College (SA)	Yarra Valley Grammar (VIC)	Hobart College (TAS)

Award	Recipient
SBA Division 1 Best Rhythm Section	St Peter's College, Adelaide (SA)
SBA Division 1 Yamaha Wayne Bergeron Most Outstanding Trumpet Player	Elinor Hughes
SBA Division 1 Callisto Family Best Pianist	Thomas Dower
SBA Division 2 Maurice Ledoueff Most Outstanding Saxophone Section	Concordia College (SA)
SBA Division 2 Callisto Family Best Pianist	Callum Chong
SBA Division 3 Best Trombone Section	Wilderness School (SA)
SBA Division 4+ Nick Mulder Memorial Award	Blackburn High School (VIC)
VEA Division 1 Callisto Family Most Promising Soloist	Joey Fitzgerald
Music Directors Award - Vocal	Sari Noble
Music Directors Award - Stage Band	Phillip Reichman
Vocal Jazz Scholarship	Maisie Aitken
James Morrison Jazz Scholarship	Rhys Moore
Future Finalist - Instrumental	Ned Manifold
Future Finalist - Instrumental	Thomas Dower
Future Finalist - Instrumental	Elinor Hughes
Future Finalist - Instrumental	Luka Ferguson
Future Finalist - Vocal	Zoe Young
Future Finalist - Vocal	Joey Fitzgerald

=== 2024 ===
Division	1st	2nd	3rd
1	St Peter's College (SA)	Marryatville High School (SA)	St Leonard's College (VIC)
2.1	Westminster School (SA)	Peninsula Grammar (VIC)	Carey Baptist Grammar School (VIC)
2.2	Immanuel College (SA)	Concordia College (SA)	Eltham High School (VIC)
3.1	Aquinas College (VIC)	Caulfield Grammar School - Caulfield Campus (VIC)	Prince Alfred College (SA)
3.2	Ballarat Clarendon College (VIC)	Trinity College (SA)	Brighton Secondary School (SA)
4.1	St Martin's Lutheran College (SA)	Carey Baptist Grammar School (VIC)	St Kevin's College (VIC)
4.2	Genazzano FCJ College (VIC)	Xavier College (VIC)	Anglican Church Grammar School (QLD)
4+	Castlemaine Secondary College (VIC)	Pedare Christian College (SA)	Mazenod College (VIC)
Vocal Div 1 Large	Wilderness School (SA)	Concordia College (SA)	Loreto College (SA)
Vocal Div 1 Small	Wesley College (VIC)	Ruyton Girls' School (VIC)	Yarra Valley Grammar (VIC)
Vocal Div 2 Large	Wilderness School (SA)	Pulteney Grammar School (SA)	Brighton Secondary School (SA)
Vocal Div 2 Small	Peninsula Grammar (VIC)	Temple Christian College (SA)	Loreto College (SA)
Vocal Div 3 Large	St Aloysius College (SA)	Marryatville High School (SA)	Brighton Secondary School (SA)
Vocal Div 3 Small	Playford International College (SA)	Temple Christian College (SA)	St Andrews Christian College (VIC)
Small Jazz Combo 1	Peninsula Grammar (VIC)	St Andrews Christian College (VIC)	Temple Christian College (SA)
Small Jazz Combo 2	Wesley College, Perth	Donvale Christian College (VIC)	Woodville High School (South Australia)
Small Jazz Combo 3	Viewbank College (VIC)	Westbourne Grammar School (VIC)	Blackburn High School (VIC)

=== 2023 ===
Division	1st	2nd	3rd
1	Marryatville High School (SA)	Prince Alfred College (SA)	St Peters College (SA)
2	Balwyn High School (VIC)	Xavier College (VIC)	Marryatville High School (SA)
3.1	Peninsula Grammar (VIC)	Elizabeth College (TAS)	St Mary's College (SA)
3.2	Hobart College (TAS)	St Leonard's College (VIC)	Prince Alfred College (SA)
4.1	Aquinas College (VIC)	Westbourne Grammar (VIC)	Christian Brothers College (SA)
4.2	Nazareth Catholic College (SA)	Trinity College (SA)	Wilderness School (SA)
4+	Pedare Christian College (SA)	Walford Anglican School For Girls (SA)	Ballarat Clarendon College (VIC)
Small Jazz Combo 1	Peninsula Grammar (VIC)	Carey Baptist College (WA)	Brighton Secondary School (SA)
Small Jazz Combo 2	Hobart College (TAS)	Trinity Grammar School (VIC)	St Peters Girls' School (SA)
Vocal Div 1 Large	St Peters Girls' School (SA)	Concordia College (SA)	Marryatville High School (SA)
Vocal Div 1 Small	Wesley College - St Kilda Road Campus (VIC) and Loreto College (SA)		Geelong Grammar (VIC)
Vocal Div 2 Large	Donvale Christian College (VIC)	Walford Anglican School for Girls (SA)	Seymour College (SA)
Vocal Div 3 Large	Wesley College - St Kilda Road Campus (VIC)	Loreto College (SA)	Marryatville High School (SA)
Vocal Open Small	St Peter's Girls' School (SA)	Donvale Christian College (VIC)	St Mary's College (SA)

=== 2022 (Online Competition) ===
Division	1st	2nd	3rd
1	Marryatville High School (SA) and St Leonard's College (VIC)	St Peter's College (SA)	John Paul College (QLD)
2	Marryatville High School (SA)	Walford Anglican School for Girls (SA) and St Michael's Grammar School (VIC)	Westminster School (SA)
3	Peninsula Grammar (VIC)	Ringwood Secondary College (VIC)	Penleigh and Essendon Grammar School (VIC)
4	St Peter's College (SA)	St Peter's Girls' School (SA)	Trinity College South Australia (SA)
4+	Rockhampton Grammar School (QLD)	Tenison Woods College Mount Gambier (SA)	Glenunga International High School (SA)
Jazz Combo	Wesley College (VIC)	Emmaus Christian College (SA)	Thomas Hassall Anglican College (NSW) and Mentone Grammar School (VIC)
Vocal Div 1 Large SSAA	Wilderness School (SA)	Sheldon College (QLD)	Walford Anglican School for Girls (SA)
Vocal Div 1 Large SATB	Marryatville High School (SA)	Wesley College (VIC)	John Paul College (QLD)
Vocal Div 1 Small	Wesley College (VIC)	St Peter's College (SA)	Aquinas College (VIC)
Vocal Div 2 SSA	Wilderness School (SA)	St Monica's College (VIC) and Westminster School (SA)	
Vocal Div 2 SAB	Marryatville High School (SA)	Nazareth Catholic College (SA)	Temple Christian College (SA)
Vocal Div 2 TTB	Anglican Church Grammar School (QLD)		
Vocal Div 3 Treble	St Alysious (SA)	Wesley College (VIC)	Korowa Anglican Girls School (VIC)
Vocal Div 3 Mixed	Marryatville High School (SA)	Ringwood Secondary College (VIC)	St Francis de Sales College Mount Barker (SA)
Vocal Div 3 Male	St Peter's College (SA)	Christian Brothers College (SA)	Rostrevor College (SA)
Vocal Open Small	St Peter's Girls' School (SA)	St Mary's College (SA)	Tenison Woods College Mount Gambier (SA)

=== 2019 ===
Division	1st	2nd	3rd
1	Prince Alfred College (SA)	Blackburn High School (VIC)	St Leonard's College (VIC)
2.1	Palmerston North Boys' High (NZ)	Blackburn High School (VIC)	Ringwood Secondary College (VIC)
2.2	Balwyn High School (VIC)	Concordia College (SA)	St Mary's College (SA)
3.1	Genazzano FCJ College (VIC)	Lowther Hall Anglican (VIC) & St Peter's Girls' School (SA)	Balwyn High School (VIC)
3.2	Siena College (VIC)	Kirrawee High School (NSW)	Blackfriars Priory School (SA)
4.1	Mentone Grammar(VIC)	Wilderness School (SA)	John Monash Science School (VIC) & St Michael's College (SA)
4.2	Temple Christian College (SA)	Walford Anglican School for Girls (SA)	Blackburn High School (VIC)
4.3	Our Lady of Sion College (VIC)	Parkdale Secondary College (VIC)	Killester College (VIC)
4 Mixed	Melbourne Girls' College (VIC)	St Paul's College (SA)	Tenison Woods College (SA)
Vocal Div 1 Large	Marryatville High School (SA)	Walford Anglican School for Girls (SA)	Princes Hill Secondary College (VIC)
Vocal Div 1 Small	Victorian College of the Arts Secondary School (VIC)	Caulfield Grammar (VIC)	Aquinas College (VIC)
Vocal Open Small	St Peter's Girls' School (SA)	Temple Christian College (SA)	Donvale Christian College (VIC)
Vocal Div 2	St Peter's Girls' School (SA)	St Leonard's College (VIC)	Immanuel College (SA)
Vocal Div 3.1	Nazareth Catholic Community College (SA)	Immanuel College (SA)	Wantirna College (VIC)
Vocal Div 3.2	Toorak College (VIC)	Wilderness School (SA) & Princes Hill Secondary College (VIC)	Pedare Christian College (SA)
Vocal Div 4	Albert Park College (VIC)	St Martins Lutheran College (SA) & Carey Baptist College (WA)	Scotch College (SA) & St Bede's College (VIC)
Small Jazz Combo Div 1.1	Victorian College of the Arts Secondary School (VIC)	Camberwell High School (VIC)	Victorian College of the Arts Secondary School (VIC)
Small Jazz Combo Div 1.2	Concordia College (SA)	Blackburn High School (VIC)	Brighton Secondary School (SA)

=== 2018 ===
Division	1st	2nd	3rd
1	Marryatville High School (SA)	Blackburn High School (VIC)	St Leonard's College (VIC)
2.1	St Peter's College (SA) & Caulfield Grammar School (1) (VIC)	-	Concordia College (SA)
2.2	Balwyn High School (VIC)	Westminster School (SA)	Rostrevor College (SA)
3.1	Scotch College (WA)	Peninsula Grammar (VIC)	Eltham High School (VIC)
3.2	St Helena Secondary College (VIC)	Lowther Hall Anglican (VIC)	Scotch College (VIC)
4.1	Macleod College (VIC)	Our Lady of Sion College (VIC)	Rostrevor College (SA)
4.2	St Helena Secondary College (VIC)	Blackburn High School (VIC)	Glenunga International High School (SA)
4.3	Killester College (VIC)	Mount Waverley Secondary College (VIC)	St Columba’s College (VIC)
4 Mixed	Waverley Christian College (VIC)	Albert Park College (VIC)	Macleod College (VIC)
Vocal Div 1 Large	Marryatville High School (SA)	Walford Anglican Girls (SA)	Immanuel College (SA) & Wilderness School (SA)
Vocal Div 1 Small	Aquinas College (VIC)	Marryatville High School (SA)	Caulfield Grammar School (VIC)
Vocal Div 2	Marryatville High School (SA)	Saint Ignatius College (SA)	St Mary's College (SA)
Vocal Div 3	St John's Grammar School (SA)	Pulteney Grammar School (SA)	Aquinas College (VIC)
Vocal Div 4	St Bede’s College (VIC)	Williamstown High School (VIC)	Whitefriars College (VIC)
Small Jazz Combo Div 1	Marryatville High School (SA)	Balwyn High School (VIC)	Waverley Christian College (VIC)
Small Jazz Combo Div 2	Victorian College of the Arts Secondary School (VIC)	Victorian College of the Arts Secondary School (VIC)	Carey Baptist College (WA)

Award	Recipient
Mauri Le Doeuff Sax Section Award	Balwyn High School (VIC)
James Morrison Jazz Scholarship	Jayden Blockley
GIJ Vocal Scholarship	Stephanie Russell
Pat Corrigan Future Finalist Award	Thomas Levings (Trombone)
Ron Denning Award	Jazzie Vanua (Division 1) Phoebe Bengough (Division 1) Lily Seymour (Division 2) Imogen Spendlove (Division 2)
Alexander Gregory Piano Award	Marco Callisto (Division 1)
Wenger Band Directors Award	Philip Walsh
Golden Mouthpiece Award	Emma Simpson-Smith
Bach Trombone Award	Siena College
Yamaha Drums & Winston Music Drummers Award (Div 4)	Alex Whaley
Yamaha Drums & Winston Music Drummers Award (Div 5)	Jacob Bellingham

=== 2017 ===
Division	1st	2nd	3rd
1	Blackburn High School (VIC)	Marryatville High School (SA)	Eltham High School (VIC)
2.1	Wesley College (VIC)	St Peter's College (SA)	Prince Alfred College (SA)
2.2	Scotch College (VIC)	Westminster School (SA)	St Kevin's College (VIC)
3.1	Eltham High School (VIC)	Concordia College (SA)	Carey Baptist Grammar School (VIC)
3.2	Elizabeth College (TAS)	Peninsula Grammar (VIC)	The Geelong College (VIC)
4.1	Temple Christian College (SA)	John Monash Science School (VIC)	St Michael's Grammar School (VIC)
4.2	Waverley Christian College (VIC)	The Knox School (VIC)	Ruyton Girls' School (VIC)
4 Mixed	St Paul’s College (SA)	Glenunga International (SA)	Prince Alfred College (SA)
Vocal Div 1 Large	Immanuel College (SA)	Wilderness School (SA)	Marryatville High School (SA)
Vocal Div 1 Small	St Peter's Girls' School (SA)	Princes Hill Secondary College (VIC)	Ruyton Girls' School (VIC)
Vocal Div 2	St Peter's Girls' School (SA)	Wesley College (VIC)	Marryatville High School (SA)
Vocal Div 3	Aquinas College (VIC)	Ruyton Girls' School (VIC)	Viewbank College (VIC)
Vocal Div 4	Waverley Christian College (VIC)	Ruyton Girls' School (VIC)	Parkdale Secondary (VIC)
Small Jazz Combo	Marryatville High School (SA)	Balwyn High School (VIC)	Princes Hill Secondary College (VIC)

Award	Recipient
Maurice (Maurie) Le Doeuff Sax Section Award	Manly Selective Campus
James Morrison Jazz Scholarship	Flora Carbo (Alto Saxophone)
GIJ Vocal Scholarship	Amelia Evans
Blanchard Award	Emily Gittins Charlie Lodge Tom McCracken
Pat Corrigan Future Finalist Award	Callum Mintzis (Trombone)
Ron Denning Award	Sarah Brownridge (Division 1) Jazmine Vanua (Division 2) Izzy Norman (Division 2)
Alexander Gregory Piano Award	Marco Callisto (Division 1) Brad Bellard (Division 2)
Wenger Band Directors Award	Mat Noble
Golden Mouthpiece Award	Alistair Hardie
P-Bone Trombone Award	Elizabeth College (TAS)
Yamaha Drums & Winston Music Drummers Award	Nicholas Costa

=== 2016 ===
Award	Recipient
GIJ Vocal Scholarship	Kayleigh Pincott (QLD)
James Morrison Jazz Scholarship	Matthew Nicholls

=== 2015 ===
Division	1st	2nd	3rd	'Golden Mouthpiece' Award
1	Marryatville High School (SA)	Wesley College SKR (VIC)	St Leonard's College & Blackburn High School (VIC)	Wesley College SKR (VIC) - Lead Trumpet
2	Marryatville High School (SA)	Concordia College (South Australia) (SA)	Christian College Geelong (VIC)	
3.1	Yarra Valley Grammar (VIC)	Elizabeth College (TAS)	St John's Grammar School (SA)	
3.2	Eltham High School (VIC)	Prince Alfred College (SA)	The Peninsula School (VIC)	
4.1	Shalom Catholic College (QLD)	Immanuel College (SA)	Pedare Christian College (SA)	
4.2	Wilderness School (SA)	St Columba’s College (VIC)	St Monica's College (VIC)	

=== 2014 ===
Division	1st	2nd	3rd	Honorable Mentions
1	Blackburn High School (VIC)	Marryatville High School (SA)	Northcote High School (VIC)	
2	Caulfield Grammar School (VIC)	Marryatville High School (SA)	Prince Alfred College (SA)	
3.1	Prince Alfred College (SA)	Marryatville High School (SA)	Eltham High School (VIC)	
3.2	Yarra Valley Grammar (VIC)	Concordia College (SA)	Wilderness School (SA)	
4	Prince Alfred College (SA)	Eltham High School (VIC)	Bendigo SE Secondary College (VIC)	
Vocal Div 1	Marryatville High School (SA)	St John's Grammar School (SA)	St. Mary's College (SA)	St John's Grammar School (SA)
Vocal Div 2	Pembroke School (SA)	Marryatville High School (SA)	Immanuel College (SA)	
Vocal Div 3	St Michael's College (SA)	The Geelong College (VIC)	Marymount College (SA)	

Award	Recipient
Mauri Le Doeuff Perpetual Award	Balwyn High School (VIC)
Schlager Music Directors Award	Nathaniel Poynter, Yarra Valley Grammar (VIC)
James Morrison Jazz Scholarship	David Goodwin (SA)
James Morrison Golden Mouthpiece Award	Matthew Todd, Blackburn High School (VIC)
City of Mt Gambier Vocal Scholarship	Olivia Chindamo (VIC)

=== 2013 ===
Division	1st	2nd	3rd
1	Marryatville High School (SA)	Scotch College (VIC)	Prince Alfred College (SA), Eltham High School (VIC)
2	Immanuel College (SA)	Balwyn High School (VIC)	Marryatville High School (SA)
3.1	Trinity Grammar School (VIC)	Loreto Mandeville Hall (VIC)	The Geelong College (VIC)
3.2	Scotch College (VIC)	The Peninsula School (VIC)	Lavalla Catholic College (VIC)
4	Tenison Woods College (SA)	St Bernard's College (VIC)	Yarra Valley Grammar (VIC)
Vocal Div 1	St. Mary's College (SA)	Wilderness School (SA)	Marryatville High School (SA)
Vocal Div 2	Pembroke School (SA)	St Peter's Girls' School (SA)	Concordia College (SA)

Award	Recipient
Mauri Le Doeuff Perpetual Award	Concordia College (SA)
Schlager Music Directors Award	Leith Sutterd (SA) St John's Grammar School (SA)
James Morrison Jazz Scholarship	Oli Nelson (NSW)
City of Mt Gambier Vocal Scholarship	Hannah Cameron (VIC)

=== 2012 ===
Division	1st	2nd	3rd	Honorable Mentions
1	Marryatville High School (SA)	Scotch College (VIC)	Blackburn High School (VIC)	
2	Orange High School (NSW)	Immanuel College (SA)	St Leonards College (VIC)	
3.1	St Agnes Parish School (NSW)	St John's Grammar School (SA)	Prince Alfred College (SA)	
3.2	Prince Alfred College (SA)	Loreto Mandeville Hall (VIC)	Scotch College (VIC)	
Vocal Div 1	Princes Hill Secondary College (VIC)	Marryatville High School (SA)	Wesley College, St Kilda (VIC)	
Vocal Div 2	St Ignatius College (SA)	St John's Grammar School (SA)	Ringwood Secondary College (VIC)	St John's Grammar School (SA)

Award	Recipient
Mauri Le Doeuff Perpetual Award	Concordia College (SA)
Winston Music & Schlager Music Directors Jazz Spirit Award	Alan Geddie - Riverland
James Morrison Jazz Scholarship	Chris Travaglini (WA)
City of Mt Gambier Vocal Scholarship	Liam Budge (ACT)

=== 2011 ===
Division	1st	2nd	3rd	Honorable Mentions
1	Marryatville High School (SA)	Blackburn High School (VIC)	Scotch College (VIC)	
2	Orange High School (NSW)	Immanuel College (SA)	St Leonards College (VIC)	Prince Alfred College (SA), Concordia College (SA)
3.1	Tenison Woods College (SA)	Trinity Grammar School (VIC)	St John's Grammar School (SA)	
3.2	St Agnes Parish School (NSW)	Loreto Mandeville Hall (VIC)	Scotch College (VIC)	Riverland Stage Band (SA)
Vocal	St Johns Grammar School (SA)	Princes Hill Secondary College (VIC)	Wilderness School (SA)	

Award	Recipient
Mauri Le Doeuff Perpetual Award	Concordia College (SA)
Yamaha Music Directors Jazz Spirit Award	Mat Duniam and Gemma Horbury (VIC)
Pat Corrigan Musicians & Artists Fund	David Goodwin (SA)
GIJ Vocal Scholarship	Megan Crocombe (QLD)

=== 2010 ===
Division	1st	2nd	3rd	Honorable Mentions
1	Wesley College, St Kilda (VIC)	Blackburn High School (VIC)	Scotch College (VIC)	
2	Blackburn High School (VIC)	Wesley College, Glen Waverley (VIC)	Marryatville High School (SA)	Immanuel College (SA)
3.1	Prince Alfred College (SA)	Rostrevor College (SA)	Immanuel College (SA)	
3.2	Wesley College, Glen Waverley (VIC)	The Geelong College (VIC)	St. Aloysius College (SA)	

Award	Recipient
Mauri Le Doeuff Perpetual Award	Yarra Valley Grammar (VIC)
Yamaha Music Directors Award	Mary Robbie (VIC)
James Morrison Jazz scholarship	Harry Sutherland (NSW)
GIJ Vocal Scholarship	Kate Kelsey-Sugg (VIC)

=== 2009 ===
Division	1st	2nd	3rd	Honorable Mentions
1	NSW Performing Arts Unit (NSW)	Wesley College, St Kilda (VIC)	Rostrevor College (SA)	
2	Eltham High School (VIC)	Marryatville High School (SA)	Scotch College (VIC)	Blackburn High School (VIC)
3.1	Blackburn High School (VIC)	Riverland Stage Band (SA)	Brighton Secondary School (SA)	
3.2	Yarra Valley Grammar (VIC)	Faith Lutheran College (SA)	St Peter's College (SA)	

Award	Recipient
James Morrison Jazz scholarship	Daniel Clohesy (SA)
GIJ Vocal Scholarship	Sarah McKenzie (VIC)

== List of set pieces ==
=== 2018 ===
Division	Song	Composer
1	Hunter	R. J. Irwin
2	Mambo for Mike	Nick Mulder
3	Right in the Block	Thomas Ghea
4	Gospel Hustle	Jordan Murray
4+ (Mixed Instrumentation)	Gospel Hustle	Jordan Murray
5	Windscreen Swing	William (Bill) Broughton
Vocal Div 1 (Large)	Your Hand in Mine	Naomi Crellin
Vocal Div 1 (Small)	Stoned Soul Picnic	Laury Nyro
Vocal Div 2	Cosita Davina	Emma Pask
Vocal Open (Small)	Open Season	Naomi Crellin
Vocal Div 3	Bury the Story	Luke Thompson
Vocal Div 4	Where Do We Go From Here	Naomi Crellin, Nick Begbie

2017

Division	Song	Composer
1	Back Home Again in Indiana	
2	Song for Tuck	Graeme Lyall
3	Big Duke	Ross Irwin
4	Second Take	Nick Mulder
5	Settling the Score	Ed Wilson
Vocal Div 1 (Large)	Fruitcake	Naomi Crellin, Nick Begbie
Vocal Div 1 (Small)	Grass Grows Greener	Anders Edenroth
Vocal Div 2	Sometimes I Feel Like a Motherless Child	Naomi Crellin
Vocal Div 3	My Boat	Andrew Piper
Vocal Div 4	Two Roads	Naomi Crellin

=== 2015 ===
Division	Song	Composer
1	Lucidity	Mark Nightingale
2	Boston Strong Boy	Ross Irwin
3	How Much Sleeps	Nick Mulder
4	The 3D's	Bill Broughton

2014

Division	Song	Composer
1	There's The Rub	Gordon Goodwin
2	Hudson Dusters	Ross Irwin
3	The Real McCoy	Nick Mulder
