= Special interest high schools in South Australia =

South Australian high schools that offer specialised courses and programs. Some schools have a selection process for entry into their special programs.

- Aberfoyle Park High School, Ignite: Students with High Intellectual Potential
- Adelaide Botanic High School, Science, Technology, Engineering and Mathematics (STEM)
- Adelaide High School, Language, Cricket, Rowing and centre of hearing impaired
- Australian Science and Mathematics School, Science/Maths
- Blackwood High School, Netball
- Brighton Secondary School, Music and Volleyball
- Charles Campbell Secondary School, Dance/Drama/Music/Performing Arts
- Glenunga International High School, Ignite: Students with High Intellectual Potential
- Golden Grove High School, Dance/Drama
- Grant High School, Baseball
- Heathfield High School, Volleyball
- Henley High School, Sport and Physical Education
- Marryatville High School, Music and Tennis
- Mount Gambier High School, athletics, cricket, Australian rules football and netball
- Pasadena High School, Basketball
- Playford International College formerly Fremont–Elizabeth City High School, Music
- Seaton High School, Baseball, (previously Students with High Intellectual Potential (SHIP))
- Seaview High School, Tennis
- The Heights School
- Underdale High School, Soccer, music, dancing and choir
- Urrbrae Agricultural High School, Agriculture
- Wirreanda High School, Sport and Physical Education
- Woodville High School, Music

The four Special Interest Music Centres cover four distinct geographical areas of Adelaide, and were set up in the respective schools over a two-year period: Brighton and Marryatville High Schools (1976), Woodville High School (1977) and Fremont-Elizabeth City High School (1978).

== Other specialist schools ==
- Australian Science and Mathematics School, Science and Mathematics
- Gleeson College, Football (Soccer)
