= Blackburn High School =

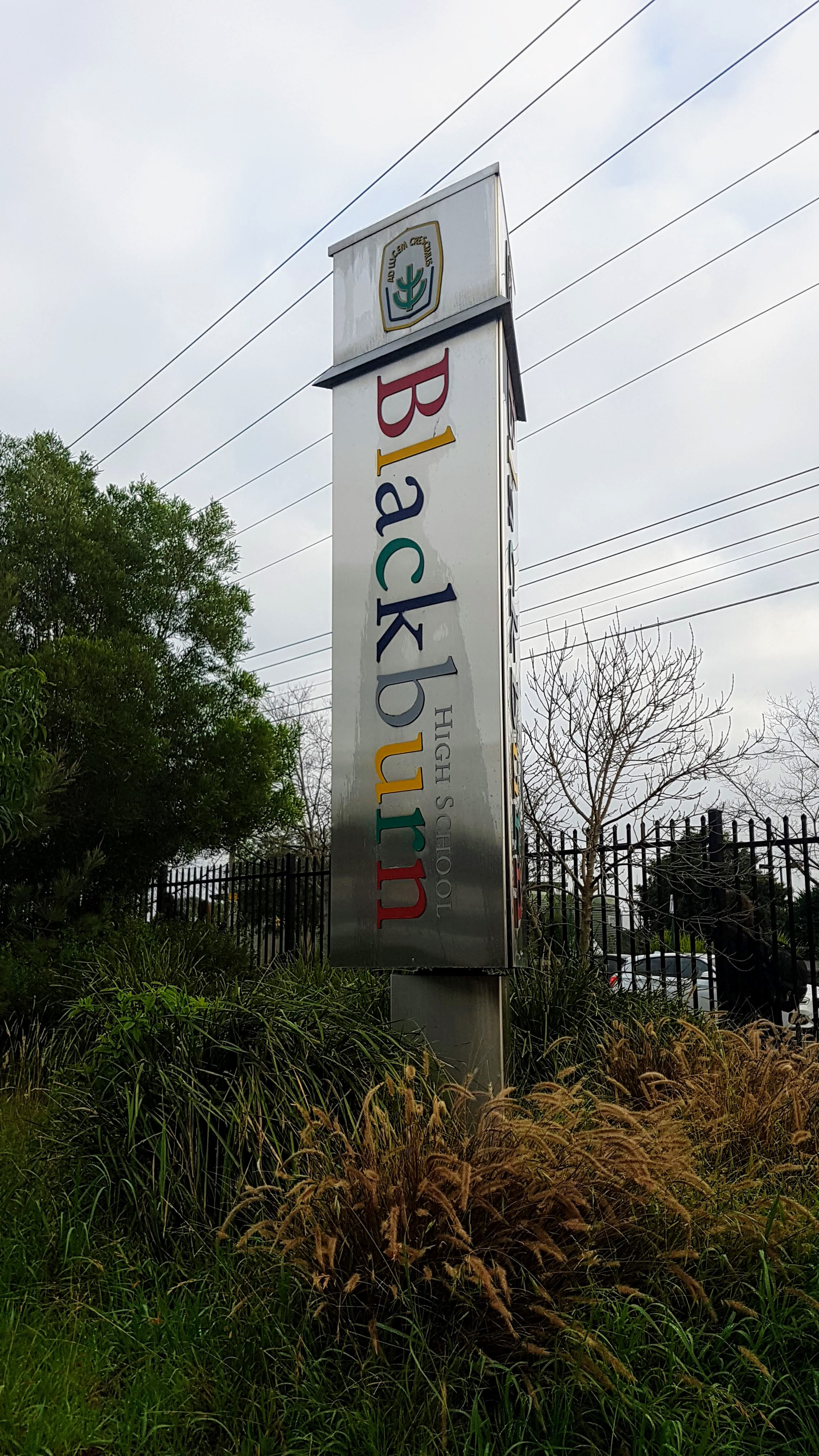
- Blackburn High School sign

Location
- 58/62 Springfield Road; Blackburn North, Victoria 3130; Australia; 37.8109°S 145.1500°E

Information
- Type: Public
- Motto: Ad Lucem Crescimus (Growing Towards the Light)
- Established: 1956
- Principal: Joanna Alexander
- Years: 7–12
- Enrollment: 1321
- Colours: Green, white, black
- Website: www.blackburnhs.vic.edu.au

Blackburn High School is a co-educational public secondary school for children from years 7 to 12 in Blackburn North, a suburb of Melbourne, Victoria, Australia, founded in 1956. The school is notable for its music curriculum and extracurriculars, particularly for its early adoption of music education in government schooling.

== History ==
The land for Blackburn High School was acquired from the Pearce Family, who grew peaches and cherries. In 1955 (five years before opening) the site was described "still in the cherry orchard state", however the Lilydale Express reported that a "Mr. Percy" from Lilydale High School would be promoted to head-master of Blackburn.

Blackburn High School's instrumental music program began in 1965 under the guidance of teacher Renee Maddocks and principal Arthur Beaumont.

== Extracurricular activities ==
=== Music ===
The school has performed in outside events such as the Monterey Jazz Festival, Floriade, International Society for Music Education Conference, Victorian School Music Festival, the 71st Annual Midwest Clinic, and the local Whitehorse Christmas Carols.

It has also competed in the Echuca-Moama School Bands Festival, Royal South Street Eisteddfod, Generations in Jazz Competition, and the Essentially Ellington High School Jazz Band Competition and Festival.

The school has released three albums, one in 1977, and two from the Midwest Clinic in 2017.

Generations in Jazz Results
Awards	1st Place	2nd Place	3rd Place	Honourable Mention
Big Band
Division 1	2017, 2014	2019, 2018, 2011, 2010	2015, 2012	
Division 2	2010	2019 (2.1)	2026 (2.2)	2009
Division 3	2009 (3.1)			
Division 4		2019 (4.2), 2018 (4.2)		
Small Jazz Combo
Division 1		2019 (1.2)		
Division 3			2024	

- SBA Division 4+ Nick Mulder Memorial Award - 2025
- James Morrison Golden Mouthpiece Award - 2014

== Notable alumni ==
- Christos Tsiolkas – Novelist
- Ross Irwin – Trumpet player in Melbourne based band 'The Cat Empire'.
- Shannon Barnett – Trombonist, Bell Awards winner for Young Australian Jazz Artist (2007)
- Daniel Merriweather – R&B Singer/Songwriter.
- Reuben Morgan – Singer/Songwriter at the Hillsong Church
- Darren James – 3AW Radio Announcer
- Don Scott – Former Hawthorn AFL Football Club Captain & Premiership Player & South Adelaide coach.
- Dee Ryall MP – Former member for Mitcham and Ringwood in the Victorian Parliament
- Jenny Donnet – Olympic and Commonwealth Games diving athlete
- Steve Irons – Federal Member for Swan (WA) 2007
- Jacinta Parsons – Radio host
- Timothy Fehring – student who died on a school camp
- Kynan Brown – Former Melbourne AFL Player
- Elizabeth Minter – Former professional Tennis Player
- Trung Luu MP – Member for Victorian legislative council & Former councillor for City of Brimbank
- Erica Sigmont – Track and Field Athlete
- Martin Grant – Fashion Designer

== Notable staff ==
- Michael Cigler – Multicultural Historian
