= Graeme Lyall =

Australian saxophonist, composer and arranger

Graeme Lyall AM
- Born: 25 January 1942 (age 84); Melbourne, Australia
- Genres: Jazz, big band, classical orchestration
- Occupations: Musician; composer; arranger; teacher
- Instruments: Saxophone; flute; clarinet
- Years active: 1958–present
- Label: Graeme Lyall Music

Graeme William Lyall (AM), is an Australian saxophonist, composer and arranger. He became a Member of the Order of Australia on 26 January 2003: "For service to music as Artistic Director of the Western Australian Youth Jazz Orchestra, and as a musical director, composer and performer."

== Biography ==
Graeme William Lyall was born in Melbourne, Australia on January 25, 1942. In his growing up years he trained as a musician with Frank Smith in his native city. He began playing professionally in Melbourne at the age of 17.

In 1961 Lyall moved to Sydney when he began studying at the New South Wales State Conservatorium of Music. While a student there he played regularly at the El Rocco club in Sydney from 1961-1963. By the time he was 22 years old he was working as a woodwind player and a music arranger in the TCN 9 Orchestra. His work with the group included writing arrangements for Bobby Limb, Dave Allen, Don Lane, John Laws and Stuart Wagstaff.

In 1969 Lyall was a founding member of the Daly-Wilson Big Band. In 1970 he toured Japan as a member of Don Burrows's septet. In 1971 he took a composing, arranging and record production role at Armstrong Studios and moved back to Melbourne. He was a member of the ABC Melbourne Showband from 1974-1977. He became the director of music at GTV-9 Melbourne, including work on the Don Lane Show. During his time in Melbourne, Graeme was the winner of the Best Arrangement at the World Popular Song Festival four times and winner of the Australian Writers and Art Directors Guild award for the Best Music for a Television Commercial (Hallmark Greeting Cards).

Lyall often did not record under his own name. He performed on recordings by John Sangster (1974), Tony Gould (1984, c mid-1990s), and Judy Bailey (1992).

== Honours ==
He is the 2015 inductee into the Australian Jazz Bell Awards Hall of Fame.

He became a Member of the Order of Australia on 26 January 2003, "For service to music as Artistic Director of the Western Australian Youth Jazz Orchestra, and as a musical director, composer and performer."

He currently (2023) lives in Mount Gambier.

== Generations in Jazz ==
Graeme was the Division 2 adjudicator at Generations in Jazz, an annual festival that provides an opportunity for High School big bands from around Australia to compete against each other and for students to hear live performances from the likes of, John Morrison, Ross Irwin and several others.

== Discography ==
=== Albums ===
Title	Album details	Peak chart positions
Title	Album details	AUS
Feel So Good	Released: June 1982; Format: LP; Label: Hammard (HAM 074)	83
Love Blues and Other Fiction (with Joe Chindamo)	Released: 2004; Format: CD; Label: Newmarket Music (NEW 3163.2)	-
Smokingun (with The Joe Chindamo Trio)	Released: 2006; Format: CD; Label: Newmarket Music (NEW 3180.2)	-
Esperança (with The Con Artists)	Released: 2006; Format: CD, Digital download; Label: The Con Artists (CA6); Note: Lead Vocals – Megan Washington	-
The Hunters & Pointers (with John Hoffman, Tony Gould, Ben Robertson, Tony Floyd)	Released: 2013; Format: CD, Digital download; Label:	-
Seasons of Love (with Gian Slater, Eddie Perfect and Tony Gould )	Released: 2013; Format: CD, Digital download; Label: Move – MD 3365	-

== Awards and nominations ==
=== ARIA Music Awards ===
The ARIA Music Awards is an annual awards ceremony that recognises excellence, innovation, and achievement across all genres of Australian music. They commenced in 1987.

Year	Nominee / work	Award	Result	Ref.
2007	Smokingun (with Joe Chindamo)	Best Jazz Album	Nominated	
2014	The Hunters & Pointers (with John Hoffman, Tony Gould, Ben Robertson, Tony Floyd)	Best Jazz Album	Nominated	
