= Woodville High School (South Australia) =

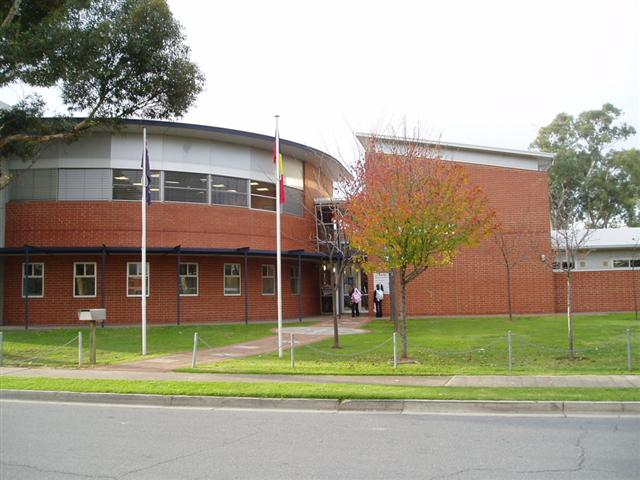
- Front view of Woodville High School on Actil Avenue

Location
- Woodville, South Australia; Australia; 34°52′S 138°32′E

Information
- Type: Public, secondary school
- Motto: Diversity. Creativity. Success.
- Established: 1915
- Principal: Anna Mirasgentis
- Enrollment: approximately 1,200 (from 70 backgrounds)
- Houses: Jupiter, Mercury, Neptune, Sirius
- Colours: French Navy & White (Secondary) Gold & Blue
- Website: woodvillehigh.sa.edu.au

Woodville High School is a secondary school in Woodville, a north western suburb of Adelaide, South Australia. It was opened in 1915.

The school provides music, performing and visual arts and sporting programs and has achieved success in these activities, with students winning Gold, Silver and Bronze placings in the Generations in Jazz competition held annually in Mount Gambier. In 2007, the Stage Band's saxophone section was deemed the best of the Generations in Jazz competition, which won them a small cash prize and a trophy which is displayed amongst the many others. The school's Music Center is also known for the variety of curriculum options with possible international outcomes in areas including: performance, sound engineering and composition. However, these curriculum options are largely based on Jazz or modern musical theory.

It is one of four Special Interest Music Centres, with those at Brighton Secondary School and Marryatville High School set up 1976, Woodville High School in 1977 and Playford International College (then "Fremont High School") in 1978 covering four distinct geographical areas of Adelaide.

The school participates in a variety of activities including the Vietnamese Moon Festival, Glendi, Dozynki and Carnevale.

The school has also won the Rock Eisteddfod Challenge, in 2007.

== Notable alumni ==
- Bruce Abernethy, Australian rules player, Port Adelaide and Adelaide
- Greg Anderson, Australian rules player, Port Adelaide, Essendon and Adelaide Football Club
- Mario Andreacchio, movie producer/director
- Justice Terry Connolly, Supreme Court, Australian Capital Territory
- Bryan Dawe, political satirist, writer, actor
- Bruce Dooland, Australian Test cricketer
- Eric Freeman, Australian Test cricketer
- Tim Ginever, Australian rules player
- Robert Haigh, Olympian hockey 4 times, Silver medalist, Australian hockey coach
- Neil Hawke, Australian Test cricketer, Australian Rules footballer
- Rob Kelvin, newsreader
- David Kemp, Australian plant geneticist and parasitologist (1945–2013)
- Bruce McAvaney, sports broadcaster
- Geof Motley, Australian rules player
- Charlie Perkins, Australian soccer player, indigenous political activist
- Mark Peters, Australian baseball player, Sporting Administrator
- Michelangelo Rucci, journalist
- Bob Simunsen, Australian Rules footballer, Interstate cricketer
- Jan Stirling, Australian basketball player and coach
- Tim Wall, Australian Test cricketer
