= Tony Gould (musician) =

Australian musician

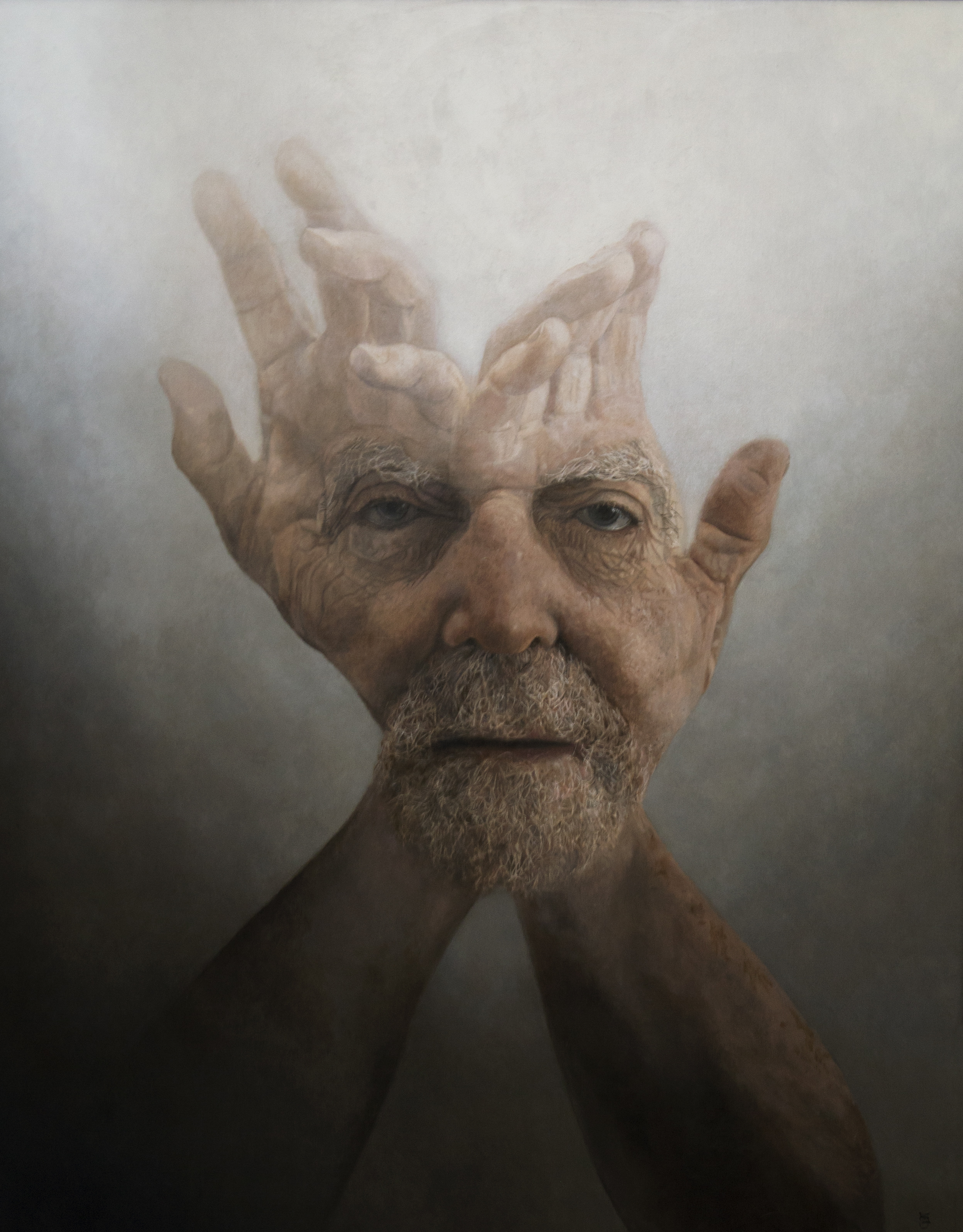
Portrait of Gould by Jaq Grantford

Tony Gould AM is an Australian jazz musician, pianist, composer, and educator.

Gould's many recordings and performances reveal his harmonic view of music and his love of music from both African-American and European jazz traditions, as well as the classical works of Bach, Mahler, Stravinsky, and Messiaen.

== Discography ==
=== Albums ===
List of albums, with selected details
Title	Details
Tony Gould Solo	Released: 1974; Format: LP; Label: Larrikin
Tony Gould (with Brian Brown & Murray Wall )	Released: 1978; Format: LP; Label: Jazznote (JNLP 021)
Gould Plays Gould (With John Sangster, Ray Martin and The Pro Musica Strings)	Released: 1979; Format: LP; Label: Move (MC3021)
Best of Friends	Released: 1984; Format: LP; Label: Move (MC3046)
Spirit of the Rainbow (with Brian Brown)	Released: 1990; Format: CD; Label: Move (3085)
Lirik (with Ben Robertson & Steve Heather)	Released: 1993; Format: CD; Label: Newmarket Music (NEW1035.2)
Chronicle: Orchestral Music of Tony Gould	Released: 1998; Format: CD; Label: Move (3146)
A Tin Roof for the Rain	Released: 1998; Format: CD; Label: Larrikin (LRF507)
River Story (with Peter Petrucci)	Released: 1999; Format: CD; Label: Move (3221)
From Within (with Peter Petrucci)	Released: 2002; Format: CD; Label: Move (3256)
Tomorrow, Just You Wait and See (with Emma Gilmartin)	Released: 2002; Format: CD; Label: Move (3266)
At the End of the Day	Released: 2005; Format: CD; Label: ABC Jazz (038 0672)
In Memoriam (with David Ward-Steinman)	Released: 2007; Format: CD; Label: Move (MD3311)
Under the Tall Trees (with Imogen Manins & David Jones)	Released: 2008; Format: CD, Digital; Label: ABC Classics (ABC 476 6452)
Hush Collection Volume 9: Is it Spring Yet?	Released: 2009; Format: CD; Label: Hush Music Foundation (HUSH 009)
Here (with Rob Burke)	Released: 2009; Format: CD, Digital; Label: Jazzhead (HEAD098)
Home (with Emma Gilmartin)	Released: 2010; Format: CD, Digital; Label: Move (MD 3343)
The Lucky Ones	Released: 2010; Format: CD, Digital; Label: Move (MD 3344)
The Cello & The Mockingbird (with Imogen Manins & David Jones)	Released: 2011; Format: CD, Digital; Label: Move (MD 3353)
Live At Bennetts Lane (with Robert Burke, Tony Floyd & Nick Haywood)	Released: 2011; Format: CD, Digital; Label: JazzHead (HEAD142)
The Journey Home (with Peter Petrucci)	Released: 2012; Format: CD, Digital; Label: Which Way Music (WWM016)
Such a Sky (with Imogen Manins)	Released: 2013; Format: CD, Digital; Label: Move (MD 3364)
The Hunters and Pointers (with Graeme Lyall John Hoffman & Ben Robertson)	Released: 2013; Format: CD, Digital
The Monash Sessions (with Mike Nock)	Released: 2015; Format: CD, Digital; Label: Jazzhead (HEAD218)
Little Did They Know (with Angela Davis & Sam Anning )	Released: 2019; Format: Digital; Label: ABC Jazz

== Bibliography ==
- Essays on Music and Musicians in Australia
- The Art of Musical Improvisation: Thoughts and Ideas

== Awards and nominations ==
=== ARIA Music Awards ===
The ARIA Music Awards is an annual awards ceremony that recognises excellence, innovation, and achievement across all genres of Australian music. They commenced in 1987.

Year	Nominee / work	Award	Result	Ref.
2014	The Hunters & Pointers (with Graeme Lyall John Hoffman & Ben Robertson)	Best Jazz Album	Nominated	

=== Australian Classical Music Awards ===
Year	Nominee / work	Award	Result	Ref.
2005	Tony Gould	Classical Music Award for "Outstanding Contribution to Australian Music in Education"	Nominated	
2009	"The River Meets the Sea" by Imogen Manins, Tony Gould, David Jones from Under the Tall Trees	Instrumental Work of the Year	Won	

=== Australian Council for Arts ===
Year	Nominee / work	Award	Result	Ref.
2005	Tony Gould	Hall of Fame	inducted	

=== Australian Jazz Bell Awards ===
Year	Nominee / work	Award	Result	Ref.
2011	Tony Gould	Hall of Fame	inducted	

=== Don Banks Music Award ===
The Don Banks Music Award was established in 1984 to publicly honour a senior artist of high distinction who has made an outstanding and sustained contribution to music in Australia. It was founded by the Australia Council in honour of Don Banks, Australian composer, performer and the first chair of its music board.

Year	Nominee / work	Award	Result
2009	Tony Gould	Don Banks Music Award	awarded

=== Music Victoria Awards ===
The Music Victoria Awards are an annual awards night celebrating Victorian music. They commenced in 2006.

Year	Nominee / work	Award	Result	Ref.
Music Victoria Awards of 2016	Monash Sessions (with Mike Nock)	Best Jazz Album	Nominated	
