= Viewbank =

- Suburb
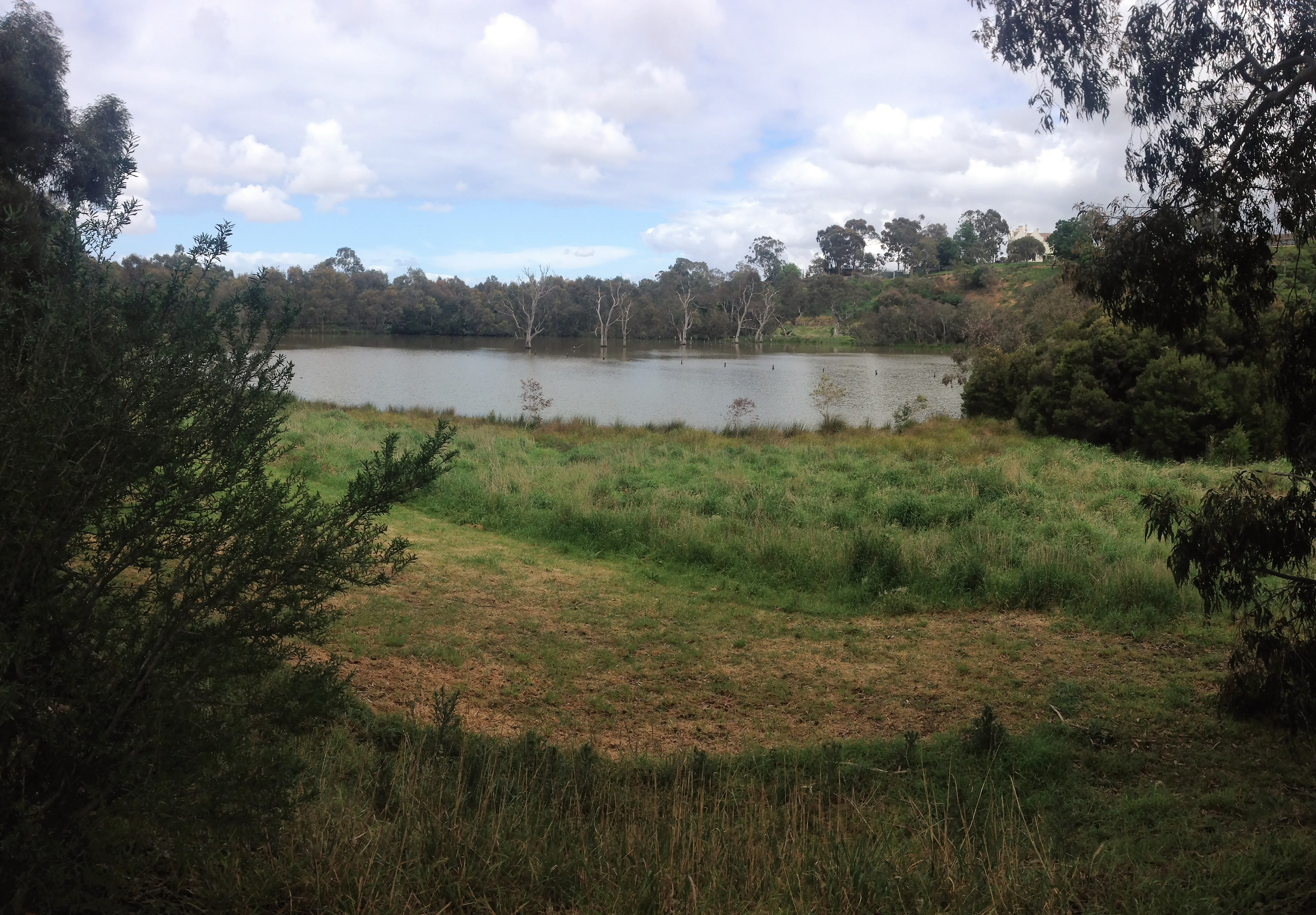
- Banyule Flats Reserve, Viewbank

- Interactive map of Viewbank
- Coordinates: 37.731°S 145.100°E
- Country: Australia
- State: Victoria
- City: Melbourne
- LGA: City of Banyule
- Location: 14 km (8.7 mi) from Melbourne

Government
  - State electorate: Ivanhoe
  - Federal division: Jagajaga

Area
  - Total: 4.5 km^{2} (1.7 sq mi)

Population
  - Total: 7,030 (2021 census)
  - Density: 1,562/km^{2} (4,050/sq mi)
- Postcode: 3084
Suburbs around Viewbank
	Yallambie
Rosanna	Viewbank	Lower Plenty
Heidelberg	Eaglemont

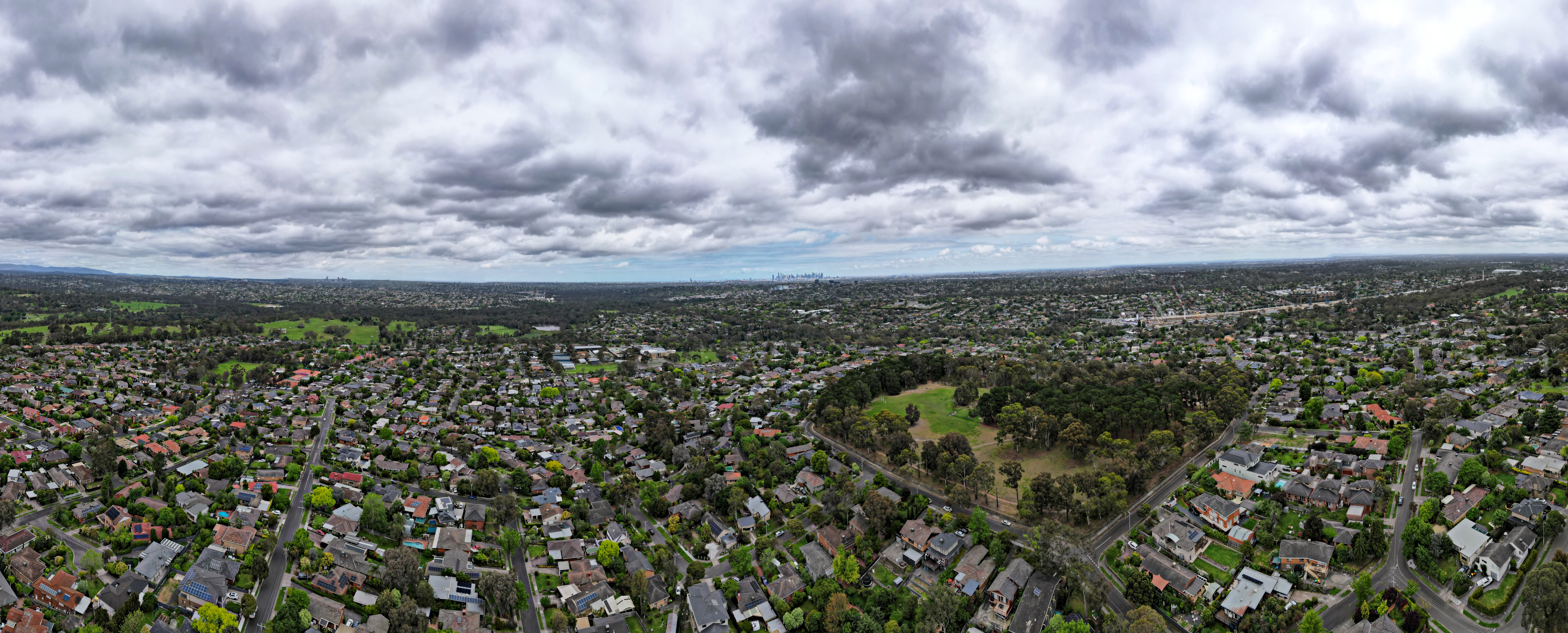
Viewbank aerial panorama facing Melbourne. October 2024.

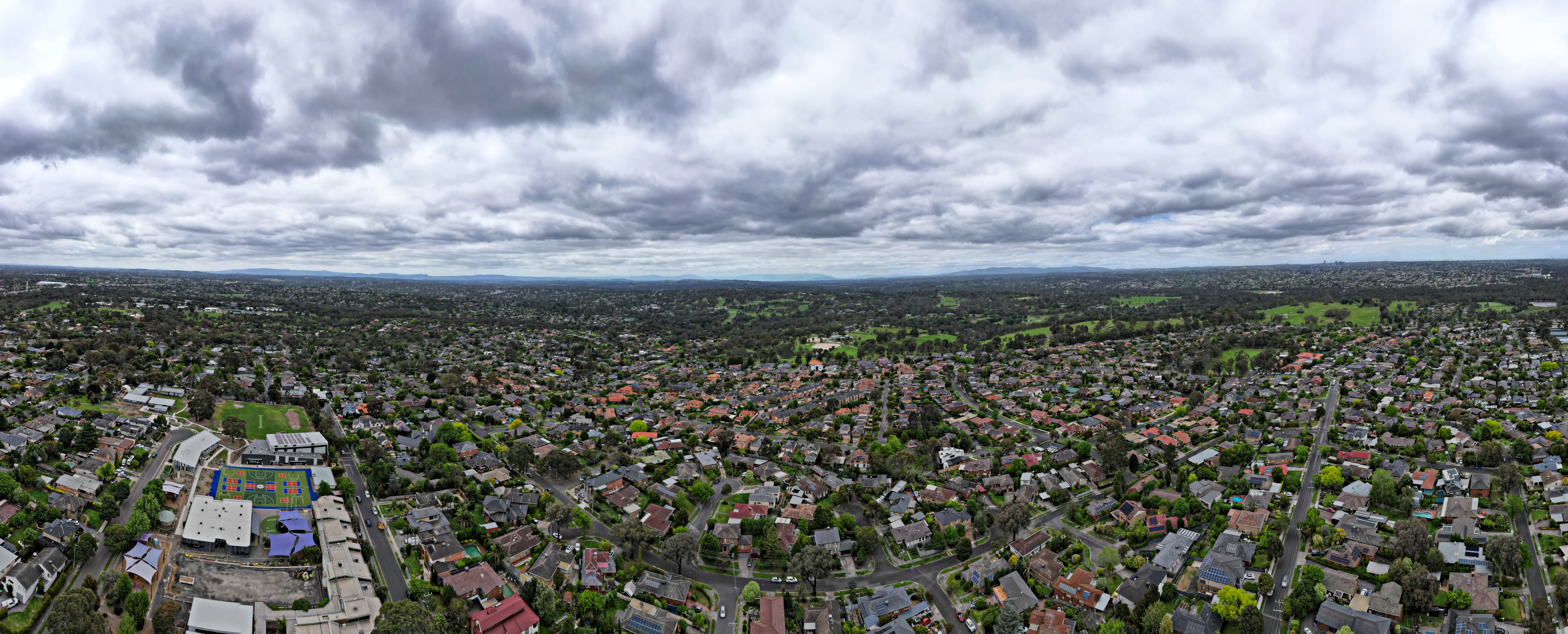
Viewbank aerial panorama facing east to the Dandenong Ranges. October 2024.

Viewbank is a suburb of Melbourne, Victoria, Australia, 14 km north-east of Melbourne's Central Business District, located within the City of Banyule local government area. Viewbank recorded a population of 7,030 at the 2021 census. The area now known as Viewbank is on the traditional lands of the Wurundjeri people. The Birrarung (Yarra River) and large tracts of the Yarra Valley Parkland run along one border of the suburb. The Plenty River forms Viewbank's eastern boundary, whilst its northern boundary is defined by Lower Plenty Road (a main road linking Heidelberg and Eltham). Although mainly a residential area, there is a small commercial strip on Martins Lane adjacent to Viewbank Primary School.

== History ==
=== Traditional ownership ===
The traditional owners of the land where Viewbank is are the Wurundjeri. Settlement and dispossession of the Wurundjeri lands began soon after a ceremony in which Wurundjeri leaders conducted a tanderrum ceremony, whose function was to allow outsiders temporary access to the resources of clan lands.

=== Viewbank homestead ===
The Viewbank homestead is a former homestead and archaeological site, located at 290 Banyule Road, that was added to the Victorian Heritage Register on 11 December 1997 in recognition of its historic, archaeological, aesthetic, and social significance.

Situated on the traditional lands of the Wurundjeri people, the area was settled by Edward Willis in 1837. James Williamson, a grazier, built a weatherboard homestead on the site now known as the Viewbank homestead in 1839, as part of a large 1830s pastoral run located at the confluence of the Yarra and Plenty rivers. Williamson named the estate 'Viewbank', after a property in Scotland. In 1842, Viewbank, comprising 78 hectares (192 acres), was acquired by Dr Robert Martin, a wealthy squatter, and his wife, Lucy. In 1850, Martin constructed a large twelve-room single-storey brick homestead on the site, designed by John Gill in a Victorian style. Occupied by the Martin family until 1874, the property was subsequently leased to various tenants and eventually fell into disrepair by the early 1920s; and the homestead was demolished in c. 1923. The estate was owned by the Bartram family who, from 1922 to 1974, operated the property as a dairy farm. Remnants of Viewbank's farming past can be seen from the historic silos still standing on Banyule Road.

Between 1996 and 1999, Heritage Victoria conducted excavations at the site with the help of archaeologists from University of Melbourne, La Trobe University and Flinders University with more than 140 archaeology students and members of the community. Stone foundations of the house with remnants of hand-made brick walls, fireplaces and other features were uncovered. Artefacts including toys, game tokens, thimbles and pins were found. Articles of affluence were also found in the form of a network of servant's bells, fragments of marble fireplaces and decorated plaster cornices were also uncovered.

=== Other history ===
Mollison Lodge at 32 Old Lower Plenty Road was built in 1916. It is considered a good example of the Federation Bungalow style, and is enhanced by its mature garden setting. Few pastoral or agricultural buildings survive from the early 20th century, with Mollison Lodge being one of the important exceptions. There were many rural allotments along the Yarra River, of which the house at 7 Walker Court appears to be an example, making it of local historical significance. The building is one of the few houses dating from the 19th century remaining in the area, and appears in an early painting. The area was primarily developed around the 1960s. The Viewbank Post Office opened on 1 October 1962 and was renamed Banyule in 1969. Several new housing developments were built during the 1990s and 2000s, including the end of Martins Lane, Winston Hills and Eagle View (on Casey Crescent).

Located near The Silo, is the Flécher Cottage, named in honour of Fletcher Brown.

== Facilities ==
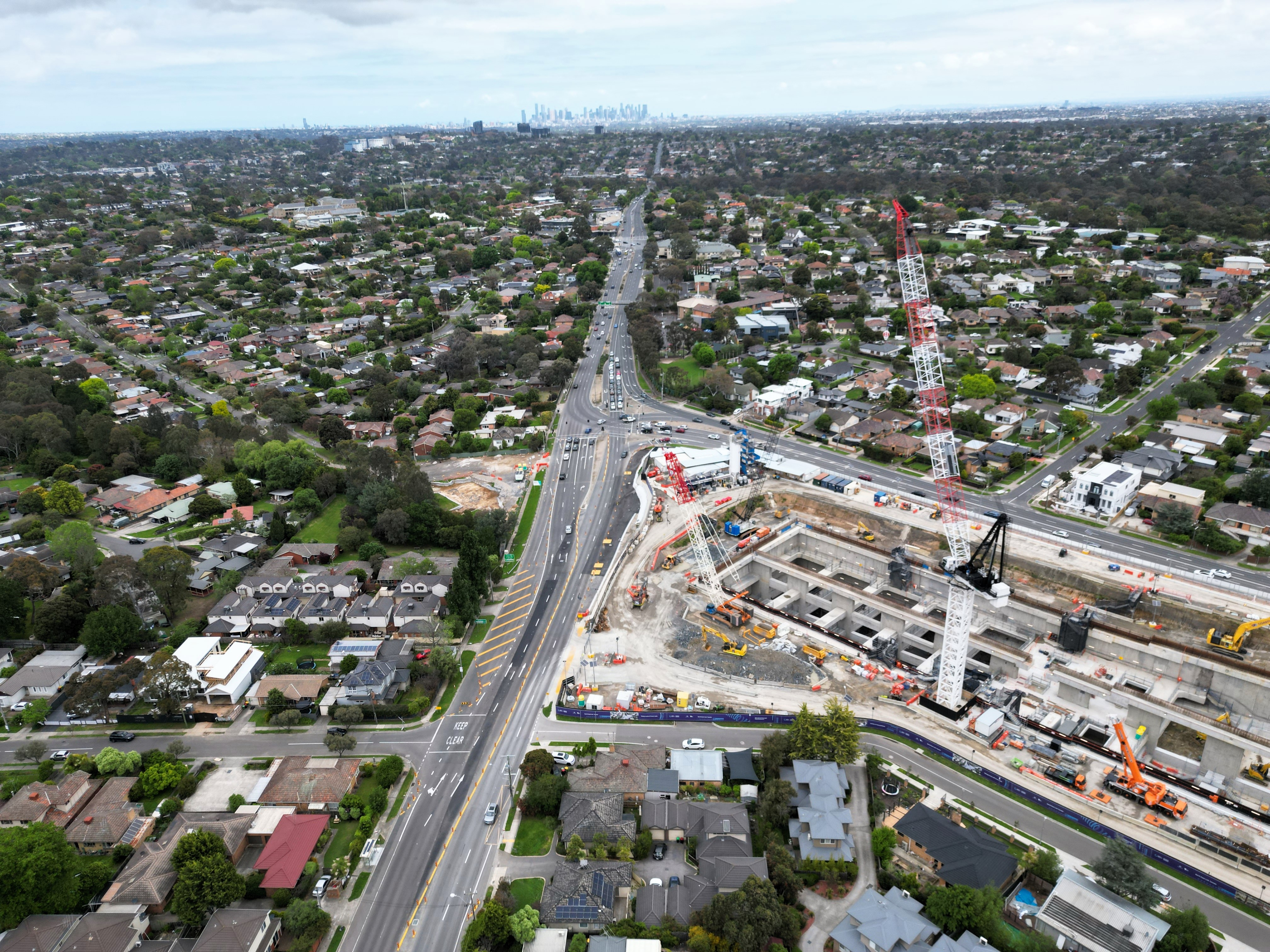
Northeast link at Viewbank facing the Melbourne skyline. October 2024.

There are very few facilities in Viewbank. The nearest libraries are at Rosanna and Eltham. The nearest pools are in Ivanhoe, Eltham and Heidelberg - all about a 15 to 20 minute drive away. The closest train station, Rosanna Station, is a 10-minute drive away with limited parking or a 40-minute walk. There are no cafes or places to dine in Viewbank.

=== Parks and wetlands ===
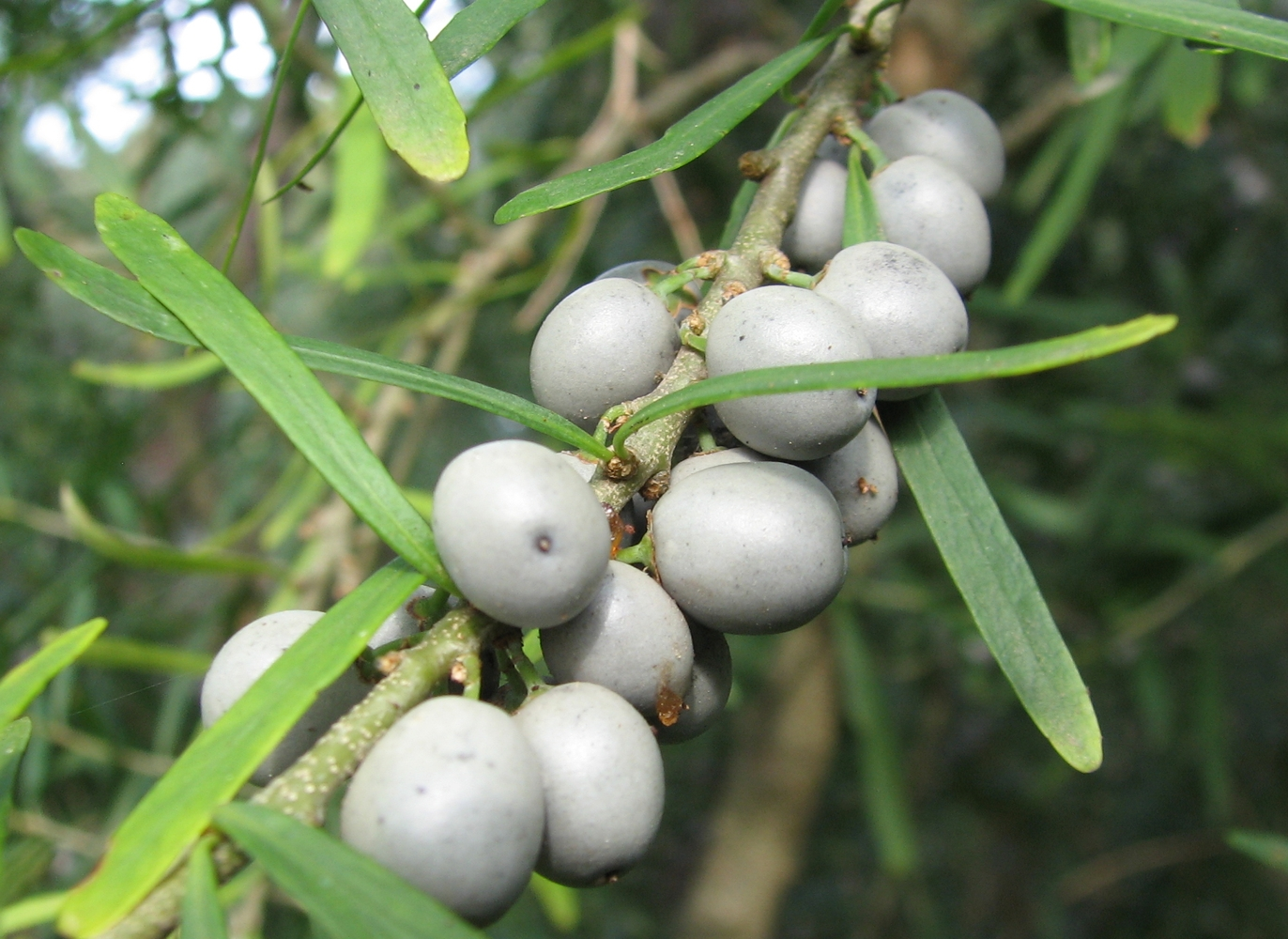
Melicytus dentatus berries, Banyule Flats Reserve, Viewbank

- Banyule Flats Reserve encompasses a large wetland of over 46 acres and is considered the largest grassy woodland in inner Melbourne.
- Castleton Park
- Price Park
- Viewbank Reserve

== Education ==
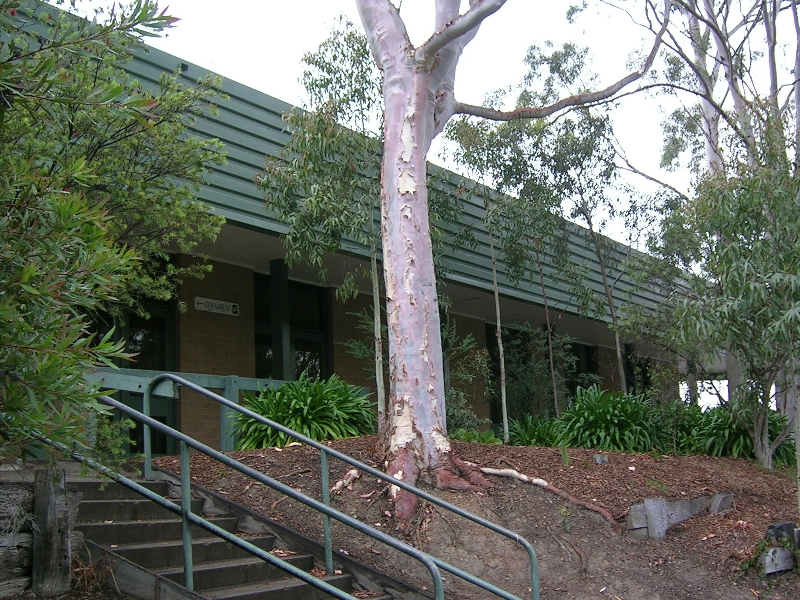
Viewbank College

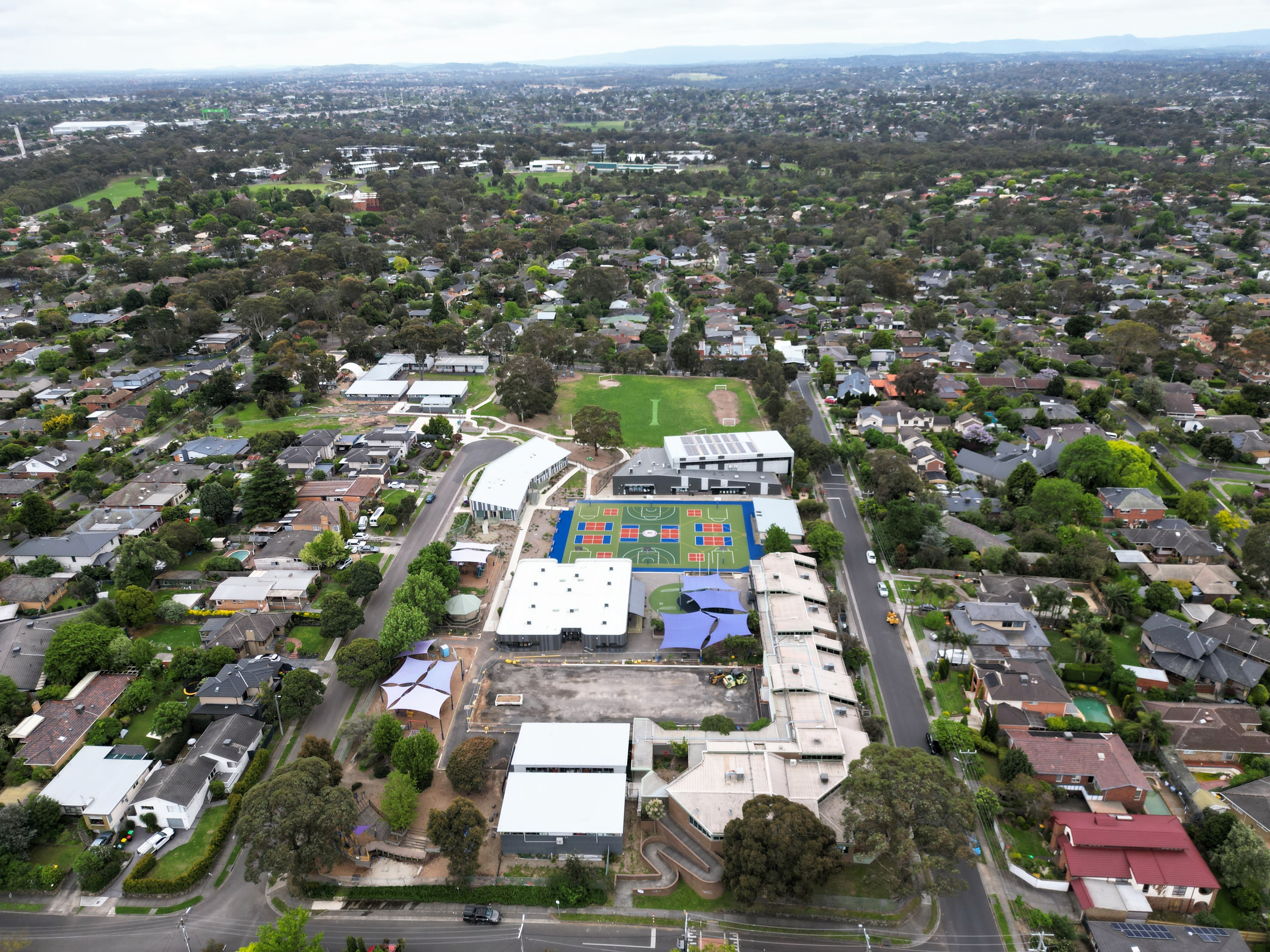
Viewbank Primary School. October 2024.

- Viewbank Primary School, located in Nevin Parade, Rosanna East, opened in 1966 with a staff of six and an enrolment of 97 pupils ranging from toddlers to Grade 6. It was not until 1968, when the enrolment rose to 285 pupils, that the school was officially opened. By this time extensive works had taken place on the 2-hectare (5.8-acre) property including sealed areas, drainage, reticulation of water, concrete paths and garden beds with concrete edging.
- Viewbank College, established in 1994 through the merger of Rosanna East High School with Banyule High School

== Climate ==
The Viewbank area has an Oceanic climate (Köppen climate classification Cfb). Out of all official weather stations in the Melbourne area, Viewbank records the highest annual average maximum temperatures; owing to its location just north of the Yarra Valley Parklands and Melbourne's densely populated eastern suburbs, resulting in a reduction of the cool southerly airflow that is common in the Melbourne area on most days. The temperature difference between Viewbank and central areas of Melbourne is more pronounced during the warmer months (Viewbank is marginally cooler during the winter months). In the warmer months, Viewbank can occasionally be as much as 10 degrees warmer than Melbourne Olympic Park (Melbourne's official weather station) during daylight hours, despite being only 14 km away.

Climate data for Viewbank (1999–2022); 66 m AMSL; 145.10' 37.74 °S,
Month	Jan	Feb	Mar	Apr	May	Jun	Jul	Aug	Sep	Oct	Nov	Dec	Year
Record high °C (°F)	44.8 (112.6)	46.7 (116.1)	39.9 (103.8)	34.5 (94.1)	27.5 (81.5)	23.5 (74.3)	22.1 (71.8)	23.7 (74.7)	31.0 (87.8)	36.0 (96.8)	41.5 (106.7)	43.6 (110.5)	46.7 (116.1)
Mean daily maximum °C (°F)	28.2 (82.8)	27.6 (81.7)	25.5 (77.9)	21.3 (70.3)	17.2 (63.0)	14.4 (57.9)	14.0 (57.2)	15.3 (59.5)	17.8 (64.0)	20.5 (68.9)	23.9 (75.0)	25.9 (78.6)	21.0 (69.8)
Mean daily minimum °C (°F)	14.7 (58.5)	14.5 (58.1)	12.9 (55.2)	10.2 (50.4)	7.8 (46.0)	6.1 (43.0)	5.9 (42.6)	6.4 (43.5)	7.8 (46.0)	9.0 (48.2)	11.4 (52.5)	12.8 (55.0)	10.0 (50.0)
Record low °C (°F)	5.2 (41.4)	7.2 (45.0)	2.8 (37.0)	−0.1 (31.8)	−0.9 (30.4)	−1.9 (28.6)	−2.8 (27.0)	−2.7 (27.1)	−0.5 (31.1)	0.7 (33.3)	3.7 (38.7)	4.9 (40.8)	−2.8 (27.0)
Average precipitation mm (inches)	45.5 (1.79)	43.7 (1.72)	43.6 (1.72)	62.0 (2.44)	53.8 (2.12)	55.8 (2.20)	47.1 (1.85)	56.4 (2.22)	55.9 (2.20)	65.1 (2.56)	73.8 (2.91)	65.9 (2.59)	668.6 (26.32)
Average precipitation days (≥ 1.0 mm)	5.5	4.8	5.7	7.2	8.7	9.5	10.0	11.0	9.0	9.4	8.2	7.0	96.0
Source: Australian Bureau of Meteorology; Viewbank

== See also ==
- City of Heidelberg – Viewbank was previously within this former local government area.
