= Melbourne International Jazz Festival =

Australian music Festival

- Melbourne International Jazz Festival logo (2024)
- Genre: Jazz
- Frequency: Annually
- Location: Melbourne
- Years active: 1998–2019, 2021–
- Inaugurated: 10–26 Jan 1998
- Most recent: 18–27 Oct 2024
- Website: www.melbournejazz.com

The Melbourne International Jazz Festival is an annual jazz music festival first held in Melbourne, Australia, in 1998. The festival takes place in concert halls, arts venues, jazz clubs and throughout the streets of Melbourne.

== History ==
The Melbourne International Jazz Festival had its origins as the Marvellous Melbourne Jazz Festival, first held in January 1997 by former co-organiser of the Montsalvat International Jazz Festival Mal Harrop. The 1997 festival was backed financially by Tourism Victoria, Melbourne Parks and Waterways, the City of Melbourne, and The Herald and Weekly Times. Featuring a mix of international and local acts, the festival was mostly free events held across the city of Melbourne. It was considered a success, and announced they would return the following year, with former MP Graeme Weideman appointed as chairman, and Ross Anderson appointed musical director.

By late 1997, it was announced the Marvellous Melbourne Jazz Festival organisers had been replaced, and the festival would be renamed The Melbourne International Jazz Festival when it returned in 1998, with jazz critic and artistic director for the Wangaratta Festival of Jazz Adrian Jackson replacing Anderson as festival director. The new direction was considered "a new beginning" by organisers, with the 1998 festival advertised as the inaugural Melbourne International Jazz Festival.

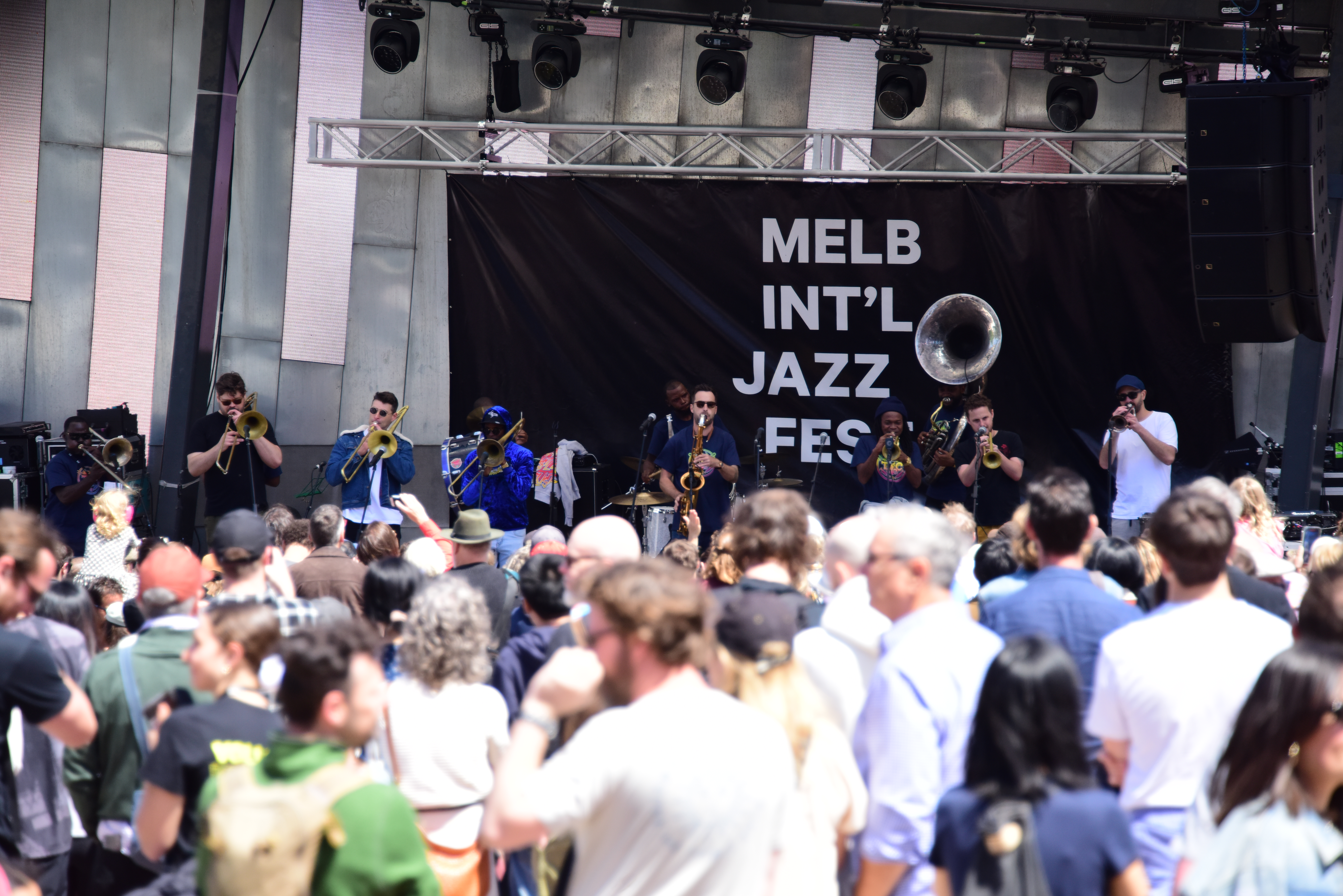
Melbourne International Jazz Festival 2024

The festival continued until 2002, when it was cancelled only weeks before the program was due for announcement, after City of Melbourne withdrew funding. Some events still went ahead thanks to support from venues such as Bennetts Lane Jazz Club, and, following protests from the local jazz community, the festival returned in 2003 with funding from City of Melbourne and City of Stonnington.

There was no festival in 2006 due to the Commonwealth Games held in Melbourne that year, and the festival was again cancelled in 2020 due to the COVID-19 pandemic in Australia. In its place, on the last Saturday of May, June and July 2020, the Festival presented the free 'These Digital Times', its first digital on-line live-streamed festival series.

Adrian Jackson stepped down as artistic director after the 2004 festival, and was replaced by long-running director of the Umbria Jazz Festival in Italy, Carlo Pagnotta. In response to the partnership between the Melbourne and Umbira festivals, Australian musicians formed the Melbourne Jazz Fringe Festival. At the end of 2006, the partnership between the Melbourne and Umbira festivals ended, and the Melbourne International Jazz Festival committed to put their focus back onto Melbourne musicians. The 2007 festival was directed by former festival chairman Albert Dadon, who was succeeded by Michael Tortoni in 2009.

Since its beginning, the festival has featured a mix of Australian and international jazz musicians, with an underlying objective to raise the profile of Melbourne's jazz scene. Artists have included international musicians Herbie Hancock, Marcus Miller, Chaka Khan, and Lalah Hathaway. Local acts have included Sam Anning, Emma Donovan and The Putbacks, Mike Nock, Kate Ceberano, and Flora Carbo.

== Venues ==
The 2024 festival was held across 25 venues, including:

- The JazzLab
- Federation Square
- 170 Russell
- Arts Centre Melbourne
- Melbourne Recital Centre
- ACMI
- Howler
- Malvern Town Hall
- PBS 106.7FM Studios
- Arden Station
- Grazeland
- Monash University
- ArtPlay
- Kindred Bandroom
- Northside Records
- Australian Jazz Museum
- Red Stair Amphitheatre (Southbank)
- Sidney Myer Music Bowl
- St James
- The Toff in Town
- Wax Music Lounge
