= Viewbank College =

Location
- Warren Road; Viewbank, Victoria, 3084; Australia

Information
- School type: Public, co-educational, secondary, day school
- Motto: Caring for Excellence
- Established: 1994
- Status: Open
- Principal: Ian Van Schie
- Staff: 163 (as of 2022)
- Teaching staff: 127 (as of 2022)
- Years offered: 7–12
- Enrolment: 1470 (as of 2022)
- Houses: Stella, Hydra, Ignis, Terra
- Colours: Navy blue, maroon, and gold
- Newspaper: Viewbank College Newsletter
- Yearbook: Phoenix
- Communities served: Banyule City Council
- Website: viewbank.vic.edu.au
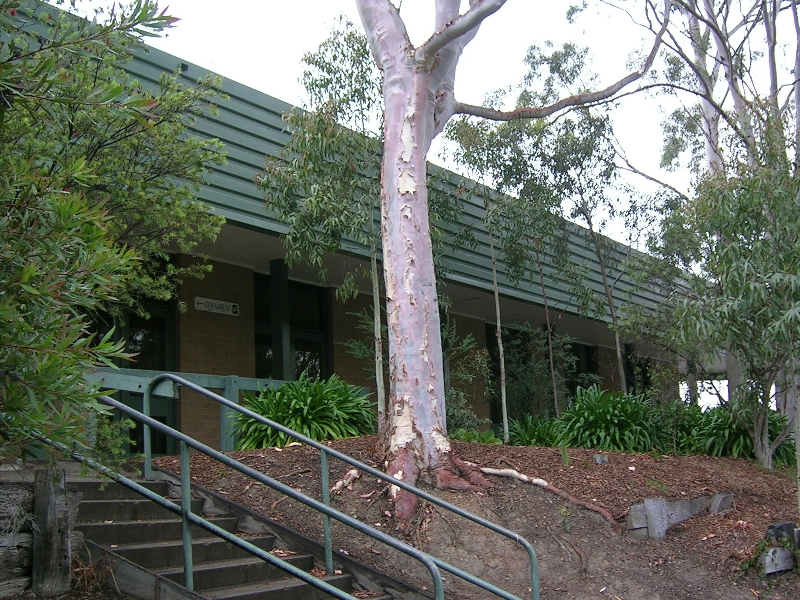
- The administration building at Viewbank College

Viewbank College is a public secondary school located in the north eastern suburb of Viewbank, in Melbourne, Australia.

== History ==
Viewbank College was founded on the site of Rosanna East High School in 1994, the result of a merger between it and Rosanna.

The two original schools serviced the surrounding area, predominantly enrolling students situated in the City of Heidelberg (now known as the City of Banyule). Banyule High School commenced in 1961 and by 1970 its student population had swelled to over 900. As a result, Rosanna East High School was started in 1970 to reduce the pressure on Banyule High School. It began operating in the grounds of Rosanna Golf Links Primary School but the following year, with the completion of the construction of new buildings at the Warren Road site, the school moved to its permanent location in Viewbank. With decreasing enrolments in both schools, in 1993 talks were held in consideration of a merger. By January 1994, Viewbank College as a school had begun. On 6 November 1996, an official opening was conducted by the Honourable Richard McGarvie, the Governor of Victoria at the time.

The school continues to operate from the Warren Road site and retains ownership over the Banyule Theatre (previously part of Banyule High School) with the remaining land sold off for residential development. The school is predicted to have more than 2,000 students by 2022. The theatre is now used for teaching and performance.

In 2019, sketch Comedy group Aunty Donna filmed a 16-part webseries entitled Glennridge Secondary College at Viewbank College, with funding and support from Screen Australia. It was released on YouTube weekly from 20 February 2019.

During the 2025 Generations in Jazz festival, Viewbank College's Ellington Band performed in Division One and placed third in Australia (first in Victoria and highest performing public school in Australia). Notably, Jun Lee was awarded the Division One Superband Trumpet 1 part as a result of performing well in Gordon Goodwin's Kidding on the Square. Patrick Mehan and Patrick Broadbent's Billy Joel Medley arrangement contributed to the success that Ellington Band saw.

Following Sharon Grime's retirement at the end of 2025, the college is currently led by acting principal Ian Van Schie.

== Programs and co-curricular activities ==
Gifted students who are identified as "capable, committed, and enthusiastic" can enroll in the Viewbank College Acceleration and Enhancement (AE) Program. The study structure is non-repetitive, covers traditional curriculum over a shorter period of time, promotes more abstract, complex thought, and gives students opportunities to work independently.

The College provides the Social & Emotional Pathways Program (SEP), which ensures that "each Year level has at least one period a week with their SEP teach to build stronger connections to their peers."

There are additional programs and co-curricular activities such as the Year 7 Transition Program, debating, music, performing arts, and sport. The college has various student leadership groups, clubs, and travel opportunities.

The College has a school council and two parent-teacher-student bodies—Friends of Performing Arts (FOPA) and Friends of STEAM (FOSTEAM)—which allow for community involvement. The College also has an association with Narita Kokusai High School in Japan.

== Performing arts ==
In recent years Viewbank College has become renowned in the local area for their Musical Productions. Each year over 120 students are involved in all aspects of the shows, including but not limited to Cast, Stage Crew, Audio Crew, Lighting Crew, Art Crew, Orchestra, Makeup Crew and Front of House. The shows are generally "Big Broadway Musicals" attracting over 1400 ticket sales over 6 shows. Productions are held in July/August each year and were held at the college's Banyule Theatre until 2017.

In the 2015–16 State Budget, $11.5 million was allocated to the school to build a dedicated 400 seat Theatre and adjoining Performing Arts Facilities. Completion of the Arts Centre was in 2018. The project was managed by the Victorian School Building Authority. It now hosts the College Production each year as well as many more College events. The theater is also hired out regularly for external events.

Year	Production
1994	Man of La Mancha
1995	Sweeney Todd
1996	Son of Phantom
1997	The Pirates of Penzance
1998	Annie Get Your Gun
1999	Bye Bye Birdie
2000	Mid Summer Nights Dream
2001	Lola Montez
2002	The Scarlet Pimpernel
2003	Guys And Dolls
2004	Little Shop of Horrors
2005	Anything Goes
2006	Annie
2007	Crazy For You
2008	Grimm Tales
2009	Oliver
2010	Hot Mikado
2011	Oklahoma
2012	Hello Dolly
2013	How To Succeed in Business Without Really Trying
2014	Hairspray
2015	The Producers
2016	The Addams Family
2017	All Shook Up
2018	Singin' In The Rain
2019	Back To The 80's
2020	Grease (Cancelled due to COVID-19)
2021	Chicago (High School Edition)
2022	We Will Rock You
2023	Legally Blonde
2024	Seussical
2025	Mamma Mia!
2026	Heathers

Year	Middle School Production
2007	A Snow White Tale
2008	Charlie & The Chocolate Factory
2009	The Wizard Of Oz (Did Not Occur)
2010	Alice In Wonderland
2011	The Wind In The Willows
2012	Twinderella
2013	Rapunzel: A Twisted Tale
2014	Attack Of The Zombies
2015	Robin Hood
2016	Law and Order- Nursery Rhyme Unit
2017	Super Useless
2018	Space Play
2019	End Of The Line
2020	Program did not run due to COVID-19
2021	Viewbank Variety Show
2022	Game On
2023	Cola
2024	Once Upon a Crime
2025	Scriptocalypse Now
2026	Ground Floor

Viewbank College also offers an extensive musical education program featuring many instruments and also voice lessons. The school has a variety of ensembles led by musical staff, participating in many performances arranged by the school and also state programs. The students of these ensembles are required to participate in weekly rehearsals.

These ensembles include 3 string orchestras ordered by skill (Junior Strings, Viewbank Strings and Chamber Strings, formally known as Junior Strings, Intermediate Strings and Senior Strings). In the strings program students would progress to a higher ensemble every two years, sooner if exceptional performance is displayed; There are 3 Jazz bands named after famous Jazz musicians (arranged by progression: Hancock Band, Fitzgerald Band and Ellington Band); 3 concert bands (arranged by progression: Junior Band, Showtime Band, and Symphonic Band); 2 guitar ensembles (Intermediate Guitar Band and Senior Guitar Band); 3 choirs (Junior Choir, Viewbank Voices and Chamber Choir); and various other notable ensembles, along with a collection of student-arranged bands typically with 3-5 musicians.

The instruments taught by the program covers a variety of instrument types like woodwind, string, percussion and brass, including: violin, viola, cello, double bass, acoustic guitar, bass guitar, electric guitar, percussion, keyboard, trumpet, saxophone (soprano, alto, tenor, baritone), trombone, French horn, euphonium, tuba, flute, clarinet(and bass clarinet), and oboe. As aforementioned, singing is also educated.

Some of the annually reoccurring musical performances/festivals include: Autumn Music Festival (school arrangement & all ensembles), Jazz Night (regional arrangement & only Jazz bands), Victorian Schools Music Festival (government arrangement & all ensembles, multiple times a year depending on ensemble), String Soiree (school arrangement & only string ensembles and players), and the Gala & Showcase Concerts (school arrangement & all ensembles). As of 2026 the Gala & Showcase Concerts have been moved to when the Autumn Music Festival was previously held. They have also been appropriately renamed to the "Autumn Gala" and "Autumn Showcase" respectively. It is yet to be seen what is happening with the former Autumn Festival.

== Incidents ==
In 2007, two students, one from Macleod College and the other from Greensborough Secondary College, burnt down a section of the junior school lockers and were caught after investigation by the police.

== Notable alumni ==
- Ben Mendelsohn, actor
- Anthony Carbines, politician
- Michael Hurley, AFL player
- Brent Stanton, AFL player
- Aidan Corr, AFL player
- Holly Ridewood, AFLW player
- Broden Kelly, Aunty Donna comedian
- Thomas Zahariou (né Armstrong), Aunty Donna producer and musician
- Jade Ingvarson-Favretto, member of Australian pop band Blusher

== See also ==
- List of schools in Victoria
