= Flora Carbo =

Australian jazz musician

- Genres: Jazz
- Occupation: Musician
- Instrument: Saxophone
- Website: https://floracarbo.com/

Flora Carbo is an Australian jazz musician based in Melbourne.

== Career ==
Flora Carbo began playing saxophone at the age of 12, and became interested in jazz after visiting the Wangaratta Festival of Jazz. She later completed a Bachelor of Music at the University of Melbourne.

With her band the Flora Carbo Trio, she released her debut album Erica in 2018, with Isaac Gunnoo and Maddison Carter. They performed at that year's Stonnington Jazz Festival.

In 2019 she attended the Banff Centre's Workshop in Jazz and Improvised Music in Canada where she met Australian musicians Audrey Powne, Tamara Murphy, and Kyrie Anderson. They recorded an album of improvised jazz which was released under the name Aura in 2021. The group later performed at that years Melbourne Jazz Festival.

Flora Carbo's debut solo album Voice was released at the beginning of 2020, and was to be followed by a European tour. This was cancelled due to the COVID-19 pandemic in Australia, but she was able to perform as part of a digital festival at that year's Melbourne Jazz Festival.

She released her EP Arthur's Walks in 2022, a collection of work inspired by walking. It was recorded at home and was her first self-produced music. The EP entered the Australian Independent Record Labels Association's charts, reaching #7 in their Independent Label Singles chart and #3 in the 100% Independent Singles chart.

Carbo was Melbourne Jazz Festival's 2022 Take Note Jazz Leader, their annual artist development and gender equity initiative. She received support in the development of a new work Ecosystem which was premiered at the festival opening night. In July 2026, she was Artist In Residence on ABC Jazz.

== Awards ==
- 2021 - Freedman Jazz Fellowship - Nominated
- 2019 - Australian Jazz Bell Awards - Finalist, Young Australian Jazz Artist of the Year
- 2019 - Freedman Jazz Fellowship - Nominated
- 2018 - Freedman Jazz Fellowship - Nominated
- 2017 - Generations In Jazz James Morrison Scholarship - Winner
- 2016 - National Jazz Awards - Finalist

== Discography ==
Albums

- 2018 - Erica (as Flora Carbo Trio)
- 2020 - Voice
- 2021 - Aura (as Aura)

EPs

- 2022 - Arthurs' Walks
