= St John's Grammar School =

Location
- Belair, Adelaide Hills, South Australia; Australia; 35°00′04″S 138°37′13″E

Information
- Type: Independent co-educational early learning, primary, and secondary day school
- Denomination: Anglican Church
- Established: 1958; 68 years ago
- Chairman: Naomi Lindermeyer
- Principal: Ben Manifold
- Staff: 240
- Years: Early learning to Year 12
- Enrolment: 1020
- Campus type: Suburban
- Colours: Maroon, blue and yellow
- Slogan: Learning to Soar
- Yearbook: The Eagle
- Affiliation: Junior School Heads Association of Australia; Sports Association for Adelaide Schools
- Website: www.stjohns.sa.edu.au

St John's Grammar School is an independent Anglican co-educational early learning, primary, and secondary day school located in Belair in the Adelaide Hills, about 12 kilometres (7.5 mi) south of the Adelaide city centre. It caters for students from early learning through to Year 12.

== Overview ==
St John's Grammar School was founded in 1958. It operates from three campuses; the Junior School is adjacent to Belair National Park and the Belair railway station, the Early Learning Centre is opposite the Junior School, and the Secondary School, setup in 1998, occupies the site of the former Retreat House and St Barnabas Theological College. The school offers a range of subjects to its students, who begin electing their courses from Year 8. St John's has traditionally had a strong emphasis on music, winning numerous awards in this area. (See South Australian Choral Eisteddfod for details). The school offers a range of co-curricular activities, including various sports like soccer volleyball netball and sailing, music, debating, future problem solving, Pedal Prix, Duke of Edinburgh, and school productions. In 2006, the school entered into a partnership with EFM Health Clubs to provide an on-site health and fitness studio for curriculum use.

== House system ==
St John's Grammar has a rich house life. Students from each house compete with each other every Friday in a range of sports and co-curricular activities. Points from the house activities go towards the House Shield. There are four houses named after pioneers of the Belair area. The school has a pastoral care system through which students are placed into one of these houses and encouraged to participate in house life. The houses are:

- Gooch (red)
- Halstead (green)
- Moffatt (yellow)
- Prince (blue)

== Campus ==
There are three campuses:

- Early Learning Campus (3–4 year olds)
- Junior Campus (Reception to Year 6)
- Secondary Campus (Years 7–12)

== Extracurricular activities ==
=== Music and arts ===
The secondary school stages a musical in the even years, with a cabaret in the odd years. The drama productions have included adaptions of well-known stories such as Little Shop of Horrors, Peter Pan and Charlie and the Chocolate Factory.

== Notable alumni ==
- Kassandra Clementi (2008) – actress
- Tiffany Cromwell (2005) – Australian cyclist
- Annette Edmondson (2009) – Australian Olympic cyclist and Olympic Bronze Medallist in Women's Omnium
- Alexander Edmondson – Australian Olympic cyclist
- Ben Nicholas – actor from Australian soap opera, Neighbours
- Sarah Snook – actress
- Morgan Yaeger – Australian basketball player

== See also ==
- List of Anglican schools in Australia
