= Tenison Woods College =

Location
- Shepherdson Road, Mount Gambier, Limestone Coast, South Australia; Australia; 37°49′47″S 140°45′17″E

Information
- Type: Independent co-educational secondary school
- Motto: Let Your Light Shine (from Matthew 5:16)
- Denomination: Roman Catholic
- Established: 2001; 25 years ago
- Principal: David Mezinec
- Staff: 150+
- Years: R–12
- Enrollment: 1,300+
- Colours: Blue and navy blue
- Website: tenison.adl.catholic.edu.au

Tenison Woods College is an Australian independent co-educational Roman Catholic secondary school in Mount Gambier, South Australia. It is named after the pioneer priest, scientist and educator Julian Tenison Woods in recognition of his contribution to Catholic education. It was established in 2001 as an R-12 Catholic college as a result of the efforts of the Parish of Mount Gambier, the Boards and community of Tenison College and St. Pauls Primary School. The school's motto is Let Your Light Shine (from Matthew 5:16) which is displayed on the school logo. Tenison Woods College has over 1,300 students and over 150 staff members.

== Development ==
Tenison Woods has continued improvement in academic, sporting and available facilities. The school has opened the Aston Fields, which includes a full-sized soccer field and a flexible learning centre, a multimillion-dollar double story expansion for the senior students & the gilap-wanga Learning community. Its sporting achievements include winning the year 10 South Australian State Girls Netball Final.

== Education ==
Tenison Woods has a high Tertiary Entrance Rank (TER) result. An average of 23% of students from 2007 to 2009 received a TER of 90 or higher, whilst an average of 45% received a TER of 80 or higher over the same period.

Tenison Woods is one of a few schools that has a system where from year 10, the student starts the next year level a few months earlier (for example, if the student is in year 11, the last semester/term of the year they go into year 12 ). This helps students prepare for year 12 examinations by giving them more study time.

Tension Woods College offers a course Generations in Jazz Academy. According to the school's website, the course contains an excellent balance of performance and academic units. It can be undertaken on a one-year, full-time basis. The course involves, Improvisation, Jazz Theory Aural Training, Jazz History, Large Ensemble and Business of Music.

== See also ==
- List of schools in South Australia
- Catholic education in Australia
