= Playford International College =

Coordinates: 34.7235°S 138.6665°E

Location
- Philip Highway; Elizabeth, South Australia

Information
- Type: Public
- Established: 1960
- Principal: Amanda Walsh
- Teaching staff: 110
- Website: playford.sa.edu.au

Playford International College (formerly known as Fremont-Elizabeth City High School) is a high school in Elizabeth, a northern suburb of Adelaide, South Australia. It is an amalgamation of three secondary schools in Elizabeth: Playford High School, Fremont High School, and Elizabeth City High School.

Playford offers general secondary education with elite programs in music. It is one among the four Special Interest Music Centres, with those at the then "Fremont High School" set up in 1978, Brighton Secondary School and Marryatville High Schools set up in 1976, and Woodville High School in 1977, covering four distinct geographical areas of Adelaide. It is also one of thirteen Engineering Pathways Schools in South Australia.

The name "Playford" was in recognition of Sir Thomas Playford, the state premier whose government established Elizabeth, a reference seen today in the name of the City of Playford which was formed by the amalgamation of Elizabeth and Munno Para.

== History ==
=== Elizabeth Girls Technical High School ===
The Elizabeth Girls Technical High School was established in Elizabeth East in 1960, providing for students beyond year 7, at a time when the minimum school leaving age was 14. It was renamed Playford High School around 1976 and changed from a girls-only to a co-ed school in 1976. In 1988, it amalgamated with Elizabeth High School. After which the Elizabeth East site was decommissioned.

=== Elizabeth Boys Technical High School ===
The Elizabeth Boys Technical High School was established in Elizabeth Park in 1960, providing for students beyond year 7. It was renamed Fremont High School after 1975, changed from a boys-only to a co-ed school in 1976, and then amalgamated with Elizabeth City High School in 1997. The Elizabeth Park site was decommissioned in 1997.

The name 'Fremont' was taken from Elizabeth's sister city in California, named after the American explorer John C. Frémont. The reference is also seen today in the name of Fremont Park, between Elizabeth Park and Elizabeth East. The City of Playford no longer maintains this relationship with Fremont, California.

=== Elizabeth High School ===
Elizabeth High School was established at the Philip Highway site in Elizabeth in 1961. It provided general education for students beyond year 7, and preparation for entry to tertiary education. It had a year 8 intake initially, but also a year 9 intake comprising students who had been bussed to Salisbury High School from Elizabeth as year 8 Students in 1960. For 1961 the school was housed completely in temporary classrooms, the new two wing block not occupied until 1962. With the growth of the suburbs, enrolment rapidly outgrew the permanent buildings in the north-eastern corner of the site. By the mid-1960s over half the school was housed in "temporary" buildings extending west. A third wing was added to the "permanent" buildings and enrolment continued to grow to over 2000 students in the latter half of the decade. Enrolment eventually declined with the maturing population of the city and the establishment of another high school in Elizabeth West closer to developing suburbs that had extended northwards into Munno Para.

=== Playford High School ===
In 1988, an amalgamation with Playford High School formed Elizabeth City High School, and the schools were combined at the Philip Highway site.

=== Fremont–Elizabeth City High School ===
In 1995, an amalgamation with Fremont High School formed Fremont-Elizabeth City High School at the Philip Highway site.

=== Playford International College ===
In 2016, Fremont–Elizabeth City High School renamed its name as 'Playford International College'. The state government provided $7 million over four years to build a centre for advanced technologies, maths, science, arts, multimedia, and refurbish classrooms. Upgrades were scheduled in 2016/17 and planned to be completed by 2019.

== Principals ==
- Bev Rogers (1996–2005)
- David Roberts (2005–2007)
- Peta Kourbelis (2007–2014)
- Rob Knight (2015–2019)
- Nick Zissopoulos (2020)
- Karen Bond (2021–2024)
- Amanda Walsh (2025–)
