= Ringwood Secondary College =

Location
- Ringwood, Victoria; Australia; 37°48′59″S 145°14′23″E

Information
- Type: Public
- Motto: Culture and Service
- Established: 1954
- Principal: Rosina Fotia
- Enrolment: 1,418
- Campus: Suburban
- Colours: Maroon & green
- Website: ringwoodsc.vic.edu.au

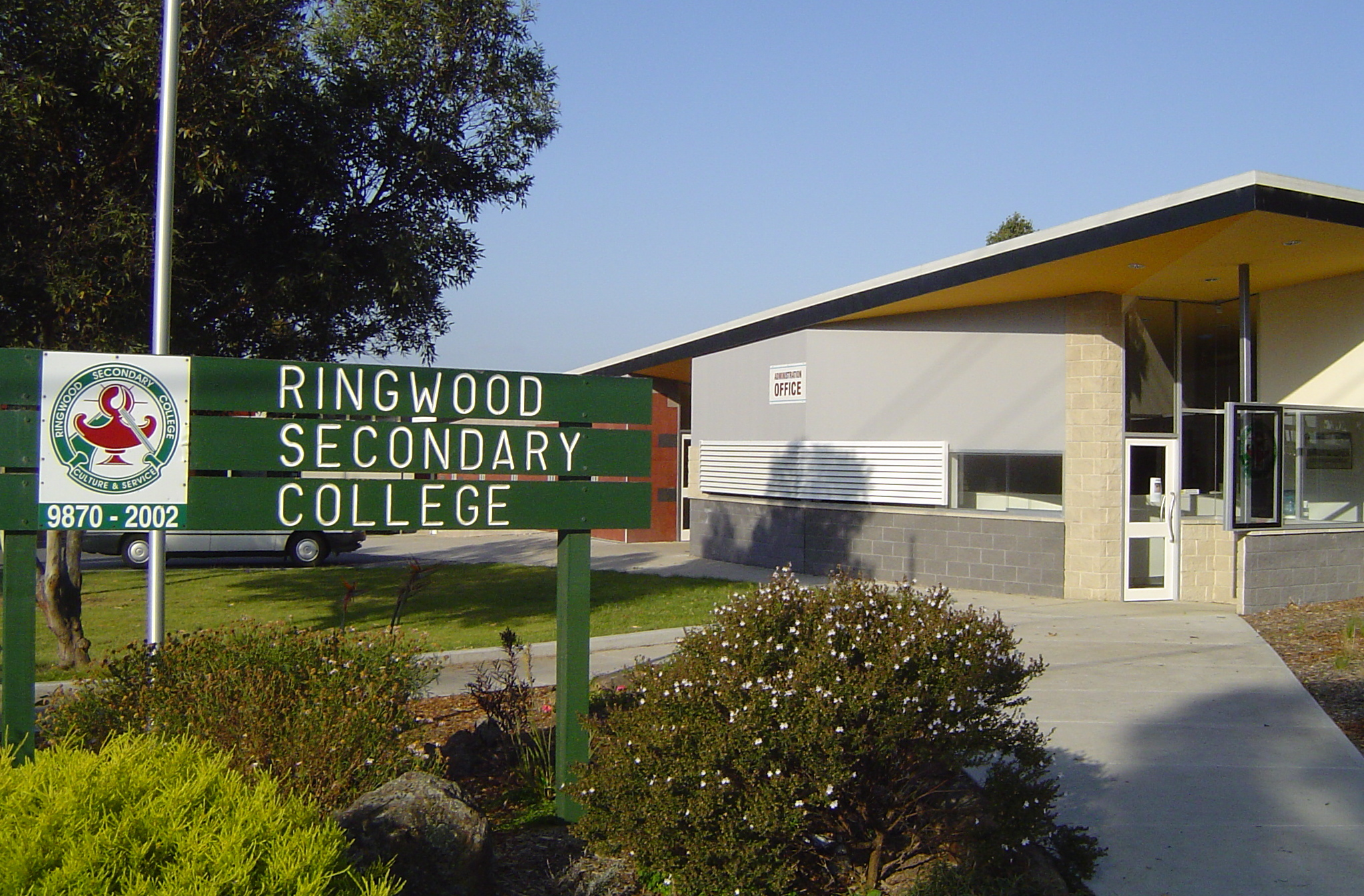
Bedford Rd. frontage.

Ringwood Secondary College is a co-educational public secondary school located in the eastern suburb of Ringwood in Melbourne, Victoria, Australia.

Ringwood Secondary College opened as Ringwood High School in 1954 and was one of the first high schools to be constructed in the new Light Timber Construction (LTC) style, which was developed by the Public Works Department in Victoria to address a chronic shortage in high school places in the 1950s.

Ringwood Secondary College provides education for years 7–12. Year 11 and 12 students undertake the VCE program. There are currently approximately 1460 students enrolled at the school.

RSC offers an extensive range of Victorian Certificate of Education (VCE) subjects as well as the Victorian Certificate of Applied Learning (VCAL) programme. The college has developed a centre of excellence for Automotive, Engineering and Manufacturing.

The Music and Performing Arts Program at Ringwood Secondary College includes three concert bands, four stage bands, three string ensembles and two choirs. In recent competitions, Melbourne School Bands Festival, Mt Gambier Generations in Jazz and the Royal South Street Competition, the school has received awards for its stage bands, strings ensembles and symphonic orchestra.

== Notable alumni ==
- Mark Bolton, Australian Football League player for Essendon Football Club
- Professor Warwick Gullett, Dean of Law at the University of Wollongong, author, and academic in environmental and maritime law
- Oscar McInerney, AFL player
- Benjamin Grant Mitchell: singer/songwriter and actor in Neighbours
- Hannah Monson, actress, known for playing Nicolette Stone in Neighbours
- Geoff Paine, actor, known for playing Clive Gibbons in Neighbours
- John Wood, actor in Blue Heelers, Offspring and Neighbours
- Jess Sinclair, Australian Football League player for North Melbourne Football Club
- Keith Wolahan, Federal Politician for Menzies since 2022
- Ella Hose, Australian Paralympic representative at the 2024 Paralympic Games

== Modern culture ==
The Ringwood Secondary College Choir and Orchestra appeared in a 1998 music video by Australian alternative band This Is Serious Mum, leading fans to believe that one or more of the anonymous band members were actually teachers at the college.
