= St Mary's College, Adelaide =

St Mary's College
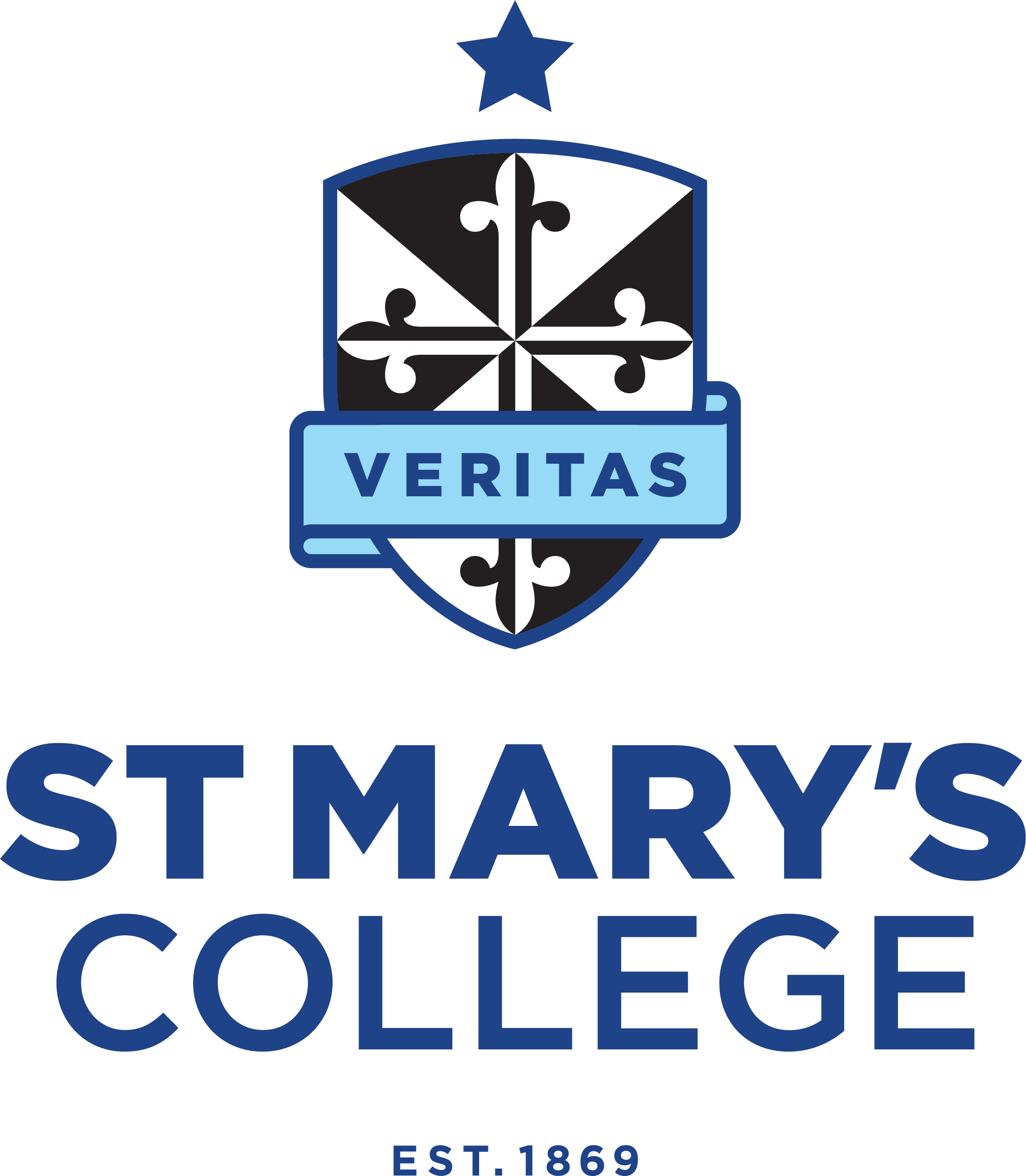

Location
- 253 Franklin Street; Adelaide, South Australia, 5000; Australia; 34°55′43″S 138°35′19″E

Information
- Type: Independent day school
- Motto: Latin: Veritas (Truth)
- Religious affiliation: Catholicism
- Denomination: Dominican Sisters
- Established: 1869; 157 years ago
- Principal: Heidi Senior
- Years: Reception – Year 12
- Gender: Girls
- Enrolment: 779 (2022)
- Campus type: Suburban
- Colours: Navy blue, light blue & white
- Affiliation: Independent Girls Schools Sports Association
- Website: www.stmarys.sa.edu.au

St Mary's College is a private Catholic primary and secondary school for girls located in the "square mile" of the city of Adelaide, South Australia.

== History ==
At the request of Laurence Sheil, then the Bishop of Adelaide, St Mary's College was initiated by the Dominican Sisters, who arrived from the Dominican Convent in Cabra, Ireland, as missionaries. The foundation stone was laid in 1868. The Sisters of St Joseph of the Sacred Heart provided primary education for students from the lower socioeconomic status, while the Dominican Sisters took responsibility for middle-class girls from both Catholic and other religious backgrounds whose parents could afford post-primary education. It is the oldest continuously running all-girls' school in South Australia; originally located in cottages on West Terrace and Franklin Street, with the convent and chapel from when the nuns first established the school is still there today.

== Academics ==
In 2021, over 800 girls attended the school in classes from Reception (age 5) to year 12 (age 17–18).

== Houses ==
When pupils first enrol at St. Mary's, they are assigned to one of the four sporting houses at the school; St Mary's, St Dominics, St Catherines and St Thomas. Annually, these teams compete against one another in events such as Sports Day, and other minor lunch sporting events such as Basketball, Netball and Volleyball.

== Immersion Programs ==
St Mary's selects Year 11 students to attend pilgrimages annually. One is called the "Lands Trip," and selects 6 - 8 girls to travel into the APY Lands to visit an Aboriginal community..

The other pilgrimage is to Vietnam. In 2005, 2006, 2007, and 2008 St Mary's College and Christian Brothers College students combined to participate in a Pilgrimage to Vietnam. The primary focus of the Pilgrimage is on giving service and working with orphaned, disabled children in the Phu My Orphanage in the Thi Nghe District, Saigon. The Orphanage is operated by the Sisters of St Paul de Charters, and houses over 300 children. However, due to new management from the Vietnamese school, St Mary's has stopped their visits to Vietnam in 2019.

== Campus ==
The campus contains:

- Four buildings containing classroom, computer, science, art and home economic facilities: the Boylan, Moore, Catherine and Kavanagh buildings
- Gymnasium
- Playground for Junior School
- Veritas Lawns and Convent Lawns
- STEM Centre
- Tennis courts
- Transportable classrooms
- The Performing Arts Centre College
- The restored Chapel and Convent

The school also shares a campus with St Patrick's Catholic Church and resides next to the Archbishop's House on West Terrace. The school borders three streets, the front-facing Franklin Street, the west side along West Terrace, and the back facing Grote Street.

== Notable alumni ==
- Alex Chidiac, Matildas football player
- Katelyn Pope, Port Adelaide Women's player
- Megan Blake Irwin, Model
