= St Monica's College =

Location
- Melbourne, Victoria; Australia; 37°39′4″S 145°1′49″E

Information
- Type: Catholic secondary school
- Motto: Pray and Persevere
- Denomination: Roman Catholic
- Patron saint: Saint Monica
- Established: 1964; 62 years ago
- Principal: Brian Edward Hanley
- Grades: Years 7–12
- Gender: Co-educational
- Campus: Junior Campus (Yrs 7–9) Dalton Rd, Epping; Senior Campus (Yrs 10–12) Davisson St, Epping
- Campus type: Outer Suburban
- Houses: Alkira, Glenora, Barinya, Larapinta
- Colours: Blue and gold
- Website: www.stmonicas-epping.com

St Monica's College is a Catholic co-educational secondary school which was established in 1964. Located across four main campuses, it is situated just north of Melbourne, Australia in the suburb of Epping. The College also includes a small country campus in Strath Creek which is used as a retreat and by visiting class groups. The College is a member of the Sports Association of Catholic Co-educational Secondary Schools (SACCSS).

== History ==
St Monica's College, Epping, originally began its operations as an annexe to St Peter's Primary School in 1964 under the auspices of the Sisters of the Good Samaritan. A growing population in the area made it clear that a fully functioning secondary school would soon be needed and the College at Epping was planned and building commenced in 1966.

The name, St Monica's, was bestowed on the College by Archbishop Simonds in 1966 but it was not until February 1967 that the completed buildings in Davisson Street were officially blessed and opened by Bishop Moran.

=== Principals ===
Between 1965 and 1989 the schools principals were all members of a Catholic order of nuns known as the Sisters of the Good Samaritan or S.G.S. In 1990 a lay principal was appointed for the first time.

1965–1966	Patricia Thame S.G.S
1967–1970	Mary Duffy S.G.S
1971	Mary Laserian Crowe S.G.S
1972–1976	Helen Lombard S.G.S
1976–1985	Therese Quinn S.G.S
1985–1989	Harriet Gleeson S.G.S
1990–	Brian E. Hanley OAM

=== Principal's Dinner ===
The school holds an annual Principal's Dinner about halfway through the school year, a celebration and gathering for students, their parents (or guardians), and staff. The school has received criticism for insisting that students with a deceased or unavailable parent may not use their tickets for a sibling or other member of their support network.

== Facilities ==
=== Davisson Street Campus ===
This is the senior campus and administration centre for the College. It also includes an IT centre, science labs, visual and performing arts facilities, a library, chapel, gymnasium, and sports fields, among other facilities.

=== Dalton Road Campus ===
This is the junior campus, which is a short distance away. The campus provides open areas which service the curriculum, sport and performing arts requirements. Facilities in this campus include a library, science and computer labs, the Lorraine Pratt Sports Fields, an arts wing, a chapel, a food technology centre, a music centre, and the wetlands, among others.

=== Ostia ===
Ostia is the College's country retreat facility at Strath Creek in country Victoria.

=== Sport ===
The school has sports facilities for Australian rules football, Volleyball, athletics, swimming, cross country running, Basketball, tennis, golf and Futsal.

=== Extra-curricular programs ===
The school provides extra-curricular programs such as the Good Samaritan Inn program.

== Notable alumni ==
- Simon Colosimo – Australian footballer
- Reno Piscopo – Australian footballer
- Alex Sexton – Australian Football League player
- Jayden Short – Australian Football League player
