= Sunrise Christian School =

Schools in South Australia

- Adelaide, South Australia

Information
- Established: 1978; 48 years ago
- Enrollment: c.1000
- Campuses: Fullarton, Marion, Morphett Vale, Paradise, Naracoorte, Whyalla
- Website: www.sunrise.sa.edu.au

Sunrise Christian School is an independent Christian co-educational school network in South Australia, Australia. Established in 1978, the school operates multiple campuses across metropolitan and regional South Australia and is a member of Adelaide Christian Schools Inc. The school provides education from Early Learning through to primary and middle school, with pathways to senior secondary education through affiliated schools.

== History ==
Sunrise Christian School was founded in 1978 as a ministry of Adelaide Christian Centre (Sturt Street) following a vision by Senior Pastor Leo Harris to establish a Christ-centred school based on biblical principles. A steering committee was formed in 1977 to oversee the development of the school, and the first campus opened at Fullarton in 1978. The school began with approximately 30 students and has since expanded to multiple campuses across South Australia.

== Curriculum ==
The school delivers a curriculum based on the South Australian Curriculum while integrating Christian teachings and a biblical worldview into learning. Students participate in academic, sporting, cultural, and community activities. The school states that its educational philosophy focuses on developing students academically, socially, emotionally, and spiritually.

== Governance ==
Sunrise Christian School is governed by Adelaide Christian Schools Inc., an incorporated association that also oversees several other Christian educational institutions in Australia and overseas. Governance includes educational oversight and spiritual guidance for the school's operations.
