= Adelaide Botanic High School =

Public secondary school in South Australia, Australia

- The animated form of the ABHS logo.

Location
- Frome Road; Adelaide, South Australia; Australia; 34.917°S 138.607°E

Information
- Type: Public, secondary
- Motto: Tomorrow, Today
- Established: 2019
- Founders: Alistair Brown
- Principal: Sarah Chambers (2025)
- Grades: 7–12
- Enrolment: ~1250 (2021)
- Colours: Botanic green, storm grey
- Website: abhs.sa.edu.au

Adelaide Botanic High School (ABHS) is a coeducational public secondary school situated on Frome Road in Adelaide, South Australia. The school's campus is situated on land adjoining the Adelaide Botanic Garden and the former site of the Royal Adelaide Hospital and is partly built from the structure of the old Reid Building from the University of South Australia.

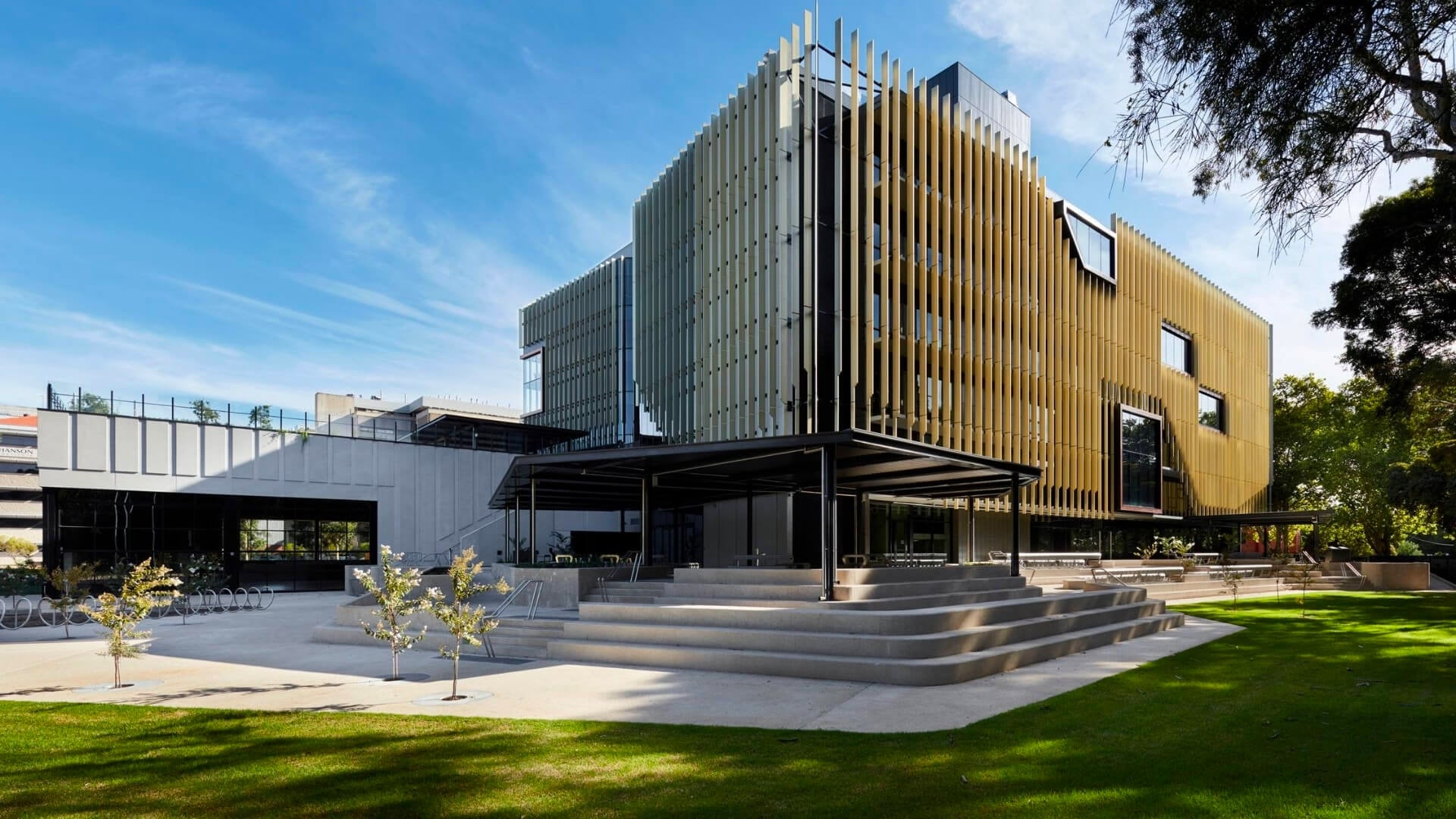
The view of ABHS from the North east.

== History ==
Adelaide Botanic High School opened on 29 January 2019 under the leadership of Foundation Principal Alistair Brown, who had previously held the role of Principal at Heathfield High School in the Adelaide Hills. The school opened on the site of what was previously known as the Reid Building, which housed the University of South Australia's School of Pharmacy and Medical Sciences before its relocation to the university's City East campus. The six-storey building underwent extensive renovations as part of the Department for Education's $100 million development project and another seven-storey building was constructed on the southern side of the building. Both of these buildings are conjoined by a six-storey atrium which includes several multipurpose learning areas.

At the time of the school's opening, student enrolment numbers totalled to approximately 350 students in Years 8 and 9. In 2022, the school's Year 7 cohort commenced as part of the Department for Education's statewide transition of Year 7 into the high school setting.

In 2022, it was announced that the school will be expanded. Soon after, the expansion began.

== Facilities ==
Facilities at Adelaide Botanic High School include:

- External learning and recreation areas in and around the parklands and on the upper levels of the two buildings
- Food Technology kitchens
- Indoor gymnasium and fitness studio
- Library and research centre
- Music and Drama performance, practice and learning spaces
- Performing Arts theatre
- Science, Design and Technology laboratories

== Incidents ==
On 24 August 2021, a 13-year-old school boy was charged with aggravated assault, carrying a dangerous weapon and common assault, after stabbing another student with scissors. The charges were dropped on 23 February 2022.
