= Marryatville High School =

Public school in Marryatville, South Australia

Coordinates: 34°55′44″S 138°38′44″E

- Kensington Road, Marryatville, South Australia; Australia

Information
- Type: Public
- Established: 1877 (as Norwood Model School)
- Principal: Julie Ferguson
- Faculty: 150
- Enrolment: 1405
- Campus: Two (Middle and Senior [Eden Park for Year 12s])
- Houses: Pari (blue), Kardla (red), Tirntu (yellow), Yarta (green), Kakirra (white)
- Colours: Navy blue, sky blue, white
- Affiliation: Sports Association for Adelaide Schools
- Website: http://www.marryatvillehs.sa.edu.au

Marryatville High School (MHS) is a public state high school in Adelaide, South Australia. The school is situated on a large area of land in the eastern suburb of Marryatville, part of the City of Norwood Payneham and St Peters. First Creek cuts through the school grounds and large gum trees line the property. The school was founded in 1976 during the Dunstan era, from the amalgamation of the Norwood Boys' Technical High School and the Kensington & Norwood Girls' High School.

== History ==
Marryatville High School's roots go back to 1877, moving through several incarnations until its naming in 1976 as a co-educational high school:

=== Norwood Model School (1877–1942) ===
The Norwood Model School was opened on the east side of Osmond Terrace (between the Parade and Beulah Road) in response to the 1875 Act which provided for State funding of school buildings and compulsory education for children aged 7 to 13. With the establishment of Norwood High School in 1910, it continued as a "Central School" until they were abolished in 1940, at which point it became a Junior Technical School.

=== Norwood Boys Junior Technical School (1942–1960) ===
The Junior Technical School continued to expand at the Osmond Terrace site, and in 1944 the Education Department bought 20 acres on Kensington Road at Marryatville. In 1947 Premier announced that classrooms and workshops would be built at Marryatville, and in 1950 tenders were called and work began. The workshops were opened in 1953. enrolments increased rapidly through the 1950s.

=== Norwood Boys Technical School (1961–1973) ===
Norwood Boys Technical School was officially opened in 1961 and the school continued to expand. In 1964 the school enrolment was 695 boys, 784 students attending night classes, and the Astronomical Observatory opened. enrolments peaked in the low 700s in the late 1960s, but by 1972 this had dropped to 316 and it was announced that the school would be converted to a comprehensive high school.

=== Marryatville Boys' High School (1974–1976) ===
The school was renamed in 1974 with an enrolment of 290. In 1975 it was announced that the school would amalgamate with the Kensington & Norwood Girls' High School.

=== Marryatville High School (1976–present) ===
Marryatville High School, known colloquially by the school referring to itself and by others in reference to its sports teams, etc. as MHS, formed in 1976 with a focus on a special interest music program, which it maintains today. The first principal was Glen McArthur, who served in the position till 1991, by which time the school had a well-established reputation and enrolment.

Severe floods in November 2005 overflowed the banks of First Creek and caused some damage to the school.

== Curriculum ==
Marryatville High School was accredited as an international school by the Council of International Schools in 2003 and formed a number of sister school relationships in France, Japan and China. The school specialises in particular subject areas, including music, drama, languages and tennis.

=== Music ===
One of the school's main focuses is music, as the school is one of four Specialist Interest Music Schools in South Australia. The Marryatville High School big bands have also won music competitions around the country, notably at Generations In Jazz several times over recent years. In 2007, the Concert Choir won the SA state final of the inaugural ABC Classic FM Choir of the Year Competition and second place in the national final, and won the Children's and Youth Choir section of the 10th International Choir Festival "Tallinn 2007" in Estonia.

=== Drama ===
The Performing Arts Centre, named "The Forge", is able to showcase drama, dance and musical performances. For the official opening of the school's theatre in 2005, a production by drama students was presented to guests including then South Australian Premier Mike Rann and state member for Norwood Vini Ciccarello. When talking to the cast and crew after the opening show, Mr Rann exclaimed, "I've never seen anything this good, at either a High School, University or TAFE". The drama department performs year level performances for students in year 10, 11 and 12, as well as putting on a Fringe performance in term 1, that for the first time in 2018, included a class of dancers, led by Ms K Cornish.

=== Tennis ===
Marryatville High School also has a strong tennis program for students who are chosen by the school when they are in years 6 and 7. Each year level contains an average of 7 tennis students. These students study tennis as a subject, with theoretical study, as well as practice lessons during, before and after school. The tennis program is taught by accredited coaches, and includes participation in many state and national competitions.

== Facilities ==
Eden Park, a grand two-storey Victorian house, is now used as the high school's Year 12 campus; the timber stables have been converted into a music centre. In 2005 Marryatville's Performing Arts Centre, The Forge, was opened. It serves as a performance area for year 11 and 12 Drama Productions and is also used by outside theatre groups. There is also a large gymnasium.

The school's most modern blocks are H Block and the Pines, the latter of which began operations in 2022 with the influx of Year 7 students, which the school was hosting for the first time. H Block is predominantly used for the sciences, having lab classrooms which include Bunsen burner gas valves, sinks, and other scientific equipment.

The school has a very progressive agenda, being a 'discrimination-free zone', and is one of only a few schools in Adelaide with Unisex toilets. The school provides significant support to the LGBTQIA+ community, with activities during Pride Month and on Pride Day and consistent engagement and representation of the LGBTQIA+ in the school community.

== Principals ==
- 1942 Cliff Rooney
- 1961 P B Hillbig
- 1964 R M Macpherson
- 1965 Norman Dowdy
- 1969 G B Payne
- 1975 Glen McArthur
- 1992 Kate Castine
- 2004 Mark Leahy
- 2018 John Tiver
- 2024 Julie Ferguson

== Notable alumni ==
- Imogen Annesley, film actress (Playing Beatie Bow)
- Tilda Cobham-Hervey, actress (52 Tuesdays, Hotel Mumbai)
- Sam Duluk, member of the South Australia Parliament for Waite
- Callum Ferguson, Australian cricketer
- Michelle Lensink, South Australian politician
- Brad McKenzie, Australian rules footballer, North Melbourne Football Club.
- George Oates, designer
- Marijana Rajcic, football player with Adelaide AFL club, ex-football player in Adelaide United FC
- Katrina Sedgwick, founding director of the Adelaide Film Festival, and director of the Australian Centre for the Moving Image
- Michelle Tumes, contemporary Christian musician

== Film location ==
The film Hey Hey It's Esther Blueburger (2008) included several scenes filmed at the school.

The TV Series First Day (TV series) (2020) was filmed predominantly at the school.
