= Roscoe James Irwin =

Australian musician, composer, and producer (born 1983)

- Also known as: Ross Irwin, Roscoe James Irwin
- Born: 21 February 1983 (age 43); Melbourne, Victoria, Australia
- Genres: Indie pop, folk, jazz
- Occupations: Musician, composer, arranger, producer
- Instruments: Vocals, trumpet, piano, guitar, percussion
- Years active: 2002–present
- Labels: Independent, Alberts Publishing, Vitamin Records, BMG

Roscoe James Irwin (born 21 February 1983) is an Australian trumpet player, arranger, composer, multi-instrumentalist and producer. He is most known for his work as one of the trumpet players and the musical director for Australian band The Cat Empire as well as his work as an arranger for studio and live projects and his work composing for film.

== Biography ==
Irwin was raised in the Dandenong Ranges in Victoria. He attended Blackburn High School and then The Victorian College of the Arts. He began his longtime associating with The Cat Empire in 2002 after playing jazz concerts with many of the members through their high school years. Irwin is considered one of the most prolific musicians and arrangers in Australia due to his mass of work with so many well-known local and international artists. In 2023 he composed the score for the horror film, Late Night with the Devil.

== Live Credits ==
As a trumpet player, singer, multi-instrumentalist, and arranger/composer, Irwin has performed live with artists such as Harry Connick Jr, Robbie Williams, Midnight Oil, Hugh Jackman, Brian May and Roger Taylor (Queen), Angus and Julia Stone, Vance Joy, Belle and Sebastian, The Teskey Brothers, Paul Kelly, Megan Washington, The Cat Empire, The Bamboos, Chet Faker, Boy and Bear, Mary Wilson (The Supremes), Ben Elton, Pete Tong, Roy Ayers, Syl Johnson, Eddie Floyd, Betty Harris, Joe Bataan, Suzie Quatro, Ross Wilson, Hal Wilner, Patti Austin, Tony Hadley (Spandau Ballet), Jimmy Barnes, Joe Camilleri and The Black Sorrows, Brooke Fraser, Yael Stone, Marcia Hines, Jon Stevens, Ngaiire, Kate Ceberano, Pierce Brothers, Dan Sultan, Ella Hooper, Human Nature, The Kite String Tangle, Remi, Spinifex Gum, Tim Rogers, Robert Forster, The Paper Kites, Judith Durham, Budjurah, Jimmy Webb, Michael Feinstein, Eric Mingus, Andrew Lippa, Emma Pask, Ministry of Sound Classical, Tom Burlinson, Steph Strings, Brain Cadd, The Resin Dogs, David Bridie, Marlon Williams, Black Joe Lewis, Neal Francis, Kurt Elling, Joey DeFrancesco, Hayden Calnin, David Campbell, Melbourne Symphony Orchestra, Sydney Symphony Orchestra, Adelaide Symphony Orchestra, Queensland Symphony Orchestra, WASO, Tasmanian Symphony Orchestra, Canberra Symphony Orchestra.

== Studio Credits ==
As a trumpet player, singer, multi-instrumentalist, arranger and producer, Irwin has recorded with, and contributed to albums and recordings for artists such as Passenger, Vance Joy, Dope Lemon, Dean Lewis, Hilltop Hoods, Angus and Julia Stone, Leo Sayer, Paul Kelly, Jet, Cub Sport, The Cat Empire, The Bamboos, King Gizzard and the Lizard Wizard, Megan Washington, The Kite String Tangle, Jessica Mauboy, Sumner, SAFIA, Pierce Brothers, Holy Holy, The Paper Kites, Dustin Tebbutt, Gosling, Thelma Plum, M-Phazes, The Melbourne Symphony Orchestra, Harrison Storm, Illy, Seth Sentry, Kate Ceberano, Lanks, Kathleen Halloran, Tim Rogers, You Am I, and Emma Pask.

== Solo Project Discography ==
=== Albums ===
List of albums, with selected details
Title	Details
The Hunting Road	Released: September 2011; Format: CD, digital; Label: Roscoe James Irwin (RJI001)

=== Extended plays ===
List of EPs, with selected details
Title	Details
Wasted	Released: September 2013; Format: CD, digital; Label: Roscoe James Irwin
The Wild	Released: March 2015; Format: digital; Label: Roscoe James Irwin

== Other projects ==
- The Cat Empire
- The Bamboos
