= Littlehampton, South Australia =

Littlehampton
- Town
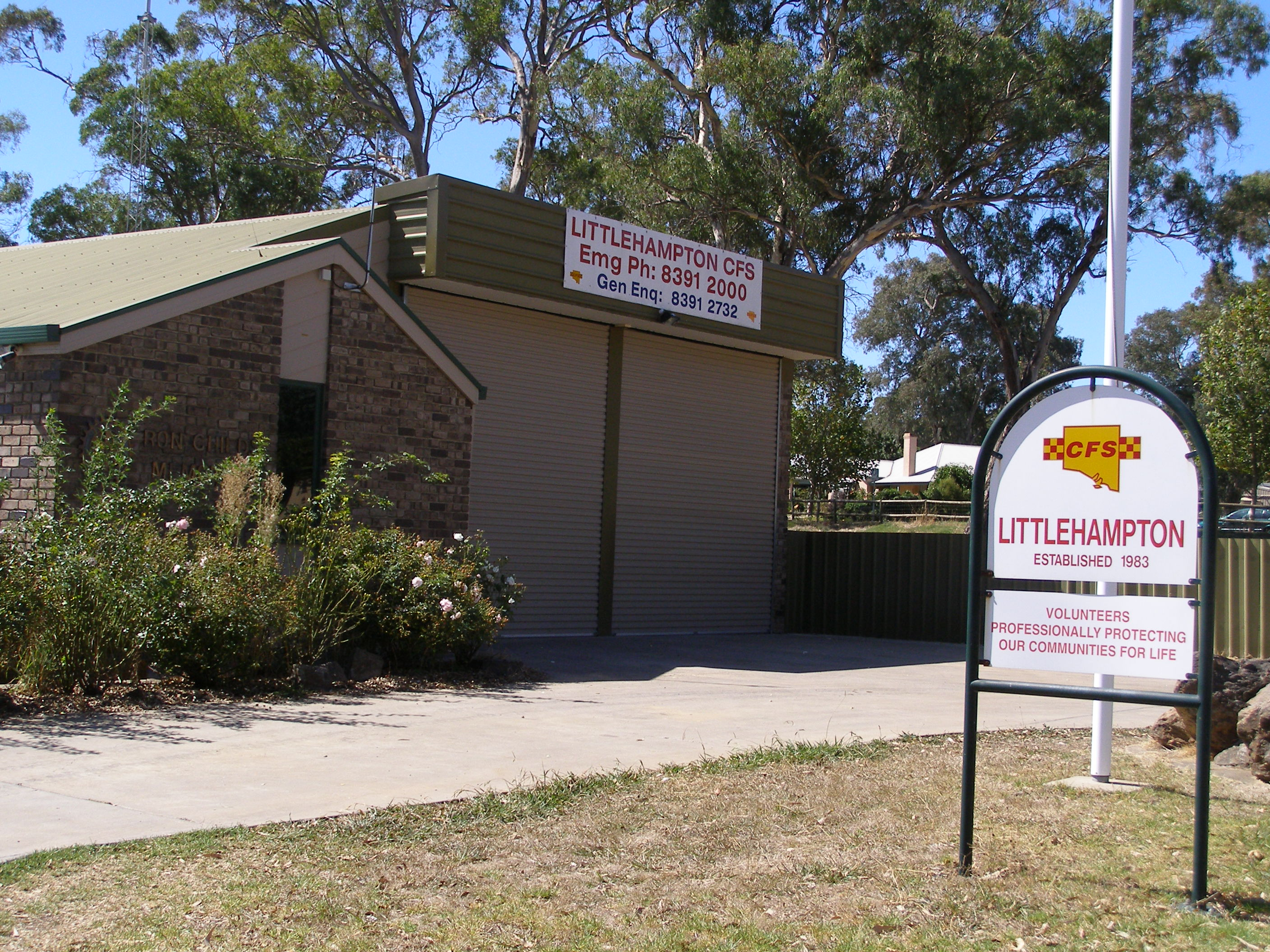
- Littlehampton Country Fire Station

- Coordinates: 35°03′0″S 138°51′0″E
- Country: Australia
- State: South Australia
- LGA: Mount Barker
- Location: 5 km (3.1 mi) from Mount Barker
- Established: 1836

Government
  - State electorate: Kavel
  - Federal division: Mayo

Population
  - Total: 3,300 (SAL 2021)
- Postcode: 5250
Localities around Littlehampton
Hahndorf	Balhannah	Blakiston
Totness	Littlehampton	Mount Barker
Paechtown	Mount Barker	Mount Barker

Littlehampton is a village in the Adelaide Hills of South Australia, located on the Old Princes Highway. It is approximately 35 minutes from the Adelaide CBD via the South Eastern Freeway.

At the time of the 2016 Australian census, Littlehampton had a population of 3,522.

Littlehampton was laid out in 1849 by Benjamin Gray, who named it after his native town in Sussex.

By 1890, the village had become a busy industrial centre with a sawmill, brewery and various manufacturers producing jams, sauces, bacon, wattle extract. There were five brick works.

Littlehampton Bricks, which continues to operate today, was established in 1913, developing from another brickyard–Coppins–on the opposite side of the main road into Littlehampton.

The 1862 church on Main Street—North Tce and now Princes Hwy—was one of the oldest active Churches in South Australia until 2020. This United Church ceased services due to the COVID-19 pandemic.

The now disused Mount Barker Junction-Mount Barker railway line runs through Littlehampton.

== Subterranean Clover ==
The first commercial collection in the world of any pasture legume seed was done by Amos Howard about two kilometres east of Littlehampton. This was of Trifolium subterraneum (Subterranean Clover), sub species suubterraneum. This cultivar was later named 'Mount Barker' and is still commercially available.

== Fire service ==
The Littlehampton Country Fire Service (CFS) is the volunteer fire service of Littlehampton. They are part of the Heysen group.
