= May Mills =

South Australian sports administrator, educator (1890–1984)

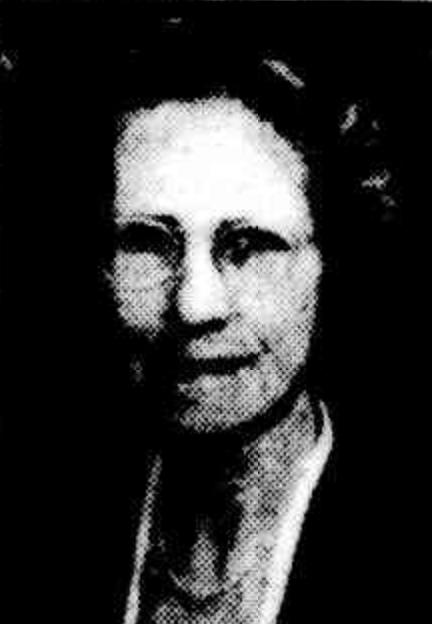
- May Mills
- Born: 19 July 1890; Kanmantoo, South Australia
- Died: 21 January 1984 (aged 93); Adelaide, South Australia
- Occupation: Educator
- Known for: Sports administration, Women's sport, education

May Mills OBE (19 July 1890 – 21 January 1984) was a pioneering sports administrator and educator in South Australia who helped to raise the status and opportunities for women in sport.

== Contribution to women's sport ==
Mills was founding president (1953) of the South Australian Women's Amateur Sports Council serving as president for seven years. She was President of the Australian Women's Cricket Council and the S.A. Women's Cricket Association and became a life member of both. She helped to establish and develop at St Marys the South Australian Women's Memorial Playing Fields, a memorial to women who served in both world wars.

Mills was an avid advocate for women's sport and successfully lobbied then Premier, Sir Thomas Playford, to secure access to playing fields for the dedicated use of women. for the dedication of the entire area of 8 hectares of the Playing Fields in memory of the contribution made by women from the Army, Navy and Air Force during World War II with a particular focus on the 1942 Bangka Strait massacre. The Bangka Strait Memorial Service was first held in 1955, with a dedication service in 1956 and has continued annually in February each year.

May helped finance and raise funds for the establishment and maintenance of the Memorial Playing Fields. From 1963 administration of the Playing Fields was taken over by the South Australian Women's Memorial Field Trust and May became president and life member. A pavilion there was named after her in 1967.

In 2008 the Minister for Recreation, Sport and Racing, as owner of the land, granted a 21-year lease to the South Australian Cricket Association. The South Australian Cricket Association now manages and maintains the fields and has long-term plans for the upgrade and development of the facility. Women's cricket, lacrosse, hockey, tennis and soccer all continue to be played at the fields.

The SA Women's Memorial Playing Fields Trust continues to oversee the Memorial aspect of the site as well as organising the annual Bangka Day Memorial Service.

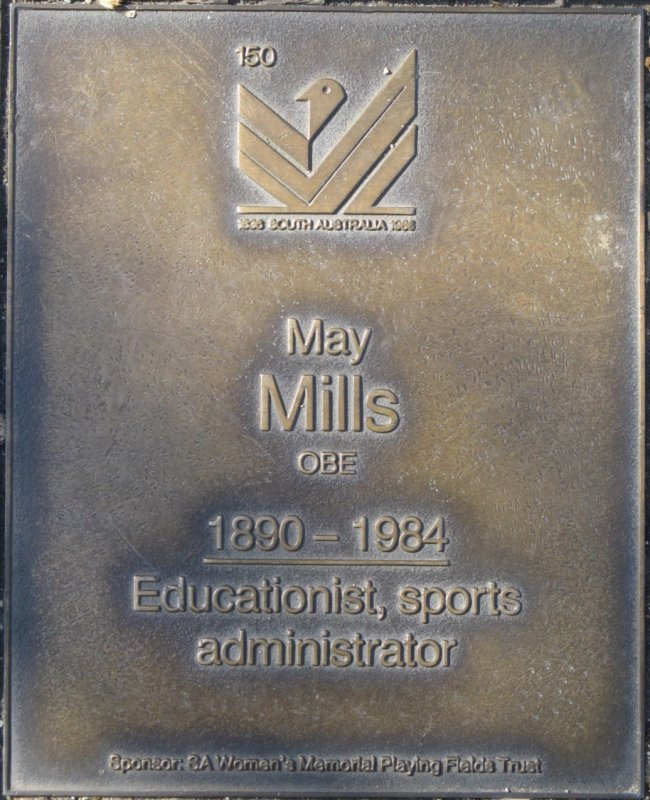
Jubilee 150 Walkway plaque – May Mills

== Education and other achievements ==
Mills taught at Unley High School for thirty years. She was the first female President of the South Australian Institute of Teachers in 1943 which eventually became part of the Australian Education Union. Mills was the first president of the South Australian Film and Television Council, a founding member of the Australian College of Educators, life vice-president of the National Council of Women and a life member of the Royal Commonwealth Society. Always a pioneer and innovator she was the first women in South Australia to secure a license to drive a motor car.

== OBE and recognition ==
For her services to education and for her work in establishing the Memorial Playing Fields, May was awarded the Order of the British Empire (OBE) in 1960.

In 1986 a plaque in recognition of her contribution to South Australia was included in the Jubilee 150 Walkway.

== Death and legacy ==
Miss Mills died on 21 January 1984 in Adelaide and was buried in Blakiston cemetery. A bequeath to the Flinders University of South Australia enabled the establishment of the May Mills re-entry scholarship for women in 1989. May Mills contribution to women's cricket was recognised in 1984/85 by the creation of the May Mills Trophy for the Under 18 national Championship which ran until 1995/96.
