= Jubilee 150 Walkway =

Memorial plaques in Adelaide, South Australia

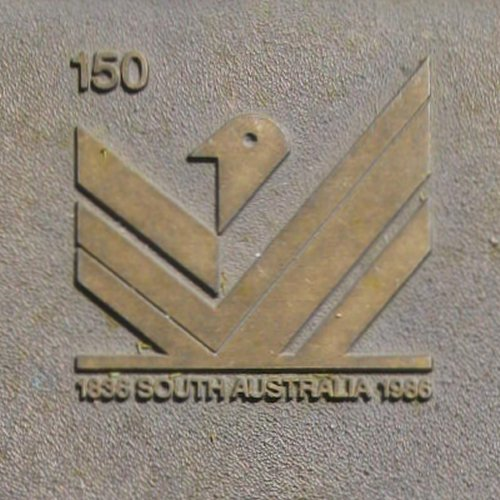
The Jubilee 150 logo.

The Jubilee 150 Walkway, also variously known as the Jubilee 150 Commemorative Walk, the Jubilee 150 Walk, Jubilee 150 Plaques, the Jubilee Walk, or simply J150, is a series of (initially) 150 bronze plaques set into the pavement of North Terrace, Adelaide, South Australia from King William Street to Pulteney Street.

== History ==
Jubilee 150 Walkway was officially opened on 21 December 1986. It was commissioned as part of the celebrations commemorating the 150th anniversary of the founding of the British Province of South Australia on 28 December 1836.

== Overview ==
The plaques, initially 150 in number, contained the names of 170 people who made major contributions to the colony and later state of South Australia. (Note: Eight of the plaques include the names of more than one person: Sir William and Sir Lawrence Bragg; Julia Warren Farr and George Henry Farr; WWI VC recipients: Blackburn, Davey, Inwood, Jensen, Leak, Sullivan, Weathers, Woods; WWII VC & GC recipients: Derrick, Gosse, Kibby, Matthews; Peter Nelson and Marjorie Jackson-Nelson; Sir Keith and Sir Ross Smith; Pioneer vignerons: Johann Gramp, Richard Hamilton, Joseph Seppelt, Samuel Smith; Pioneer vignerons: Thomas Hardy, Christopher Penfold, Mary Penfold, John Reynell) The Adelaide City Council has since added four plaques, (Note: The four additional plaques commemorate: Sir Samuel Benson Dickinson; John Dunn; W. H. Gray; Sir George Hubert Wilkins) embellished with the City of Adelaide coat of arms rather than the Jubilee 150 logo, so now comprises 154 plaques containing the names of 174 people, plus two "bookends".

The plaques are mostly arranged in alphabetic order, (Note: The exceptions to strict alphabetic order are: The 13 South Australians awarded the V.C. and the G.C. in the two World Wars and the Vietnam War appear in front of the War Memorial; Mary Lee's plaque appears between the plaques for Stow and Strange; Torrens and Traeger are interchanged; The eight pioneer vignerons are grouped on two plaques between Veale and Waite.) and stretch from King William Road to Pulteney Street along the north side of North Terrace. The walkway starts at the South African War Memorial, and passes in front of Government House, the National War Memorial, the State Library, the Museum, the Art Gallery and the University complex.

== List ==
Plaque	Name	Known for
	Acknowledgements	
	George Fife Angas	
	George French Angas	
	Sir Henry Ayers	
	Walter Hervey Bagot	
South African Boer War Memorial by A. Jones
	John Stokes Bagshaw	
	Sir Richard Baker	
	Robert Barr Smith	
	Tom Elder Barr Smith	
	Percy Raymond Begg	
	Dervish Bejah	
	John Bishop	
	John McConnell Black	
	Abraham Tobias Boas	
	Lady Jean Bonython	
	Sir John Langdon Bonython	
Dame Roma Mitchell, modelled by Janette Moore, sculpted by John Woffinden and Sally Francis
	Sir Donald Bradman	
	Sir William and Sir Lawrence Bragg	
	Hooper Josse Brewster Jones	
	Sir George Brookman	
	Henry John 'Harry' Butler	
	Sir Hugh Cairns	
	Charles Witto-Witto Cawthorne	
Statue of Venus (Venere di Canova) donated by W. A. Horn in 1892
	Sir Robert Chapman	
	Sir John Cleland	
	Kate Cocks	
Busts of Florey, Oliphant, Lee, Napier, Bragg (father and son)
	Sir Walter Crocker	
	Dave Dallwitz	
	Sir Samuel Davenport	
	Constance Muriel Davey	
	Peter Dawson	
	Lillian Daphne de Lissa	
	C. J. Dennis	
	Sir Samuel Benson Dickinson	
Captain Matthew Flinders by F. Brook Hitch
	Charles Duguid	
	Sir Lloyd Dumas	
	John Dunn	
	Don Dunstan	
	Sir Thomas Elder	
	Gladys Elphick	
	Julia Warren Farr	
	Francis Hardey Faulding	
	Lord Florey	
	Reverend John Flynn	
	David Fowler	
	Alfred Edward Gerard	
National War Memorial – Great War – 1914–1918 by Woods, Bagot, Jory & Laybourne Smith; and Rayner Hoff
	Sir Claude Gibb	
	WWI VC recipients: Blackburn, Davey, Inwood, Jensen, Leak, Sullivan, Weathers, Woods	
	WWII VC & GC recipients: Derrick, Gosse, Kibby, Matthews	
	Vietnam War VC recipient: Major Peter Badcoe	
	Gladys Ruth Gibson	
	William Anstey Giles	
	S. T. Gill	
	Walter Gill	
Kintore Avenue; Institute Building
	William Gosse	
	George Goyder	
	Margaret Graham	
	W. H. Gray	
	Sir Archibald Grenfell Price	
	George Hall	
Huge bronze statue of Edward VII by Sir Bertram Mackennal
	Henry Richard 'Captain' Hancock	
	Alfred Hannaford	
	George Hannaford	
	John Anderson Hartley	
State Library of South Australia; John Dowie, Robert Burns
	George Frederick Hassell	
	Charles Allen Seymour Hawker	
	Colin Sidney Hayes	
	Sir Edward Hayward	
	Sir Robert Helpmann	
	Sir Hans Heysen	
	Harold Eustace Hill-Ling	
Mortlock Library
	Sir Edward Holden	
	Amos William Howard	
	Sir Walter Hughes	
	Sir Roland Jacobs	
	'Jimmy' James	
	Norman William Jolly	
Museum of Natural History
	Pastor August Kavel	
	Sir Sidney Kidman	
	Charles Cameron Kingston	
	Sir George Kingston	
	Andrew Kirkpatrick	
	Essington Lewis	
	Colonel William Light	
	Dame Ruby Litchfield	
	Mary Helen MacKillop	
	Murdoch Stanley McLeod	
	John Abel McPherson	
	Cecil Thomas Madigan	
	James Martin	
	Sir Douglas Mawson	
	Frederick May	
	George Elton Mayo	
	Helen Mary Mayo	
	Sir John Melrose	
	Adelaide Laetitia Miethke	
	May Mills	
	Dame Roma Mitchell	
Art Gallery of South Australia
	Sir William Mitchell	
	Daniel Moriarty	
	William Ranson Mortlock	
	Charles Pearcy Mountford	
	William Muirden	
	Sir Mellis Napier	
	Peter Nelson and Marjorie Jackson-Nelson	
	Paris Nesbit	
	Sir Henry Newland	
	Eldred Norman	
	Sir Mark Oliphant	
University of Adelaide: Mitchell Building
	Sir Thomas Playford	
	James Arthur Prescott	
	Margaret Rose Preston	
	Tom Price	
Statue of Sir Walter Watson Hughes
	Alexander Maurice Ramsay	
	William Richard Randell	
	Arnold Edwin Victor Richardson	
	Victor York Richardson	
	John Ridley	
	Luther Robert Scammell	
	Richard Moritz Schomburgk	
	Adolf John Schulz	
	Alexandrina Seager	
	Ronald Max'y Sharpe	
	David Shearer	
	Augustus Short	
Statue of Sir Samuel Way
Elder Conservatorium of Music
	Alfred Muller Simpson	
	Sir Edwin Smith	
	Sir Keith and Sir Ross Smith	
	Richard B. Smith	
Statues of Sir Douglas Mawson and Sir Thomas Elder
	Catherine Helen Spence	
	Sir Edward Stirling	
	Thomas Quinton Stow	
	Mary Lee	
University of Adelaide: Bonython Hall
	Arthur Thomas 'Padre' Strange	
	John McDouall Stuart	
	Charles Sturt	
	Doris Taylor	
	Julian Edmund Tenison-Woods	
	Norman Tindale	
	Sir Charles Todd	
University of Adelaide: Napier Building
	Alexander Tolmer	
	Alfred Herman Traeger	
	Sir Robert Torrens	
	David Unaipon	
	William Charles Douglas Veale	
	Pioneer Vignerons: Johann Gramp, Richard Hamilton, Joseph Seppelt, Samuel Smith	
	Pioneer Vignerons: Thomas Hardy, Christopher Penfold, Mary Penfold, John Reynell	
	Peter Waite	
	Mary Jane Warnes	
	Sir Samuel Way	
	Lawrence Allen Wells	
	Jochim Matthias Wendt	
	Sir George Hubert Wilkins	
	Sir Kenneth Wills	
	Edmund William Wright	
Ligertwood Building
	Acknowledgements	

== Gallery ==
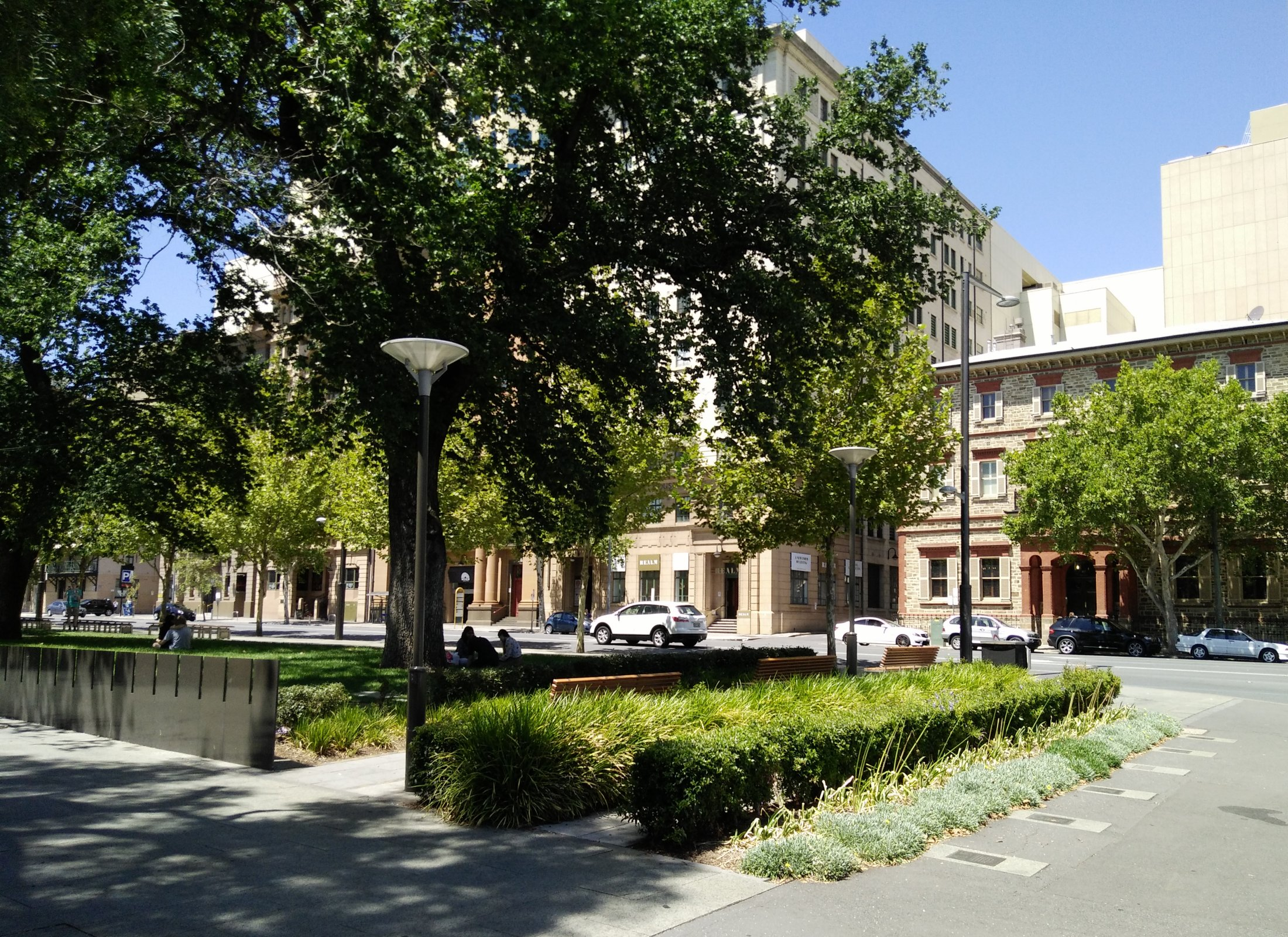
The start of the walkway plaques near King William Road

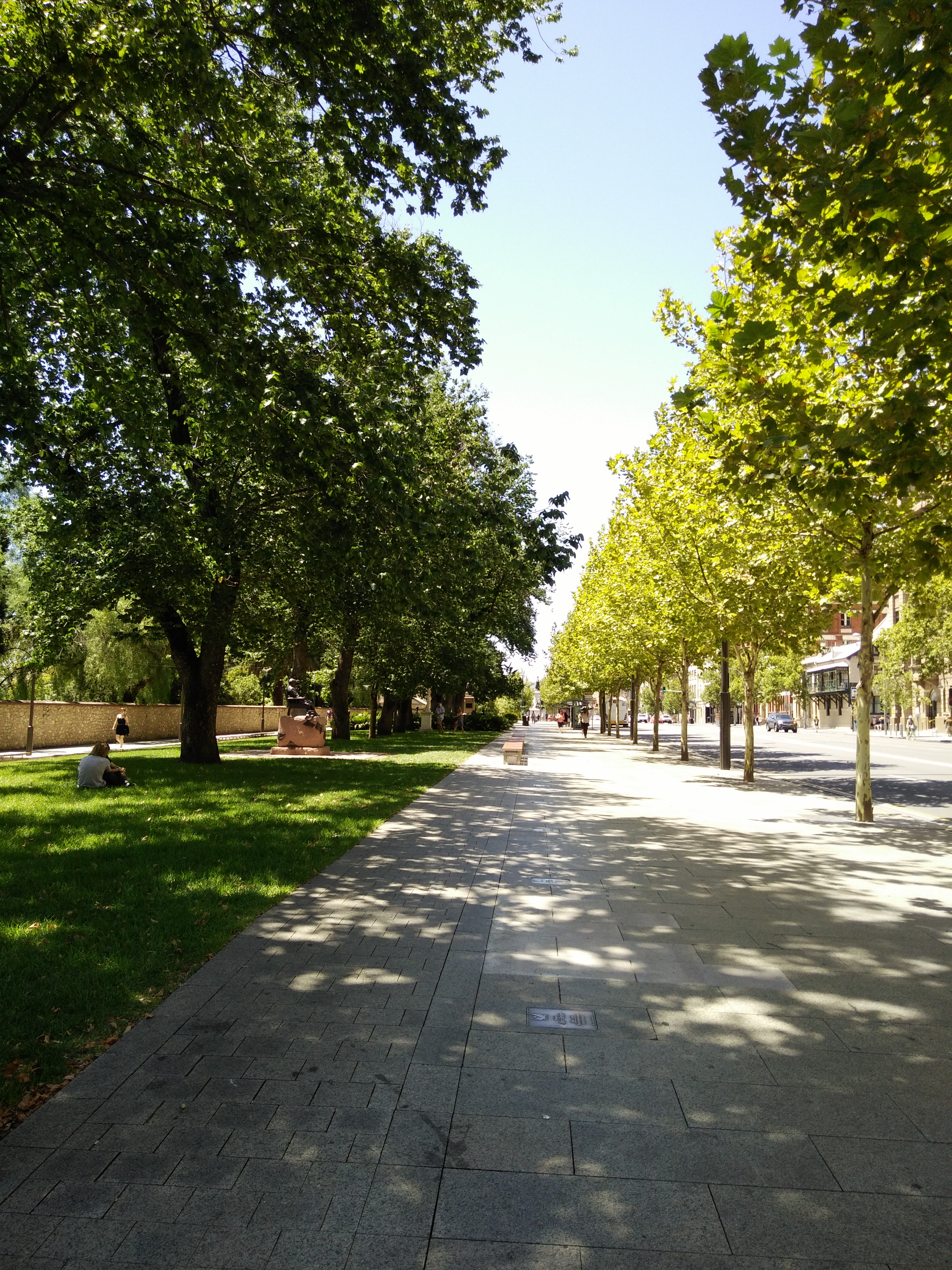
Looking east from near King William Road in 2017

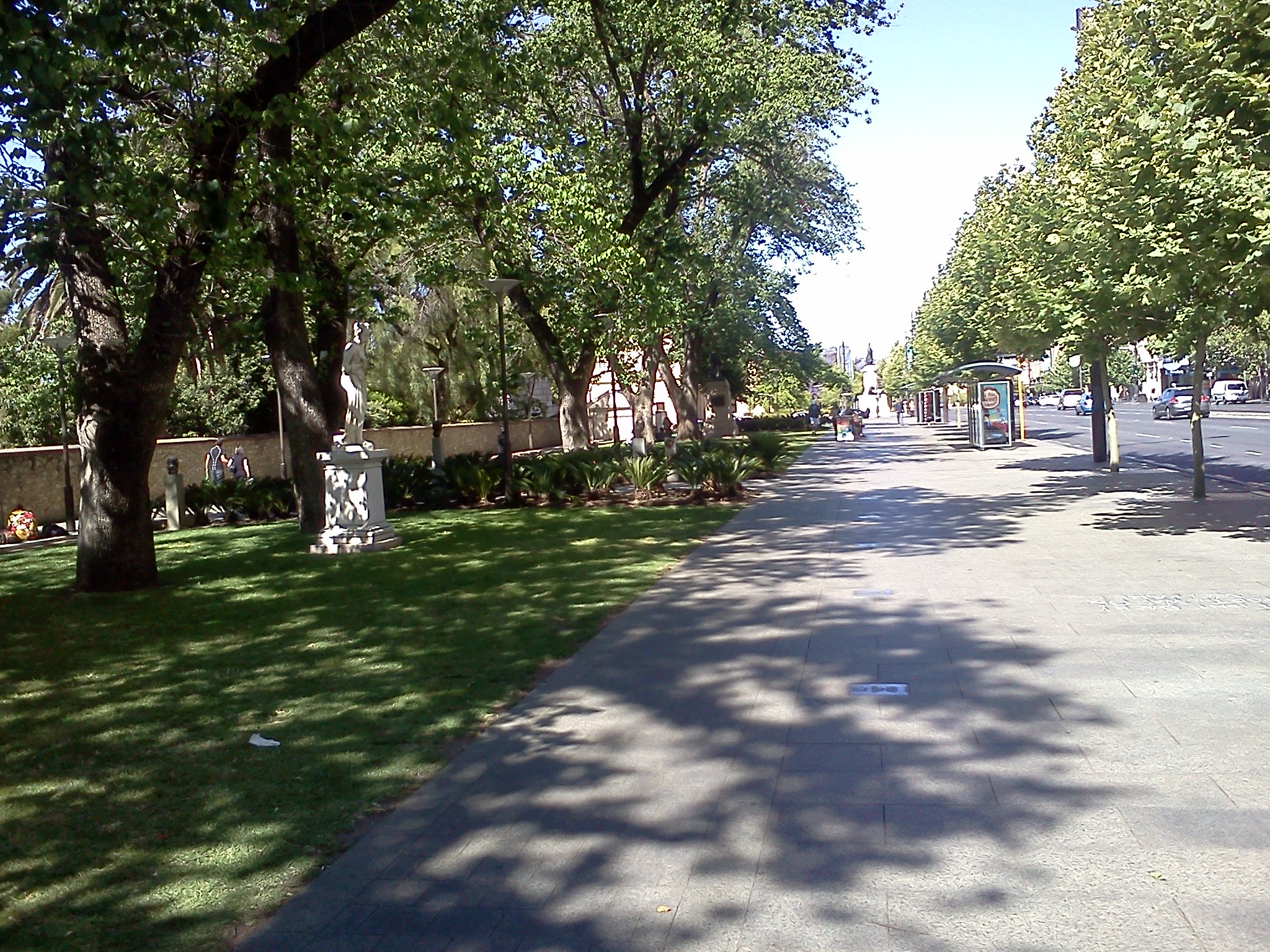
Looking east from near the statue of Dame Roma Mitchell in 2013

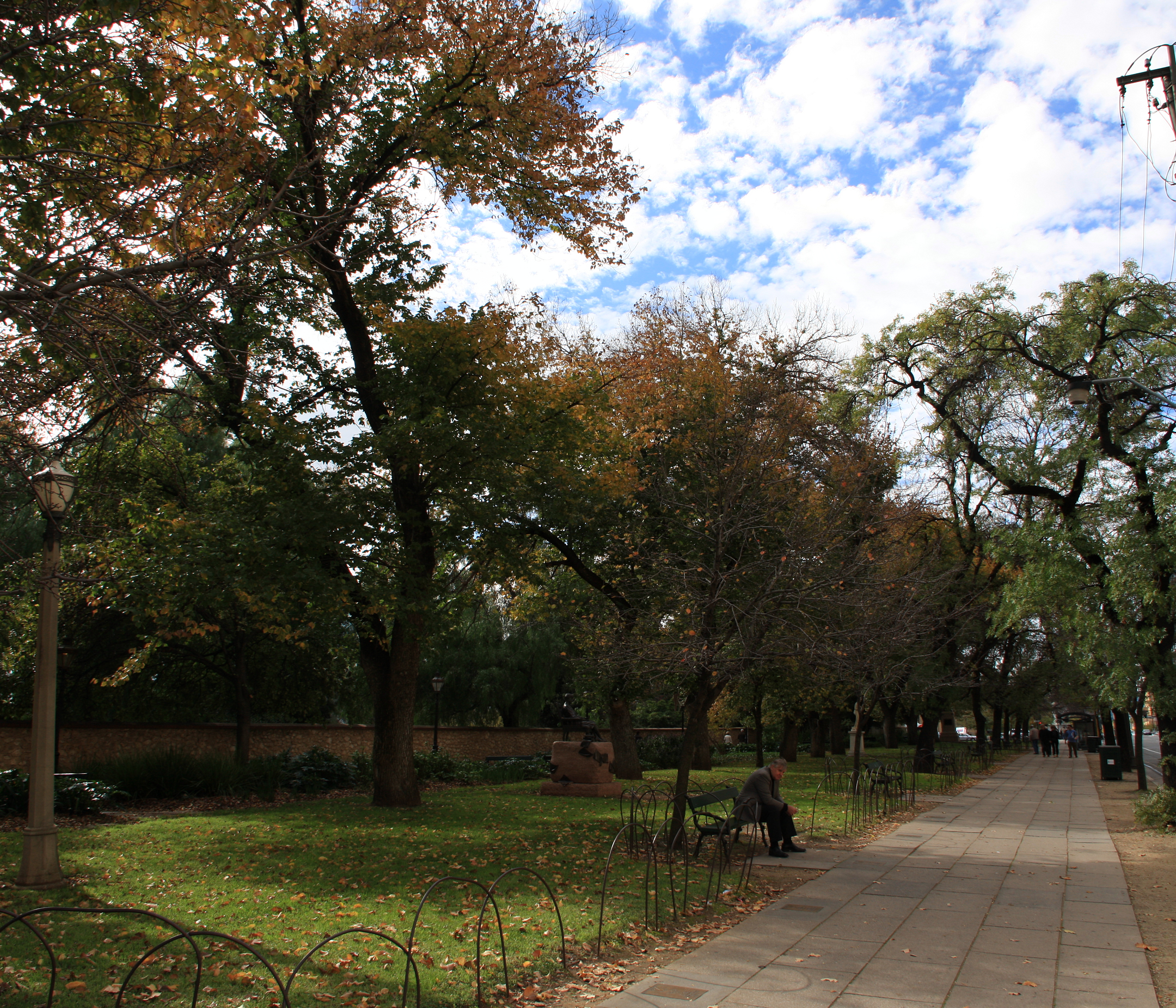
Looking east from near King William Road in 2009

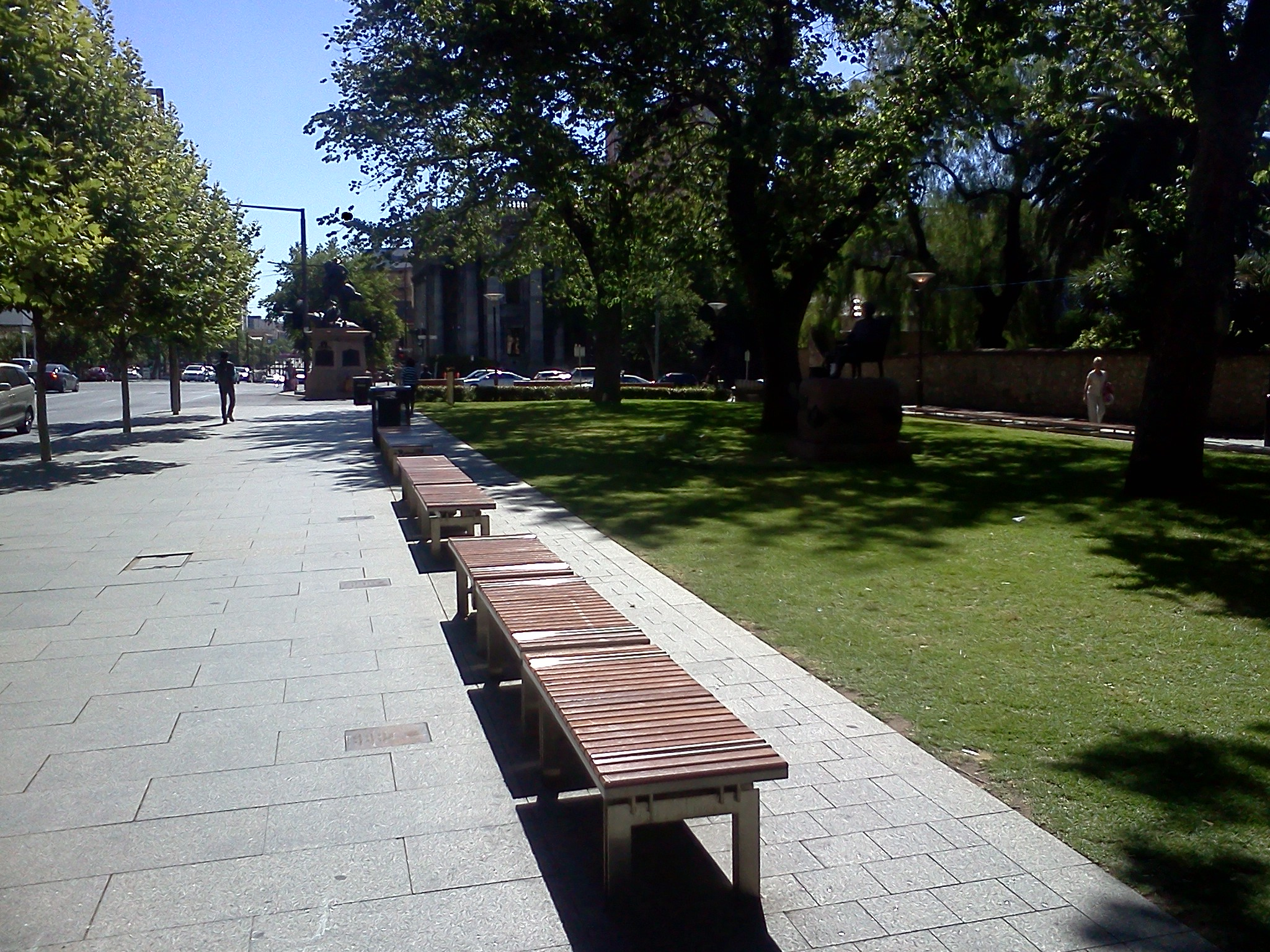
Looking west from near the statue of Dame Roma Mitchell back towards King William Road in 2013

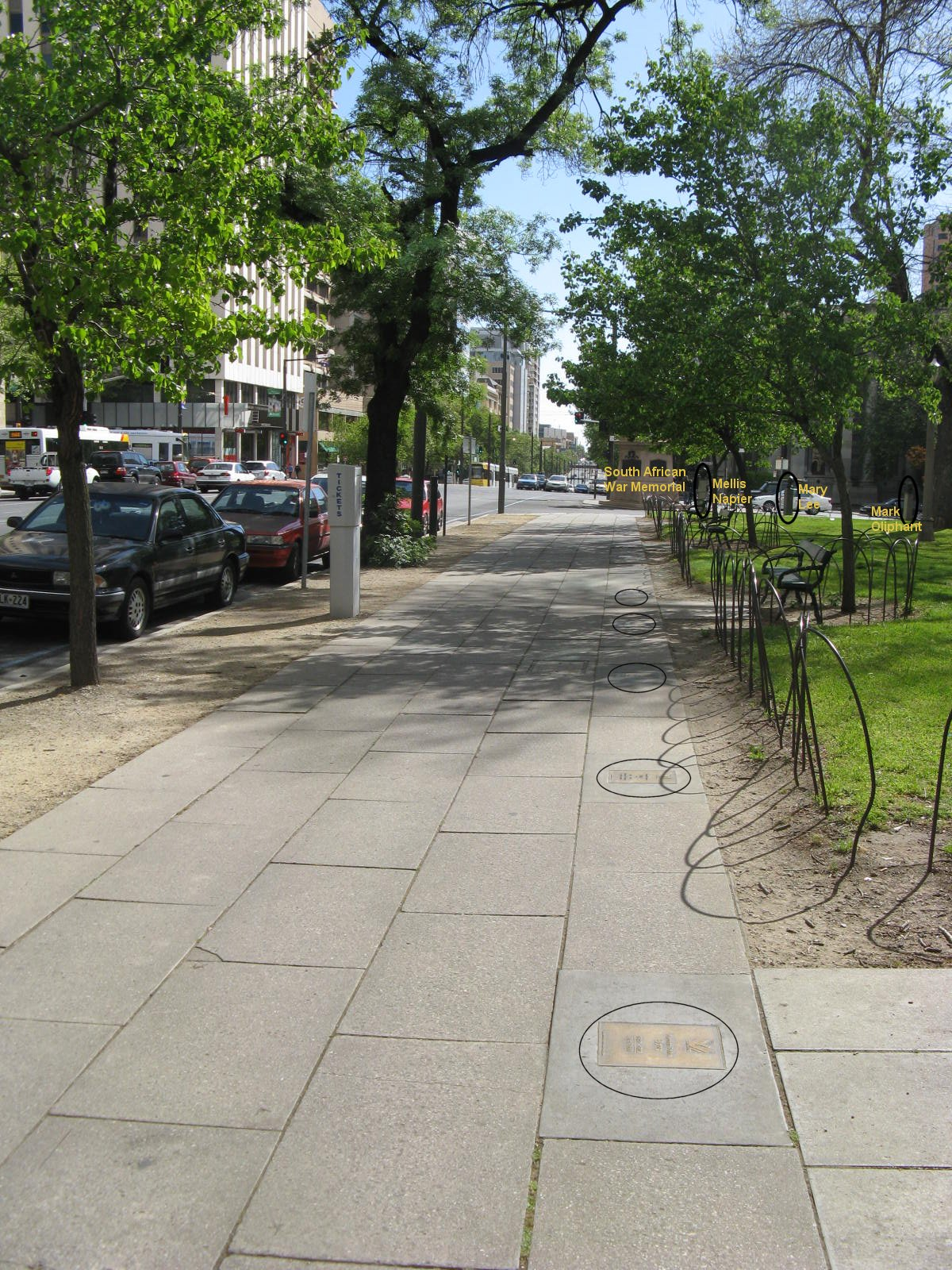
Looking west from the statue of Dame Roma Mitchell back towards King William Road in 2009

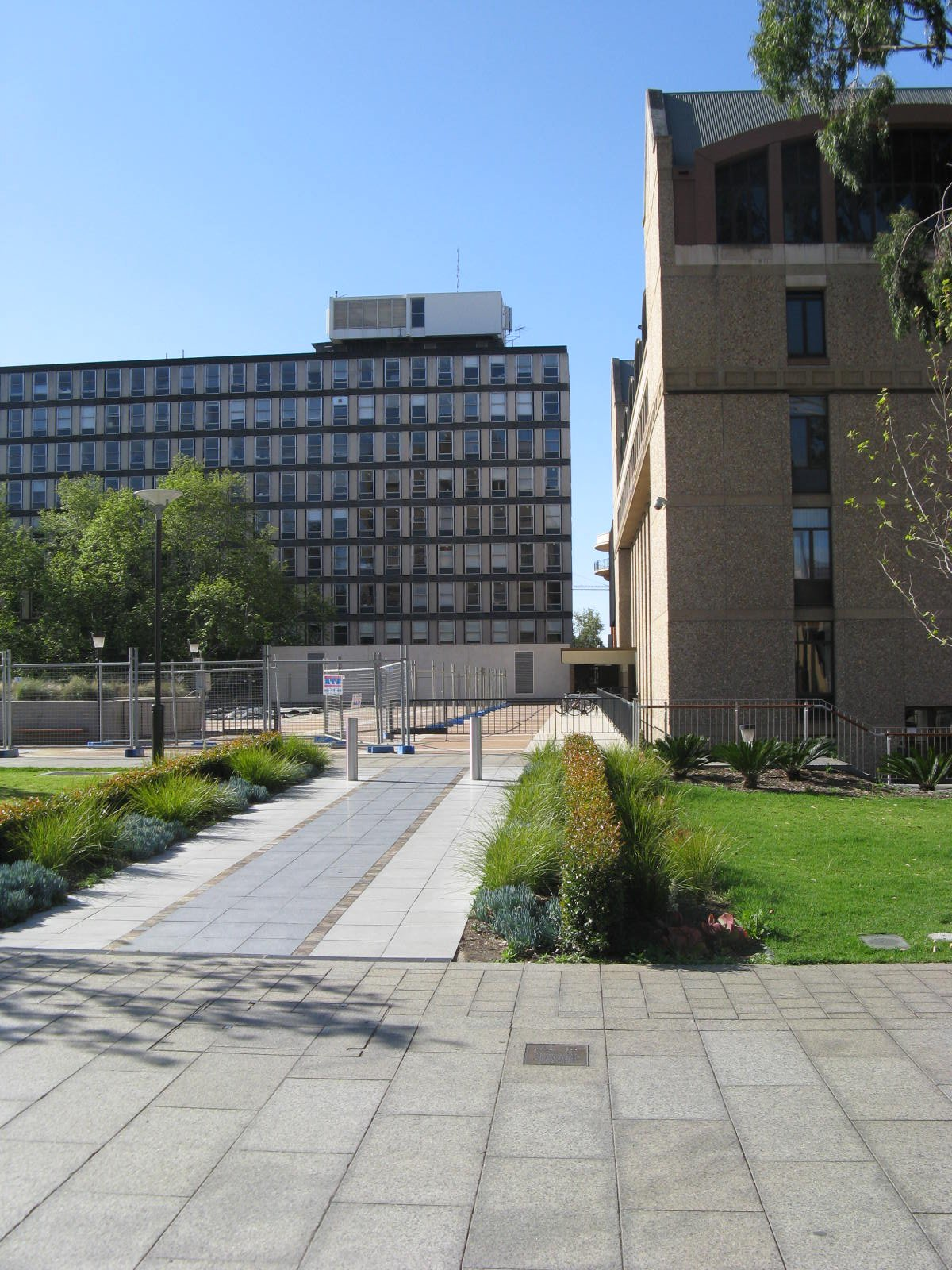
Napier and Ligertwood buildings, with last plaque in foreground.
