= Adolf John Schulz =

Australian educator

- Born: August 6, 1883; Adelaide, South Australia
- Died: February 4, 1956 (aged 72); North Adelaide, Australia
- Education: University of Adelaide (BA, MA); University of Zurich (PhD)
- Occupations: Educator; psychologist; college principal
- Employers: Adelaide Teachers College; University of Adelaide
- Known for: Longest-serving principal of Adelaide Teachers College (1909–1948)

Adolf John Schulz (6 August 1883 – 5 February 1956) was an educator in Adelaide, South Australia, the first Principal of the Adelaide Teachers' College.

== History ==
Schulz was born in Stepney, South Australia, a son of (Johann Karl) Heinrich Schulz (c. 1848 – 5 December 1926) and his wife Marie Amelia Schulz, née Bagung (died 25 August 1935). He was educated at some private institution as well as Flinders Street and Rose Park State schools and at age 15 entered the Pupil Teachers School in Grote Street. He entered University Training College, founded in 1900, under superintendent Andrew Scott BA (died 1906), winning several scholarships. In 1904 he entered Adelaide University, graduated BA, then in 1904 was appointed assistant teacher at the University Training College.

The career of a prospective teacher in the early 1900s consisted of three stages: two years at the Pupil Teaching School, where trainees were instructed in subjects to be taught, two years as teachers' assistants, then two years at the Training College before being eligible for appointment as a teacher. A modest subsistence allowance was paid, increasing each of the six years, tuition free and travel allowance paid to country students.

In 1905 he was granted two years' study leave which he used to attend the University of Zurich, graduating PhD magna cum laude in 1908.

Scott died in 1907 and was succeeded on a temporary basis by William Charles McCarthy. Schulz was appointed to the position in December 1909.

The teacher training system underwent a reorganization in 1910, and another in 1921 with the establishment of the Teachers' College with Schulz as principal. A new building for the Teachers' College on Kintore Avenue was designed by architect Alfred Edward Simpson, for which the foundation stone was laid by the Minister for Education, L. L. Hill in 1925. The completed first stage of the two-storey quadrangular building was opened in 1927 by Hill, by that time Premier as well as education minister.

Schulz served as head of Adelaide Teachers' College until 1948, when he retired.

== Recognition ==
Schulz was elected foundation president of the South Australian Institute of Educational Research.

The "skyscraper" Schulz building, on the University grounds adjacent the Hartley building, was named in his honour.

He was recognised in 1986 by a plaque on the Jubilee 150 Walkway, North Terrace, Adelaide.
