= Mount Barker Waldorf School =

Independent school in South Australia

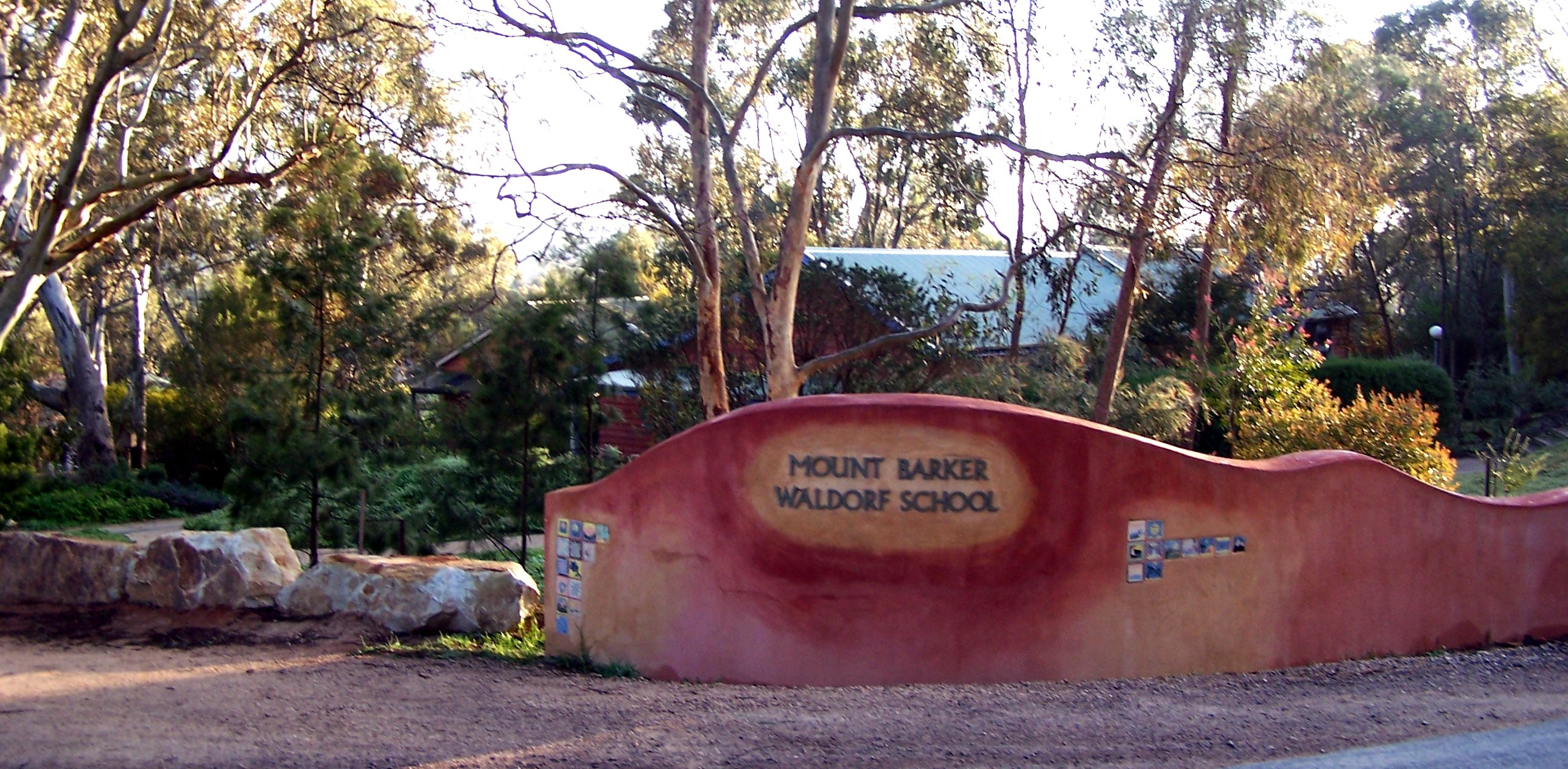

Location
- Mount Barker, South Australia; Australia; 35.0824°S 138.8782°E

Information
- Type: Independent/Waldorf education
- Established: 1979
- Enrolment: 340
- Classes: K–12
- Campus: City
- Website: http://www.mtbarkerwaldorf.sa.edu.au/

Mount Barker Waldorf School is an independent, co-educational, Steiner school in the Adelaide Hills town of Mount Barker, South Australia. It is administered by the Association of Independent Schools of South Australia, with an enrolment of 306 students and a teaching staff of 40 as of 2024. The school serves students from Reception to Year 12 and was founded in 1979. It follows the education philosophies of Rudolf Steiner.

== Events ==
The Mount Barker Waldorf School holds many annual events. The main event the school holds is the Spring Fair, a fair presenting the work of the students, hosting family friendly activities, and offering a venue for vendors and small businesses to set up stalls.

The school also holds a variety of seasonal festivals. The winter lantern festival is open for all parents to come and watch the lantern walk held by the primary school. Other events include the autumn harvest festival and the spring equinox festival, both also open to parents.

== See also ==
- Education in the Australian Capital Territory
- List of schools in the Australian Capital Territory
