= Mount Barker High School =

Coordinates: 35°04′30″S 138°51′27″E

- Mount Barker, South Australia; Australia

Information
- Type: Public
- Motto: Non nobis solum (Not For Ourselves Alone)
- Established: 1908
- Principal: David Garrett
- Enrolment: 725
- Classes: 7–12
- Colours: Navy blue, white, mid grey
- Website: http://www.mtbhs.sa.edu.au/

Mount Barker High School is a public high school located in the Adelaide Hills, 34 kilometres east of Adelaide, South Australia. It was founded in 1908, celebrating its centenary in 2008.

== Positive psychology ==
In partnership with St Peter's College, Mount Barker High School is piloting Martin Seligman's positive psychology theories in education. The positive psychology framework is based around the PERMA framework, which requires only saying things in the positive, rather than the negative. Methods include peer mentoring and open opportunities to work on "open mindsets".
