= Yvonne Aitken =

Australian agricultural scientist (1911–2004)

Yvonne Aitken AM
- Born: October 17, 1911
- Died: November 29, 2004 (aged 93)
- Education: University of Melbourne
- Known for: Agricultural science
- Scientific career
- Workplaces: University of Melbourne

Yvonne Aitken AM (17 October 1911 – 29 November 2004) was an Australian agricultural scientist whose contributions to the field included studies of plant flowering as it depends on climate, season, and genetic factors. She was appointed as a Member of the Order of Australia in 1989.

Aitken's primary goal was to produce a greater range of consumable crops. By comparing flowering data for particular plant varieties across various latitudes, and under laboratory conditions, Aitken deduced fundamental factors that governed the transition of plants from the vegetative to reproductive states. In general, those plants flowering earliest under given conditions had the least dependence on climate whereas later-flowering varieties reacted strongly to the climate setup.

== Background and personal life ==
Aitken was born on 17 October 1911 in Horsham, Victoria to David Aitken and Arabella Miller. She was the eldest of two children. Aitken was educated at the Convents of Mercy in the town in which her father worked as a bank manager. Her mother worked as a school teacher. While the Convents of Mercy did not provide education in the sciences, she attended the renowned Sacred Heart College in Ballarat, on scholarship, for the last two years of secondary education. Aitken later received a scholarship called a Government Free Place that would enable her to attend the University of Melbourne to study agricultural sciences, despite financial pressures of the Great Depression at the time. Without prior background in the sciences or farming, agricultural science was a subject suggested by younger nuns who were beginning to learn about geology and botany at the School of Mines in Ballarat.

Despite the immense amount of time Aitken spent dedicated to her research, she enjoyed weaving and painting watercolours of the places that she visited for work over the years. She never married or had children.

== Education and career ==
Aitken spent many years at the University of Melbourne, as a student, a lecturer, and a researcher.

In 1930 Aitken entered into residence at Janet Clarke Hall, the women's hostel of Trinity College, University of Melbourne while studying her Bachelors of Agricultural Science (BAgSc) degree, which she received in 1936. During these years, she was introduced to physics, zoology, chemistry, and botany for the first time. At the end of her second year of undergraduate studies, she was interrupted by an illness that forced her to return home. Her mother cared for her for two years before she returned to finish her degree. She continued with her Government Free Place scholarship, and found herself one of two women in the entire agricultural science class.

When Aitken first began her studies at the University of Melbourne, she met the head of Faculty of Agriculture, Professor Wadham. While she was recovering from her illness, Wadham suggested that she study the native grasses in the rural area surrounding St. Arnaud. After receiving her degree, Aitken wanted further scientific training. While contemplating her graduate field of study, Wadham proposed that she go to Burnley Gardens to help with the investigation of subterranean clover.

She worked with Jim Harrison, another Melbourne graduate, who had been working on collecting samples of subterranean clover and studying its natural variation in growing season for seven years prior. Through two sets of extensive experiments, including a four-year time-of-sowing experiment, they were able to conclude that flowering time was controlled by response to hours of daylight and temperature change. This got Aitken primarily interested in her life's work.

She received her Master of Agricultural Science (MAgSc) degree from the University of Melbourne in 1939, with the side-project she submitted, stemming from her time at Burnley Gardens on seed hardness of subterranean clover. Around the same time, in 1938, Aitken began a research project that aimed to halt and reverse wheat crop decline by introducing crop legumes, like field pea, to return nitrogen to the soil.

Aitken took some time off from her education to work as a lecturer at the University of Melbourne (1945–1957). Aitken was promoted to the position of Senior Lecturer in 1957. She held this position until 1974 when she stepped down to pursue research and other career options.

In 1970, Aitken received her Doctor of Agricultural Science (DAgSc) degree from the University of Melbourne, as result of her extensive work on flowering behavior over the course of 30 years. She collected data on the effect of temperature and photoperiod using varieties of nine different field crops, including pea, sown in Australia and in a multitude of diverse climates worldwide, including Central Asia, Patagonia, Peru, Alaska, California, Oregon, Hawaii, and Mexico. She was the first woman to receive this honor.

After retiring, Aitken continued to work in the plant sciences for 19 years, aiming to breed new varieties of maize for different climate ranges.

== Publications ==
Aitken is responsible for several publications in regards to agriculture; she wrote forty research papers and multiple peer reviews during her lifetime. In addition to her academic articles, Aitken coauthored a textbook titled Agricultural Science - An Introduction for Australian Students and Farmers which was published in 1962.

=== List of major publications ===
Year	Title	Publisher
1974	Flowering time, climate and genotype : the adaptation of agricultural species to climate through flowering responses	Melbourne University Press
1962	Agricultural Science - An Introduction for Australian Students and Farmers	
1985	Handbook of Flowering. Vol 1	CRC Press

== Honours and awards ==
In 1989, Aitken was appointed Member of the Order of Australia (AM). This organization's goal is to recognize Australian citizens that make extraordinary contributions to society on the national and international level. There are multiple levels of membership of the Order of Australia. Aitken was appointed a Member of the Order of Australia due to her 'service in a particular locality or field of activity or to a particular group' as a general citizen. Aitken was nominated for her notable contributions to the scientific community in regards to the genetics of plants and her service to the community as an educator.

On 10 October 2002, Aitken was inducted as Fellow of the Royal Society of Victoria (RFSV).

== Legacy — Yvonne Aitken Scholarship ==
Aitken joined the Victorian Graduate Women Association in 1937 after she received her undergraduate degree, she was a member for 74 years. The association was founded in 1920 with the goal to empower women through education. The association changed its name to Graduate Women Victoria in the 60s.

When Aitken died on 29 November 2004, she left a substantial gift to the association for their scholarship program. The Graduate Women Victoria association established the Yvonne Aitken Scholarship in 2008. The Scholarship is gifted to a female student enrolled in a graduate program at a college of the student's choice in Victoria, Australia.
