= Mount Barker, South Australia =

Mount Barker
- City
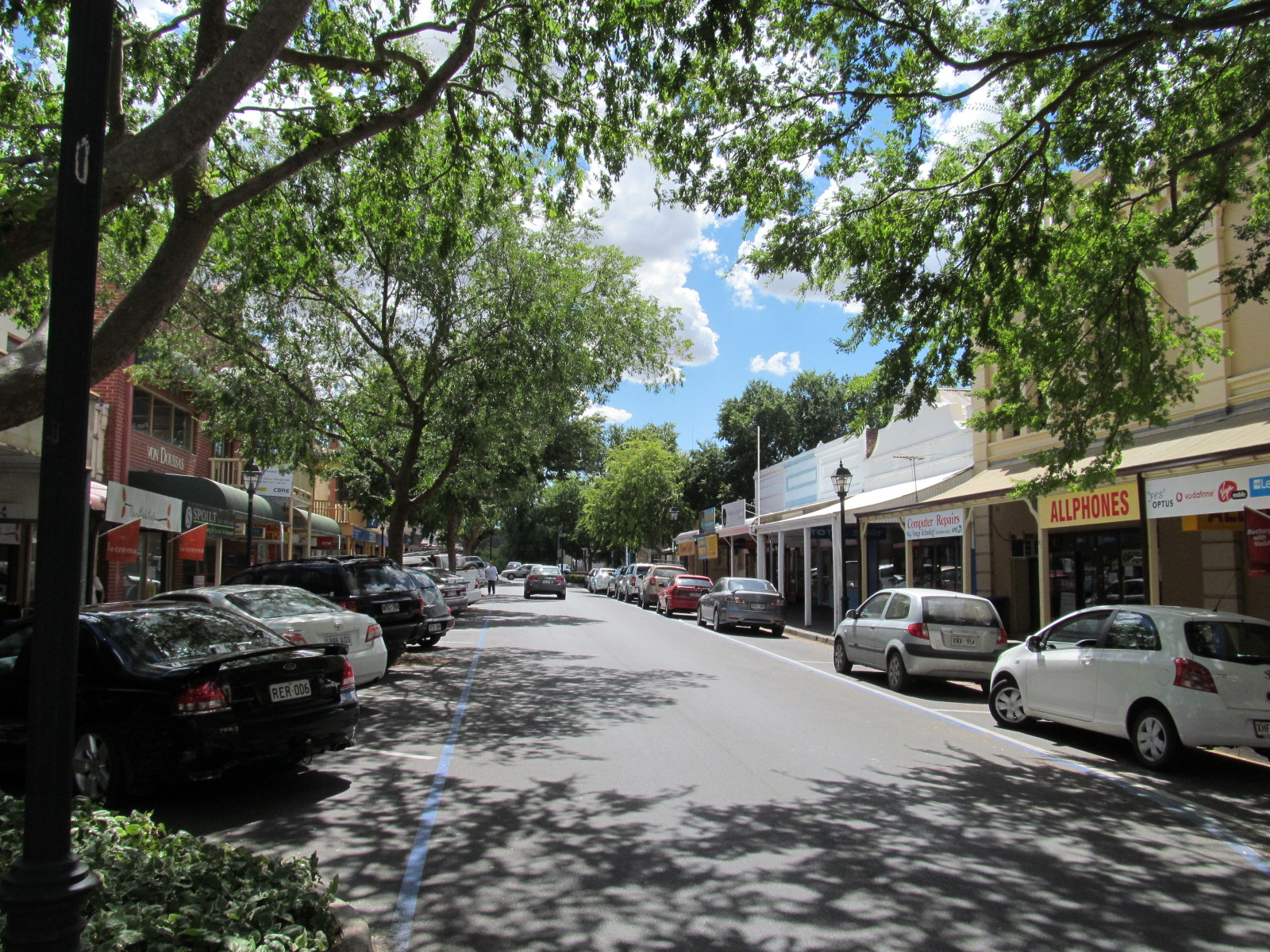
- Gawler Street, Mount Barker

- Interactive map of Mount Barker
- Coordinates: 35°04′S 138°51′E
- Country: Australia
- State: South Australia
- Region: Adelaide Hills
- LGA: Mount Barker
- Location: 33 km (21 mi) from Adelaide
- Established: 1839

Government
  - State electorate: Kavel
  - Federal division: Mayo

Area
  - Total: 37.9 km^{2} (14.6 sq mi)
- Elevation: 360 m (1,180 ft)

Population
  - Totals: 25,026 (2021 (Census)) (74th (2021)); 46,000 (2025 Estimate)
  - Density: 221.9/km^{2} (575/sq mi)
- Time zone: ACST
  - Summer (DST): ACDT
- Postcode: 5251
- Mean max temp: 20.0 °C (68.0 °F)
- Mean min temp: 8.0 °C (46.4 °F)
- Annual rainfall: 766.8 mm (30.19 in)
Localities around Mount Barker
Hahndorf, Paechtown	Totness, Littlehampton, Blakiston	Nairne
Echunga	Mount Barker	Mount Barker Summit, Mount Barker Springs
Macclesfield	Bugle Ranges	Wistow

Mount Barker is a city in South Australia. Located approximately 33 kilometres (21 miles) from the Adelaide city centre, it is home to 25,026 residents (2021). It is the seat of the District Council of Mount Barker, the largest town in the Adelaide Hills. It is part of Greater Adelaide, alongside being one of the fastest-growing areas in the state.

Mount Barker lies at the base of a local eponymous peak called the Mount Barker summit. It is 50 kilometres from the Murray River. Mount Barker was traditionally a farming area. Many of the lots just outside the town area are farming lots, although some of them have been replaced with new subdivisions in recent times.

== History ==
Mount Barker, the mountain, was sighted by Captain Charles Sturt in 1830, although he thought he was looking at the previously discovered Mount Lofty. This sighting of Mount Barker was the first by a European. Captain Collet Barker corrected Sturt's error when he surveyed the area in 1831. Sturt named the mountain in honour of Captain Barker after he was killed later that year by local Aboriginal people at the Murray Mouth. The mountain was officially recognised by King William IV in 1834, two years before the colonisation of South Australia in 1836.

The first Europeans to ascend the mountain, on 27 November 1837, were a six-man party comprising John Barton Hack, John Morphett, Samuel Stephens, Charles Stuart (South Australian Company's stock overseer), Thomas Davis (Hack's stockman), and John Wade (a "gentleman from Hobart Town"). Four weeks later, on 25 December 1837, four colonists, Robert Cock, William Finlayson, A. Wyatt, and G. Barton, left Adelaide to examine the country south east of Adelaide toward Lake Alexandrina. Along the route, they also ascended the mount.

Mount Barker was originally home to the Peramangk Aboriginal people. The Ngarrindjeri people from the east also used the Summit for ceremonial and burial sites. The Mount Barker Summit is a significant Aboriginal area, and may be one of the most sacred sites near Adelaide. In 1984 the Ngarrindjeri people tried to prevent the building of a police communications tower, and in 1987 they also tried to stop the Telecom tower, although both attempts were not successful.

=== Founding and growth ===
Mount Barker township was surveyed in 1839 by Duncan McFarlane, who was hoping the area could be used for wheat and grain farming. The land was divided into lots of 80 acres (32 ha), although farmers didn't settle until 1844, when John Dunn built the first steam flour mill outside of Adelaide. The flour mill ran for 50 years and is now a tourist attraction. All of the towns major buildings were built soon afterwards, with a post office (now replaced) in 1860 and a police station (also replaced) that was built in 1878. In 1883, the railway line from Adelaide to Strathalbyn was laid, but that line is now discontinued, with the line terminating short of Balhannah, and is used by the SteamRanger Heritage Railway.

Mount Barker has since developed into a large urban centre, which is developing very rapidly. The Mount Barker district council is the area that experienced the fourth largest growth between 1996 and 2006 in South Australia, with an increase of 3,800 new residents (3% growth per year). Mount Barker is ranked fifth for fastest growth in South Australia. During the last 10 years, many new subdivisions have been developed, such as Martin-Dale and Waterford. During this period, there has been an economic boom in Mount Barker and a number of additional malls and shopping centres, such as the Adelaide Hills Home-maker Centre, with retailers and the new offices for the District Council of Mount Barker. There have also recently been lodged plans for a new shopping centre, which will feature a major department store larger than 4,000 m ^{2}.

=== The discovery of clover ===
Mount Barker is famous as the place where the value of subterranean clover, Trifolium subterraneum, as a fodder crop was discovered, proved and first promoted by A. W. Howard. His property stood at the south-east corner of Princes Highway and Bald Hills Road. Subterranean clover had been known for a very long time in Central and Southern Europe, but was looked upon as a roadside weed. Howard proved that clover was a valuable fodder plant in some soil types in temperate climates. Subterranean clover revolutionised farming practices, converting many struggling farms into successful livestock holdings.

The discovery spread across Australia and to many other countries, due largely to Howard's generosity in publishing articles about clover, supplying seed free of charge around the world, and advising on handling. By the time of his death (2 March 1930), thousands of hectares in South Australia were carrying subterranean clover. It was growing in all Australian states, and requests for seed and information were being received in great numbers from almost all countries in the world with a temperate climate.

Howard's work is commemorated by a roadside plaque, by the incorporation of a clover leaf into the arms of the District Council of Mount Barker, and by the Howard's End vineyard and winery on the same site.

=== Rezoning controversy ===
Mount Barker showing roads and land use. Blue:Residential upper right: farmland rezoned to residential in 2010. Orange:CBD Green:Industry

In 2003, largely due to concerns that Adelaide's urban sprawl was encroaching onto surrounding farmlands, the then State Planning Minister Jay Weatherill made a commitment to contain the expansion of Mount Barker.

In 2008 a consortium of five developers sought the rezoning of 1,300 hectares (3,200 acres) of prime agricultural land in order to build an additional 7,700 new homes which would increase the population of Mount Barker from 10,258 to around 35,000. The land included 40 hectares (99 acres) rezoned to light industry in order to provide jobs for the new population. The plan was rejected by the Mount Barker Council as it had just completed a 15-year development plan for the area that would retain the town's "rural character" and it could not afford the required infrastructure, a decision supported by a survey indicating that the rezoning was opposed by 98% of residents.

In April 2009, the developers approached Paul Holloway, the State Planning Minister, to override the council decision, arguing that the land had "no outstanding attributes except for its suitability for urban development." In May 2009, the Minister announced that his office would go ahead and bypass the council. The following month Mark Parnell, the SA Greens representative in the South Australian Legislative Council made a request under the Freedom of Information Act 1991 for copies of documents passed between the developers and State Government.

In December 2010, the State Government approved the rezoning, and development and construction began without the usual council infrastructure. However, the state Government agreed to a $550 million infrastructure support package. The rezoning included amending the area's bushfire risk level from high risk to only a general risk. The council expressed concern that the reduction of the threat level would lead to a reduction of building standards compared to those standards required for homes in high risk areas and pointed out that the previous year, Victoria's Black Saturday bushfires Royal Commission had recommended that there should be less building in bushfire-prone areas.

The FOI documents, released in February 2012, indicated conflict of interest and poor planning practices. One document revealed that the Minister had ignored Planning SA's request not to make any commitments to the developers before the state's own 30-year plan was completed. South Australia's Planning Minister John Rau (2010–present) said that the Government should not have approved the rezoning of land without the government and council being able to support that community with infrastructure. The Government has since announced it will reform the state's planning process, calling it "dishevelled, disjointed and inconsistent". A new interchange on the South Eastern Freeway at Bald Hills Road has been built to improve travel times and road safety for commuters travelling to the east side of Mount Barker and reduce traffic congestion in Mount Barker.

In March 2013, the State Ombudsman, Richard Bingham, handed down a report into a possible conflict of interest. The report found that the property consulting firm Connor Holmes "had a clear conflict of interest" that was known to Planning SA who took no action. Bingham suggested that the Independent Commission Against Corruption (ICAC) should investigate the Mount Barker development.

Connor Holmes was employed by the State Government to produce a Growth Investigations Report (GIA) as part of the state's 30-year plan. The GIA was to identify areas suitable for housing developments. At the time Connor Holmes was bidding for the GIA contract it was also acting as a consultant for the five developers and was actively lobbying the State Planning Minister Paul Holloway to support the Mount Barker development on their clients behalf. The Government has declined to release the GIA report but the Ombudsman's report noted that the urban boundaries proposed in the GIA were the same as those proposed by the five developers. On 6 March 2013, SA Greens MP Mark Parnell gave notice he would introduce a motion to the Legislative Council to refer the matter to ICAC.

The matter was investigated by the Independent Commission Against Corruption in 2013 with its findings published in June 2015. ICAC found no evidence of corruption.

== Governance ==
Mount Barker's local government is the District Council of Mount Barker. There are 11 council members.

Mount Barker's state electorates are Kavel and Heysen. Most of the town is in Kavel. The south-eastern portion of Mount Barker is in Heysen.

Mount Barker is in the federal electorate of Mayo. The local Federal Member of Parliament is Rebekha Sharkie.

== Geography ==
Mount Barker is located on the plains surrounding the Mount Barker Summit, about 2 km west of the mountain, at 35°04′S 138°51′E. Mount Barker is south east of Mount Lofty and Adelaide. It is north of The Coorong, and the west of Murray Bridge. Mount Barker is at an elevation of 360 m.

The city is just south of the freeway from Adelaide to Murray Bridge and Melbourne. Its four major roads form a star that reaches out of the town. To the east of the town there is an industrial area and the Laratinga Wetlands. North of the wetlands there are the housing subdivisions Martindale, Waterford and Dalmeny Park. The wetland is fed by the Mount Barker Creek that goes from Keith Stephenson Park to the wetlands, next to the linear trail.

Mount Barker in South Australia is often confused with Mount Barker in Western Australia, especially when dealing with national telephone centres.

=== Climate ===
Mount Barker has a warm-summer mediterranean climate (Köppen climate classification: Csb), Trewartha: Csbk). It has warm, dry summers; mild, damp springs and dry autumns; and cool, wet winters. It is generally cooler and wetter than Adelaide. It has a mean maximum temperature of 20.0 °C (68.0 °F) degrees and a mean minimum temperature of 8.8 °C (47.8 °F) degrees. Winters are damp and chilly with cloud cover. When clear weather does occasionally occur in winter, night time temperatures can drop below 0 °C (32 °F).

Summers are warm, with temperatures in January regularly nudging 30 °C (86 °F) and one or two days each year over 40 °C (104 °F). Summer nights can still be cool. The average rainfall for the year is 737.2 millimetres (29.02 in), higher than Adelaide due to its elevation. Mount Barker is typically the driest during January, with an average of 23.4 mm (0.92 in) of rain. July is usually the wettest month, with an average rainfall of 113.3 mm (4.46 in).

Local average temperatures have been kept since 1862/63. Extreme temperature records are only found from 1957 onwards.

Climate data for Mount Barker (1991−2020, extremes 1957−2022, rainfall to 1861); 359 m AMSL; 35.07° S, 138.85° E
Month	Jan	Feb	Mar	Apr	May	Jun	Jul	Aug	Sep	Oct	Nov	Dec	Year
Record high °C (°F)	44.5 (112.1)	43.0 (109.4)	40.7 (105.3)	36.0 (96.8)	28.9 (84.0)	24.2 (75.6)	23.8 (74.8)	27.2 (81.0)	31.1 (88.0)	35.3 (95.5)	40.6 (105.1)	42.5 (108.5)	44.5 (112.1)
Mean daily maximum °C (°F)	28.1 (82.6)	27.9 (82.2)	25.2 (77.4)	21.4 (70.5)	17.2 (63.0)	14.3 (57.7)	13.7 (56.7)	14.8 (58.6)	17.4 (63.3)	20.5 (68.9)	23.6 (74.5)	25.8 (78.4)	20.8 (69.5)
Daily mean °C (°F)	20.5 (68.9)	20.3 (68.5)	18.1 (64.6)	15.2 (59.4)	12.4 (54.3)	10.1 (50.2)	9.5 (49.1)	10.1 (50.2)	12.0 (53.6)	14.2 (57.6)	16.7 (62.1)	18.6 (65.5)	14.8 (58.7)
Mean daily minimum °C (°F)	12.9 (55.2)	12.7 (54.9)	11.0 (51.8)	9.0 (48.2)	7.5 (45.5)	5.9 (42.6)	5.3 (41.5)	5.4 (41.7)	6.6 (43.9)	7.9 (46.2)	9.8 (49.6)	11.3 (52.3)	8.8 (47.8)
Record low °C (°F)	2.6 (36.7)	3.3 (37.9)	1.7 (35.1)	−1.1 (30.0)	−3.7 (25.3)	−4.4 (24.1)	−5.6 (21.9)	−3.6 (25.5)	−1.8 (28.8)	−1.2 (29.8)	−1.1 (30.0)	1.7 (35.1)	−5.6 (21.9)
Average precipitation mm (inches)	23.4 (0.92)	25.8 (1.02)	27.6 (1.09)	46.3 (1.82)	76.1 (3.00)	101.0 (3.98)	113.3 (4.46)	103.3 (4.07)	86.7 (3.41)	52.6 (2.07)	39.7 (1.56)	40.3 (1.59)	737.2 (29.02)
Average precipitation days (≥ 0.2 mm)	6.6	6.1	8.0	10.6	14.7	16.6	17.5	17.1	15.0	12.1	9.7	9.0	143.0
Average afternoon relative humidity (%)	44	43	47	55	67	72	71	65	61	56	48	47	56
Average dew point °C (°F)	11.9 (53.4)	11.8 (53.2)	10.7 (51.3)	9.6 (49.3)	9.0 (48.2)	7.4 (45.3)	6.6 (43.9)	6.3 (43.3)	7.4 (45.3)	8.2 (46.8)	9.4 (48.9)	10.5 (50.9)	9.1 (48.3)
Source 1: Australian Bureau of Meteorology
Source 2: Australian Bureau of Meteorology (extremes to 1957, rainfall to 1861)

== Demographics ==
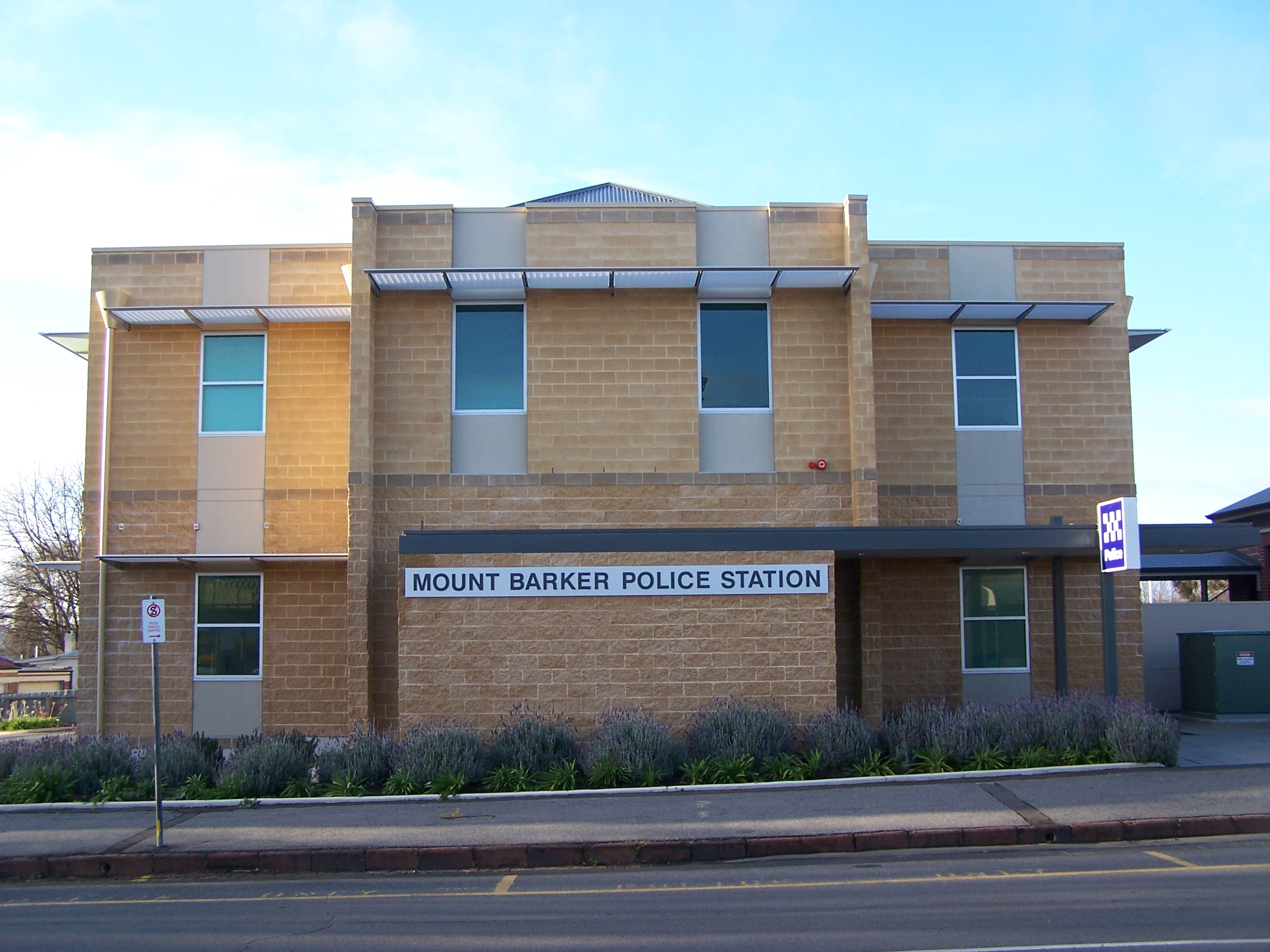
The 24-Hour Mount Barker police station

In 2021, Mount Barker was 51.8% female, and 48.2% male, compared with the national averages of 50.7% female and 49.3% male. Mount Barker had an average population age of 37, compared to the national average of 38. 47.4% of residents were married, compared to the national average of 46.5%.

In 2006, most people that lived in the city were born in Australia, with 8,274 people who live in Mount Barker born in Australia. Other common places of birth include England (682), Germany (87), Netherlands (79), New Zealand (78) and Scotland (75). Of the people living in Mount Barker, 9,426 of them speak only English at home (91.9%), 84 speak German, 67 Italian, 24 Dutch, 13 Afrikaans and 12 Indonesian.

In 2021, 80.1% of people in Mount Barker were born in Australia, compared to the national average of 66.9%. 90.1% of people from Mount Barker only speak English at home compared to the national average of 72.0%.

== Economy ==
Mount Barker has a growing economy with new shopping centres and other businesses, as well as a growing population. There are plans for another shopping centre and for Mount Barker Central to be expanded. There are several new housing developments in the city that are in the planning stage at the moment. The largest plan that is still awaiting a decision from the council is a new 1000 home subdivision in the town's south.

Tasmanian fishing and aquaculture company, Huon Aquaculture, operates its fish smoking factory in Mount Barker, which provides some employment to the town.

In 2021, the average income for residents of Mount Barker was $824 per week per person, $19 per week more than the national average.

== Culture and facilities ==
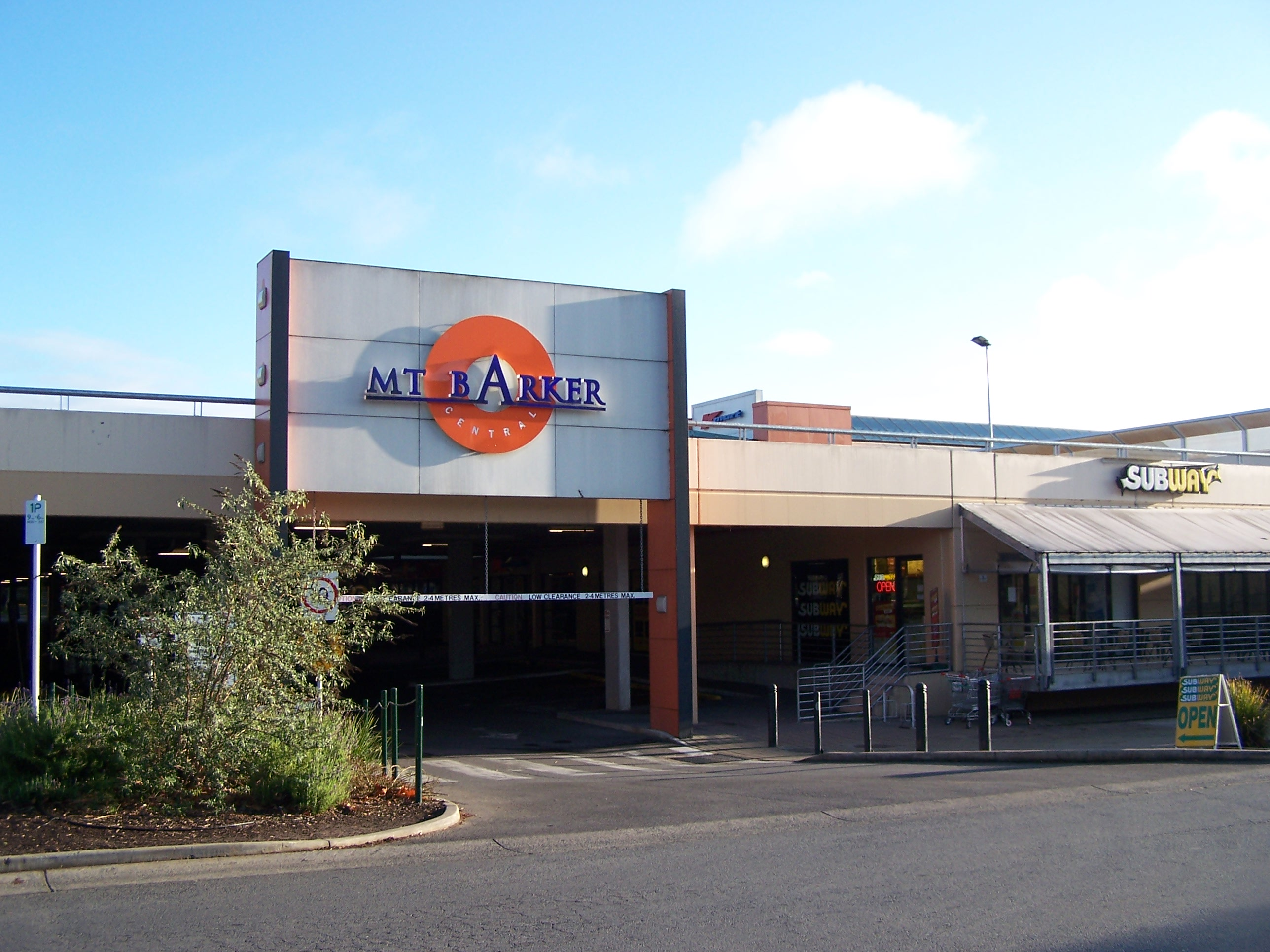
The south entrance to Mount Barker Central, the largest shopping centre in Mount Barker

Mount Barker is the largest town in the Adelaide Hills. It has seven shopping centres, six supermarkets, restaurants, cafés and fast food outlets. Mount Barker Central, also known as The Bilo Mall, is the largest and oldest, containing a Coles, a Kmart and more than 50 speciality shops. The original Bilo Mall was formerly the Mount Barker Tannery, which closed down in the early eighties.

Mount Barker Village is a smaller shopping centre based around the Foodland supermarket. In 2018 it was renovated, and now has several cafes and a butcher. Mount Barker Plaza, which used to house another Coles supermarket has recently been redeveloped, adding new stores such as Zambrero and National Pharmacies, with the main store being an Aldi supermarket. There is a Woolworths supermarket with a few small shops nearby.

The Adelaide Hills Homemaker Centre replaced some old industrial buildings, previously Jacobs Smallgoods and Abattoir, near the St Francis de Sales College. This industrial site was used as the meatworks in the movie The Honorable Wally Norman. A multi-storey office block houses the District Council of Mount Barker.

In 2023 the Aston Hills shopping center opened in the suburb of Aston Hills on the outskirts of Mount Barker, it is anchored by a Drakes supermarket furthermore in 2024 Woolworths Mount Barker South opened in a dedicated shopping center on the corner of Heysen Boulevard and the B37 road.

Our Lady of Mercy Church is part of the Mount Barker - Strathalbyn Catholic Parish.

=== Ukaria Cultural Centre ===
The Ukaria Cultural Centre, designed by architect Anton Johnson and built in 2015, is a leading venue for chamber music. Apart from its concert hall, it also has the Garden Terrace, which is a multi-purpose function space. The centre runs a residency program.

=== Local media ===
Mount Barker has an independent weekly local newspaper which serves many Hills towns, The Courier, published on Wednesdays. Founded in 1880, the paper has never missed a print run. It has been in the hands of the same family, the Marstons, since 1954. It has a circulation of 7,500 as of May 2020, down from 15,000 in its heyday in the 1970s and 1980s.

Three radio stations service Mount Barker: 5MU (94.3 MHz), Power FM (100.3 MHz), and Lofty 88.9 (88.9 MHz).

== Sport and recreation ==
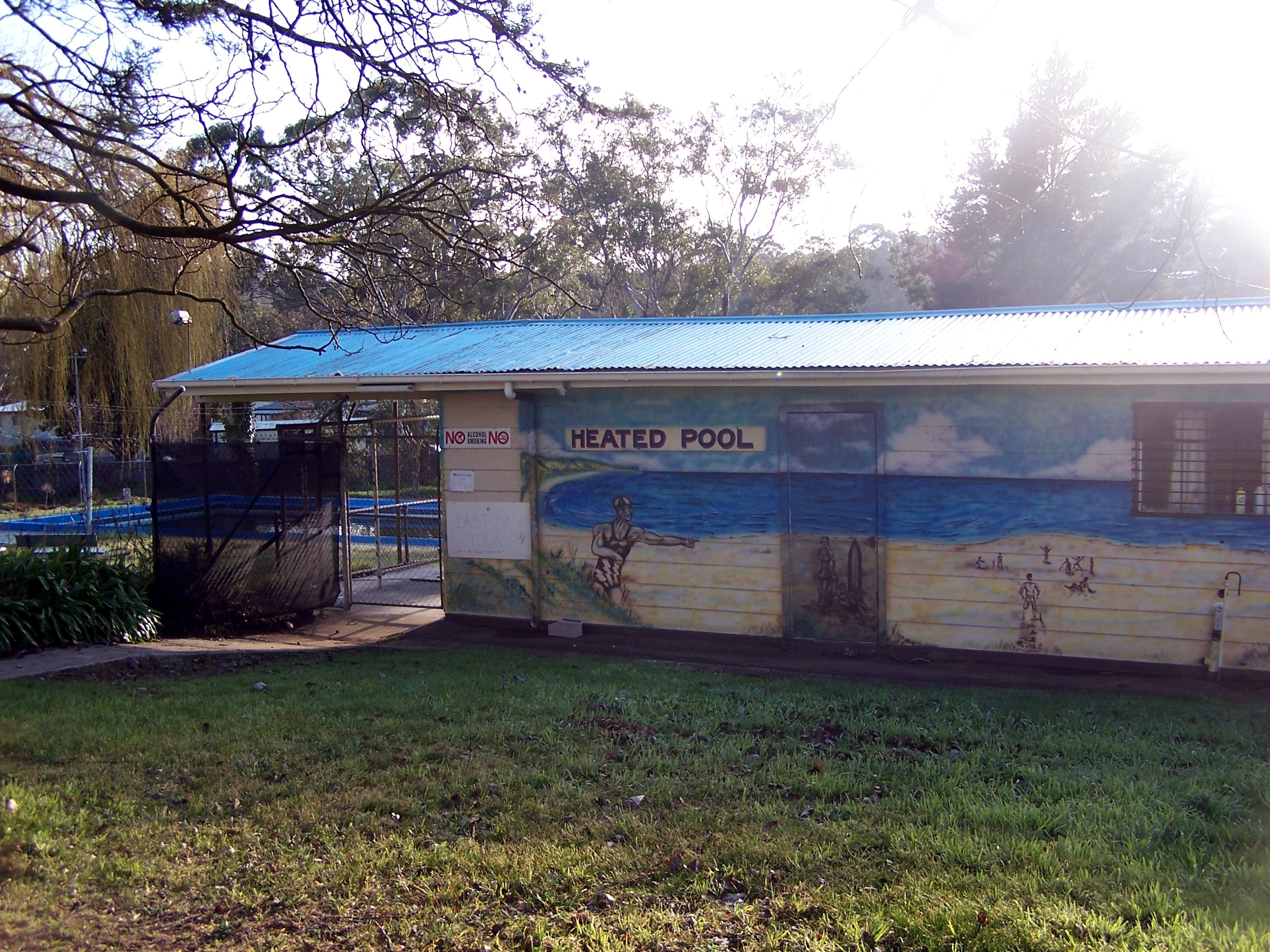
The Mount Barker Mountain Pool, next to the caravan park

Mount Barker has numerous activities that are available. The Keith Stephenson Park has the Linear Trail, a lake a playground and a skate park. The Mount Barker lawn bowls club is just across the road from Keith Stephenson Park. The linear trail goes to the Laratinga Wetlands, and is about 3km long. There are many walking trails and a few barbecues at the Laratinga Wetlands.

Just up the hill from Keith Stephenson Park is the Mount Barker Wallis Cinema. The cinema has seven screens, all with full Dolby Digital surround. The cinema is partially underground, with only about three rows of seats raised above ground level, and the rest is below. The cinema is right next to the Auchendarroch House restaurant.

Mount Barker has three ovals, the Mount Barker oval, right next to The Recreation Centre, where the Mount Barker Show is held, as well as local HFL footy matches, Dunn Park, which is located near Cornerstone College and the caravan park, although it is not used much any more and Summit Sport and Recreation Park; A large sports complex consisting of an AFL oval and grand stand and two soccer pitches and associated stands the main stand can hold approximately 250 persons and serves as also as a function center which can be hired by the general public. Summit Sports and Recreation Park is noted for having held several matches of the AFL "Gather Round" during the 2023 and 2024 seasons. The various schools in the area have their own ovals. Mount Barker has a public swimming pool, located near the caravan park, open from September to May.

Mount Barker has a single 18-hole, 5,614m golf course that is near the residential area on Bald Hills Road. The golf course is a par 70. Mount Barker is home to the SteamRanger Heritage Railway which operates The Southern Encounter steam trains through Strathalbyn and Goolwa to Victor Harbor.

Adjacent to the Summit Sports and Recreation Park will also be the Mount Barker Regional Indoor Aquatic & Leisure Centre which will include several large swimming pools and water slides with the aim being to provide a broader array of facilities for residents of Mt Barker as the current Mt Barker Mountain Pool is outdated and lacking in size for a city of Mt Barkers size.

Mount Barker has a rugby league team, the Adelaide Hills Tigers, who compete in the NRL South Australia Metro competition.

== Services ==
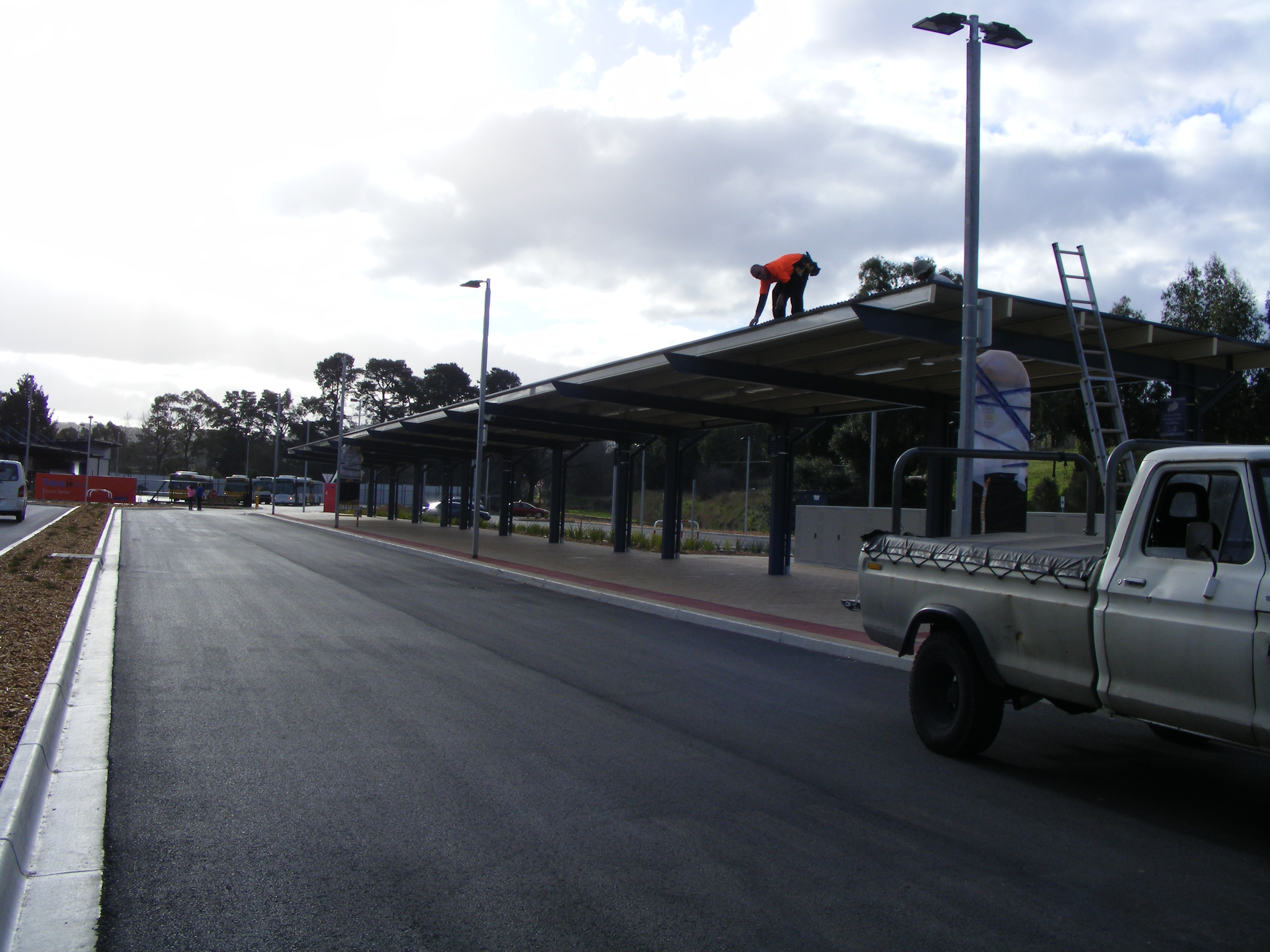
The Park 'n' Ride Facility in Mount Barker being completed

Mount Barker has many services. The Mount Barker Police station was recently upgraded and is now open 24 hours a day, as was the Country Fire Service station, which was one of the busiest in the state. Mount Barker has a library adjacent to the Mount Barker TAFE campus. Mount Barker also has a branch of the State Emergency Service which was one of the busiest in the state. Mount Barker Country Fire Service and State Emergency Service used to receive a substantial volume of callouts however that has decreased in recent years upon the opening of a retained Metropolitan Fire Service station in 2018-2019.

There is a post office that shared the same building as the doctors' centre, adjacent to the Mount Barker Central mall, but as of the last week in June 2017 has moved to the building directly behind McDonald's.

Mount Barker has an Ambulance Station and a hospital on Wellington Road. Mt Barker hospital recently completed an upgrade of its emergency department to better suit the growing population. In 2022 the South Australian Labor party pledged to expand the hospital, upon election funding was committed by the South Australian Labor Party and the hospital will undergo a substantial rebuild resulting in a multi story facility with a doubling of available bed space with a dedicated mental health wing also being on the agenda. Mount Barker also has an urgent care clinic by the name of Summit Health Center adjacent to its hospital for urgent albeit non life threatening injuries.

== Transport ==
=== Roads ===
The main route to Adelaide is via the South Eastern Freeway, which is used as a commuter road. The interchange at the western side of the town was built when the freeway was built in the 1970s. An additional interchange was opened in 2016 at the eastern side of the town.

=== Public transport ===
Adelaide Metro provides daily bus services from Mount Barker to Adelaide and back, via the surrounding hills districts such as Hahndorf and Stirling or an express route via the South Eastern Freeway. There are also buses to surrounding hills districts such as Lobethal, Nairne and Strathalbyn, as well as two loop buses. The local council also provides a to-your-door service for the elderly. Mount Barker also has a dial-a-ride system called Keolaride which provides on demand bus services within the metropolitan region of Mount Barker.

All Mount Barker buses and the Strathalbyn buses connect at the Mount Barker Park 'n' Ride. The facility was opened in July 2008. It has 183 car parks, security lighting, bike storage and a large sheltered waiting area.

=== Rail ===
Mount Barker was connected to the broad gauge network via the Adelaide-Wolseley railway line. Regular passenger services ended in 1984. In 1989, a not-for-profit railway preservation organisation, SteamRanger, was established by the Australian Railway Historical Society to operate its heritage train tours from Adelaide to Victor Harbor through the station. Six years later, as part of the One Nation infrastructure program, the main line between Adelaide and Melbourne was converted to standard gauge, leaving Steamranger's depot at Dry Creek in metropolitan Adelaide isolated. As a result of rapid growth and traffic congestion on the South Eastern Freeway, sporadic calls have been made since the late 2010s to extend the former passenger rail service beyond Belair to Mount Barker. However, a 2022 government-sponsored report rejected the prospect of opening a train service, arguing that reliability and travel time would "not come close" to buses and cars.

== Education ==
Mount Barker has three primary schools: the Mount Barker South Primary School, Mount Barker Primary School, and St Marks Primary School, which is a Lutheran school. Both St Francis and Waldorf have a primary school as well as a high school, which share the same campus.

Mount Barker has a public high school, Mount Barker High School. There are three private high schools: Cornerstone College, which is run by the Lutheran Church of Australia, St Francis de Sales College, which is Catholic, and Mount Barker Waldorf School which employs Waldorf Education. All of these schools are co-educational. Overall about 1,500–2,000 students, from Mount Barker, as well as many of the surrounding towns, such as Nairne, Littlehampton and Strathalbyn, are serviced by these high schools.

== See also ==
- Danny Sveinson
