= Laratinga Wetlands =

Wetlands in South Australia

The Laratinga Wetlands, constructed in 1999, is a wetland located in Mount Barker, South Australia. It is named after the Aboriginal Peramangk peoples' name for the Mount Barker Creek, "Laratinga".

The wetlands occupy an area of 16.7 hectares (41 acres), of which 10.7 hectares (26 acres) is underwater.

== See also ==
35°04′17″S 138°53′12″E
