= Ben Dickinson =

Australian geologist

Sir Ben Dickinson FAusIMM

Director of Mines, South Australia
- In office 1948–1956

Deputy Director of Mines, South Australia
- In office 1942–1948

Personal details
- Born: Samuel Benson Dickinson; 1 February 1912 Hobart, Tasmania, Australia
- Died: 2 February 2000 (aged 88)

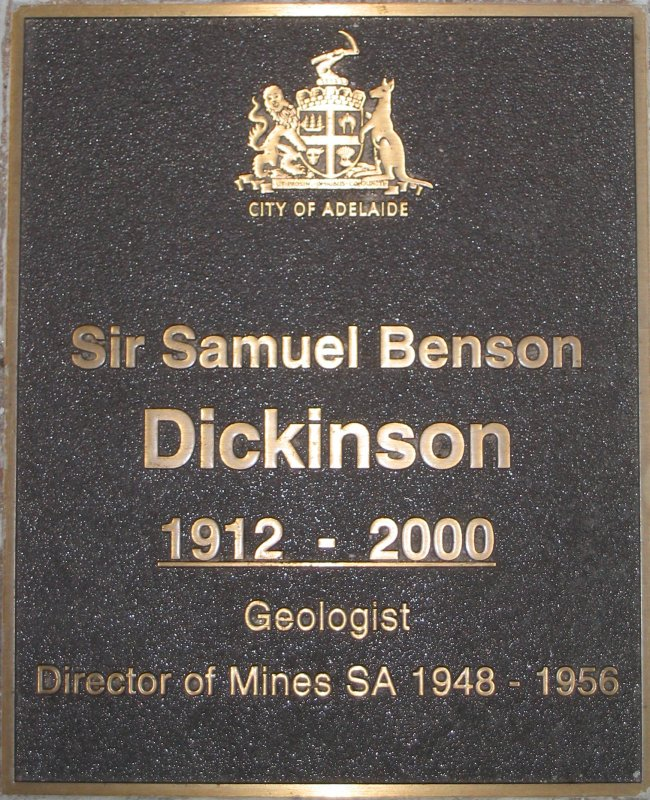
Plaque on the Jubilee 150 Walkway

Sir Samuel Benson "Ben" Dickinson (1 February 1912 – 2 February 2000) was an Australian geologist. He was government geologist in South Australia, before being appointed director of exploration for Rio Tinto Australia in 1956. In the 1960s he was a mining consultant working from Sydney, which include exploration work for Gove Bauxite Corporation in the Northern Territory. He retired in 1975, but continued to serve as a ministerial advisor in Adelaide for a further 10 years. He was knighted in the 1980 Birthday Honours.

== Early life and education ==
Samuel Benson Dickinson was born in Hobart, Tasmania, on 1 February 1912. He was a son of Sydney Rushbrook Dickinson (died 1 April 1949) and Margaret Dickinson, née Clemes, and was raised a Quaker.

He was educated at Haileybury College, Melbourne, where his father was headmaster, and the University of Melbourne, where he graduated with a first-class honours BSc in geology (1939) and MSc.

== Career ==
Benson worked for the Commonwealth Government on the North Australian Aerial Geological and Geophysical Survey (1935–1936) and was a geologist for Gold Mines of Australia in Victoria. He worked with Electrolytic Zinc Co. in Tasmania, and with Mt. Isa Mines, at Mount Isa, Queensland, from 1937 to 1941.

He was appointed Deputy-Director of Mines and Deputy Government Geologist in the South Australian Department of Mines (Note: The South Australian Department of Mines was founded in the Colony of South Australia in 1894 and was in existence until 1977, when it was renamed Department of Mines and Energy (1977-1997), Department for Primary Industries and Resources South Australia, eventually evolving into the Department for Environment and Water (2018-).) in 1942, and Director of Mines from 1948 to 1956. During this time, he created the Geological Survey of South Australia. Also during this period he was chairman of the Radium Hill Uranium Mining project 1943–1956, and he was responsible for the aerial survey and mapping of the Telford Cut coalfield at Leigh Creek.

In 1956, Dickinson resigned from the South Australian Public Service and took the position of director of exploration for Rio Tinto Australia based in Melbourne, Victoria.

He moved to Sydney, New South Wales, in 1960, becoming a mining consultant. He was appointed field manager of the Gove Bauxite Corporation (later Gominco) in the Northern Territory in 1962, which been established as an Australian company to keep profits in Australia. Dickinson wrote to Prime Minister Robert Menzies frequently during this period, advocating a "vigorous mineral development policy". The company lodged an application to mine bauxite on the Gove Peninsula in Arnhem Land. In consultation with the Sydney-based head of the Methodist Overseas Mission, Arthur Gribble, Dickinson started staking out an area for exploration, and announced plans to set up mining headquarters at Gunipinya, near the Yirrkala mission. Gunipinya was the site of a freshwater spring, and a sacred site for the local Yolngu people at the mission, who were upset at seeing their land being staked out for mining without consulting them. Mission superintendent Edgar Wells persuaded Dickinson to attend a meeting with around 60 Yolngu people, along with his French colleague Silve. Further meetings ensued, but the matter was not resolved, leading to the creation of the Yirrkala bark petitions, which were presented in the Australian Parliament in August 1963. Dickinson later appeared as a witness before the government committee set up to investigate the Yolngu's grievances. His view was that mining bauxite would bring prosperity to all through further development of the peninsula. The mining went ahead in the end.

On nominal retirement in 1975, he returned to Adelaide, where he served as a ministerial advisor for a further 10 years.

== Personal life ==
Dickinson married Jessica Helen Ward (4 March 1910 – 16 March 1993) on 22 November 1941 in Adelaide. They had two sons.

== Death and legacy ==
Dickinson died on 2 February 2000. He was survived by his sons from his first marriage as well as his second wife and their two children.

The basal animal Dickinsonia was named after him by Reg Sprigg.

== Recognition ==
- 1980: Knighted in the 1980 Birthday Honours.
- Commemorated by a bronze plaque on North Terrace, Adelaide, a supplementary addition to the original 150 plaques
- Elected Fellow of the Australasian Institute of Mining and Metallurgy (FAusIMM)
