= Amos William Howard =

English scientist (1848–1930)

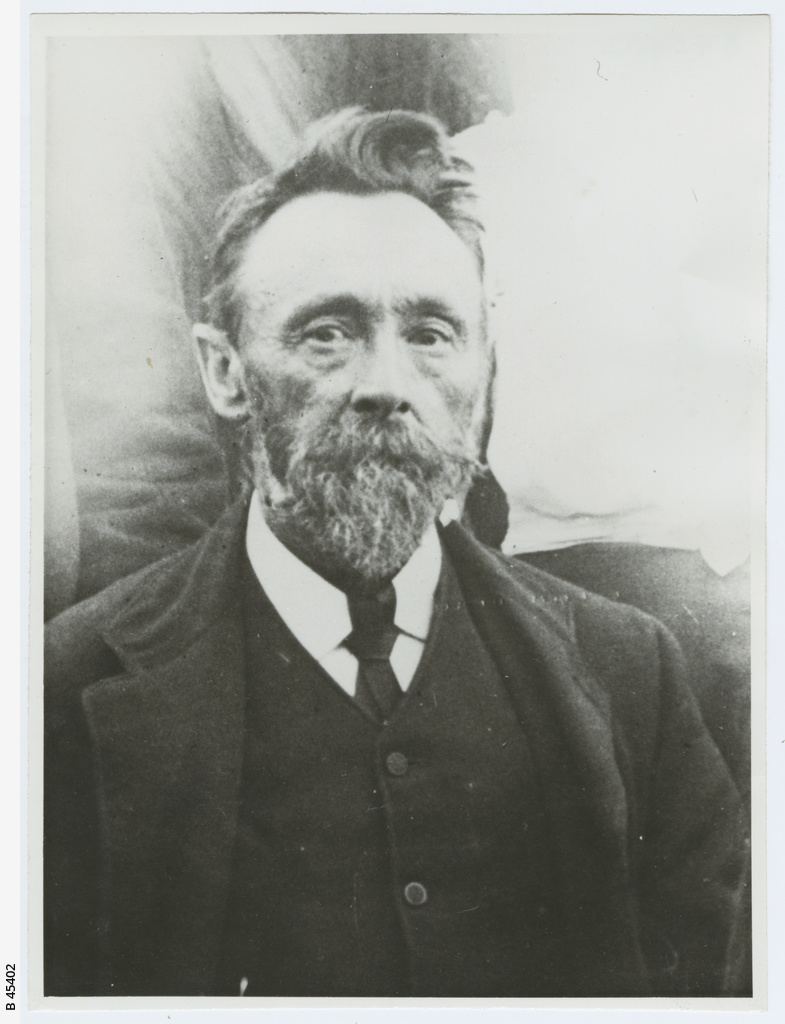
- Born: 31 May 1848; Silk Mills, Watford, Hertfordshire, England
- Died: 2 March 1930 (aged 81); Blakiston, South Australia, Australia
- Known for: Development of subterranean clover
- Scientific career
- Fields: agronomy

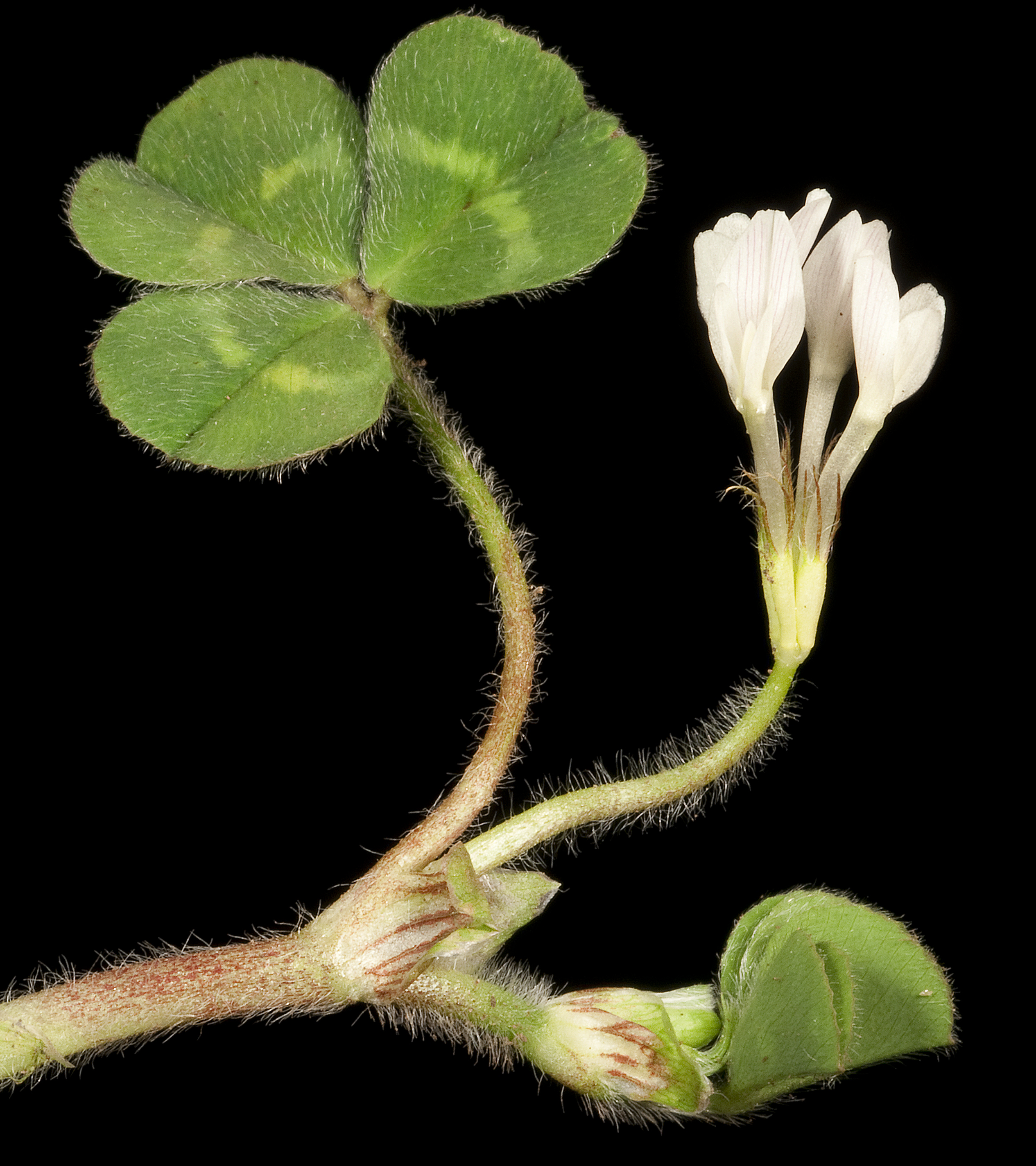
Subterranean clover

Amos William Howard (31 May 1848 – 2 March 1930) pioneered the introduction of subterranean clover as a fodder plant in Australia.

Born in England on 31 May 1848, Amos William Howard was the son of gardener William and Ann (née Hester) Howard.

In 1871 he married Eliza Rowe. In 1876 they migrated with their three children to South Australia on the ship Lightning, which ran aground on the Troubridge Shoal shortly before reaching its destination. The ship was refloated without loss of life, luggage or cargo.

In 1880, while employed as a gardener by South Australian politician, George Fowler, he wrote an essay for the Agricultural Society committee on how to pack fruit, such as grapes, plums and apples for export to England.

Howard later established a nursery at Mount Barker in the Adelaide Hills where, in about 1889 that he noticed subterranean clover growing near a neighbouring property where he supposedly had gone to buy a cow. He later found it on his property and recognised its potential as a fodder plant. From that point on, he set himself to collect, select, promote and sell the seed, with his first recorded sale consisting of 13 lb. of "clean seed" on 18 January 1906.

An article first appearing in the Adelaide Chronicle of 10 February 1906 included the following:

In the Mount Barker district we have a weed which I believe will go far to solve the problem of introducing nitrogen into the soil. This plant is an annual, one of the trefoil family. It first made its appearance in a grass paddock at Blakiston some 12 or more years ago, and now it may be seen in most of the grazing paddocks in the district. Although it may be well known to some botanists, the nearest approach to a name for it that I have been able to get is Trifolium subterraneum. Whatever its botanical name may be it is here called clover. It is an annual, easily grown and easily destroyed. Its roots are Iaden with the nitrogen-producing nodules to a greater degree than any other plant of this family. It is eaten ravenously by stock both in the green and the dry state, cattle eating the dry branches after the seed is ripe quickly spread it wherever they go. The seed is sown naturally on the surface, and appears to require no covering, as soon after the early autumn rains we find the plants established and racing away from all other herbage. The seed will grow if scattered amongst grass or scrub without further attention. Where it grows heavily it is cut for hay, and is equal to lucern or clover for fattening purposes either for sheep or cattle. One of its most valuable characteristics is that it will grow and reproduce itself in any soil and situation without human aid. Although valuable as a fodder plant where little else will grow, it can never be recommended for a crop, as its stems grow close to the ground and cannot well be harvested; but its value as a nitrogen-gathering plant cannot be over-estimated. At the same time when it is growing amongst grass a large quantity can be harvested, as may be seen in the grass stacks in the district.'

The article was reproduced widely around Australia at the time and Howard's contribution to improved pastures was still being recognised in articles in newspapers much later.

The work he was doing was of such importance to agriculture, that in 1928, the director of the Rothamsted research station, Sir John Russell, together with the South Australian deputy director of agriculture, Mr W. J. Spafford, visited him at his farm in Blakiston.

== Honours and legacy ==
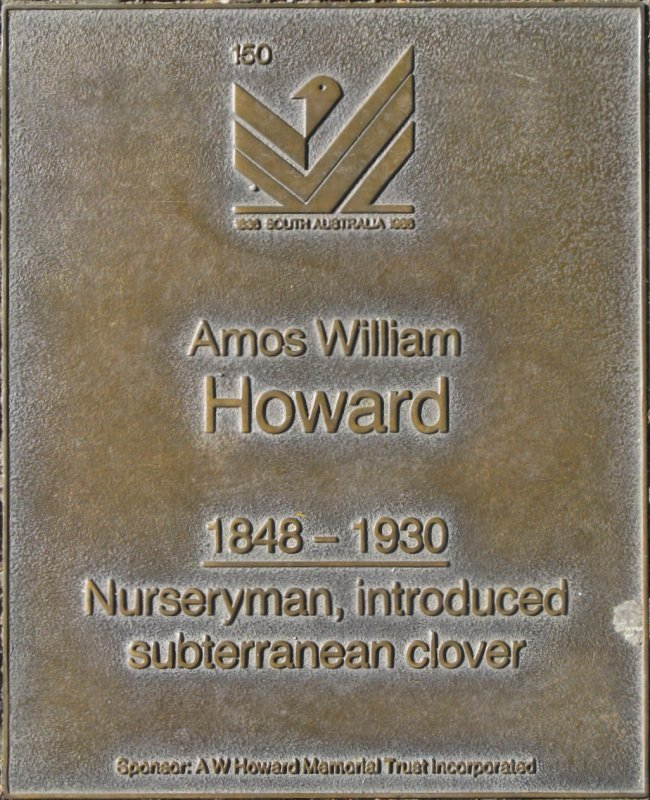
JJubilee 150 Walkway Plaque commemorating Amos Howard.

Two cultivars of subterranean clover have been named in his honour: "Howard" and "Mt Barker". A memorial to him on the Mount Barker Road was erected by the Australian Institute of Agricultural Science in 1963.

The A W Howard Memorial Trust Inc was established in 1964 in his name. It has awarded travel grants, research fellowships and study awards for pasture research annually to scientists and pastoralists. The AW Howard Medal is awarded every two years to an individual who has made a significant contribution to the advancement of pastures in Australia.

Howard is commemorated in the Jubilee 150 Walkway.
