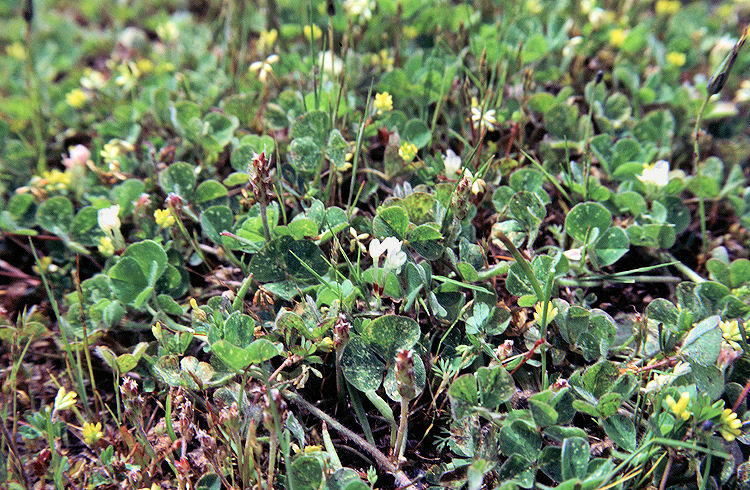

Conservation status
- Least Concern (IUCN 3.1)

Scientific classification
- Kingdom: Plantae
- Clade: Tracheophytes
- Clade: Angiosperms
- Clade: Eudicots
- Clade: Rosids
- Order: Fabales
- Family: Fabaceae
- Subfamily: Faboideae
- Genus: Trifolium
- Species: T. subterraneum

Binomial name
- Trifolium subterraneum L.

= Trifolium subterraneum =

Subterranean clover

Species of legume

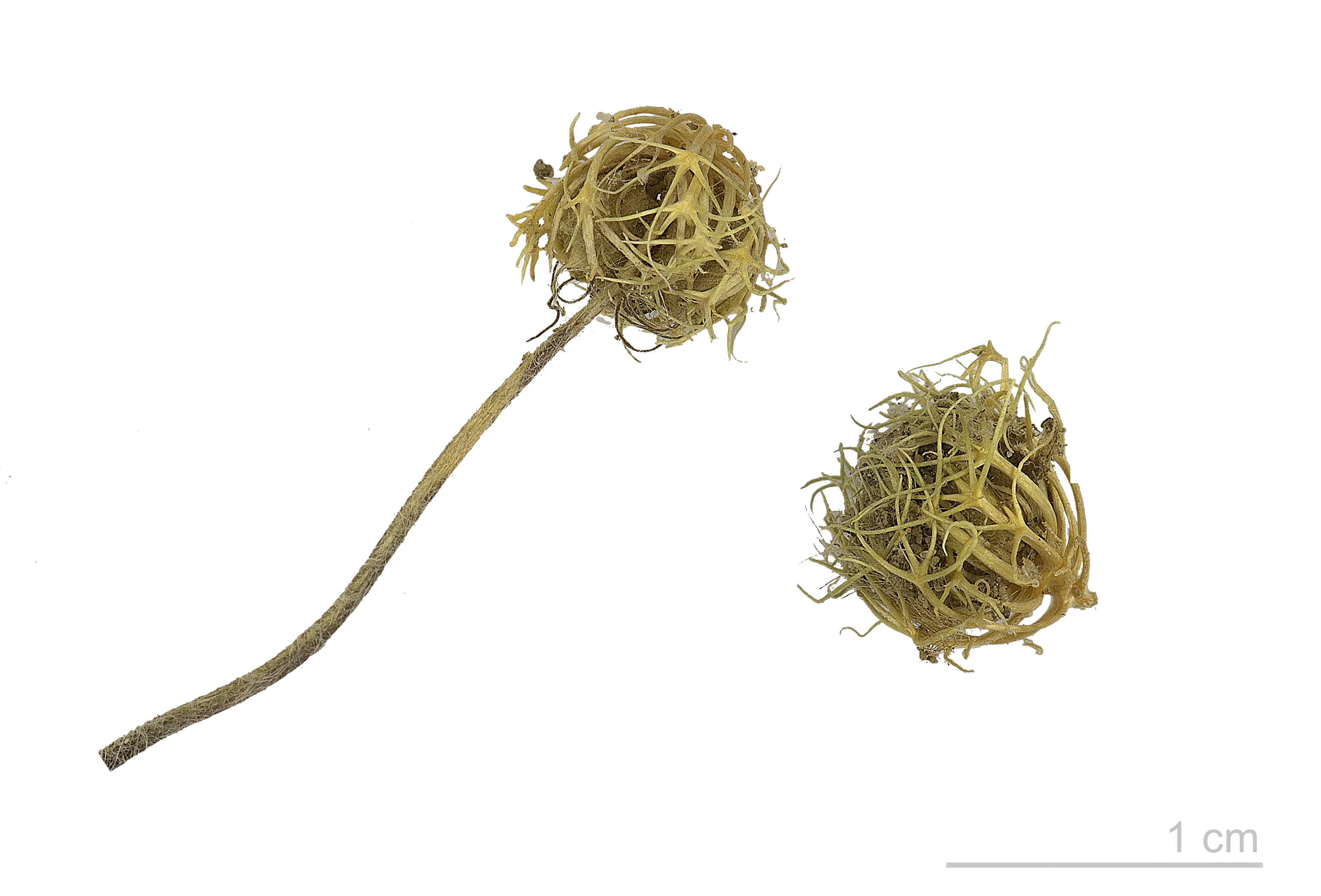
Trifolium subterraneum - MHNT

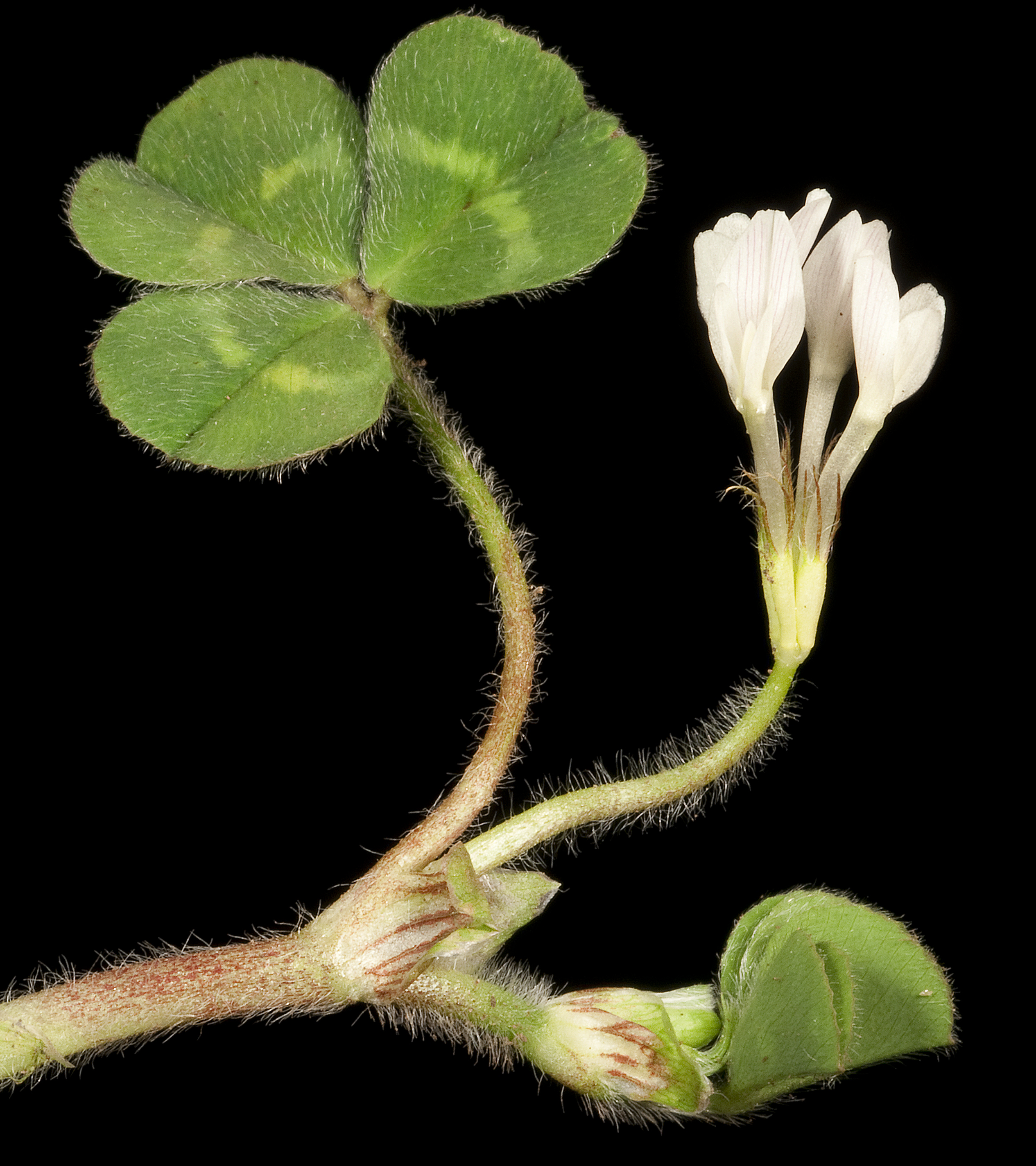
Trifolium subterraneum close-up

Trifolium subterraneum, the subterranean clover (often shortened to sub clover), subterranean trefoil, is a species of clover native to Europe, Southwest Asia, Northwest Africa and Macaronesia. The plant's name comes from its underground seed development (geocarpy), a characteristic not possessed by other clovers.

It can thrive in poor-quality soil where other clovers cannot survive, and is grown commercially for animal fodder. There are three distinct subspecies used in agriculture, each with its own ideal climate and soil type, allowing for wide distribution of the plant over varied environments.

- T. subterraneum subsp. subterraneum is the generalist subspecies, and it can be grown in the widest range of environments.
- T. subterraneum subsp. yanninicum is grown in moist areas that are prone to flooding or waterlogging.
- T. subterraneum subsp. brachycalycinum is a more sensitive plant, requiring dry, cracked soil for its germination.

Some systematists consider the three plants to be separate species. There are many strains and varieties of these subspecies, but few are in wide use. The technique of mixing the subspecies in one field is popular as a method of ensuring a dense crop. Also, subterranean clover is sometimes mixed with alfalfa for a longer-lasting grazing pasture.

This species is self-fertilizing, unlike most legume forage crops such as alfalfa and other clovers, which are pollinated by insects, especially honeybees. The flowers of subclover are often located beneath its leaves and are low in nectar, making access both difficult and unappealing for bees. These characteristics also make the plant less attractive to certain types of pest insects.

Subterranean clover is one of the most commonly grown forage crops in Australia. It provides high quality forage to livestock. It is also grown in places such as California and Texas, where the extreme ranges of soil type and quality, rainfall, and temperature make the variable tolerances of sub clover especially useful.

Subterranean clover can contain high levels of estrogenic compounds that may interfere with health and reproductive capability of animals that consume it.

== Discovery ==
While subterranean clover had been known for a very long time in Central and Southern Europe, it was looked upon as a roadside weed. Its value as a fodder crop was discovered, proved and first promoted by Amos William (A.W.) Howard, of Mount Barker, South Australia. Howard proved the clover to be a valuable fodder plant in some soil types in temperate climates. Subterranean clover revolutionised farming practice, converting many struggling farms into successful livestock holdings.

The discovery spread across Australia and to many other countries, due largely to Howard's generosity in publishing articles about the clover, supplying seed free of charge around the world, and advising on handling. By the time of his death on 2 March 1930, thousands of hectares in South Australia were carrying subterranean clover. It was also growing in all Australian States, and requests for seed and information were being received in great numbers from almost all countries in the world which had a temperate climate.

Howard's work is commemorated by a roadside plaque, by the incorporation of a clover leaf into the arms of the District Council of Mount Barker, and by the Howard Vineyard and winery on the same site.

In 1936, Yvonne Aitken — a graduate of Agricultural Science at the University of Melbourne — undertook considerable research into the species alongside another Melbourne graduate, Jim Harrison. Through two sets of extensive experiments, including a four-year time-of-sowing experiment, they were able to conclude that flowering time was controlled by response to hours of daylight and temperature change.
