= Johann Gramp =

Australian winemarker

- Born: 28 August 1819; Kulmbach, Kingdom of Bavaria
- Died: 9 August 1903 (aged 83); Barossa Valley, South Australia, Australia
- Occupations: Winemaker, politician, citrus-grower
- Spouse: Eleonora (née Nitzschke)
- Children: 3 sons, 3 daughters

Johann Gramp (28 August 1819 – 9 August 1903) was a Bavarian-born Australian winemaker, local politician and citrus-grower. He is best known for founding Orlando Wines in the Barossa Valley, South Australia, Australia.

== Biography ==
=== Early life ===
Johann Gramp was born on 28 August 1819 in Aichig (Kulmbach) near Kulmbach in Bavaria, where his father was a landowner. In 1837, he left Hamburg to migrate to Australia. The journey took four months, sailing on the 'Solway' via Rio de Janeiro and the Cape of Good Hope. He arrived in Kingscote on Kangaroo Island on 16 October 1837.

=== Career ===
From 1837 to 1839, he worked for the South Australian Company on Kangaroo Island. From 1839 to 1840, he worked for the same company, but in Port Adelaide, a suburb of Adelaide. Shortly after, he worked in a bakery in Adelaide.

He started a new life as a farmer in Yatala. In 1847, he moved to the Barossa Valley in rural South Australia and settled near Jacob's Creek. That same year, he planted his first vine there. Three years later, in 1850, he produced an octave of wine, a hock later known as Carte Blanche. Later, he purchased more land to expand his vineyard and added a cellar to his estate.

After ten years of living in the Barossa Valley, he was elected to serve on the Barossa East District Council in the 1860s, eventually serving as its chairman. While serving on the council, he was a proponent of building a state school in Rowland Flat for local children. He became a naturalized Australian citizen in 1872.

Later he grew citrus fruits in the Barossa Valley.

=== Personal life ===
He married Eleonora (Nitzschke) Gramp. They had three sons and three daughters. He was Lutheran.

=== Death and legacy ===
He died on 9 August 1903 at his estate in the Barossa Valley. His son Gustav Gramp took over the vineyard, until it was inherited by his grandson, Hugo Gramp in 1920 until his death in 1938. It stayed in the Gramp family until the 1970s, when it was purchased by Reckitt and Colman, and eventually by Pernod Ricard.
