= Blakiston, South Australia =

Blakiston
- Town
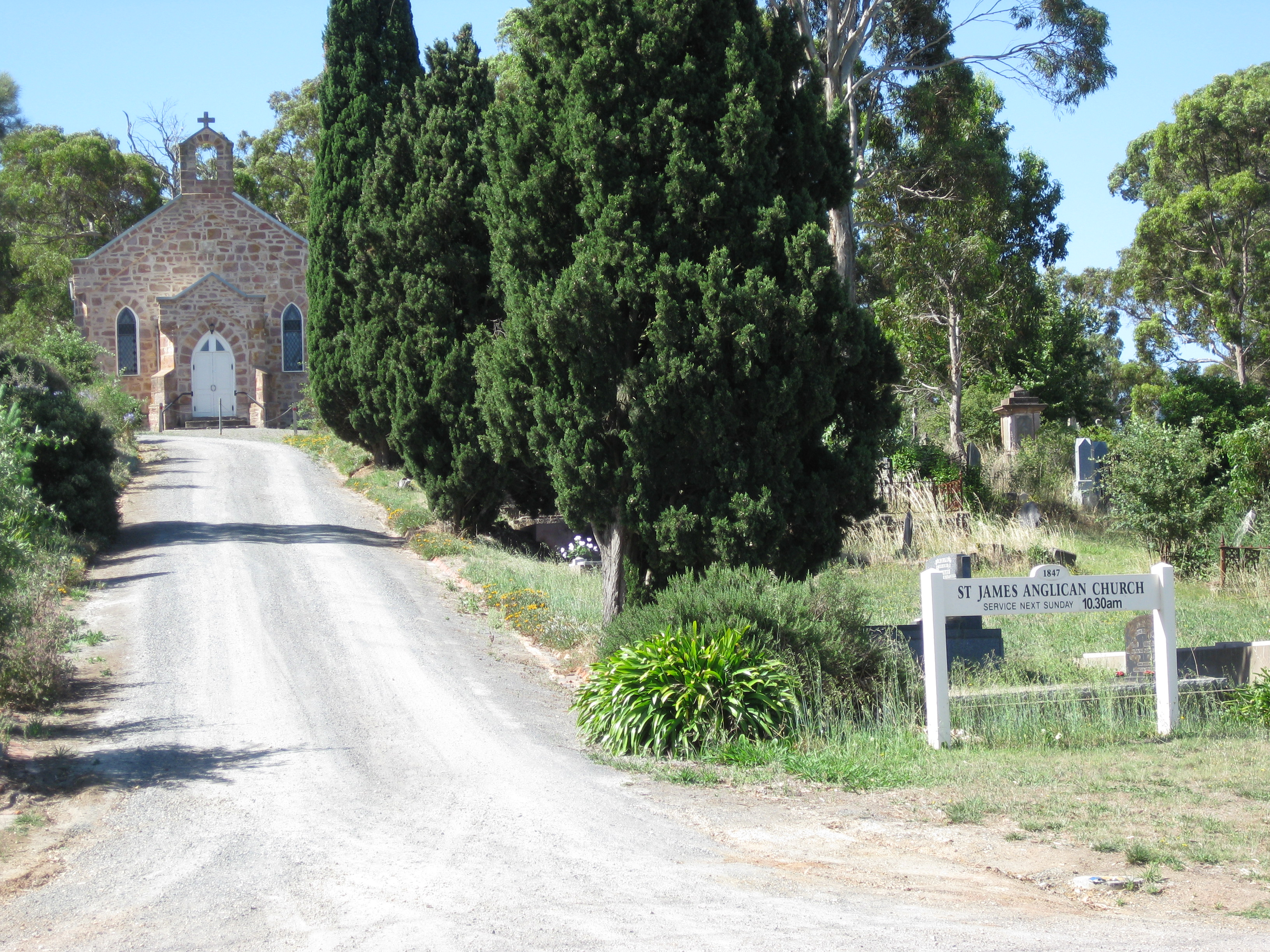
- St James' Church

- Coordinates: 35°02′37″S 138°52′48″E
- Country: Australia
- State: South Australia
- Region: Adelaide Hills
- LGA: District Council of Mount Barker
- Location: 36 km (22 mi) SE of Adelaide; 6 km (3.7 mi) NE of Mount Barker; 2 km (1.2 mi) E of Littlehampton
- Established: 1839 (town); 2003 (locality)

Government
  - State electorate: Kavel
  - Federal division: Mayo

Population
  - Total: 377 (SAL 2021)
- Time zone: UTC+9:30 (ACST)
  - Summer (DST): UTC+10:30 (ACST)
- Postcode: 5250
- County: Hindmarsh
Localities around Blakiston
Littlehampton	Nairne	Nairne
Littlehampton	Blakiston	Nairne
Mount Barker	Mount Barker	Mount Barker

Blakiston is a town in the Australian state of South Australia. The town is located approximately 36 kilometres (22 mi) south-east of the state capital of Adelaide, adjacent to the Princes Highway. Its postal code is 5250 – though it has no post office. Post is delivered to the neighbouring town of Littlehampton which shares the post code. The town and surrounding countryside, a mixture of pastureland and eucalypt forest, make up around 16 square kilometres. At the 2021 census, the locality of Blakiston had a population of 377 and a median age of 46.

There are no signs or markers to indicate that Blakiston is separate from nearby Littlehampton, and they are increasingly indistinguishable as housing developments encroach.

== History ==
Blakiston was founded by European settlers 1846. The town was founded by Francis Davison and named for his ancestral home, Blakiston Hall in County Durham. Variant spellings of the name were used until 1850.

== Buildings ==
Buildings include a roadside pub and stage house (currently a private house), a cheese factory converted to a private residence, St James Church (consecrated in 1846) and neighbouring rectory, a demolished school house and the large residence of Blakiston House, as well as a smaller residence. Rumour has it that the old school house was demolished by rampaging cattle some time in the mid-20th century. In recent years the school house was restored with funding from Mount Barker District Council and a bequest from a local Rotary Club member. All these structures date from the mid to late 19th century and are constructed from a mix of pink sandstone and red brick. There are a few other houses dating from the mid-20th century.

=== St James Church of England ===
St James Church of England, in the town of Blakiston, is the sixth oldest Anglican Church in South Australia. The 10 acres (4.0 ha) plot of the church, cemetery and rectory was bought by George Morphett and Samuel Stocks from McFarlane in 1843 and was given for the building of the church in May 1846. The parsonage was completed, and occupied by the Rev. James Pollitt, in late 1846 and completion of the church building was promised for the following year. Sentence of consecration was pronounced and the church consecrated by the Lord Bishop of Adelaide on 28 April 1848.

The church is constructed of sandstone and includes the chapel and rector's changing room. It includes some pretty stained glass windows, old pews and a small organ. On the lower east wall are some small carvings of sailing ships, possibly dating back to the mid-19th century. Adjacent to the church is a small bell tower of later heritage. As of 2008, the church and cemetery are still in use, while the rectory and surrounding acreage are rented out by the Church of England to private tenants.

In 1980, the church was listed on the now-defunct Register of the National Estate.

=== Rectory ===
The rectory is a single-storey sandstone building dating back to the construction of the church. It has six main rooms, including: a formal dining room, rector's study, bedroom, formal living room, the original kitchen no longer in use, and another small room of unknown use. A newer addition was added to the house in the early 20th century which today includes the kitchen/breakfast room and a bathroom. The house has an old disused cellar. The roof of the rectory is made of corrugated iron but hides an original timber shingle roof. The shingle roof can no longer be seen but is thought to be in pristine condition. Former tenants of the rectory have reported seeing a ghostly figure in the rector's study; the alleged apparition is of an old man, sitting and quietly reading.

Behind the rectory was a three-sided barn, also made of sandstone, with an earth floor and corrugated iron roof. One of the walls collapsed in the early 1980s and was inadequately replaced with corrugated iron cladding. It has since been demolished. Nearby is also a brick outhouse.
