= Head of the River (Australia) =

Series of rowing regattas in Australia

The Head of the River is a name given to annual Australian rowing regattas held in South Australia, New South Wales, Victoria, Queensland, Tasmania and Western Australia. The regattas feature competing independent schools, and the winner of the 1st division boys or girls race is crowned the "Head of the River".

The name Head of the River is taken from similar regattas held in other countries, including the Head of the River Race held annually on the Thames in London since 1926.

== New South Wales ==
=== AAGPS Head of the River Regatta ===
The Head of the River takes place in Penrith, New South Wales, Australia, at the end of the first term (normally in March) at the Sydney International Regatta Centre (SIRC). It is the culmination of the AAGPS (Athletic Association of the Great Public Schools) rowing season and has been held since 1893, initially on the Parramatta River and then from 1936 to 1995 on the Nepean River. On the Nepean, the senior events were the 1st VIII, 2nd VIII, 1st IV, 2nd IV, 3rd IV and 4th IV. The VIIIs rowed over a mile and a half and the IVs over a mile.

In 1996, the regatta was moved to the then preparatory Olympic course and since then raced over 2000 metres. In 2001, a 3rd VIII event and the three-year 10 VIII events were added to the programme.

The competing schools are Sydney Grammar School, The King's School, Newington College, Sydney Boys' High School, The Scots College, St. Joseph's College, Saint Ignatius' College, The Armidale School and Shore School.

=== NSW Schoolgirl Head of the River Regatta ===
The NSW Schoolgirl Head of the River was first raced in 1991. The inaugural Schoolgirl Head of the River Regatta took place in October 1991 on Middle Harbour Creek at Davidson Park, Roseville. The regatta is now usually held at the Sydney International Regatta Centre (SIRC), Penrith on the Saturday following the Schoolboy Head of the River. It is the culmination of the Schoolgirls rowing season that involves crews from Independent Schools, Catholic Colleges and State High Schools.

The NSW Schoolgirl Head of the River is organised by the Combined Independent Schools Sports Council. Schools that are eligible to compete in the NSW Schoolgirl Head of the River are all affiliated schools of the NSW Combined Independent Schools Sports Council (NSWCISSC), NSW Combined High Schools Sports Association (NSWCHSSA) and the NSW Combined Catholic Colleges Sports Association (NSWCCCSA). The regatta is run in accordance with Rowing NSW laws of boat racing.

In 2018, Pymble Ladies' College won the 1st VIII Race and then went on to win the Australian National Championships.

== South Australia ==
=== South Australian School's Head of the River Regatta ===
The South Australian Head of the River is a collegiate rowing race held between the colleges and schools of Adelaide, Australia. It is the culmination of the Rowing South Australia's schools' season and is the most prestigious event on the calendar. Races are generally hard-fought, close encounters that showcase the very best of junior rowing talent, with the winning 1st VIII crew each year being crowned with the title of 'Head of the River'. Inter and Junior coxed quad crews fight for the same honour in their respective divisions. These title races come with immense pressure, with wins considered significant successes for the victorious schools and their rowing programs. The event draws huge crowds of up to 15,000 (2010) from across the state, generally consisting of school students, parent supporters, and old scholars.

The regatta is currently held at the world standard course at West Lakes International Regatta Centre and involves junior and inter coxed quadruple sculling events over 1,000m and 1,500m respectively, as well as senior coxed four and eight races over 2,000m. The South Australian Head of the River is held on the second-to-last Saturday of the first school term of each year.

The event had its inception on the Torrens Lake in 1922 as the result of a challenge between St. Peters and Adelaide High School. However St. Peters and their traditional rivals Prince Alfred have been racing for the prestigious Blackmore Shield which is to be contested only between the two schools since 1892 as part of their Intercollegiate program. When the Blackmore Shield changes hands, the Captain and Vice-Captain of Boats from the losing school present the shield to their counterparts in front of an assembly of the victorious school. Since 1923 this race has been incorporated into the Boys 1st VIII race at the Head of the River. The trophy presented to the overall winning Schoolboy 1st VIII is the Gosse Shield, which was presented by Sir John Gosse and his family as a perpetual trophy in 1932.

Competing schools are drawn from Adelaide's traditional independent schools and an increasing number of state schools. Since the 1970s the number of girls competing in the regatta has steadily increased; resulting in now larger numbers of female rowers than male competing at the regatta. Seymour College (an all-girls school) gained entry to the regatta in 2006, and Annesley College (an all-girls school) competed for the first time in 2007. Loreto College, Marryatville first competed in 2012 and St Peter's Collegiate Girls' School entered in 2013. Currently 15 schools compete in the regatta: 3 all boys schools, 5 all girls schools and 7 co-educational schools. At the 2019 Head of the River, hosted by Pembroke School, there were a total of 1162 athletes entered into the regatta's 36 events.

Walford Anglican School for Girls has won the Florence Eaton Cup awarded to the winning Schoolgirl 1st VIII crew a record 19 times.

In 2022 Walford's winning time of 6:47.75 was a course record beating the previous record of 6:48.06, held by Walford from 2010.

Until 2005 the Head of the River was officially known as the Public Schools' Regatta. The name has since been changed to the "Schools' Regatta" by the Heads of Rowing Schools Committee, a committee of the Headmasters/Principals of the Head of the River Schools.

==== Second VIII's ====
The Clinker IV event was constituted the Second Crews's Race in 1938 and was rowed in eights from 1957.

==== Open, Under 16 and Under 15 ====
These events were rowed on fixed seats until the introduction of slides for Open and Under 16 Fours in 1937, and Under 15 Fours in 1938. In 1932 and 1933 Open Tub Slides were rowed as well as Open Fixed and were won both years by S.P.S.C.

==== Under 14 Quad Sculls ====
Coxed quad sculls replaced sweep oar fours in division A in 1991, division B in 1992, division C in 1993.

=== Competing schools ===
School	First Entry	Colours	Type
Adelaide High School	1922 (as Adelaide Boys High School)	Black with White Trim	Co-ed
Annesley College	2007		
Christian Brothers College	1961	Navy Shorts, White and Purple Top	Boys
Loreto College, Marryatville	2012	Saxe Blue with Gold Trim	Girls
Norwood Morialta High School		Navy with Red and Gold Stripes	Co-ed
Pembroke School	1961 (as Kings College)	Green, Blue and Gold	Co-ed
Prince Alfred College	1922	Maroon with White Trim	Boys
Pulteney Grammar School	1961	Navy with Gold and White 'V'	Co-ed
Scotch College	1922	Gold with Navy Shorts and Trim	Co-ed
Seymour College	2006	Green Top with White 'V' and Navy Shorts	Girls
Sacred Heart College	1963 (withdrew 1967)		
St Ignatius' College		Navy with Red and Gold Trim	Co-ed
St Peter's College	1922	Royal Blue with White Trim	Boys
St Peter's Collegiate Girls' School	2013	Navy Shorts, Royal Blue and White Top	Girls
Unley High School	1978	Blue and Lighter Blue	Co-ed
Walford Anglican School	1989	Sky Blue Top with Gold 'V' and Navy Shorts	Girls
Wilderness School	1987	Black Shorts, Pale Blue and White Top	Girls

=== South Australian Head of the River – Boys Results ===
Boys Open First VIII – for The Gosse Shield

Presented in 1932 by the late Sir James Gosse and his family as a perpetual trophy.

The Gosse Shield was presented for the first time in 1932 by James H Gosse (1876–1952), son of William Christie Gosse, the government-appointed surveyor who documented Uluru (Ayers Rock) in 1873.

James and his brother William Hay Gosse (1875–1918 killed in action in WWI) both rowed at St Peter’s College.

James rowed in the First Four in 1895 and 1896 (before the advent of eight-oared schoolboy crews). He went on to row for South Australia in 1902-05 and was the President of the Adelaide Rowing Club. As well as playing football for the Norwood Football Club as a ruckman (1894–1905), he captained Norwood in 1905 as well as the State Team. He was President of Norwood Football Club from 1920–39 and SANFL President from 1945 until his death in 1952.

Sir James Hay Gosse was knighted in 1947 with acknowledgement to his commerce and philanthropy commitment in South Australia

Year	Course	Dist	Champion	Winning Time	2nd	3rd	4th	5th	6th	7th	8th
1922	Torrens Lake	900m	A.H.S.								
1923	Torrens Lake	900m	S.P.S.C.								
1924	Torrens Lake	900m	S.P.S.C. (2)								
1925	Torrens Lake	900m	S.P.S.C. (3)								
1926	Torrens Lake	900m	A.H.S. (2)								
1927 Apr	Torrens Lake	900m	A.H.S. (3)								
1927 Dec	Torrens Lake	900m	S.P.S.C. (4)								
1928 Apr	Torrens Lake	900m	S.P.S.C. (5)								
1928 Dec	Torrens Lake	900m	Scotch								
1929 Apr	Torrens Lake	900m	S.P.S.C. (6)								
1929 Dec	Torrens Lake	900m	Scotch (2)								
1930 Apr	Torrens Lake	900m	S.P.S.C. (7)								
1930 Dec	Torrens Lake	900m	Scotch (3)								
1931 Apr	Torrens Lake	900m	S.P.S.C. (8)								
1931 Dec	Torrens Lake	900m	S.P.S.C. (9)								
1932	Torrens Lake	900m	P.A.C.	3min 01.35sec							
1933	Torrens Lake	900m	P.A.C. (2)	3min 09.50sec	Adelaide HS						
1934	Torrens Lake	900m	S.P.S.C. (10)	3min 01.50sec	Scotch						
1935	Torrens Lake	900m	S.P.S.C. (11)	3min 04.35sec	Prince Alfred						
1936	Torrens Lake	900m	S.P.S.C. (12)	3min 04.50sec	Adelaide HS						
1937	Torrens Lake	900m	P.A.C. (3)	2min 59.25sec							
1938	Torrens Lake	900m	P.A.C. (4)	3min 08.00sec	St Peter's						
1939	Torrens Lake	900m	Scotch (4)	3min 02.10sec	Prince Alfred						
1940	Torrens Lake	900m	S.P.S.C. (13) / Scotch (5)	3min 00.50sec							
1941	Torrens Lake	900m	P.A.C. (5)	3min 02.00sec	Adelaide HS						
1942	Torrens Lake	900m	P.A.C. (6)	N.T.T.	Adelaide HS						
1943	Torrens Lake	900m	Scotch (6)	N.T.T.	Prince Alfred						
1944	Torrens Lake	900m	Scotch (7)	2min 57.00sec	Prince Alfred						
1945	Torrens Lake	900m	S.P.S.C. (14)	2min 57.50sec	Prince Alfred						
1946	Torrens Lake	900m	S.P.S.C. (15)	2min 59.00sec	Adelaide HS						
1947	Torrens Lake	900m	S.P.S.C. (16)	2min 55.50sec	Prince Alfred						
1948	Cancelled due to Poliomyelitis Epidemics										
1949	Torrens Lake	900m	S.P.S.C. (17)	2min 58.00sec	Prince Alfred						
1950	Cancelled due to Poliomyelitis Epidemics										
1951	Torrens Lake	900m	S.P.S.C. (18)	2min 58.00sec	Adelaide HS						
1952	Torrens Lake	900m	S.P.S.C. (19)	3min 04.25sec	Adelaide HS						
1953	Torrens Lake	900m	S.P.S.C. (20)	3min 01.00sec	Prince Alfred						
1954	Torrens Lake	900m	Scotch (8)	2min 54.00sec	Prince Alfred						
1955	Torrens Lake	900m	S.P.S.C. (21)	3min 00.50sec	Scotch						
1956	Torrens Lake	900m	S.P.S.C. (22)	2min 55.50sec	Scotch						
1957	Torrens Lake	900m	S.P.S.C. (23)	3min 07.50sec	Scotch						
1958	Torrens Lake	900m	A.H.S. (4)	2min 57.00sec	St Peter's						
1959	Torrens Lake	900m	S.P.S.C. (24)	2min 54.50sec	Scotch						
1960	Torrens Lake	900m	S.P.S.C. (25)	2min 55.35sec	Prince Alfred						
1961	Torrens Lake	900m	Pulteney	2min 57.50sec	Prince Alfred						
1962	Torrens Lake	900m	S.P.S.C. (26)	3min 00.50sec	Pulteney						
1963	Torrens Lake	900m	Kings	2min 58.00sec	Scotch						
1964	Torrens Lake	900m	S.P.S.C. (27)	2min 47.00sec	CBC						
1965	Torrens Lake	900m	S.P.S.C. (28)	2min 50.00sec	Pulteney						
1966	Torrens Lake	900m	Kings (2)	2min 48.00sec	St Peter's						
1967	Port River		Kings (3)	5min 14.00sec	Scotch						
1968	Torrens Lake	900m	Pulteney (2)	2min 46.00sec	Prince Alfred						
1969	Torrens Lake	900m	Pulteney (3)	2min 44.00sec	Scotch						
1970	Torrens Lake	900m	Pulteney (4)	2min 48.50sec	Scotch						
1971	Torrens Lake	900m	Pulteney (5)	2min 45.00sec	St Peter's						
1972	Torrens Lake	900m	S.P.S.C. (29)	3min 00.50sec	Pembroke						
1973	Torrens Lake	900m	S.P.S.C. (30)	2min 53.50sec	Pulteney						
1974	Torrens Lake	900m	S.P.S.C. (31)	2min 47.50sec	Scotch	Adelaide HS					
1975	Torrens Lake	900m	S.P.S.C. (32)	2min 46.00sec	CBC						
1976	Torrens Lake	900m	S.P.S.C. (33)	2min 54.50sec	Prince Alfred						
1977	West Lakes	1500m	Pulteney (6)	4min 49.00sec	St Peter's						
1978	West Lakes	1500m	Pulteney (7)	4min 40.00sec	CBC						
1979	West Lakes	1500m	P.A.C. (7)	4min 35.00sec	St Peter's						
1980	West Lakes	1500m	C.B.C.	4min 57.50sec	Prince Alfred	Pulteney					
1981	West Lakes	1500m	S.P.S.C. (34)	5min 09.50sec	CBC						
1982	West Lakes	1500m	S.P.S.C. (35)	5min 06.00sec	Prince Alfred						
1983	West Lakes	1500m	Pembroke (4)	4min 50.00sec	CBC	Scotch					
1984	West Lakes	1500m	P.A.C. (8)	4min 56.00sec	St Peter's	Pulteney					
1985	West Lakes	1500m	S.P.S.C. (36)	4min 36.10sec	Pembroke						
1986	West Lakes	1500m	S.P.S.C. (37)	4min 31.00sec	Pembroke						
1987	West Lakes	1500m	U.H.S.	4min 39.00sec	Pembroke	St Peter's	P.A.C.				
1988	West Lakes	1500m	Pembroke (5)	4min 31.00sec	CBC						
1989	West Lakes	1500m	C.B.C. (2)	4min 41.60sec	St Peter's						
1990	West Lakes	2000m	S.P.S.C. (38)	6min 04.02sec	Pulteney						
1991	West Lakes	2000m	S.P.S.C. (39)	6min 06.00sec	Pembroke						
1992	West Lakes	2000m	S.P.S.C. (40)	6min 15.00sec	Prince Alfred						
1993	West Lakes	2000m	P.A.C. (9)	6min 09.00sec	Scotch						
1994	West Lakes	2000m	S.P.S.C. (41)	5min 36.00sec	Prince Alfred						
1995	West Lakes	2000m	Scotch (9)	Unknown	Prince Alfred						
1996	West Lakes	2000m	S.P.S.C. (42)	Unknown	Prince Alfred						
1997	West Lakes	2000m	S.P.S.C. (43)	Unknown	Prince Alfred						
1998	West Lakes	2000m	S.P.S.C. (44)	Unknown	Prince Alfred						
1999	West Lakes	2000m	P.A.C. (10)	5min 54.40sec	St Peter's						
2000	West Lakes	2000m	S.P.S.C. (45)	6min 01.80sec	Scotch						
2001	West Lakes	2000m	P.A.C. (11)	5min 55.00sec	St Peter's						
2002	West Lakes	2000m	P.A.C. (12)	6min 13.90sec	St Peter's						
2003	West Lakes	2000m	S.P.S.C. (46)	6min 05.00sec							
2004	West Lakes	2000m	P.A.C. (13)	6min 02.60sec							
2005	West Lakes	2000m	S.P.S.C. (47)	6min 44.10sec							
2006	West Lakes	2000m	S.P.S.C. (48)	5min 56.00sec							
2007	West Lakes	2000m	S.P.S.C. (49)	6min 00.60sec	Pembroke	Prince Alfred	Scotch	Pulteney	CBC	Unley HS	Norwood
2008	West Lakes	2000m	S.P.S.C. (50)	6min 09.60sec	Pembroke	Prince Alfred	Unley HS	Pulteney	Scotch	CBC	Adelaide HS
2009	West Lakes	2000m	S.P.S.C. (51)	6min 01.90sec	Prince Alfred	Pembroke	Unley HS	Scotch	Norwood	Pulteney	CBC
2010	West Lakes	2000m	S.P.S.C. (52)	5min 58.90sec	Scotch	Prince Alfred	Norwood	Pembroke	Pulteney	Unley HS	-
2011	West Lakes	2000m	S.P.S.C. (53)	6min 54.20sec	Prince Alfred	Scotch	Pembroke	CBC	Pulteney	Unley HS	-
2012	West Lakes	2000m	P.A.C. (14)	6min 07.80sec	St Peter's	Scotch	Pulteney	Pembroke	CBC	Unley HS	Adelaide HS
2013	West Lakes	2000m	P.A.C. (15)	6min 03.2sec	St Peter's	Pembroke	Scotch	Pulteney	Unley HS	CBC	-
2014	West Lakes	2000m	P.A.C. (16)	6min 35.6sec	St Peter's	Pembroke	Scotch	Pulteney	CBC	Unley HS	-
2015	West Lakes	2000m	Scotch (10)	6min 03.9sec	Prince Alfred	St Peter's	Pulteney	Unley HS	Pembroke	Adelaide HS	-
2016	West Lakes	2000m	S.P.S.C. (54)	6min 01.6sec	Prince Alfred	Scotch	Pulteney	Pembroke	CBC	-	-
2017	West Lakes	2000m	S.P.S.C. (55)	6min 04.5sec	Prince Alfred	Scotch	CBC	Pulteney	Pembroke	Unley HS	-
2018	West Lakes	2000m	S.P.S.C. (56)	7min 11.7sec	Pembroke	Unley HS	Scotch	Prince Alfred	Pulteney	CBC	-
2019	West Lakes	2000m	S.P.S.C. (57)	6min 07.3sec	Prince Alfred	Pulteney	Scotch	Unley HS	Norwood	-	
2020	West Lakes	2000m	S.P.S.C. (58)	6min 22.7sec	Scotch	Prince Alfred	Pembroke	Norwood	Unley HS	Pulteney	-
2021	West Lakes	2000m	S.P.S.C. (58)	6min 06.23sec	Prince Alfred	Scotch	Norwood	Pembroke	Adelaide HS	Unley HS	St Ignatius
2022	West Lakes	2000m	S.P.S.C. (59)	5min 57.81sec	Prince Alfred	Scotch	Norwood	Pulteney	Pembroke	CBC	
2023	West Lakes	2000m	S.P.S.C. (60)	6min 03.59sec	Prince Alfred	Scotch	Norwood	Pembroke	CBC	Unley HS	Adelaide HS
2024	West Lakes	2000m	S.P.S.C. (61)	6min 24.30sec	Prince Alfred	Scotch	Unley HS	Pembroke	Norwood	Adelaide HS	CBC
2025	West Lakes	2000m	P.A.C. (17)		S.P.S.C.						

Boys Open Second VIII – for The Wallman Trophy

Presented by the late RH Wallman Esq in 1937 as a perpetual trophy.

Year	Dist	Champion	Winning Time	2nd	3rd	4th	5th
Rowed as the Clinker IV's
1934	900m	S.P.S.C.					
1935	900m	A.H.S.					
1936	900m	S.P.S.C.					
1937	900m	S.P.S.C.					
1938	900m	P.A.C.					
1939	900m	S.P.S.C.					
1940	900m	A.H.S.					
1941	900m	A.H.S.					
1942	900m	A.H.S.					
1943	900m	Scotch					
1944	900m	A.H.S.					
1945	900m	A.H.S.					
1946	900m	P.A.C.					
1947	900m	A.H.S.					
1948	Cancelled due to Poliomyelitis Epidemics						
1949	900m	S.P.S.C.					
1950	Cancelled due to Poliomyelitis Epidemics						
1951	900m	S.P.S.C.					
1952	900m	P.A.C.					
1953	900m	P.A.C.					
1954	900m	P.A.C.					
1955	900m	P.A.C.					
1956	900m	P.A.C.					
Rowed as Second VIII's
1957	900m	S.P.S.C.					
1958	900m	P.A.C.					
1959	900m	S.P.S.C.					
1960	900m	P.A.C.					
1961	900m	S.P.S.C.					
1962	900m	Pulteney					
1963	900m	S.P.S.C.					
1964	900m	S.P.S.C.					
1965	900m	S.P.S.C.					
1966	900m	S.P.S.C.					
1967		Scotch					
1968	900m	Pulteney					
1969	900m	Pulteney					
1970	900m	S.P.S.C.					
1971	900m	P.A.C.					
1972	900m	S.P.S.C.					
1973	900m	S.P.S.C.					
1974	900m	S.P.S.C.					
1975	900m	Scotch					
1976	900m	S.P.S.C.					
1977	1500m	Pulteney					
1978	1500m	S.P.S.C.					
1979	1500m						
1980	1500m	Scotch					
1981	1500m	S.P.S.C.					
1982	1500m	S.P.S.C.					
1983	1500m	Pulteney					
1984	1500m	Scotch					
1985	1500m	Pulteney					
1986	1500m	S.P.S.C.					
1987	1500m	S.P.S.C.					
1988	1500m	S.P.S.C.					
1989	1500m	Pembroke					
1990	2000m	C.B.C.					
1991	2000m	S.P.S.C.					
1992	2000m	P.A.C.					
1993	2000m	P.A.C.					
1993	2000m	P.A.C.					
1994	2000m	S.P.S.C.	5min 56.0sec				
1995	2000m						
1996	2000m						
1997	2000m						
1998	2000m						
1999	2000m	S.P.S.C.	6min 25.4sec				
2000	2000m	S.P.S.C.	6min 22.8sec				
2001	2000m	S.P.S.C.	6min 11.0sec				
2002	2000m	P.A.C.	6min 44.9sec				
2003	2000m	P.A.C.	6min 20.0sec				
2004	2000m	S.P.S.C.	6min 30.4sec				
2005	2000m	S.P.S.C.	7min 11.6sec				
2006	2000m	S.P.S.C.	6min 15.5sec	Prince Alfred	Pulteney		
2007	2000m	S.P.S.C.	6min 25.7sec	Prince Alfred	Scotch	Pulteney	-
2008	2000m	P.A.C.	6min 37.6sec	St Peter's	Unley HS	-	-
2009	2000m	S.P.S.C.	6min 17.2sec	Prince Alfred	Unley HS	-	-
2010	2000m	P.A.C.	6min 23.0sec	St Peter's	Scotch	Norwood	-
2011	2000m	S.P.S.C.	7min 10.3sec	Prince Alfred	St Peter's 2	Scotch	Pembroke
2012	2000m	P.A.C.	6min 16.6sec	St Peter's	Scotch	Pembroke	-
2013	2000m	S.P.S.C.	6min 22.5sec	-	-	-	-
2014	2000m	S.P.S.C.	6min 48.3sec	Prince Alfred	Scotch	-	-
2015	2000m	Scotch	6min 28.8sec	St Peter's	Prince Alfred	-	-
2016	2000m	P.A.C.	6min 18.1sec	Scotch	St Peter's	Pembroke	CBC
2017	2000m	S.P.S.C.	6min 24.3sec	Pembroke	Scotch	Prince Alfred	
2018	2000m	S.P.S.C.	6min 59.9sec	Prince Alfred	Unley HS		
2019	2000m	S.P.S.C.	6min 21.8sec	St Peter's (3rd VIII)	Prince Alfred	Scotch	St Peter's (4th VIII)
2020	2000m	S.P.S.C.	6min 36.2sec	Prince Alfred	St Peter's (3rd VIII)	Scotch	Pembroke
2021	2000m	S.P.S.C.	6min 21.01sec	Prince Alfred	Scotch		
2022	2000m	S.P.S.C.	6min 08.27sec	Prince Alfred	Scotch	St Peter's (4th VIII)	St Peter's (3rd VIII)
2023	2000m	Prince Alfred	6min 17.99sec	S.P.S.C.	St Peter's (3rd VIII)		

Schoolboy 1st IV – for The Cudmore Cup (2,000m)

Presented by Sir Collier Cudmore in 1966 as a perpetual trophy.

Sir Collier Cudmore (1885–1971) was a lawyer and politician was born into a South Australian pastoral family. He was educated St Peter’s College, University of Adelaide and Oxford University (Magdalen College).

Collier rowed for all three institutions as well as influencing the development of the Adelaide Rowing Club.

While at Oxford University, Collier rowed in a particularly fast Magdalen College four which represented Britain in the 1908 London Olympics. The crew won, consequently Collier was the first Australian sweep oarsman to win an Olympic Gold medal.

During First World War Collier commanded an Artillery battery in France and was twice seriously wounded.

Collier maintained active interest in School rowing as a coach and was the Chief Judge of the annual Schools’ Head off the River Regatta for several decades.

Collier believed that the Boys Open Four competition should have a trophy to recognise their particular efforts in school rowing and consequently he presented The Cudmore Cup as a perpetual trophy in 1966.

Year	Champion	Winning Time	2nd	3rd	4th	5th	6th	7th	8th
1978	St Peter's	Unknown							
1979	St Peter's	Unknown							
1980	Prince Alfred	Unknown							
1981	Prince Alfred	Unknown							
1982	Pulteney	Unknown							
1983	Unley HS	Unknown							
1984	Prince Alfred	Unknown							
1985	St Peter's	Unknown							
1986	St Peter's	Unknown							
1987	St Peter's	Unknown							
1988	St Peter's	Unknown							
1989	St Peter's	Unknown							
1990	Prince Alfred	Unknown							
1991	Prince Alfred	Unknown							
1992	CBC	Unknown							
1993	CBC	Unknown							
1994		Unknown							
1995		Unknown							
1996		Unknown							
1997		Unknown							
1998		Unknown							
1999		Unknown							
2000		Unknown							
2001		Unknown							
2002		Unknown							
2003		Unknown							
2004		Unknown							
2005		Unknown							
2006		Unknown							
2007		Unknown							
2008		Unknown							
2009		Unknown							
2010	St Peter's	7min 19.12sec	Pembroke	CBC	Prince Alfred	Scotch	Prince Alfred 2	Pulteney	
2011	Scotch	8min 08.65sec	Prince Alfred	St Peter's	Adelaide HS	Norwood	Pulteney		
2012	Prince Alfred	7min 08.20sec	St Peter's	Pulteney	Norwood	Unley HS			
2013	St Peter's	NTT	Prince Alfred	Pembroke	St Ignatius	Adelaide HS	Adelaide HS 2	CBC	
2014	Scotch	7min 52.74sec	Prince Alfred	Adelaide HS	St Peter's	Pembroke	Unley HS	CBC	
2015	Prince Alfred	7min 23.68sec	Prince Alfred 2	Unley HS	Scotch	CBC	Pulteney	Pembroke	St Peter's
2016									
2017	Norwood	7min 08.71sec	CBC	Prince Alfred	St Peter's	Unley HS	Pembroke	Prince Alfred 2	St Ignatius
2018	Adelaide HS	8min 14.25sec	Prince Alfred	St Ignatius	St Peter's 2	St Peter's 1	Prince Alfred 2	Norwood	Scotch
2019	Pembroke	7min 10.67sec	St Peter's	CBC	Prince Alfred	Unley HS	Adelaide HS	St Ignatius	
2020	St Peter's	7min 27.06sec	Prince Alfred	Scotch	Prince Alfred 2	St Peter's 2	Pulteney	Unley HS	
2021	Prince Alfred	7min 23.10sec	St Peter's	Pulteney	Unley HS	Scotch	CBC	Pembroke	Norwood
2022	St Peter's	6min 55.58sec	Unley HS	Adelaide HS	Prince Alfred	St Ignatius	Norwood	Pulteney	CBC
2023	St Peter's	7min 06.81sec	Prince Alfred	Scotch	Norwood	Unley HS	St Ignatius	Pulteney	

Boys Year 10A Quadruple Sculls - for The Menz Cup (1,500m)

- Originally rowed as U15 Tub fours, over 750m until ....?
- Rowed as sweep fours with cox (4+) from 1987 until ?
- Rowed s Quadruple Sculls with cox (4X+) from / onwards.

Year	Champion	Winning Time	2nd	3rd	4th	5th	6th	7th	8th
1978	St Peter's	Unknown							
1979	St Peter's	Unknown							
1980	Prince Alfred	Unknown							
1981	Prince Alfred	Unknown							
1982	Pulteney	Unknown							
1983	Unley HS	Unknown							
1984	Prince Alfred	Unknown							
1985	St Peter's	Unknown							
1986	St Peter's	Unknown							
1987	St Peter's	Unknown	Scotch						
1988	St Peter's	Unknown							
1989	St Peter's	Unknown							
1990	Prince Alfred	Unknown							
1991	Prince Alfred	Unknown							
1992	CBC	Unknown							
1993	CBC	Unknown							
1994									
1995									
1996									
1997									
1998									
1999	Pembroke	5min 46.3sec							
2000	Unley HS	5min 09.1sec							
2001	St Peter's College	5min 14.0sec							
2002	St Peter's College	5min 38.4sec							
2003	Scotch	5min 03.0sec							
2004	St Peter's College	5min 13.5sec							
2005	Unley HS	6min 06.0sec							
2006	St Peter's College	5min 11.0sec							
2007	Unley HS	5min 11.0sec							
2008	Pembroke	5min 31.0sec							
2009	Pembroke	5min 09.6sec							
2010	Prince Alfred	5min 06.3sec	Pulteney	Unley HS	CBC	St Peter's	Pembroke	Adelaide HS	Scotch
2011	Prince Alfred	5min 49.0sec	Pulteney	Pembroke	St Peter's	Norwood	Unley HS	CBC	Adelaide HS
2012	Prince Alfred	5min 10.3sec	Unley HS	Scotch	Pembroke	Pulteney	St Peter's	CBC	Adelaide HS
2013	Unley HS	5min 05.1sec	Prince Alfred	St Peter's	Scotch	Pulteney	Adelaide HS	Pembroke	Norwood
2014	Prince Alfred	5min 24.7sec	Pulteney	St Peter's	Unley HS	Scotch	CBC	Norwood	Pembroke
2015	CBC	5min 19.0sec	Unley HS	Pulteney	Scotch	St Peter's	Norwood	Pembroke	Prince Alfred
2016	Unley HS	5min 04.9sec	Pembroke	Scotch	Prince Alfred	St Peter's	Pulteney	St Ignatius	Adelaide HS
2017	Pembroke	5min 01.58sec	Pulteney	Prince Alfred	Scotch	Unley HS	CBC	St Peter's	Norwood
2018	Scotch	5min 37.83sec	Prince Alfred	St Peter's	Unley HS	Pulteney	Norwood		
2019	Prince Alfred	5min 12.07sec	Scotch	Unley HS	St Peter's	Pulteney	Pembroke		
2020	Race Cancelled due to Covid 19								
2021	Prince Alfred	5min 12.23sec	St Peter's	CBC	Scotch	Pulteney	Unley HS	Adelaide HS	Norwood
2022	Prince Alfred	5min 01.72sec	Scotch	St Peter's	Unley HS	Norwood	Pembroke	Adelaide HS	St Ignatius
2023	Pembroke	5min 03.18sec	Prince Alfred	Scotch	Pulteney	Unley HS	Adelaide HS	St Peter's	

- Boys Year 9A Quadruple Sculls – for The Ferguson Cup (1,000m)

Year	Champion	Winning Time	2nd	3rd	4th	5th	6th	7th	8th
2018	Prince Alfred	5min 37.83sec	St Peter's	Adelaide HS	Pembroke	Unley HS	Scotch		
2019	Scotch	3min 26.50sec	Prince Alfred	St Peter's	Unley HS	Adelaide HS	Norwood	Pembroke	
2020	Race Cancelled due to Covid 19								
2021	Prince Alfred	3min 24.10sec	Scotch	St Peter's	Unley HS	Norwood	Adelaide HS		
2022	Prince Alfred	3min 28.46sec	St Peter's	Scotch	Unley HS	Pembroke	Pulteney		
2023	Prince Alfred	3min 24.10sec	Scotch	St Peter's	Unley HS	Norwood	Adelaide HS		
2024	Unley HS	3min 45.06	CBC	Scotch	St Peter's	Prince Alfred	Adelaide HS		
2025									

WINNERS OF BOYS' EVENTS
Year	U14D	U14C	U14B	U14A	U15D	U15C	U15B	U15A	U16B	U16A	L/Wt IV	1st IV
1978			S.P.S.C.	S.P.S.C.				S.P.S.C.	A.H.S.	P.A.C.	Pembroke	P.A.C.
1979				S.P.S.C.		S.P.S.C.		S.P.S.C.	A.H.S.	S.P.S.C. / Pulteney	P.A.C.	Pulteney
1980			P.A.C.	P.A.C.			Pulteney	P.A.C.	Pulteney	Pulteney	S.P.S.C.	U.H.S.
1981			C.B.C.	P.A.C.			Pulteney	P.A.C.	Pulteney	S.P.S.C.	Pembroke	P.A.C.
1982			C.B.C.	Pulteney			Pulteney	Pulteney		S.P.S.C.	Scotch	Pembroke
1983			Pembroke	P.A.C.			Pulteney	C.B.C.		Pulteney	Pembroke	P.A.C.
1984			Pulteney	S.P.S.C.			S.P.S.C.	P.A.C.		Pulteney	Pembroke	Pembroke
1985			P.A.C.	P.A.C.			Pulteney	S.P.S.C.		P.A.C.	S.P.S.C.	P.A.C.
1986		Scotch	S.P.S.C.	U.H.S.		P.A.C.	Pulteney	S.P.S.C.		S.P.S.C.	S.P.S.C.	Pembroke
1987		P.A.C.	S.P.S.C.	P.A.C.		Pulteney	Pulteney	S.P.S.C.		S.P.S.C.	P.A.C.	Pulteney
1988		Pulteney	S.P.S.C.	S.P.S.C.		P.A.C.	Pulteney	S.P.S.C.		S.P.S.C.	Pulteney	U.H.S.
1989	S.P.S.C.	Pulteney	S.P.S.C.	S.P.S.C.	S.P.S.C.	Pulteney	P.A.C.	S.P.S.C.		Pulteney	Scotch	Pulteney
1990	P.A.C.	P.A.C.	Pembroke	P.A.C.	S.P.S.C. (1)	P.A.C.	Pulteney	P.A.C.		P.A.C.	Scotch	Pulteney
1991	S.P.S.C. (1)	S.P.S.C.	S.P.S.C.	S.P.S.C.	P.A.C. (1)	S.P.S.C.	P.A.C.	P.A.C.		P.A.C.	Pembroke	Scotch
1992		Scotch	Scotch	P.A.C.	S.P.S.C. (1)	S.P.S.C.	S.P.S.C.	C.B.C.		Pembroke	Pembroke	P.A.C.
1993	S.P.S.C.	S.P.S.C.	Pulteney	S.P.S.C.	S.P.S.C. (1)	S.P.S.C.	Pulteney	C.B.C.		P.A.C. (1)	Pembroke	A.H.S.

=== South Australian Head of the River – Girls Results ===
Girls Open First VIII – for The Florence Eaton Cup (2,000m)

Year	Champion	Winning Time	2nd	3rd	4th	5th	6th	7th	8th	9th	
1988	Unley HS	3min 25.00sec									
1989	Unley HS	5min 38.00sec									
1990	Scotch	7min 03.00sec									
1991	Walford	7min 03.00sec									
1992	Walford	7min 05.00sec									
1993	Walford	7min 04.00sec									
1994	Walford	6min 49.00sec									
1995	Walford	Unknown									
1996	Wilderness	Unknown									
1997	Walford	Unknown									
1998	Wilderness	Unknown									
1999	Walford	6min 57.3sec									
2000	Scotch	6min 48.9sec									
2001	Scotch	6min 49.0sec									
2002	Walford	7min 03.2sec									
2003	Wilderness	6min 50.0sec									
2004	Walford	6min 59.3sec									
2005	Pembroke	8min 00.0sec									
2006	Wilderness	6min 52.6sec	Pembroke	Pulteney							
2007	Walford	6min 56.4sec	Seymour	Wilderness							
2008	Walford	7min 04.4sec	Pembroke	Seymour							
2009	Seymour	6min 49.5sec	Walford	Wilderness							
2010	Walford	6min 48.1sec	Scotch	Pembroke	Seymour	Annesley	Wilderness	Unley HS	-		
2011	Walford	7min 58.0sec	Pembroke	Scotch	Seymour	Wilderness	Pulteney	Unley HS	-		
2012	Walford	6min 56.8sec	Pembroke	Scotch	Seymour	Wilderness	Pulteney	Unley HS	-		
2013	Walford	6min 51.4sec	Scotch	Wilderness	Pembroke	Seymour	Loreto	St Peter's Girls	-		
2014	Walford	7min 03.0sec	Scotch	Seymour / Loreto	-	Wilderness	Pembroke	St Peter's Girls	Unley HS		
2015	Scotch College	7min 08.5sec	Walford	Seymour	Loreto	Pembroke	St Peter's Girls	Wilderness	-		
2016	Seymour	6min 51.7sec	Loreto	Walford	Scotch	Pembroke	St Peter's Girls	Wilderness	Pulteney		
2017	Walford	6min 48.1sec	Scotch	Loreto	Pembroke	St Peter's Girls	Pulteney	Wilderness	Seymour	Adelaide HS	
2018	Walford	8min 02.4sec	Scotch	Seymour	Wilderness	St Peter's Girls	Pulteney	Pembroke			
2019	Scotch College	6min 58.5sec	Seymour	Walford	St Peter's Girls	Wilderness	Loreto	Pembroke	Unley HS	Norwood	
2020	Seymour	7min 14.43sec	Walford	St Peter's Girls	Scotch College	Wilderness	Pembroke	Pulteney	Unley HS		
2021	Scotch College	7min 05.55sec	Wilderness	Seymour	Walford	Pembroke	St Peter's Girls	Unley HS	Adelaide HS		
2022	Walford	6min 47.75sec*	Seymour	Loreto	Wilderness	Scotch	St Peter's Girls	Adelaide HS			
2023	Seymour	6min 48.48sec	Wilderness	Scotch	Walford	Loreto	Unley HS	Adelaide HS	Pembroke	Adelaide HS	Norwood

Girls Open 2nd VIII – for The Adelaide HS Centenary Cup (2,000m)

Year	Champion	Winning Time	2nd	3rd	4th	5th	6th	7th	8th
2010	Walford	7min 20.3sec	Pembroke	Wilderness					
2011	Walford	8min 39.1sec	Pembroke	Unley HS					
2012	Walford	7min 23.9sec	Pembroke	Wilderness	Seymour				
2013									
2014	Walford	7min 51.4sec	Wilderness						
2015	Walford	7min 20.5sec	Scotch	Pembroke	Seymour				
2016									
2017	Scotch	7min 20.1sec	Pembroke						
2018	Walford	8min 17.6sec	Scotch	Seymour					
2019	Walford	7min 17.7sec	Seymour	Scotch	Wilderness				
2020	Walford	7min 38.8sec	Scotch	Seymour	Wilderness	Pembroke	Unley HS		
2021	Seymour	7min 32.6sec	Walford	Scotch	Pembroke	Wilderness			
2022	Seymour	7min 01.65sec	Walford	Scotch	Wilderness				
2023	Scotch	7min 13.0sec	Seymour	Walford	Wilderness	Walford (3rd)			

Girls Year 10A Quadruple Sculls – for The Denise Collins Cup (1,500m)

Prior to 1993, race was rowed as U15A

Year	Champion	Winning Time	2nd	3rd	4th	5th	6th	7th	8th
1978	Unley HS	Unknown							
1979	Scotch	Unknown							
1980	Adelaide HS	Unknown							
1981	Scotch	Unknown							
1982	Scotch	Unknown							
1983	Unley HS	Unknown							
1984	Scotch	Unknown							
1985	Adelaide HS	Unknown							
1986	Adelaide HS	Unknown							
1987	Adelaide HS	Unknown							
1988	Unley HS	Unknown							
1989	Unley HS	Unknown							
1990	Scotch	Unknown							
1991	Unley HS	Unknown							
1992	Walford	Unknown							
1993	Pembroke	Unknown							
1994									
1995									
1996									
1997									
1998									
1999	Wilderness	5min 44.7sec							
2000	Walford	5min 45.1sec							
2001	Walford	5min 48.0sec							
2002	Pembroke	6min 22.2sec							
2003	Walford	5min 43.0sec							
2004	Scotch	5min 51.5sec							
2005	Wilderness	7min 15.3sec							
2006	Seymour	5min 53.0sec							
2007	Wilderness	6min 06.8sec							
2008	Scotch College	5min 59.5sec							
2009	Seymour	5min 42.3sec							
2010	Walford	5min 48.3sec	Annesley	Pembroke	Seymour	Wilderness	Norwood	Scotch	Adelaide HS
2011	Wilderness	6min 40.7sec	Pembroke	Scotch	Walford	Pulteney	Norwood	Seymour	Unley HS
2012	Walford	5min 57.3sec	Wilderness	Seymour	Scotch	Pulteney	Norwood	Loreto	Pembroke
2013	Walford	5min 40.4sec	Scotch	Pulteney	Wilderness	Loreto	Pembroke	Seymour	Unley HS
2014	Seymour	6min 03.4sec	Walford	Wilderness	Pembroke	Scotch	Unley HS	Adelaide HS	Loreto
2015	Walford	6min 05.3sec	Seymour	Unley HS	Pulteney	Norwood	Loreto	St Peter's Girls	-
2016	Loreto	5min 40.9sec	Scotch	St Peter's Girls	Pembroke	Pulteney	Seymour	Adelaide HS	Walford
2017	Scotch	5min 42.9sec	St Peter's Girls	Seymour	Walford	Unley HS	Wilderness	Adelaide HS	St Ignatius
2018	Walford	6min 35.2sec	Scotch	Adelaide HS	Loreto	Seymour	Unley HS	Wilderness	Pembroke
2019	Walford	6min 02.9sec	Seymour	St Peter's Girls	Scotch	Pembroke	Unley HS	Adelaide HS	Wilderness
2020	Not Rowed due to Covid 19								
2021	Loreto	5min 56.4sec	Scotch	Walford	Seymour	Wilderness	Norwood		
2022	Loreto	5min 39.86sec	Seymour	Walford	Pembroke	St Peter's Girls	Unley HS		
2023	Unley HS	5min 44.81sec	Seymour	Wilderness	Norwood	Pembroke	Walford	St Peter's Girls	Adelaide HS

WINNERS OF GIRLS' EVENTS
Year	U14B	U14A	U15B	U15A	U16	L/Wt IV	2nd IV	1st IV
1978				U.H.S.				Scotch
1979				Scotch				Scotch
1980				A.H.S.				U.H.S. (2)
1981			Scotch	Scotch		U.H.S.	U.H.S.	U.H.S.
1982			Scotch	Scotch		Scotch	U.H.S.	Pembroke
1983			U.H.S.	U.H.S.		Scotch	Scotch	Pembroke
1984			Scotch	Scotch		Scotch	Pembroke	Pembroke
1985			A.H.S.	A.H.S.		Scotch	U.H.S.	U.H.S.
1986			A.H.S.	A.H.S.		Pembroke	A.H.S.	Pembroke
1987		U.H.S.	U.H.S.	A.H.S.		U.H.S.	U.H.S.	U.H.S.
1988		U.H.S.	U.H.S.	U.H.S.		Pembroke	Scotch	Scotch
1989		Scotch	Wilderness	U.H.S.	Walford	Pembroke	Wilderness	Wilderness
1990	U.H.S.	U.H.S.	U.H.S.	Scotch	Pembroke	Walford		Wilderness
1991	Pembroke	Wilderness	U.H.S.	U.H.S.	Pembroke	Pembroke (1)		Scotch
1992	Wilderness	Wilderness	Wilderness	Walford	Pembroke	Pembroke		U.H.S.
1993	Wilderness	Wilderness	Pembroke (1)	Pembroke	Wilderness	Pembroke		Walford

== Queensland ==
=== Queensland Head of the River Regatta ===
The Head of the River for schoolboys is contested between seven of the nine GPS (Great Public Schools) schools in Brisbane, with schools Brisbane Boys College, Brisbane Grammar School, Brisbane State High School, Anglican Church Grammar School, St. Joseph's College, Gregory Terrace, The Southport School and St. Joseph's Nudgee College competing. The GPS Head of the River has been held since 1918, with Southport winning in the inaugural year. The races have been held on the Milton Reach of the Brisbane River, Wivenhoe Dam, Hinze Dam, Lake Kawana and now race at Wyaralong Dam. Crowds of several thousand attend the annual Championship Regatta at Lake Kawana but in earlier years there are reports of both sides of the river being lined with spectators and tens of thousands attending.

=== Queensland Girls Head of the River Regatta ===
On 13 October 1990 the Inaugural Schoolgirls' Head of the River was held on the Milton Reach of the Brisbane River. The seven schools that competed were All Hallows' School, Brisbane State High School, St Aidan's Anglican Girls' School, St Hilda's School, St Margaret's Anglican Girls' School, St Peters Lutheran College and Somerville House. Sixteen events were competed with 118 competitors and 3 entries in the Open 8+. The newly formed Brisbane Schoolgirls Rowing Association conducted the Head of the River with additional competitors from Brisbane Girls' Grammar School, Clayfield College, Indooroopilly State High School, Kelvin Grove State High School and Stuartholme School. By 1992, entries in the Open 8+ had doubled to six, the number of events expanded to 19 and 11 schools competed.

=== Bundaberg Head of the River Regatta ===
A 'Head of the River' competition is also held among Bundaberg schools. It is held on an annual basis and has been for the past 18 years. All Bundaberg secondary schools except for the Bundaberg Christian College participate in the regatta. These schools are Bundaberg North SHS, Bundaberg SHS, Kepnock SHS, St. Luke's Anglican College, Gin Gin SHS and Shalom Catholic College. St Luke's Anglican recently broke Shalom's twenty year winning streak over the other schools for the travel world overall points trophy with a score of 123, to 65.

== Victoria ==
=== VIC Head of the River Regatta ===
The Victorian race is contested between the 11 Associated Public Schools of Victoria (APS).

The race is usually the last race of the official APS rowing season and has recently been rowed on Lake Nagambie, which is a fully-buoyed international standard course, allowing six boat finals.

=== VIC Head of the Schoolgirls Regatta ===
1984 was the final year that girls from non-APS schools participated in the APS Head of the River. As a result of being barred from further competition in the APS regatta, the principal of Morongo Girls' College initiated a meeting that established the Head of School Girls’ Regatta (HOSG), founded on the principle that any school could compete. The first HOSG was held in 1985, on Lake Wendouree in Ballarat, with seven events, 16 participating schools and 240 competitors. In 1987, the event moved to the Barwon River in Geelong. In 1991, the HOSG Regatta Committee became an incorporated association. In 2013, the HOSG regatta was contested by 35 schools and 1766 competitors.

== Western Australia ==
=== WA Head of the River Regatta ===
The Perth race held in late summer/early autumn is contested between the 7 Public Schools Association members. The regatta consists of many races with points contributing to the Hamer Cup, and in the final race of the day, the 1st VIII crews from each school compete for the Head of the River trophy. Originally the race was run on the Swan River then Canning River, near Canning Bridge. Since 2009 the event has been held at the purpose built rowing course at Champion Lakes, Kelmscott. Records have tumbled since the venue change with records set in 2009 and 2010. The current record time for the 2000m event is 5 minutes 48.2 seconds set by Trinity College.

=== WA Head of the Schoolgirls Regatta ===
In the winter several private Perth girls schools race for the title.

== Tasmania ==
The Tasmanian Head of the River is currently held at the Lake Barrington Rowing Course. Held over the full championship distance, the schools associated with SATIS (Sports Association of Tasmanian Independent Schools) from both the north and south of the state compete for the event. The Hutchins School, Launceston Church Grammar, The Friends School, Guilford Young College, Scotch Oakburn College, St Patrick's College and St Brendan-Shaw College all compete in the boys race, while St Michael's Collegiate School, The Friends School, Fahan School, Scotch Oakburn College, St. Patrick's College, St Mary's College and Launceston Church Grammar all compete for the girls trophy.

The Head of the River regatta is often held the Saturday before Easter. However, in 2006 the Head of the River was postponed for the first time in its Tasmanian History with a limited regatta program being amalgamated in to the Tasmanian Masters Regatta. This was able to cater for the main races with Hutchins taking out the boys' Head of the River trophy and St Michael's Collegiate School the girls.

In 2007 Scotch Oakburn won their first Head of the River in a decade in a tight race with just a second between themselves, Launceston Church Grammar and The Hutchins School. The chance for Hutchins to claim their 5th consecutive title was denied. The Friends School came a distant 4th place after much hype. In the girls event the dominant Friends School crew won easily over Launceston Church Grammar with surprise combination coming from Fahan School gaining second place.

In 2008, The Hutchins School regained the title from Scotch Oakburn in a close race, with St Patricks college in third.

The following year, The Hutchins School won after being challenged all season by a strong St Patricks College crew. In third spot was Scotch Oakburn College.

In 2010 The Hutchins School won, having dominant performances throughout the season. Scotch Oakburn collected up second spot and the Friends crew came in third.

The 2011 Tasmanian School Boys Head of the River saw yet another dominant performance from The Hutchins School taking the win by 10 seconds from Scotch Oakburn with Friends placing third. In girls race the victors were Grammar with Scotch Oakburn placing second.

In 2012, the Head of the River Champions were Launceston Church Grammar for the girls and The Hutchins School for the boys.

In 2013, The underdog crew from Scotch Oakburn took out the Head of the River by a margin of 2 lengths to The Hutchins School, who had a dominant season and went into the race as favourites. This prevented Hutchins from a 6th title, and gave Scotch Oakburn their first win in 6 years. Closely in 3rd, The Friends School.

- First VIII – "Tasmanian School Boys Head of the River"

Year	Winner	2nd	3rd	Time
2007	Scotch Oakburn College, Tasmania	Launceston Church Grammar School	The Hutchins School	6.37.97
2008	The Hutchins School	Scotch Oakburn College, Tasmania	St Patrick's College	6.00.49
2009	The Hutchins School	St Patricks College	Scotch Oakburn College, Tasmania	6.28.84
2010	The Hutchins School	Scotch Oakburn College, Tasmania	The Friends School	6.03.13
2011	The Hutchins School	Scotch Oakburn College, Tasmania	The Friends School	6.06.64
2012	The Hutchins School	Scotch Oakburn College, Tasmania	Launceston Church Grammar School	6.07.16
2013	Scotch Oakburn College, Tasmania	The Hutchins School	The Friends School	6.01.91
2017	The Hutchins School	Scotch Oakburn College, Tasmania	The Friends School	5.54.12
2019	The Hutchins School	Scotch Oakburn College, Tasmania	Launceston Church Grammar School	6.04.71
