= Margaret Brown (disambiguation) =

Margaret Brown (1867–1932) was an American socialite and Titanic survivor.

Margaret Brown may also refer to:

- Margaret Brown (criminal) (c. 1828–?), New York criminal and thief
- Margaret Wise Brown (1910–1952), American author
- Margaret Brown (film director), American film director
- Margaret Brown (ichthyologist) (1918–2009), Indian-born British ichthyologist
- Margaret Brown (mathematics educator), British academic
- Margaret Lumley Brown (1886–1975), English occult figure
- Margaret Miller Brown (1903–1970), Canadian classical pianist and music educator
- Margaret Oliver Brown (1912–1990), Scottish painter and illustrator
- Maggie Brown (born 1948), American playwright, director and actress
- Margaret Sibella Brown (1866–1961), Canadian bryologist
- Margaret H. Brown (1887–1978), Canadian nurse and author
- Maggie Brown (singer) (born 1963), American singer, spoken word artist, and music producer
- Margaret Gillies Brown (1929–2022), Scottish poet and author
- Margaret Hamilton Brown (1858–1952), Scottish-born school founder and headmistress in Adelaide, Australia
- Peggy Olivia Brown (1934–2014), American non-profit founder and lecturer

== See also ==
- Kathleen Margaret Brown (born 1940), first woman in the Church of Ireland ordained to full-time ministry
- Margaret Browne (disambiguation)
