= Adelaide High School =

Coordinates: 34.92577°S 138.58661°E

Location
- West Terrace; Adelaide, South Australia, 5000; Australia

Information
- Type: Public
- Motto: Non scholae sed vitae (Not only for school, but for life)
- Established: 1908; 118 years ago
- Principal: Natasa Parhas
- Enrolment: 1820
- Campus: Urban
- Colour
- Affiliation: Sports Association for Adelaide Schools
- Architects: Edward B. Fitzgerald and John R. Brogan
- Website: http://www.adelaidehs.sa.edu.au/

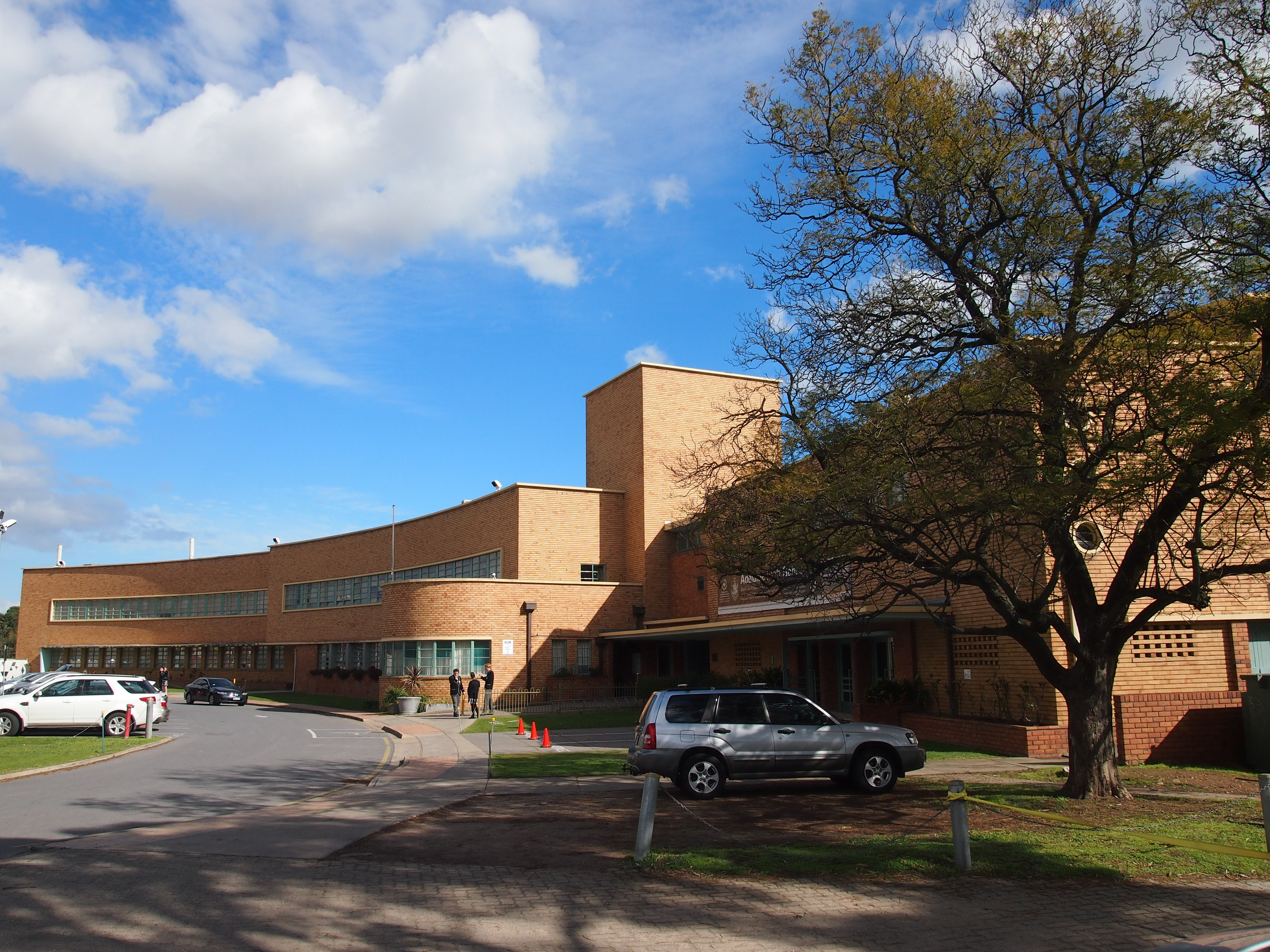
Adelaide High School, viewed from near the corner of West Terrace and Glover Avenue

Adelaide High School, originally named the Continuation School, is a state high school situated on the corner of West Terrace and Glover Avenue in the Adelaide Park Lands. Following the Advanced School for Girls, it was the second government high school in South Australia and the first coeducational public high school in that state. It was in 1951 split into Adelaide Boys' High School and Adelaide Girls' High School, until it was recombined back into Adelaide High School in 1976.

== History ==
In 1879, John Anderson Hartley, Director of Education, established the Advanced School for Girls in Grote Street, Adelaide. It was the first public high school in Australia, those in New South Wales following in the 1880s. Adelaide High was first named the Continuation School, but in April 1908 was renamed Adelaide High School, in the same year the South Australian state high school system was launched. The new school combined previous institutions: the Advanced School for Girls and the Pupil Teachers School. It also collected bursary-holders, and continuation students from the Grote Street Model School.

Adelaide High School was officially opened on 24 September 1908 by the premier of South Australia, Thomas Price. It was the first public secondary school in the Commonwealth of Australia. The headmaster from 1909 until 1919 was W. J. Adey, later Director of Education.

In 1927, it had an enrolment of 1,067 students, making it the largest school of its kind in the Commonwealth. By 1929, due to increasing enrolments, the school occupied two sites; one site was at Grote Street and the other was at Currie Street (now part of the Adelaide Remand Centre). Due to the increasing enrolments, it was decided that a new building was required for Adelaide High School. The current site of the school on West Terrace was originally set aside for an army barracks in 1849, but in 1859 an observatory was built instead, which then became the Bureau of Meteorology in 1939.

Based on an award-winning 1940 design by architects Edward B. Fitzgerald and John R. Brogan, a new building was erected on the site from 1947 to 1951. This became Adelaide Boys High School, while Adelaide Girls' High School remained in the buildings in Grote Street. Mary Veta Macghey was identified as the founding headmistress of Adelaide Girls High School. An application was made to have the building listed as a Historic Building on the Australian Register of the National Estate. The nomination was on the basis of the building's Art Modern style and significance in Adelaide education. It had not led to the building's listing on the register as of 2007. The original Grote Street school buildings were listed on the register as a Historic site in 1980. As of 2007, the buildings were used as a centre for the performing arts. The buildings were considered to be among the Nationally Significant 20th-Century Buildings in South Australia.

In 1976, due to decreasing enrolments at both the Boys' and the Girls' schools, amalgamation began with Adelaide High School operating on two campuses – one on Grote Street and one on West Terrace. This arrangement ended in 1979, when all students were on the West Terrace site. In 1979, Adelaide High School became South Australia's Special Interest Language School, with students able to study up to seven languages: French, German, Latin, Modern Greek, Chinese, Spanish and Italian. Latin ceased to be offered in 2004 and was replaced by Japanese. Auslan was added as the eighth language in 2018.

In 2008, Adelaide High School celebrated its 100th birthday.

Adelaide High School is part of the longest-running sporting exchanges with Melbourne High School and Mac.Robertson Girls' High School, both in Melbourne.

=== Architectural legacy ===
In 2026 the school was awarded the Jack Cheesman Award for Enduring Architecture by the South Australia Chapter of the Australian Institute of Architects. In July 2026, the school was shortlisted for the National Award for Enduring Architecture.

== Curriculum ==
=== Languages ===
Adelaide High School is known for being a Special Interest Language School, offering students outside the zone to enrol through one of the three Special Entry Programs (Languages, Cricket and Rowing). It offers its students eight different languages to study:

- Auslan
- Chinese
- Italian
- French
- German
- Japanese
- Modern Greek
- Spanish
- Vietnamese Background (Stage 1 & 2)

The school is also a Centre for the Hearing Impaired and an Associate School for Students of High Intellectual Potential. It has a Special Entry Program in its special interest cricket and rowing programs.

Adelaide High School is South Australia's only Special Interest Language School, and currently has sister schools around the world, including:

- Asahi High School in Osaka, Japan
- Heriburg Gymnasium in Coesfeld, North Rhine-Westphalia, Germany
- Lycée Saint Sauveur in Redon, Brittany, France
- IIS Quintino Sella in Biella, Italy
- IES La Sisla in Sonsecas, Spain
- Jinan Foreign Language School in Jinan, China
- Qingdao No 9 School in Qingdao, China
- 7th High School of Corfu, Greece

== Facilities ==
Student facilities include a library, gymnasium, tennis, basketball and netball courts, cricket nets, four ovals (shared with the Adelaide City Council), Performing Arts Centre, science labs and lecture theatres. The school also has a boatshed on the bank of the River Torrens which holds the school's many rowing boats and where the school's rowing crews train. It also has a shared rowing facility at West Lakes with Unley High School and Norwood Morialta High School. A new wing, the Charles Todd Wing, was added to the southern side of the school in 2015. Building 4, previously housing the Languages, Art and Library areas, was upgraded and now contains the Languages, Maths and Arts learning areas. In 2019, the school self-funded a Performing Arts Centre Refurbishment and in 2021, also saw a $24 million build in the centre of the school, to accommodate the large intake of Year 7 students into the school.

== Sport ==
=== Houses and special sport programs ===
The school has four houses, which students represent in sporting and other events within the school. The houses took their names from past principals of the school. The house names are: Adey (red), Macghey (blue), Morriss (green), and West (yellow). Sporting events include the intra-house swimming carnival and athletics carnival. The houses compete for the SJ Dowdy Cup, named after former Principal Stephen Dowdy.

Adelaide High School has a range of girls' and boys' sporting teams and offers special interest sporting programs including cricket and rowing. The Adelaide High School cricket program provides the opportunity for talented cricketers from outside the school zone to enrol at the school, similar to the Adelaide High School rowing club, which incorporates a talent identification selection process whereby students from outside the school zone can apply to enrol at the school.

Both special entry programs participate in games and regattas throughout the year which lead up to the main events. The 5 Highs Cricket Carnival is held in December against Melbourne High School, Sydney Boys High School, Brisbane State High School and Kent Street Senior High School. The major rowing event is the Head of the River Regatta held in March or April. This regatta was jointly founded in 1922 by Adelaide High School and St Peter's College. Other sporting trips have the volleyball teams travelling to the Australian Volleyball Schools Cup in Melbourne, in December.

=== Exchanges ===
Since 1913, Adelaide High has taken part in a sporting exchange with Mac.Robertson Girls' High School and since 1910, Melbourne High School. This is the longest-running sporting exchange in the state. Both exchanges compete for the Prefects' Cup. The exchanges are held in early Term 3 (July-August) and each year the venue swaps. There are competitions in sports such as: Australian rules football, soccer, tennis, rowing, basketball, netball, softball, chess, debating, theatre sports, volleyball, cross country/athletics, badminton, table tennis and hockey. Sports previously played against Melbourne included lacrosse, baseball and field hockey.

Adelaide High School is a member of the Sports Association for Adelaide Schools (SAAS).

== Headmasters / principals ==
Name	Years	Ref(s)
William Adey	1908–1920	
Reginald A. West	1920–1948	
Cyril M. Ward	1948	
Alfred E. Dinning	1949–1954	
Wybert M. C. Symonds	1954–1962	
A. H. Campbell	1963–1968	
W. J. Bentley	1969–1977	
Colin H. Brideson OAM	1978–1987	
Peter Sanderson	1988–1997	
Stephen Dowdy	1998–T1 2011	
Anita Zocchi	T2 2011–T1 2017	
Michael Gurr	T2 2017	
Cezanne Green	T3 2017–T3 2024	
Connie Priolo	T4 2024–2025	
Natasa Parhas	2026–Present	

== Notable staff and students ==
- Sir Don Anderson (1917–1975) – Director-General of the Department of Civil Aviation
- Lynn Arnold (b. 1949) – Premier of South Australia
- Nick Bolkus (b. 1950) – South Australian Senator and Cabinet Minister
- Ralph Clarke (b. 1951) – South Australian Deputy Opposition Leader
- Hugh Cairns (1896–1952) – First Nuffield Professor of Surgery, Oxford University
- John Stuart Dowie (1915–2008) – Artist
- Anne Haddy (1930–1999) – Actress (best known for her role as Helen Daniels in Neighbours)
- Barbara Hall (b. circa 1931) – Physicist in 1956. one of two women first to receive a PhD from the University of Adelaide; mother of Hugh Possingham
- Bob Hank (1923–2012) – Dual Magarey Medallist
- Margaret Hubbard (b. 1924) – First woman to win the Hentford Scholarship for Latin at Oxford
- Tom Koutsantonis (b. 1971) – South Australian Treasurer
- Brian Ross Martin (b. 1947) – Chief Justice of the Northern Territory
- Jim May (1934–2023) – Australian chemical engineer and metallurgist
- Sir Mark Oliphant AC, KBE, FRS, FAA, FTSE (1991-2000) - Governor of South Australia (1971-1976), Nuclear Physicist
- Neil Page (b. 1944) – Australian baseball representative/player
- Greig Pickhaver – aka H.G. Nelson, actor, comedian and writer
- Oswald Rishbeth (1886–1946) – Geographer, taught at Adelaide High in 1910
- Sia (b. 1975) – Pop singer and songwriter
- David Vigor (1939–1998) – South Australian Senator
