= William Adey =

Australian educationist and public servant (1874–1956)

William Adey CMG
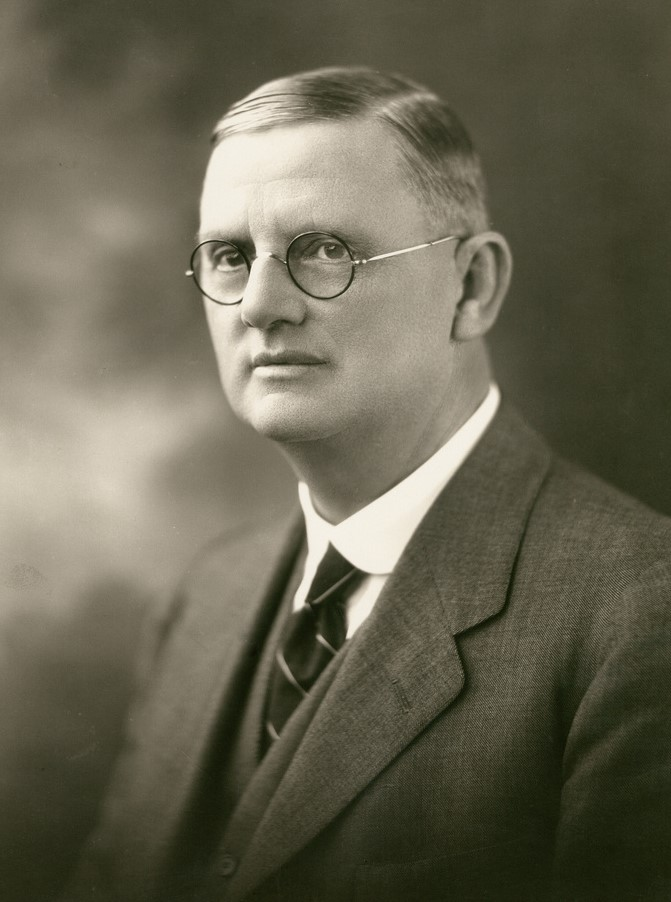
- Adey in 1930
- Born: William James Adey; May 27, 1874; Clare, South Australia, Australia
- Died: May 23, 1956 (aged 81)
- Occupation(s): Educationist, public servant
- Title: Director of Education (1929–1939); Headmaster of Adelaide High School (1909–1919)
- Parents: Charles George Adey; Ann Adey (née Ritchie)
- Awards: Companion of the Order of St Michael and St George (1935)

William James Adey CMG (27 May 1874 – 23 May 1956) was an Australian educationist and public servant.

== Early life and education ==
Adey was born near Clare in South Australia to farmer Charles George Adey and Ann, née Ritchie. He attended state primary schools before studying at Grote Street Training College in 1894 and at Melbourne Training College in 1907; he also studied part-time at the University of Adelaide (1909–15), although he never graduated.

== Career ==
He worked as a primary school teacher from 1895 to 1909 in various schools.

In 1909 Adey was appointed inaugural headmaster of Adelaide High School, a position he held until 1919. He was inspector of high schools from 1919 to 1920 before becoming superintendent of secondary education. In 1929 he became Director of Education, although he was the second choice and was instructed to limit himself to following his predecessor's plan; not a reformer, he followed this directive, but his administrative and teaching ability was widely admired. He attracted greatest attention for his role in the 1931 committee of inquiry, in which he dissented from his colleagues in opposing higher school fees and more limited high school admission. He was unable to prevent the introduction of school fees altogether but attempted to offset the social inequality they caused. He remained Director of Education until his retirement in 1939. Charles Fenner was his successor.

Adey served on the council of the University of Adelaide from 1929 to 1950 and chaired a 1939 government committee inquiring into delinquent children and state wards. He was appointed Companion of the Order of St Michael and St George (CMG) in 1935.

== Personal life ==
He married Mabel Edith Dyer on 17 December 1910; she died in 1915 and Adey then married fellow teacher Constance Margaret Weston on 7 May 1921 at Walkerville. Adey died at Burnside in 1956 and was buried at North Road Cemetery in Nailsworth.
