= Cliff Hawkins =

Australian real estate agent (1932–2016)

Cliff Hawkins AM
- Born: Clifford Hawkins; March 10, 1932; Adelaide, South Australia
- Died: July 15, 2016 (aged 84); Adelaide, South Australia
- Education: Unley High School
- Known for: Real estate
- Title: Member of the Order of Australia

Cliff Hawkins AM (10 March 1932 - 15 July 2016) was a real estate agent and valuer based in Adelaide, South Australia.

Commencing work at the Lands Titles Office as a draftsman, at the age of 17 Hawkins became the youngest person in the state to qualify as a licensed land broker (now licensed conveyancer). Hawkins subsequently joined the established real estate firm of KJ Powell as a land broker. Hawkins established his real estate business in Adelaide in 1958. Aside from activity in Adelaide and McLaren Vale, his business established a presence on Kangaroo Island, South Australia from 1963 until 2022. In 1966 he became the youngest ever councillor in the Real Estate Institute of South Australia, and in 1981 its youngest ever life member. In June 1988, he became a Member of the Order of Australia for his service to the real estate industry and the community.

In 2000, the South Australian Attorney General appointed Hawkins to a government review panel to report on the National Competition Policy with respect to land agents.

In 2007, Hawkins was recognised by the Real Estate Institute of Australia, being conferred the President's Award honouring outstanding performance, commitment and contributions to the real estate profession.

Hawkins received government appointments to the Land Agents' Board, Commercial Tribunal and the board of the State Transport Authority in South Australia. Outside of real estate, Hawkins was President of Sturt Football Club from 1985 to 1986 and is a life member of the council of Westminster School, Adelaide.

== Sources ==
- Kangaroo Island... The First 200 Years (Instalment 16) Neville Cordes (2007) Statewide & Global ISBN 0-909630-37-2
- Real History - The Real Estate Institute of South Australia 1919-1989 Peter Donovan and Alison Painter (1990) Real Estate Institute of South Australia ISBN 0-646-02056-0
- Prime Property - Success Secrets from Australia's Real Estate Leaders Tony Hall (2001) Navigator ISBN 0-957874-20-0
