= Head of the River =

Head of the River may refer to more than one type of rowing competition:

- Bumps race
  - Eights Week, Oxford University (May)
  - Lent Bumps, Cambridge University (February–March)
  - May Bumps, Cambridge University (June)
  - Torpids, Oxford University (March)
- Head race
- Head of the River Amstel (the Netherlands)
- Head of the River (Australia)
- Head of the River (New South Wales)
- Head of the River (Victoria)
- Head of the River (Western Australia)
- Head of the River Race, London
- Women's Eights Head of the River Race, London

== See also ==
- Riverhead (disambiguation)
