= Margaret Browne =

Margaret Browne may refer to:

- Margaret Fitzhugh Browne (1884–1972), American painter of portraits
- Margaret Stuart (poet), née Browne (1889–1963), British poet and writer
- Margaret Browne (swimmer) in Swimming at the 1979 Summer Universiade

== See also ==
- Margaret Brown (disambiguation)
- Browne (surname)
