= Tom Daly (basketball) =

Australian basketball player

Mount Gambier Pioneers
- Title: Head coach
- League: NBL1 South

Personal information
- Born: 16 February 1991 (age 35) Adelaide, South Australia, Australia
- Listed height: 186 cm (6 ft 1 in)
- Listed weight: 85 kg (187 lb)

Career information
- High school: Unley (Adelaide, South Australia)
- Playing career: 2009–2024
- Position: Point guard
- Coaching career: 2025–present

Career history

Playing
- 2009–2012: Sturt Sabres
- 2010–2013: Adelaide 36ers
- 2013–2019; 2021–2024: Mount Gambier Pioneers
- 2014–2015: Adelaide 36ers

Coaching
- 2025: Mount Gambier Pioneers (assistant)
- 2027–: Mount Gambier Pioneers

Career highlights
- 3× SEABL champion (2014, 2015, 2017); SEABL Grand Final MVP (2017); All-SEABL Second Team (2017); Central ABL champion (2010); Central ABL MVP (2012); Central ABL Woollacott Medalist (2012); 2× Central ABL / Premier League All-Star Five (2012, 2019); Central ABL Frank Angove Medalist (2010)

Thomas Daly (born 16 February 1991) is an Australian basketball coach and former player, best known for his 10 seasons playing for the Mount Gambier Pioneers in the South East Australian Basketball League (SEABL) and NBL1 South. He is currently head coach of the Mount Gambier Pioneers in the NBL1 South.

== Early life ==
Daly was born in Adelaide, South Australia, and attended Unley High School.

== Playing career ==
Daly made his semi-professional debut in 2009 with the Sturt Sabres of the Central Australian Basketball League. He helped the Sabres win the 2010 Central ABL championship, scoring 26 points in the final. He was also the Frank Angove Medalist in 2010 which is awarded to best U/23 player in Central ABL.

Following the 2010 Central ABL season, Daly joined the Adelaide 36ers as a development player for the 2010–11 NBL season. Due to injuries in the 36ers squad, Daly saw increased playing time over the season. He averaged 2.2 points in 8.35 minutes in 13 games.

After playing a third season in the Central ABL with the Sabres, Daly re-joined the 36ers as a development player for the 2011–12 NBL season and in 12 games, he averaged 1.8 points per game.

With the Sabres in 2012, Daly won the Woollacott Medal for fairest and most brilliant in the Central ABL. He was also named the Most Valuable Player and All-Star Five.

Daly was again one of the 36ers' development players going into the 2012–13 NBL season. In December 2012, he was elevated to the main roster after import C. J. Massingale was released. In 17 games, he averaged 2.6 points and 1.1 rebounds per game.

In 2013, Daly joined the Mount Gambier Pioneers of the South East Australian Basketball League (SEABL). In 2014, he helped the Pioneers win the SEABL championship.

On 10 September 2014, Daly signed a full-time contract with the 36ers for the 2014–15 NBL season. He scored 19 points in 27 games.

Between 2015 and 2018, Daly played for the Pioneers in the SEABL and won two more championships in 2015 and 2017. He averaged 16.7 points, 3.2 rebounds and 4.9 assists per game in 2017 and was named in the all SEABL team and won the Grand Final MVP.

In 2019, Daly played for the Pioneers in the Premier League.

Daly joined the Pioneers for their debut season in the NBL1 South in 2021. He continued with the Pioneers in the 2022, 2023 and 2024.

=== National team ===
In June 2009, Daly represented Australia at the FIBA Oceania Basketball Tournament in Saipan. The team went undefeated in the round robin and finals, going 6–0 to win the gold medal. Daly was named in the All Star Five for the tournament.

In August 2011, Daly played for the Australian University National Team at the World University Games in Shenzhen.

== Coaching career ==
After retiring as a player at the end of the 2024 season, Daly joined Richard Hill's coaching staff as an assistant for the Mount Gambier Pioneers in 2025. In 2026, he was appointed Coaching Director of Basketball Mount Gambier.

In August 2026, Daly was appointed head coach the Pioneers for the 2027 NBL1 season. He continued in his Coaching Director position alongside his NBL1 South responsibilities.
