= Mary Veta Macghey =

Australian headmistress (1897–1970)

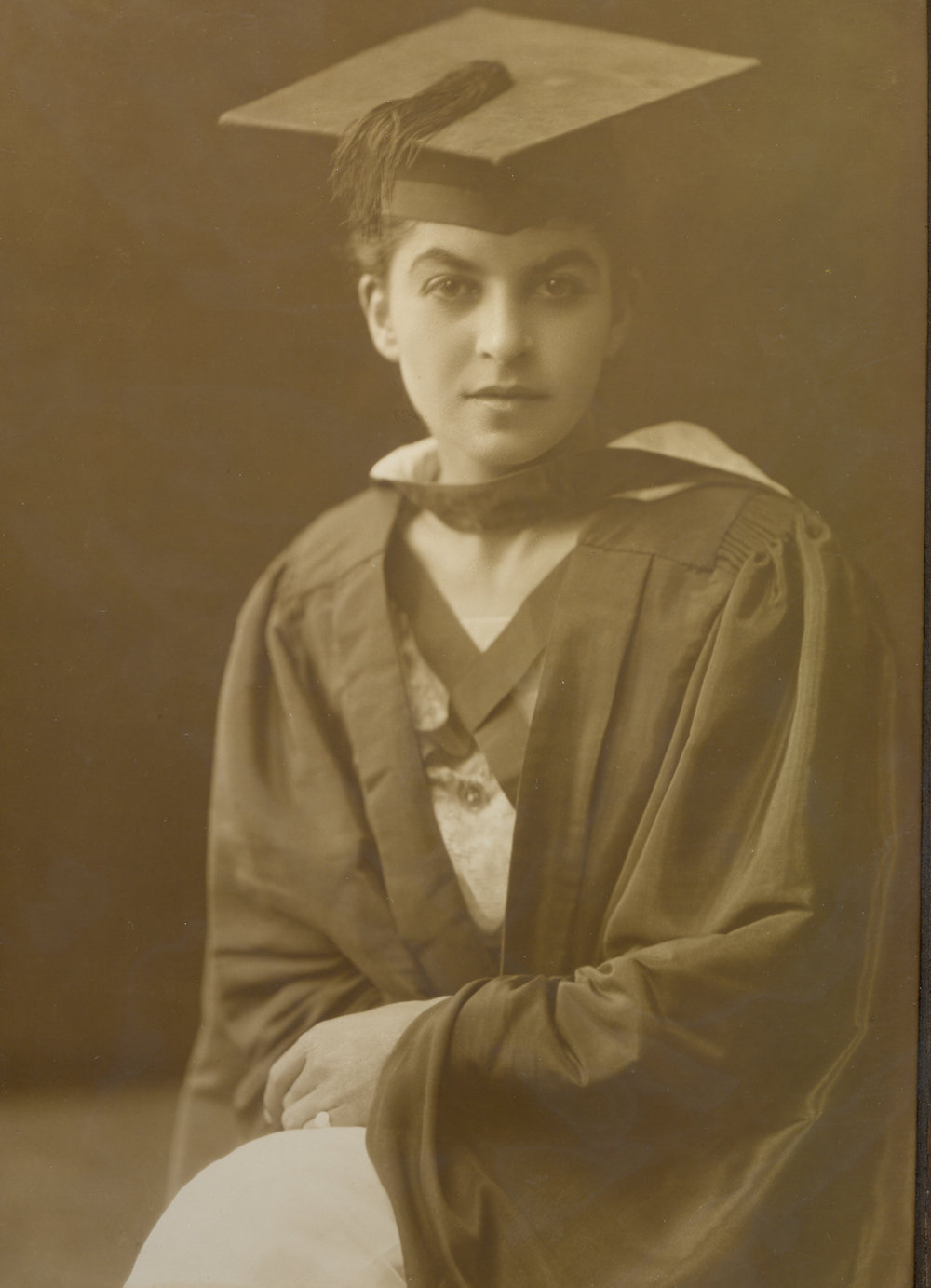
- in 1912 in Adelaide – by Van Dyke
- Born: January 1897; Adelaide
- Died: December 20, 1970 (aged 73); Wattle Park
- Education: Adelaide High School, University of Adelaide
- Occupation: headteacher
- Known for: founding head
- Partner: Maud "Borbie" Evans McFarlane

Mary Veta Macghey (January 1897 – 20 December 1970) was an Australian headmistress. She was a leading campaigner for equal pay for women in the South Australian Institute of Teachers.

== Life ==
Macghey may have been born in Adelaide around the start of 1897. She was brought up by Martha Mary (born Winstanley) and Patrick Macghey. They fostered children, but they adopted Mary in 1903 agreeing to bring her up as a Catholic. Her biological parents were a man called Filgy and a woman named Mary Veta. Her mother had given her up to the authorities as she could not care for her.

Macghey was educated at Adelaide High School, at the Teachers' Training College and at the University of Adelaide. She gained her first degree in 1919 and then she studied in her own time to obtain a master's degree in 1930.

In 1951 the Adelaide Girls' High School was created and Macghey was its founding headmistress as it was formed by splitting the co-educational Adelaide High School that R A West had led. The boys' school had a new building but the newly formed girls' school was in a variety of buildings. One building had been the Grote Street Model School, another the Teacher Training College and another the Advanced School for Girls which dated from 1877.

She wrote for the South Australian Women Teachers' Guild's paper and she was its president in 1949. She was a founding member of the South Australian Institute of Teachers in 1950. She is credited together with Jean Pavy and Miss Tomlinson in leading the campaign for Australian women teachers to receive equal pay.

Macghey retired in 1959 but she continued to teach at the Presbyterian Girls' College, Adelaide and Henley Beach High School. The change was made in 1965 to give men and women teachers equal pay and other groups of women employees followed that lead.

Macghey died in the Adelaide suburb of Wattle Park in 1970. Adelaide Girls' High School has a house named for her and the South Australian Institute of Teachers have a Macghey House.
