= Leon Carmen =

Australian author

Leon Carmen (born 1949) is an Australian author who is best known for the literary hoax that resulted from his authorship of the novel My Own Sweet Time—which he wrote under the pseudonym "Wanda Koolmatrie".

== Background ==
Carmen grew up in Torrens Park in Adelaide and attended Unley High School. His father died when he was fourteen.

Carmen married at age 20, however the marriage ended in divorce.

He played keyboard in various bands including Red Angel Panic, and has had a number of jobs, including: public servant, taxi-driver, and fruit-picker.

In around 1995, Carmen moved to Sydney.

== My Own Sweet Time ==
In 1994 the Aboriginal publishing house Magabala Books published My Own Sweet Time, supposedly a biographical account by the author Wanda Koolmatrie—an Aboriginal woman born to the Pitjantjatjara people in 1949. The book details how Koolmatrie was taken from her mother in 1950 to be raised by white foster parents, and thus became one of the Stolen Generations. In 1996 the author received the Dobbie Literary Award for the work.

When Koolmatrie offered Magabala a sequel to the book in 1997, the publisher discovered the hoax and the affair was made public. The fact that "Koolmatrie" turned out to be a white Australian taxi driver named Leon Carmen turned into a "national scandal". In a later interview, Carmen said that he was trying to break into the literary market and believed he could not have got his book published without the subterfuge.

Carmen states that his friend and agent, John Bayley, was aware of the plan to write the work under a pseudonym, and helped to select the novel's title. In 1997, a "Brief of Evidence" regarding "the 'Wanda' Case" was compiled by the NSW Police against Bayley. In 2004 Bayley published a book about the affair, Daylight Corroboree: A first-hand account of the "Wanda Koolmatrie" hoax.

The first edition of My Own Sweet Time included supportive quotes on the rear cover from the Australian author Dorothy Hewett and from the Australian academic and author Philip Morrissey—without the latter's permission. The work was included in an anthology of Australian autobiography, and was used as a text for the NSW Higher School Certificate examination.
