= Riverhead =

Riverhead may refer to:

- River source, the headwaters of a river or stream

== Business ==
- Riverhead Books, a division of Penguin Group
- Riverhead Networks, a computer security company
- Riverhead Raceway, an auto race track in Riverhead, New York

== Media and entertainment ==
- Riverhead (album), by Goldenhorse, 2002
- Riverhead (film), a 2016 Canadian movie directed by Justin Oakey
- Riverhead (soundtrack), a soundtrack album from the film, by Ulver

== Places ==
=== Canada ===
- Riverhead, Newfoundland and Labrador, Canada
- Riverhead, Nova Scotia, a community in the Canadian province of Nova Scotia

=== New Zealand ===
- Riverhead, New Zealand

=== United Kingdom ===
- Riverhead, Kent, England

=== United States ===
- Riverhead (CDP), New York, United States
- Riverhead (town), New York, United States
  - Riverhead (LIRR station), a Long Island Rail Road station

== See also ==
- Head of the River (disambiguation), several rowing competitions
- Head River, a river in southern Ontario
