= Jinan Foreign Language School =

- 济南外国语学校
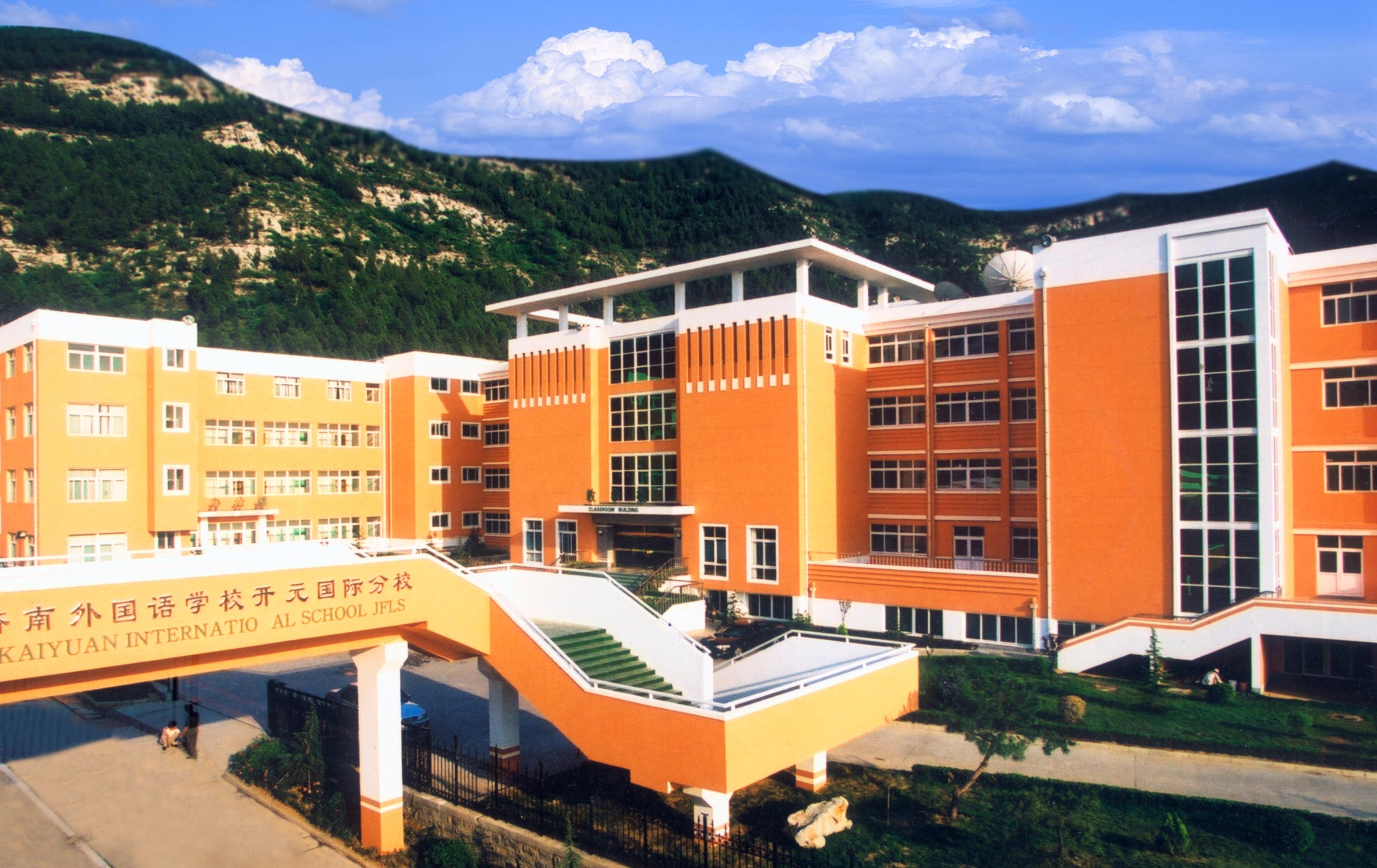
- Jinan, Shandong; China

Information
- School type: Secondary school
- Motto: 人文天下 行者无疆 (Humanities in the world, travelers without borders)
- Established: 1989
- Website: jnfls.jinan.cn

Jinan Foreign Language School (JNFLS; 济南外国语学校) is a secondary school in Jinan, Shandong, China. The original campus of the school is a public school managed by the Jinan City Education Bureau. Nevertheless, the school signed numerous contracts with for-profit companies to establish branch schools under the school's name, which are all private-owned.

== Branch schools ==
In March 1996, Jinan Foreign Languages School signed a contract with Shandong Sanjian Real Estate Group Corporation to establish the private Jinan Foreign Languages School Sanjian School (济南外国语学校三箭分校).

In December 1999, Jinan Foreign Languages School signed a contract with Jinan Huanshan Real Estate Development Co., Ltd. to establish the private Jinan Foreign Languages School Kaiyuan International Branch (Primary School).

In November 2004, Jinan Foreign Languages School signed a contract with Jinan Waihai Real Estate Development Co., Ltd., responsible for dispatching an educational management team to implement all-round management of Jinan Waihai Experimental School. According to the contract, Kaiyuan International Branch and Waihai Experimental School serve as the student source base of Jinan Foreign Languages School (Sanjian Branch).
