= Margaret Gillies Brown =

Scottish poet and author

- Born: 23 July 1929
- Died: January 25, 2022 (aged 92)
- Occupations: Poet and writer
- Writing career
- Period: 1978-2016
- Subjects: Poetry, autobiography
- Notable works: Looking Towards the Light (1988); Far from the Rowan Tree (1998)
- Notable awards: Scottish Arts Council Award 1988, 1998

Margaret Gillies Brown (23 July 1929 – 25 January 2022) was a Scottish poet and author. She published several volumes of poetry as well as a three-volume autobiography. Both explored life as a farmer, in Canada and Scotland, and raising a large family.

== Early life ==
Gillies Brown was born Margaret Isobel Pollock in Longniddry, East Lothian on 23 July 1929. Her parents were Jessie and Henry Pollock, a sales rep. As a child, she was often ill and missed school, and she started writing poetry and prose to amuse herself. She lived in Dundee during World War II. She considered a career in journalism but instead trained as a nurse in Dundee, working at the Dundee Royal Infirmary from 1949 to 1953.

Her first husband, Ronald Gillies, was a sheep farmer in the Sidlaws. They had seven children together, Richard, Michael, Ronald, Mahri, Grant, Lindsay and Kathleen. The family migrated to Alberta, Canada for three years, before returning to Scotland for Ronald to take over his family's farm in the Carse of Gowrie, Perthshire. She was widowed in 1982 and later married again, to Henry Brown.

== Writing career ==
Gillies Brown began writing poetry again when her youngest child went to school. She was a founder member of the Perthshire Writers' Group and was later made their honorary president. Her work explores themes of everyday family and farming life, and a love of nature, in an accessible way using Scots dialect. Her poetry was well-received and received awards from the Scottish Arts Council for Looking towards Light (1988) and Far from the Rowan Tree (1998). As well as her own volumes, her work has been included in collections of Scottish women's poetry, including An Anthology of Scottish Women Poets.

Gillies Brown also wrote three volumes of autobiography, which were initially serialised in The Courier newspaper. A Rowan Tree in my Garden captured her wartime experiences in Dundee, Far from the Rowan Tree recalls farming life in Canada in the 1950s, and Around the Rowan Tree focused on the family's return to Scotland and life as a farmer's wife and mother of seven. The Wind in Her Hands explores her mother's childhood in rural Aberdeenshire.

== Later life and death ==
Gillies Brown spent her later life in a timber cabin near the family farm and the Cairn O'Mohr winery, which is owned by her son Ron Gillies. In 2017, a selection of Gillies Brown's poetry was recorded on a CD called The Lass o' Gowrie: a celebration for Margaret Gillies Brown by The Scottish Language Society. Aged 90, she said she would like her work to be seen in the tradition of poets Lady Nairne, Violet Jacob, Marion Angus and Helen Cruikshank.

Gillies Brown died aged 92 on 25 January 2022 at her home in the Carse of Gowrie.

== Bibliography ==
=== Poetry ===
- Give me the Hill-Run Boys (Outposts, 1978)
- The Voice in the Marshes (Outposts, 1979)
- Hares on the Horizon (Outposts, 1980)
- No Promises: poems (Akros, 1984)
- Looking Towards Light (Blind Serpent Press, 1988)
- Footsteps of the Goddess: poems (Akros, 1994)
- Of Rowan and Pear: poems of rural Scotland, with Kenneth Steven (Argyll, 2000)
- The Sang o the Mavis (Diehard, 2008)
- Ilka Spring (Diehard, 2016)

=== Autobiography ===
- Far From The Rowan Tree (Argyll Publishing, 1998)
- A Rowan Tree In My Garden
- Around The Rowan Tree (Argyll Publishing, 1999)

=== Biography ===
- The Wind in Her Hands (Argyll Publishing, 2002)
