= Peggy Olivia Brown =

American academic (1934–2014)

- Born: March 5, 1934; Washington, D.C
- Died: February 3, 2014 (aged 79)

Peggy Olivia Brown was a non-profit founder in Boston and a lecturer at Northeastern University and Boston College. Brown was born in Washington, D.C. and grew up in New York City.

Brown graduated from the High School of Art & Music in New York City, and received a bachelor's degree in English literature, drama, and education from Howard University in 1956. She then received a master's degree in English literature and education from City College of New York, and a doctorate in education from Teachers College, Columbia University. While working as a lecturer, Brown also worked as a public relations consultant for the Organization of American States, the U.S. Department of Health, Education, and Welfare, and the City Council in Washington, D.C.

Brown founded the Mandela Town Hall Spot Youth Program for impoverished youth and adults in Roxbury. The youth program was mainly sponsored by the Boston Red Sox. Brown also founded the Mandela Crew, the first African American and Latino team to compete in the Head of the Charles regatta.

In 2023, she was recognized as one of "Boston’s most admired, beloved, and successful Black Women leaders" by the Black Women Lead project.
