= Margaret H. Brown =

Canadian nurse, missionary, and author

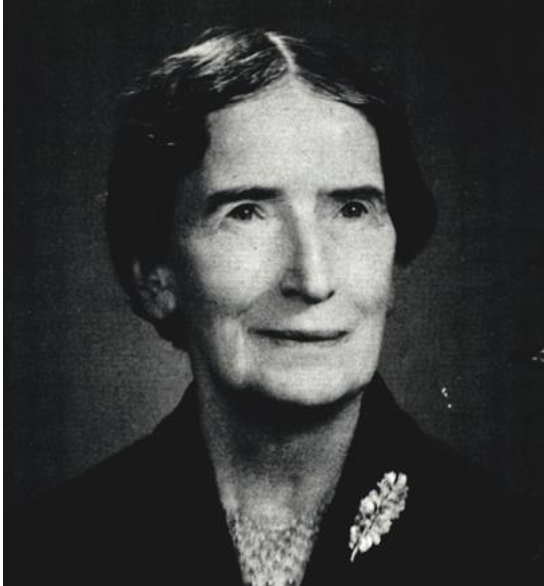
Margaret Brown

Margaret Brown (1887–1978) was a Canadian nurse, missionary, and author who worked in clinics in China. She created schools for girls and women, taught Chinese nurses, built houses, did religious missionary work, and worked for the Christian Literature Society in Shanghai. She also founded The Women’s Star magazine.

== Early life ==
Margaret Brown was born in 1887 near Tiverton in Kincardine Township, Ontario, Canada and had a religious upbringing. She completed her B.Paed. and M.A. degrees and began her career as a teacher. Before starting missionary work in Henan, China she had taught for four years in Canada.

== Missionary service ==
Margaret Brown's missionary service was mainly at Tak Ding Hospital in Fuzhou. In Tak Ding she built housing for nurses, so they could live closer to the hospital. While there she learned the Fuzhou dialect in order to communicate with natives and used this to teach nursing skills to Chinese nurses in training.

She also worked at a clinic in Yong Peng, Malaysia that opened in 1953. She returned to Canada from medical missionary service in 1956.

During her time in China, she was known as ‘’Bo Yuzehen’’.

== Writing ==
Margaret Brown published several books. The most notable books she published were Stories of Jesus and Mrs. Wang’s Diary. In addition, she wrote letters and articles about her work in China which eventually helped compile a greater picture of the work Canadian nurses did in China. Her writing was particularly helpful in compiling Healing Henan: Canadian Nurses at the North China Mission by Sonya Grypma. She wrote a 1,500 page account of the mission work and titled it History of the North China Mission. Eventually she was appointed to the Christian Literature Society in 1929.

== Work with Chinese women ==
Margaret Brown also did work with Chinese women during her missions. Her most notable accomplishments were opening a girls’ school in 1917 and a women's school in 1921. These schools helped train Chinese nurses. In addition, she founded a publication called The Women’s Star magazine in 1932. The magazine was intended to be for newly literate Chinese women. She was an editor for the magazine in 1941.

== Spiritual legacy ==
Margaret Brown's work also had religious intentions. She taught religious practices and prayers to patients and preached in the wards. Before her medical missionary work she was a religious missionary in North China with the Women's Society of the Presbyterian Church in Canada. She believed in healing bodies and souls.

== Publications ==
Brown’s publications include;

- Wang fu jen de jih chi (1929)
- Mrs Wang’s Diary (1936)
- Heaven Knows (1938)
- Tian xiao de (1939)
- Mrs Wang’s daughter-in-law (1940)
- Ah Wang (1941)
- Pictorial Life of Paul (1951)
- 萬兒之母 (1953)
- MacGillivray of Shanghai: the life of Donald MacGillivray (1968)
- History of the Honan (North China) mission of the United Church of Canada

== Bibliography ==
- Lawrie, Bruce R. (1982) The East Asian Missionary Papers at the United Church of Canada Archives, Victoria College, University of Toronto of East Asian Libraries: Vol. 1982: No. 67, Article 4
- Margaret H. Brown Fonds - Archeion. AtoM, s.
- Sonya, Grypma, Healing Henan: Canadian Nurses at the North China Mission, UBC Press.
- Brown, Margaret, Margaret H. Brown Papers, The Burke Library Archives, Columbia University Library.
- Looking East at India’s Women and China’s Daughters, Volume 65, Issue 2. 1945. London: Church of England Zenana Missionary Society. Available through: Adam Matthew, Marlborough, Church Missionary Society Periodicals (October 28, 2018 )
- Looking East at India’s Women and China’s Daughters, Volume 69, Issue 2. 1949. London: Church of England Zenana Missionary Society. Available through: Adam Matthew, Marlborough, Church Missionary Society Periodicals (Accessed October 28, 2018 )
- Looking East at India’s Women and China’s Daughters, Volume 74, Issue 5. 1954. London: Church of England Zenana Missionary Society. Available through: Adam Matthew, Marlborough, Church Missionary Society Periodicals (Accessed October 28, 2018)
- Looking East at India’s Women and China’s Daughters, Volume 75, Issue 2. 1955. London: Church of England Zenana Missionary Society. Available through: Adam Matthew, Marlborough, Church Missionary Society Periodicals (Accessed October 28, 2018 )
- Looking East at India’s Women and China’s Daughters, Volume 80, Issue 2. 1955. London: Church of England Zenana Missionary Society. Available through: Adam Matthew, Marlborough, Church Missionary Society Periodicals (Accessed October 28, 2018)
