= Unley High School =

Location
- Netherby, South Australia; Australia; 34°58′13″S 138°37′12″E

Information
- Type: Public
- Motto: The Utmost for the Highest
- Established: 1910
- Principal: Greg Rolton
- Enrolment: 1260 (2021)
- Colour: Navy Blue
- Affiliation: Sports Association for Adelaide Schools
- Website: uhs.sa.edu.au

Unley High School is a public coeducational secondary school, located in the Adelaide suburb of Netherby in South Australia. It is administered by the Department of Education, with an enrolment of 1,562 students and a teaching staff of 114, as of 2023. The school caters to students from Year 7 to Year 12.

== History ==
In response to a decision by the State Government to provide secondary education to children living in the Adelaide suburbs, Unley High School (then Unley District High School) was founded in 1910 as one of four secondary institutions established for this purpose. Initially it was housed and under the control of the Headmaster of the Unley Primary School but was operated by "special staff" who carried "on the secondary work".

The school officially opened on Tuesday, 25 January 1910 with Lionel H. Jeffries as the school's first teacher in charge, who had transferred from Adelaide High School and remained in charge until 30 June 1911. Another teacher from Adelaide High School, James Leonard Rossiter, took over after him.

The school received its first headmaster in 1915, when the school was granted independence from Unley Primary. Ben Gates was appointed its first headmaster, and he remained at the school until 1940. During his headmastership the school became renowned for its discipline and high academic standards. An early link was forged with the Australian rules football club, Sturt. The colours of the school, light and dark blue, were also the colours of the football club.

During its first decade the school moved south to new buildings in Kyre Avenue, Mitcham. There were problems which developed quite rapidly with this site, especially that it lacked adequate sports grounds. After complicated negotiations, a trust associated with the school eventually acquired a block of land and a cottage. This became an open space, now used by Mitcham Girls High School, on Belair Road. The "memorial gates" celebrating the acquisition of this land were opened in 1936.

Following the setbacks of the Great Depression, which included the introduction of fees for students to attend the high school, student numbers gradually rose to their early 1930s high point. (1931: 956 students, 1934: 638, 1939: 869) Unley High had been a coeducational school from the beginning, but in fact, most classes were taught in single sex groups. This pattern would only change in the late 1960s and early 1970s.

World War II saw continuing privations in the school. It had been a constant pattern from the beginning: class sizes that were too large, and inadequate and too few teaching spaces. During the war, as had occurred in World War I, students were engaged in fund raising, and girls especially, in knitting for the troops. In some of the darkest days of World War II the Parents and Citizens Association was founded and had its first meetings. There had been a School Council with community representatives appointed by the South Australian government since 1916, but now there was a chance for parents to have a much more active role in contributing to the school.

The baby boom of the 1950s saw an enrolment crisis for the school in the late 1950s and early 1960s. Over two thousand students by 1960 was too many. The South Australian government had begun began building new schools from the mid 1950s, including nearby Blackwood, Marion and Daws Road high schools. That helped relieve the pressure. Despite this the Kyre Avenue site was quite inadequate. Land at Netherby, part of the old Peter Waite bequest for agricultural education was finally made available for a new Unley High School. Temporary wooden buildings went up, to be occupied by girls from 1957. The move was largely carried out using their labour as desks chair and books were carried to the new campus. Then came the new permanent building in 1961. The school gradually shifted from Kyre Avenue, Mitcham to Netherby.

With another secondary school, Mitcham Girls Technical High, beginning to occupy the Kyre Avenue site, a decision was taken in 1965 to shift all students to the Netherby campus. One of Unley High's most significant teachers, Jim Giles, was temporarily in charge of the school. It was his decision. Though very large class sizes were endured for some time, the baby boom was passing through the school. By 1970 the school reached the size it roughly maintained thereafter, enrolling between 1,100 and 1,300 students.

There is a published history of the school by Craig Campbell, Unley High School: One hundred years of public education, Wakefield Press, Adelaide, 2010. (There is an earlier version published in 1985 which covers the early years of the school history in more detail.)

The school celebrated its centenary in 2010.

== Sports ==
Unley High School is a member of the Sports Association for Adelaide Schools (SAAS). The school operates an extensive sporting program, both for after-school sport and weekend sport. It participates in South Australian Secondary Schools' Sports Associations programs and also in the Independent Schools' Sporting Association for cricket, hockey and football. It is a member of the Heads of Rowing Schools and has a strong Rowing Club. In 2015 the school hosted the annual schools Head of the River regatta at West Lakes.

== Academic ==
The Environment Group helps to increase the sustainability of the school, while decreasing the negative impact it has on the earth because of energy consumption, water usage and waste. Recent achievements include the purchase of a 24,000-litre rainwater tank to replace the water used in the hand basins and showers in the Life Be In It Gym, the purchase of solar panels on the roof of the school, a water grant to replace all the toilets in the school with dual-flush toilets, and an intensive recycling program.

== Notable alumni ==
- Michael Atkinson – Attorney-General of South Australia, Speaker of the South Australian House of Assembly, and Labor Member for Croydon
- Jesse Aungles – paralympic swimmer
- John Bannon AO – Premier of South Australia and Labor Member for Ross Smith
- Joan Beaumont – historian and academic
- Keith Briggs – mathematician
- Dean Brown AO – Premier of South Australia and Liberal Member for Finniss
- Taryn Brumfitt – writer, director, body image campaigner
- Mark Butler – Federal Labor Member for Hindmarsh
- Leon Carmen – author
- Tom Casey – member of the South Australian Legislative Council
- Peter Colman AC FRS FAA FTSE – scientist who determined the structure of the influenza virus, leading to the development of the drug Relenza.
- Peter Combe OAM – ARIA Award-winning children's singer/songwriter and entertainer
- Tom Daly – basketball player with the Adelaide 36ers
- Oscar Forman – basketball player with the Wollongong Hawks
- Julia Gillard AC – first woman Prime Minister of Australia
- Simon Goodwin – Australian rules football player and captain of the Adelaide Crows, coach of the Melbourne Demons
- Steve Gower AO – Australian Army officer and director of the Australian War Memorial
- Malcolm Greenslade – Australian rules football player
- John Halbert MBE – a former Australian rules football player who played with and captained Sturt in the SANFL
- Cliff Hawkins AM – real estate agent
- Elliott Johnston QC (1918–2011) – Justice of the Supreme Court of South Australia and Commissioner for the Royal Commission into Aboriginal Deaths in Custody
- Linda Kirk – Labor Senator for South Australia
- Bruce Lander – South Australian Independent Commissioner Against Corruption
- Paul Lewis – Australian hockey player
- Trevor McDougall AC FRS FAA FAGU FInstP FRSN – physical oceanographer and climate researcher
- John McLeay Sr. KCMG MM – Speaker of the Australian House of Representatives and Liberal Member for Boothby
- Hedley Marston (1900–1965) – CSIRO biochemist
- Lowitja O'Donoghue AC CBE – Aboriginal Australian public administrator, Australian of the Year in 1984
- Mark Oliphant AC KBE FRS FAA (1901–2000) – physicist, humanitarian and Governor of South Australia
- Pat Oliphant – his nephew, cartoonist with The Advertiser, then a notable career in America
- Chris Picton – State Labor Minister for Health and Wellbeing and Member for Kaurna
- Amanda Rishworth – Federal Labor Member for Kingston
- Don Russell – Australian Ambassador to the United States
- Keith Seaman KCVO OBE – Governor of South Australia
- Dave Shannon – DSO & Bar, DFC & Bar, World War II "Dambuster" pilot
- Jeffrey Smart AO (1921–2013) – cityscape painter
- Laura Stein – Chief Justice of South Australia
- Joseph Garnett Wood (1900–1959) – botanist and president of the Royal Society of South Australia
- Kelly Vincent – member of the South Australian Legislative Council representing the Dignity for Disability party

== Notable staff ==
- Leon Gellert – poet
- May Mills – pioneering sports educator and administrator
- Tom Keough - SANFL Footballer and Phos Williams Medalist

== See also ==
- List of schools in South Australia
