= Loreto College, Marryatville =

Loreto College Marryatville

Location
- Marryatville, Adelaide, South Australia; Australia; 34°55′45″S 138°38′32″E

Information
- Type: Independent primary and secondary day and boarding school
- Motto: Latin: Maria Regina Angelorum. Cruci Dum Spiro Fido (Mary, Queen of the Angels. While I live, I trust in the Cross)
- Religious affiliation: Institute of the Blessed Virgin Mary
- Denomination: Roman Catholic
- Established: 1905; 121 years ago
- Principal: Kylie McCullah
- Gender: Girls
- Colours: Saxon blue and gold
- Affiliation: Junior School Heads Association of Australia
- Website: www.loreto.sa.edu.au

Loreto College Marryatville is an independent Roman Catholic primary and secondary day and boarding school for girls in Marryatville, an inner-eastern suburb of Adelaide, located approximately 4 kilometres (2.5 mi) from the Adelaide city centre, in South Australia, Australia.

Established in 1905, the school is one of many around the world directed by the Institute of the Blessed Virgin Mary (IBVM). It caters to approximately 1,000 students from Reception to Year 12, including 70 boarding students.

== History ==
=== Early history and moves ===
The first Loreto Convent in Adelaide was founded on Sydenham Road, Norwood in 1905. The school opened with only five students and operated in a small house. Two years later, the school moved to a larger house on Eastry Street and The Parade, Norwood.

In December 1920, with an increasing number of pupils, the school moved to the current site "The Acacias," a 5.25 acres (2.12 ha) plot in Marryatville. The new schoolhouse opened in February 1921. The junior school was housed in the ballroom, the billiard room became the dining room, and the original dining room was converted to a chapel. Senior classes were held in two rooms on the ground floor, and boarders slept on the first floor. The nuns occupied the former servants' quarters.

=== College growth ===
By 1925, the stables had been converted into junior school classrooms. The ballroom was converted into a chapel in 1946, with the former chapel becoming a dining room for boarding students. A new wing was opened on 27 May 1951, with classrooms downstairs and dormitories for the boarders located upstairs. In 1959, a science lab and additional classrooms were added.

The Junior School was built in 1961, and the Mary Ward wing of the Senior School built in 1969. The increasing number of students necessitated new buildings and facilities; the Gymnasium and Art facilities were constructed in 1998. Up until 1998, in the Eastern District there were two all-boys colleges, St. Ignatius & Rostrevor.

In 2005, four new middle school classrooms were built in the junior school to house Year 7 students and Chinese-language classes. In conjunction with Montessori, the co-educational Loreto Bapthorpe Early Learning Centre was created, which began operations at the beginning of 2006. Out of School Hours care, the new Portrush Road wall, car parking, and landscaping were also developed in 2005.

A Hospitality and Food Technology Centre was opened in 2006 to deliver and expand curriculum offerings. In 2007, a new Boarding Precinct Development and the St Gertrude's Music Centre were opened. In 2010, the St Anne's Performing Arts Centre was opened.

=== 2026 refurbishment ===
The Acacias has recently used as the school's boardroom. In January 2026 the school announced plans to restore the building, led by South Australian heritage artist Marisha Matthews, who teaches art at the school. Architects Woods Bagot are responsible for developing the plans.

== Notable alumnae ==
- Jessica Adamson ('89) – journalist & TV presenter
- Isobel Borlase – Australian basketball player
- Libby Kosmala – Paralympian nine-time gold medalist for shooting
- Ann Marie Vozzo – Australian soccer player, won Julie Dolan Medal

== Notable staff ==
- Chloë Fox – English, French and History

== See also ==
- List of schools in South Australia
- List of boarding schools in Australia
- Catholic education in Australia
