= Wilderness School =

Coordinates: 34°53′53″S 138°36′31″E

The Wilderness School
- Medindie, South Australia; Australia

Information
- Type: Independent, day and boarding
- Motto: Latin: Semper Verus (Always True)
- Denomination: Non-denominational
- Established: August 8, 1884
- Founder: Margaret Hamilton Brown OBE
- Principal: Belinda Arnfield
- Grades: R–12
- Gender: Girls
- Enrolment: 820 (2018)
- Colours: Brown and blue
- Affiliation: Independent Girls Schools Sports Association
- Website: www.wilderness.com.au

Wilderness School is an independent, non-denominational Christian, day and boarding school for girls, located in Medindie, an inner northern suburb of Adelaide, South Australia.

Established by the Brown family in 1884 with four girls and one small boy, Andrew Muecke, as students, Wilderness is a Reception to Year 12 school, and also caters for Year 13. The school enrolled approximately 820 students in 2007, including up to 80 boarders. In 2003, The Australian declared The Wilderness School one of the ten highest-achieving schools in Australia.

Wilderness School is affiliated with the Association of Heads of Independent Schools of Australia (AHISA), the Junior School Heads Association of Australia (JSHAA), the Australian Boarding Schools' Association, the Alliance of Girls' Schools Australasia (AGSA) and the Independent Girls' Schools Sports Association (IGSSA).

== History ==
The school was created by the Brown family who encouraged their eldest daughter, Margaret Hamilton Brown, to take an interest in education after her father's business had failed. Margaret was born in Edinburgh and educated in South Australia, and she showed a talent for teaching. In 1884, she started a small school in her parents home with her youngest sister, Mary (Mamie) Home Brown, as one of the five founding pupils.

In the following year the family moved and Margaret began a kindergarten based on play equipment from Germany and the ideas of Friedrich Froebel. As the children grew, so did the focus of the school and, in 1893, Margaret bought a building on Northcote Terrace to host a school that she later renamed "The Wilderness".

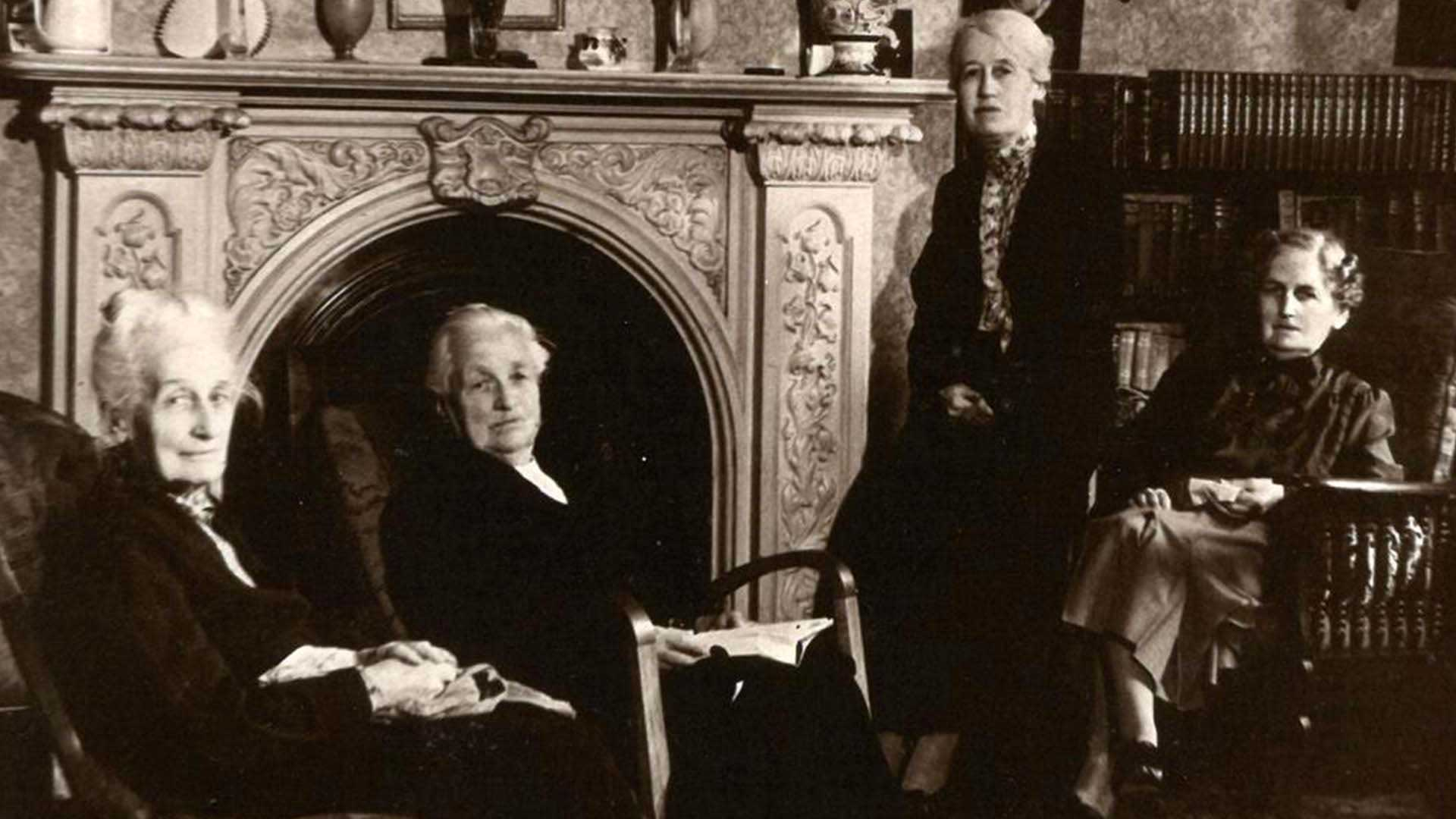
The four surviving Brown sisters in 1946

It became a boarding school that increasingly employed the five Brown sisters as teachers. The Brown family helped to run the school which had no uniform. Classes took place around the dining table, in an old tram, or in the stables. Margaret's younger sister Mamie Brown showed a talent for teaching. She introduced the ideas of Charlotte Mason while Margaret moved aside to manage the school's business rather than the education. By the end of World War II, the school had 360 pupils. Margaret was awarded an OBE in 1948 and, in the same year, the school was formed as a company. Margaret died in 1952 and Mamie in 1968, leaving a thriving school.

In 2003, The Australian declared the school to be one of the ten highest-achieving schools in Australia.

== House system ==
The Wilderness School has five houses, through which all girls partake in intra-school activities:

- Amaryllis (Pink)
- Antholiza (Blue)
- Carob (Green)
- Cedar (Purple)
- Sparaxis (Orange)

== Sport ==
Wilderness School is a member of the Independent Girls Schools Sports Association (IGSSA). The school maintains the sporting grounds at Park 6 on Robe Terrace, for use as hockey, lacrosse and soccer fields. Other sporting facilities include a gymnasium which was completed in 2005, and a boatshed at the South Australian Rowing Association complex at West Lakes for rowing.

=== IGSSA premierships ===
Wilderness school has won the following IGSSA premierships.

- Badminton (3) – 2009, 2014, 2015
- Hockey (7) – 1981, 1982, 1998, 2002, 2005, 2006, 2019
- Swimming – 2010
- Australian Rules Football - 2025

== Notable alumnae ==
- Mamie Brown – founding pupil and the second principal
- Annabel Crabb – the ABC's chief online political writer, formerly political columnist with The Age
- Ally Fowler – actress
- Posie Graeme-Evans – novelist, producer, director of drama, co-creator of Hi-5 and McLeod's Daughters (also attended The Fahan School)
- Mekhla Kumar – pianist
- Susan Magarey – historian and author
- Georgie Parker – member of the Australian National Hockey Team.
- Phiala E. Shanahan – theoretical physicist
- Ellinor Gertrude Walker – teacher and women's rights activist

== See also ==
- List of schools in South Australia
- List of boarding schools
