= Margaret Hamilton Brown =

Scottish-born school founder and headmistress

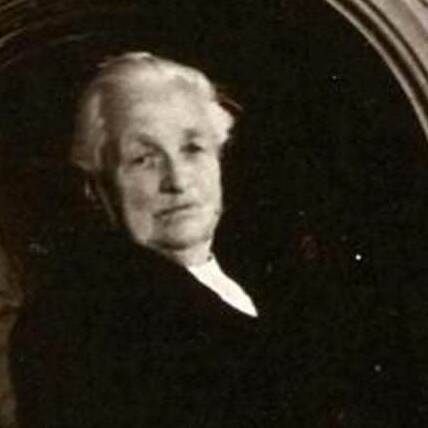
- Margaret Hamilton Brown circa 1946
- Born: 20 May 1858; Edinburgh
- Died: 5 December 1952 (aged 94)
- Occupation: headmistress
- Successor: Mamie Brown

Margaret Hamilton Brown OBE aka Maggie-Meg Brown (20 May 1858 – 5 December 1952) was a Scottish born school founder and headmistress in Adelaide in Australia. After her father's business collapsed Margaret led the family's initiative to found a school. What started out as a mixed kindergarten developed into the Wilderness School – a leading school for girls. All of her family were involved in some way and her successor was one of her first pupils, her sister Mamie Brown.

== Life ==
Brown was born in Edinburgh in 1858. She was the first born daughter of a teacher Mary Brown (born Home) and James Brown who had a shop and sold music. Her father went to Australia and in 1863, she, her mother and her sister, Kate, emigrated to join him. She was educated in South Australia where she taught at the North Adelaide Model School from 1878 to 1883. In the following year her family encouraged her to start a small school in their home. Her father's hardware business had failed. Her youngest sister, Mary (Mamie) Home Brown, was one of the four founding female pupils and there was also a single boy. In the following year the family moved and Margaret began a kindergarten in the new home based on specialised equipment from Germany. The approach to learning was based on the ideas of Friedrich Froebel and it may have been the first South Australian kindergarten. As her pupils and her sisters grew then so did the focus of the school. In 1893 Margaret bought a building on Northcote Terrace to host a school that she later renamed "The Wilderness".

The school became a boarding school that increasingly employed Margaret's sisters as teachers. Margaret's brothers constructed the schools tennis courts. The Brown family helped to run the school which by choice had no uniform. Classes took place in a variety of locations around the dining table, in the stables or in an old tram in the garden. Margaret's younger sister Mamie Brown who had been a foundation pupil showed a talent for teaching. She left the school for a few years before she returned with her degree from the University of Adelaide where she taught Latin and maths.

Margaret was keen that her students should be ambitious and that the school needed to prepare them for more than marriage and motherhood. She was concerned when she found out in 1910 that so many of the girls had opted to only continue with easier subjects. She defined education to be not too "easy and pleasant" and that effort was required if only to improve "moral fibre". Many of the parents' expectations were low. They expected that their daughters would leave school and return home to join their mothers.

Mamie introduced the ideas of Charlotte Mason who believed that teachers should allow students to develop. The school joined the Parents' National Educational Union of Great Britain in 1928. Margaret increasingly moved aside to manage the school's business leaving the leadership of the education to Mamie. Her younger sister Kate suffered from depression and lived apart from the family. In 1931 she took her own life.

By the end of the second world war the successful school had 360 pupils and Margaret was working after over 60 years with all three of her surviving sisters Annie, Mamie and Wynnie. Margaret was awarded an OBE in the New Year Honours of 1948 and in the same year the school was made into a company so that it was independent of its founders.

== Death and legacy ==
Margaret died in 1952 and Mamie in 1968 leaving a thriving school. In 2003, The Australian declared the school she had founded as one of the ten highest achieving schools in Australia.
