= Norwood International High School =

Location
- Adelaide, South Australia; Australia; 34°55′4″S 138°40′18″E

Information
- Type: Co-educational public high school
- Motto: By Daring and By Doing
- Established: 1910
- Principal: Roy Page
- Grades: 7–12
- Campus: The Parade, Magill, Adelaide
- Colour
- Mascot: Eagle
- Accreditation: CIS, IBMYP, IBDP
- Affiliation: Sports Association for Adelaide Schools
- Website: www.nihs.sa.edu.au

Norwood International High School (NIHS) is a single-campus, co-educational, public high school located in the eastern suburbs of Adelaide, South Australia.

Founded as Norwood District High School in 1910 on Osmond Terrace, Norwood, the school relocated five years later to Kensington Park for nearly half a century, and changed its name to Norwood High School (NHS) in 1947. This school moved to its present location in Magill between 1960 and 1962.

Morialta High School came into being in 1975, and was merged with Norwood High in 1993, to become Norwood Morialta High School (NMHS), across two campuses. The Morialta site in Rostrevor became Middle Campus, for Years 8 to 10, while the Magill site was known as senior campus (Years 11 to 12).

In 2022 the two campuses were amalgamated to form Norwood International High School at the Magill site. The former Morialta campus was closed down, and the new Morialta Secondary College opened on the same site in 2023.

== History ==
Norwood International High School's history spans over 100 years across numerous campus locations and name changes.

Various logos of Norwood International High School

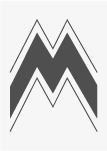
Morialta High School Logo (1974–1993)

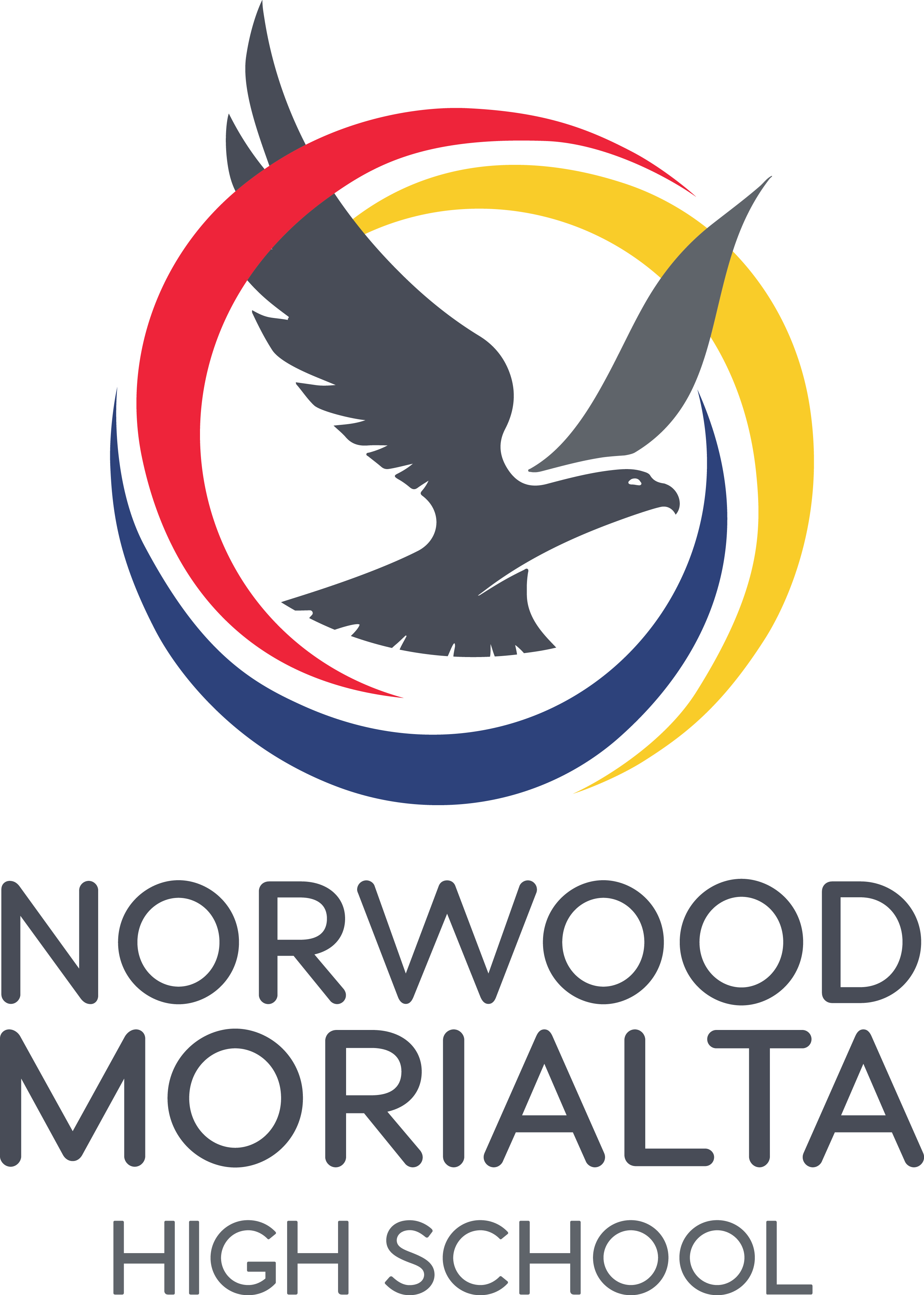
Norwood Morialta High School Logo (2017–2021)

=== Norwood High School (1910–1993) ===
Norwood High School (NHS) first opened on 25 January 1910 on Osmond Terrace, Norwood, as Norwood District High School. In 1915, it moved to new premises at Lossie Street Kensington Park. In 1962, the school moved to what is now the NMHS Senior Campus on The Parade, Magill.

Norwood High School shared common origins with Norwood Boys Technical School, a school that later became Norwood Boys High, then Marryatville Boys High, and subsequently amalgamated with Kensington and Norwood Girls Technical High to become Marryatville High School, a school that shared a strong rivalry with NHS and continues to with the current NMHS. The school provided an alternative to parents living in the eastern suburbs that wanted to enrol their children in a public school rather than one of the many private, selective and technical schools that were also in the area. During that time Ivan Coward was principal, and he met the needs of those enrolled in the public system who sought entry to the academic world.

The school published the Norwood High School Magazine, later known as Norwood High School Yearbook and also titled NHS, between at least 1956 and 1990.

=== Morialta High School (1974–1993) ===
Morialta High School's founding principal was Ian "Joe" Laslett. He was appointed to the position in 1974, in the year before its opening, so was able to liaise closely with the architects during the construction of the school, appoint his staff in preparation for its opening in 1975 and provide opportunities for all who were to be part of the school community to have a say in formulating its philosophies and practices.

Although not due to take up their appointments until 1975, the senior staff met regularly towards the latter part of 1974 and a whole staff conference was held at Graham's Castle conference centre in December of that year.

The school was not ready to open in February 1975 so, for the first weeks the initial 540 students (Years 8 and 9 only) and 45 teachers were housed at Murray House, a grand old building, part of the Murray Park College of Advanced Education (now the Magill Campus of the University of South Australia) until the completion of the main building ("B Block") at Rostrevor. The staff then voted to move into B Block although construction of the other buildings and facilities still continued. The toilet block was not finished, so buses were provided with a timetable to transport students to the nearby McNally Training Centre until the school's facilities were ready.

The buses were also used to provide outdoor education opportunities in the early weeks. These endeavours helped develop a cohesive spirit amongst all members of the school community.

Morialta had an open plan design. "B Block" housed an extensive science teaching area on the ground level and open plan classrooms on levels 2 and 3. Whilst the majority of the eight teaching areas on levels 2 and 3 were designed as Mathematics and Humanities areas, each level had one area also dedicated to Science teaching. The school won awards for its design in the 1970s, as it was considered modern and futuristic for its time.

Morialta was not a specialist High School but had many experienced specialist teachers and ancillary staff. One staff member was senior lab technician Charles Jennings, who worked for 32 years at the school and, later, Norwood Morialta High School, setting up accurate data records and hazardous substances folders for the science area, which helped the school gain level 3 occupational health safety and welfare (OHS&W) accreditation.

Another founding staff member was Deputy Principal, Peter Lang, who later returned as Principal of the amalgamated Norwood and Morialta High Schools.

The early years of the school were packed full of innovative practices and esprit de corps was high. School socials were a regular event and, on 8 December 1975 Australian band Cold Chisel performed at the school.

Following the amalgamation, the Morialta site became the NMHS Middle Campus.

=== Norwood Morialta High School (1993–2021) ===
Norwood Morialta High School was formed in 1993 following the amalgamation of Norwood High School and Morialta High School. From 1993 onwards, all students in Years 8 to 10 were based at the Middle Campus, and students in Years 11 to 12 were based at the Senior Campus. The Middle Campus concentrates on developing students from Years 8 to 10 for life at the Senior Campus, which in turn focuses on the senior years of schooling and entrance into higher education. NMHS is the only Government High School in South Australia with two completely separate campuses. Over the past few years, students have sought to enrol at Norwood Morialta High School from outside of the school's zone. Students from Hong Kong, Vietnam, China, Germany, and South America have also been recruited through the school's International Program. Many international students take the opportunity to study their own language at Year 12 level through the School of Languages in addition to the Intensive Secondary English Course (ISEC) established in 2000. Students can begin at the Middle Campus in Years 8 to 10, or at the Senior Campus in Years 11 or 12.

As at Term 3, 2019, Norwood Morialta High School had 1,493.2 full-time equivalent (FTE) students enrolled. Year 12 students of Norwood Morialta High School achieved outstanding results in 2019 as part of their study of the South Australian Certificate of Education, with 100% of students successfully completing their SACE. Of these, one in three (33%) of students achieve results in the A Band and a further 47% achieving in the B band.

In 2021, new buildings were constructed to accommodate the new addition of Year 7 students.

=== Norwood International High School (2022–present) ===
In late 2021, and with the schools forthcoming colocation to the Magill site, the schools Governing Council, in consultation with the wider school community, made the decision to rename the school to Norwood International High School to reflect the school's long standing commitment to internationalism and respect the heritage of the Magill site. A new school, the Morialta Secondary College, is being built in Rostrevor on the middle campus site.

== Exchange program ==
The school has established links with sister schools located internationally in China (Yantai High School, Yantai), Germany (Berufliche Schule des Kreis Segeberg in Norderstedt, Norderstedt), Greece (1st Lykeio Patras, Patras), Japan (Okayama Prefectural Takahashi High School, Okayama), and Italy (Scuola Media Statale Antonio Genovesi, Salerno).

Annual exchanges occur with each of the sister schools, with NMHS sending students to a sister school one year, and hosting students from that school the following year. This gives students the opportunity to experience both the culture and education systems of another country and enhance student learning and communications skills in other languages. There are also opportunities for individual students to go on a long term exchange overseas. The tenth anniversary of the exchange with Japan was celebrated in September 2000.

== International Baccalaureate ==
Since 1996, NMHS Middle Campus has offered a comprehensive program that meets requirements of both the South Australian Curriculum and Accountability (SACSA) framework and the International Baccalaureate Middle Years Program. It offers Years 3, 4 and 5 of the IBMYP and operates in a cluster of schools in which Years 1 and 2 are offered by three local Primary Schools.

In order to meet MYP requirements, students must choose Language B, Technology and Arts courses in Year 10. All students study courses in English, Health and PE, Mathematics, Science and Society and Environment in each year. In Years 9 and 10, Maths courses are differentiated into Advanced and Standard. Language B (a study of a second language) is compulsory in Years 8, 9, and 10.

In 2022, Norwood International High School introduced the International Baccalaureate Diploma Program for the first time, providing another senior school education program, alongside the South Australian Certificate of Education (SACE).

== Student Life ==
=== School Houses ===
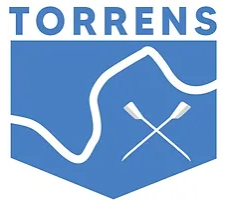
Torrens House

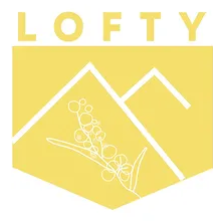
Lofty House

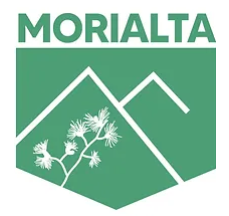
Morialta House

In 2022, the school moved to four houses (from the previous 3 houses) as part of a review of the house and student leadership structures. As part of this redevelopment, students at Norwood International High School have more opportunities to be involved in school leadership. This will see a total of 8 Year 12 Prefects per house consisting of:

- 2 x Head Prefects
- 1 x International Prefect
- 1 x Student Life Prefect
- 1 x Wellbeing Prefect
- 1 x Environmental Prefect
- 2 x House Prefects

=== Co-curricular activities ===
Students have opportunities to partake in academic pursuits as well by participating in a vast range of co-curricular activities.

Community Service can be done through programmes such as the 40 Hour Famine, active8, Glossy Black Cockatoo Project, Peer Support, and the publication of School Yearbook. Students can also participate in broader activities such as Amnesty International, Australian Business Week, Campbelltown Youth Council, UNICEF Ambassadors, Youth Parliament Group, Debating, National Mathematics, Science and Language competitions, School Formal Committee, and the Student Representative Council.

=== New Facilities 2022 ===
Norwood International High School received $51.95m as part of the Building Better Schools fund, to co-locate the two campuses onto The Parade site, accommodating 1700 students across Years 7 to 12. From 2022, Norwood International High School students includes:

- A new three-storey middle school building with maker spaces, a canteen and roof-top place space
- An extended Innovation Hub with refurbished Technology and Music suites and a new two-story building for Home Economics and Art, Design and Media
- A refurbished gymnasium and expanded sports courts
- A re-developed contemporary Learning Hub and Student Support Centre (former cafeteria space).
- A renovated Administration area, staffroom and Wellbeing Hub
- Ten refurbished classrooms, two modern laboratories, collaborative learning spaces and staff preparation area
- New lift and facade
- Landscaping, outdoor learning spaces and car park

Project construction commenced in Term 3, 2020 and has been delivered incrementally to minimise disruption.

== Notable alumni ==
This list is incomplete, and includes former students, not all of whom graduated from schools included in the history of this school.

=== Business ===
- Roberto Cardone, founder of Cibo Espresso
- Jim Zavos, Founder of EzyDVD

=== Media, entertainment, and the arts ===
- Dame Judith Anderson AC DBE, actress
- Kate Collins, journalist, presenter of Nine News Adelaide
- Richard Fidler, entertainer, former member of the Australian comedy group the Doug Anthony All Stars
- Clive Hale, news and current affairs presenter
- Jim Keays, lead singer The Masters Apprentices
- Dichen Lachman, actress in Neighbours
- Anthony La Paglia, actor
- Lily Nova, supermodel
- Melanie Vallejo, actress in Winners & Losers

=== Politics and law ===
- Houssam Abiad, former Deputy Lord Mayor of the City of Adelaide
- Professor Barbara Pocock AM, Australian Greens Senator
- Katie Hodson-Thomas, Former Member for Carine, Western Australian Parliament
- Justice John Sulan, South Australian Judge
- Stephen Yarwood, Former Lord Mayor of the City of Adelaide

=== Science and Medicine ===
- Dr Helen Marshall AM, Australian medical researcher and 2022 South Australian of the Year

=== Sport ===
- Nathan Bassett, Adelaide Crows AFL Football player
- Neil Craig, former SANFL player and former coach of Adelaide Crows AFL Football team
- Orazio Fantasia, Australian Football League player
- Andrew Schacht, Olympic athlete, Volleyball
- Grant Tanner, Geelong Football Club AFL Football
- Stefan Welch, Australian Baseball League player

=== Other ===
- Lionel Matthews, army officer, posthumous recipient of the George Cross
