= List of towns in the Adelaide Hills =

The following towns, places, villages, and localities exist in the Adelaide Hills Region and foothills. (Major towns are shown in bold, localities/areas are in italic, and places that are sometimes viewed as being within the Adelaide Hills region have an *):

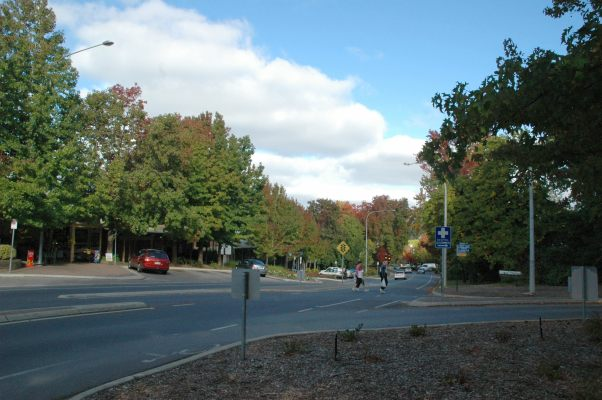
Stirling main street

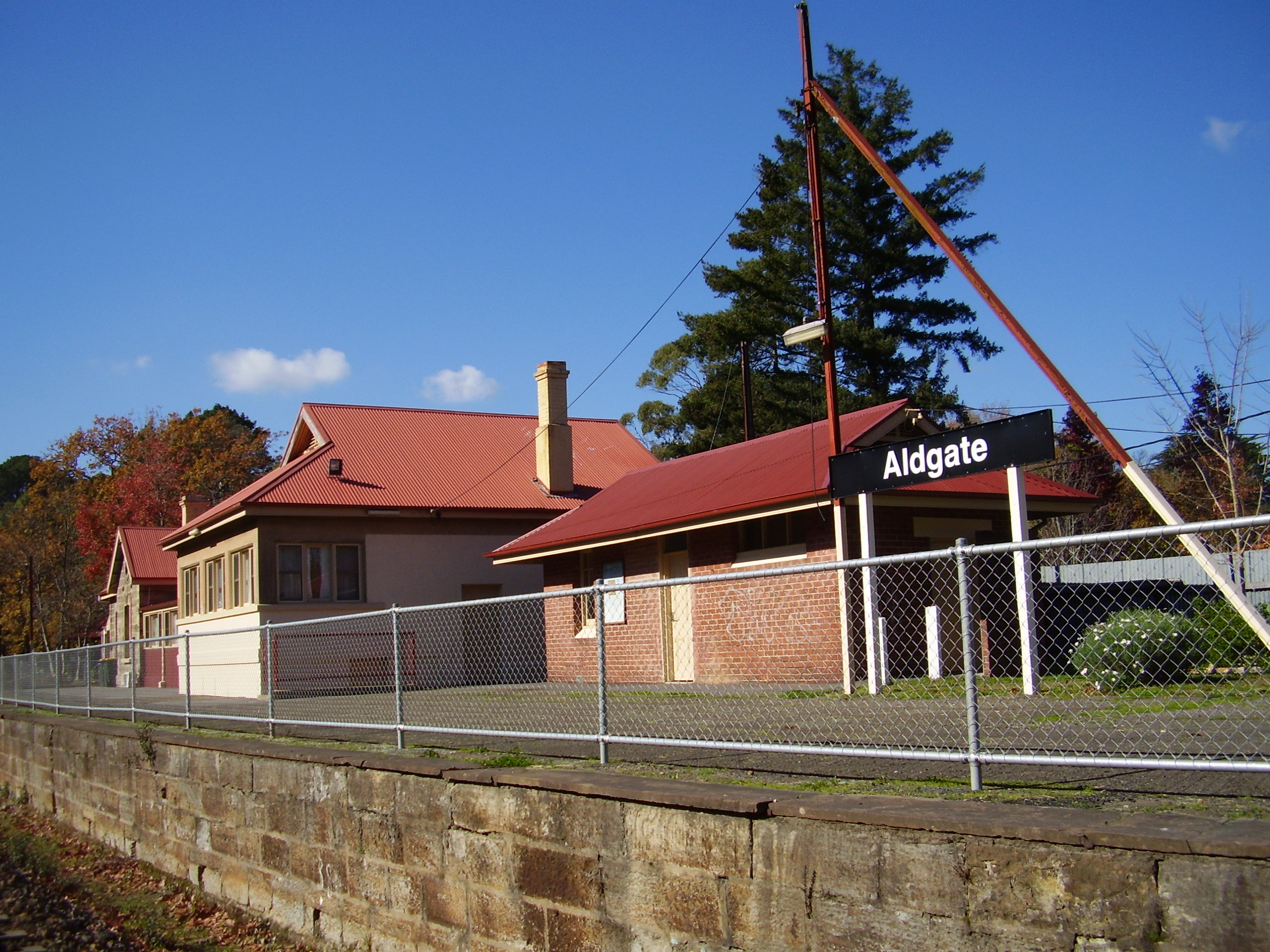
Aldgate train station

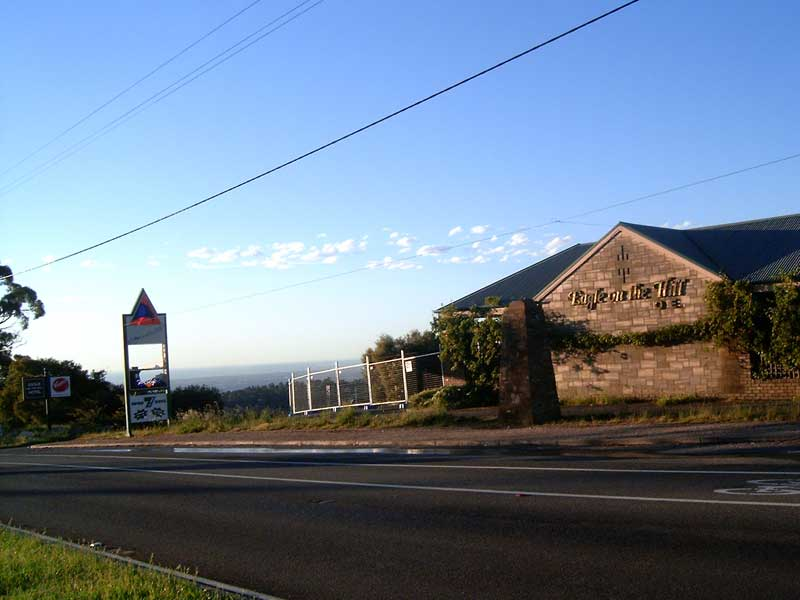
The now-closed Eagle on the Hill Hotel

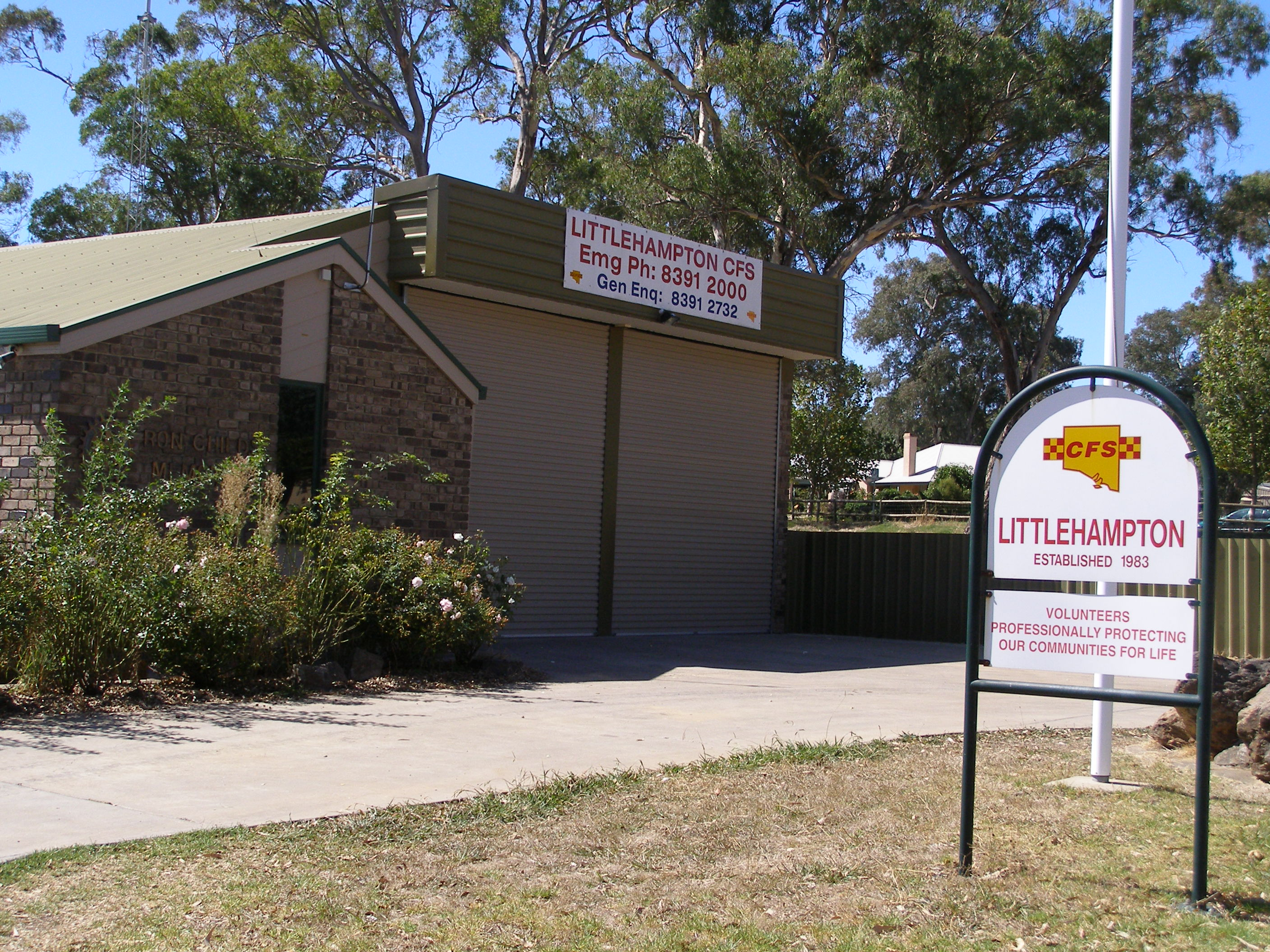
The Littlehampton CFS Station

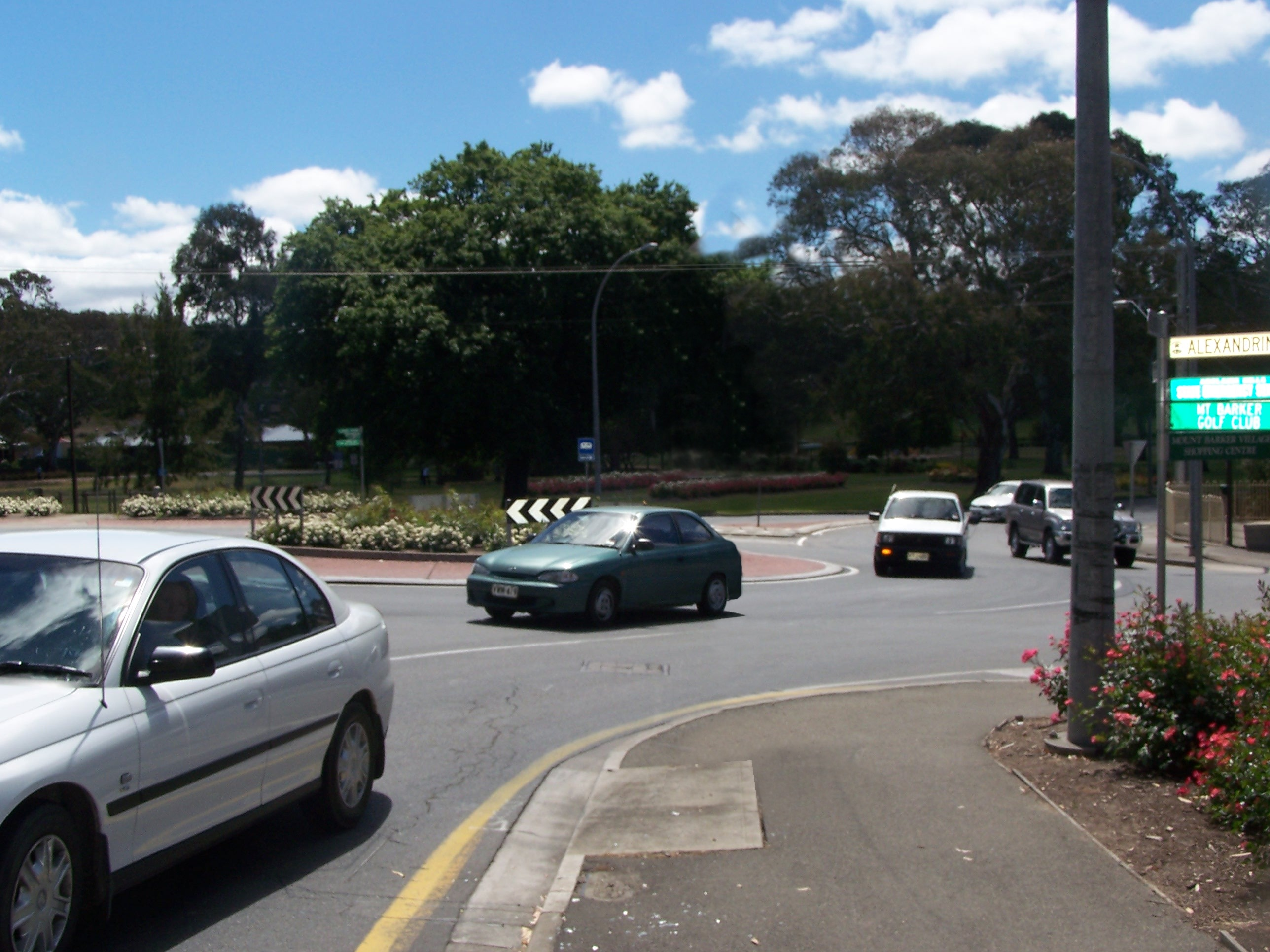
The roundabout outside the Mount Barker High School

**A-J**
- **Aldgate**
- Ashton
- **Balhannah**
- Basket Range
- Belair
- Biggs Flat
- **Birdwood**
- **Blackwood***
- Blyth Town
- Bradbury
- Bremer Valley
- **Bridgewater**
- Brown Hill Creek*
- Brukunga
- Bugle Ranges
- Callington*
- Carey Gully
- Castambul
- Chain Of Ponds
- Charleston
- Cherryville
- **Crafers**
- **Crafers West**
- Cromer
- Cudlee Creek
- Dawesley
- Dorset Vale
- Eagle on the Hill
- **Echunga**
- Flaxley
- Forest Range
- Forreston
- Friedensberg*
- Gemmells
- Glenalta*
- Greenhill
- **Gumeracha**
- **Hahndorf**
- Harlestone
- Harrogate
- Hartley Vale
- Hawthorndene
- Hay Valley
- Heathfield
- Hendryton
- Hermitage Estate
- Lower Hermitage
- Upper Hermitage
- Highercombe
- Horsnell Gully*
- Houghton
- Humbug Scrub*
- Inglewood
- Inverbrackie
- Ironbank
**K-Z**
- Kanmantoo*
- Kenton Valley
- **Kersbrook**
- Kirchenbergen
- Klenke
- Konterral*
- Lenswood
- **Lobethal**
- Longwood
- **Macclesfield**
- Manxtown
- Marble Hill
- **Meadows**
- Millbrook
- Montacute
- Mount Crawford
- Mount George
- Mount Osmond*
- Mount Torrens
- Mylor
- **Nairne**
- Native Valley
- Neudorf
- Norton Summit
- **Oakbank**
- **One Tree Hill***
- Paechtown
- Paracombe
- Pella
- Petwood
- Piccadilly
- Prairie
- Prospect Hill
- Rebensberg
- Red Creek
- Salem
- Sampson Flat
- Schoenthal
- Scott Creek
- Skye*
- Springhead
- **Springton***
- St. Ives
- **Stirling**
- Summertown
- The Gorge
- Treegoodwill
- Upper Sturt
- **Uraidla**
- Verdun
- Warren
- Waterfall Gully
- **Williamstown***
- Wistow
- **North Woodside**
- **Woodside**
**Greater Mount Barker Urban Area**
- Blakiston
- Blakiston Park
- **Littlehampton**
- **Mount Barker**
- Mount Barker Junction
- Mount Barker Springs
- Mount Barker Summit
- Totness
- Wistow (Parts of)
- Zion Hill

== Places of Significance ==
- Kuitpo Forest
- Heysen Trail
- South Eastern Freeway
- Mount Crawford Forrest
