= Kyeema =

Kyeema may refer to:

- Kyeema, an aircraft which crashed in the Australian state of Victoria in 1938 (refer 1938 Kyeema Crash).
- Kyeema (rice), an Australian rice variety (refer List of rice varieties).
- Kyeema, South Australia, a locality.
  - Kyeema Conservation Park, a protected area in South Australia.
  - Kyeema Prison Camp, a former penal facility in South Australia.
- Kyeema Foundation, an Australian international development NGO (refer Australian Council for International Development).
