= Dingabledinga, South Australia =

Dingabledinga
- Town
- Coordinates: 35.26°S 138.63°E
- Country: Australia
- State: South Australia
- LGA: Alexandrina Council
- Location: 12 km (7.5 mi) southeast of McLaren Vale; 46 km (29 mi) south of Adelaide city centre

Government
  - State electorate: Heysen
  - Federal division: Mayo
- Elevation: 290 m (950 ft)
- Postcode: 5172
Localities around Dingabledinga
The Range		Kuitpo
Montarra	Dingabledinga	Kyeema
Hope Forest

Dingabledinga is a locality in the southern Mount Lofty Ranges of South Australia. It is on the ridge southeast of McLaren Vale and south of Adelaide. The name is supposed to be derived from an Aboriginal name meaning "water everywhere".

Dingabledinga settlement was established in the 1930s by the Unemployment Relief Council. Seventeen families were settled on land at Dingabledinga and Hope Forest in 1931 by the South Australian government prior to receiving that grant from the Australian government. The locality existed before that as it was designated as a polling place in 1912. It had been identified as suitable land for fruit orchards by 1904.

The Hope Forest-Dingabledinga Memorial Hall was erected in memory of those who served in Australia's armed forces.

== Notable people ==
- Richard Jolly, Horse Trainer
- Angus Dawson, Australian Rower, Olympian
