= District Council of Mount Barker =

Mount Barker District Council
- Local government area
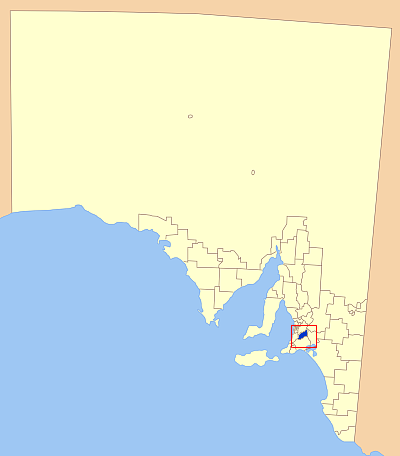

- Interactive map of Mount Barker District Council
- Coordinates: 35°03′50″S 138°51′29″E
- Country: Australia
- State: South Australia
- Region: Adelaide Hills
- Established: 1853
- Council seat: Mount Barker

Government
  - Mayor: David Leach
  - State electorate: Kavel, Heysen
  - Federal division: Mayo

Area
  - Total: 595 km^{2} (230 sq mi)

Population
  - Total: 39,217 (LGA 2021)
  - Density: 65.9/km^{2} (171/sq mi)
- Website: Mount Barker District Council
LGAs around Mount Barker District Council
Adelaide Hills	Adelaide Hills	Mid Murray
Onkaparinga	Mount Barker District Council	Murray Bridge
Alexandrina	Alexandrina	Alexandrina

The Mount Barker District Council is a local government area, centred on the Adelaide hills town of Mount Barker, just outside the Adelaide metropolitan area in South Australia.

== History ==
The council was established in October 1853. In May 1935, it expanded to four times its original size as part of a major series of council amalgamations, absorbing the District Council of Nairne and parts of the District Council of Echunga and the District Council of Macclesfield.

== Council ==
Members of the council are:

Ward	Party	Councillor	Notes
Mayor	Independent	David Leach	
South	Labor	Rowan Voogt	
South	Independent	Narelle Hardingham	
South	One Nation	Rebecca Hewett	
Central	Independent	Sally Harding	
Central	Liberal	Bradley Orr	
Central	Greens	Ian Grosser	
Central	Independent	Samantha Jones	
North	Independent	Jessica Szilassy	
North	Independent	Simon Westwood	
North	Independent	Harry Seager	

== Towns and localities ==
Towns and localities in the Mount Barker District Council include:

- Biggs Flat
- Blakiston
- Bradbury (part)
- Bridgewater (part)
- Brukunga
- Bugle Ranges
- Bull Creek (part)
- Callington (part)
- Chapel Hill
- Dawesley
- Dorset Vale (part)
- Echunga
- Flaxley
- Green Hills Range
- Hahndorf
- Harrogate
- Hay Valley (part)
- Jupiter Creek
- Kangarilla (part)
- Kanmantoo
- Kuitpo (part)
- Littlehampton
- Macclesfield (part)
- Meadows
- Mount Barker
- Mount Barker Junction (part)
- Mount Barker Springs
- Mount Barker Summit
- Mount Torrens (part)
- Mylor (part)
- Nairne
- Paechtown
- Paris Creek (part)
- Petwood
- Prospect Hill (part)
- St Ives
- Totness
- Verdun (part)
- Wistow
- Woodside (part)

== See also ==
- List of parks and gardens in rural South Australia
