= Electoral district of Heysen =

South Australian state electoral district

Heysen South Australia—House of Assembly
- Interactive map of electoral district boundaries
- State: South Australia
- Dates current: 1970–1977, 1985–present
- MP: Josh Teague
- Party: Liberal
- Namesake: Sir Hans Heysen
- Electors: 30,054 (2026)
- Area: 927.6 km^{2} (358.1 sq mi)
- Demographic: Outer metro/inner rural
- Coordinates: 35°11′12″S 138°48′38″E
Electorates around Heysen:
Bragg	Morialta; Kavel	Hammond
Waite Davenport Hurtle Vale Kaurna	Heysen	Hammond
Mawson	Finniss	Hammond

Footnotes
- Electoral District map

Heysen is a single-member electoral district for the South Australian House of Assembly. It is named after Sir Hans Heysen, a prominent South Australian landscape artist. It is a hybrid urban-rural seat to the south-east of Adelaide which includes both residential Adelaide Hills suburbs in its west and orchard and farming areas in its centre, eastern and southernmost areas. It includes the localities of Aldgate, Ashbourne, Belvidere, Biggs Flat, Blackfellows Creek, Blewitt Springs, Bradbury, Bridgewater, Bugle Ranges, Bull Creek, Chapel Hill, Clarendon, Crafers, Dingabledinga, Dorset Vale, Echunga, Flaxley, Gemmells, Green Hills Range, Heathfield, Highland Valley, Hope Forest, Ironbank, Jupiter Creek, Kangarilla, Kuitpo, Kuitpo Colony, Kyeema, Longwood, Macclesfield, McHarg Creek, Meadows, Montarra, Mount Magnificent, Mylor, Paris Creek, Prospect Hill, Red Creek, Salem, Sandergrove, Scott Creek, Stirling, The Range, Willunga Hill, Willyaroo, Wistow, Woodchester, Yundi; as well as parts of Bletchley, Hartley, Onkaparinga Hills, Upper Sturt. Although geographically it is a hybrid urban-rural seat and not considered to be in metropolitan Adelaide, for electoral classification purposes the Electoral Commission of South Australia labels it as "outer metropolitan".

== History ==
As Heysen combines both wealthier suburbs in the foothills of the Adelaide Hills and rural areas further east, it has been held by the Liberal Party and its predecessor, the Liberal and Country League, ever since its creation in the electoral redistribution of 1969 as a replacement for Stirling. For most of that time, it has been a fairly safe to safe seat for the conservatives. It was first contested at the 1970 election. It was abolished at the 1977 election, forcing then-member David Wotton to move to the seat of Murray. However, Wotton returned to Heysen when it was re-established at the 1985 election. He subsequently held the seat until his retirement in 2002, when he was replaced by former opposition leader Isobel Redmond. Redmond retired at the 2018 election and was replaced by Josh Teague.

The 1997 election saw the Democrats receive 47.9 percent of the two-candidate preferred vote, the closest they had ever come to a seat any Australian lower house (apart from the South Australian seat of Mitcham). The 2002 election saw the Democrats receive 46 percent of the two-candidate preferred vote. The 2006 election saw their vote collapse with Labor being brought back into the two-candidate race. That election saw the seat turn marginal against Labor for the first time ever; the Liberals were cut down to 53 percent of the two-party vote. Out of 47 lower house seats, the Greens have consistently polled strongest in Heysen. Greens candidate Lynton Vonow came within a few percent of winning the overlapping federal seat of Mayo at the 2008 by-election. Vonow contested Heysen for the Greens at the 2014 election and overtook the Labor candidate coming second after preferences with a 39 percent two-candidate preferred vote from a 19.7 percent primary vote. The Greens also polled well in neighbouring seats such as Kavel and Davenport with primary votes over 15 percent. The 2018 election saw Nick Xenophon's SA-BEST receive 48.2 percent of the two-candidate preferred vote in Heysen which was the closest they came to winning a lower house seat.

At the 2022 state election, the Liberals fell to only 51 percent of the two-party vote amid their statewide collapse, only the second time the seat had been marginal against Labor. Four years later, Teague, by then deputy opposition leader, only held onto his seat by less than 350 votes amid a second consecutive Liberal electoral meltdown.

== Members for Heysen ==
First incarnation (1970–1977)
Member	Party	Term
William McAnaney	Liberal and Country	1970–1974
William McAnaney	Liberal	1974–1975
David Wotton	Liberal	1975–1977
Second incarnation (1985–present)
Member	Party	Term
David Wotton	Liberal	1985–2002
Isobel Redmond	Liberal	2002–2018
Josh Teague	Liberal	2018–present

== Election results ==
2026 South Australian state election: Heysen
Party	Candidate	Votes	%	±%
Liberal	Josh Teague	8,697	32.6	−9.4
Labor	Marisa Bell	6,472	24.2	−1.3
Greens	Genevieve Dawson-Scott	5,838	21.9	+2.3
One Nation	Tom Kovac	4,313	16.2	+11.5
Animal Justice	Gregory Davis	477	1.8	+1.8
Independent	Andrew Granger	454	1.7	+1.7
Family First	Chris Baker	285	1.1	−2.8
Australian Family	Craig Wilson	90	0.3	+0.3
Fair Go	Tonya Scott	78	0.3	+0.3
Total formal votes		26,704	96.1	−1.9
Informal votes		1,095	3.9	+1.9
Turnout		27,799	92.5	−1.0
Two-party-preferred result
Liberal	Josh Teague	13,531	50.6	−1.3
Labor	Marisa Bell	13,184	49.4	+1.3
Liberal hold		Swing	−1.3	
