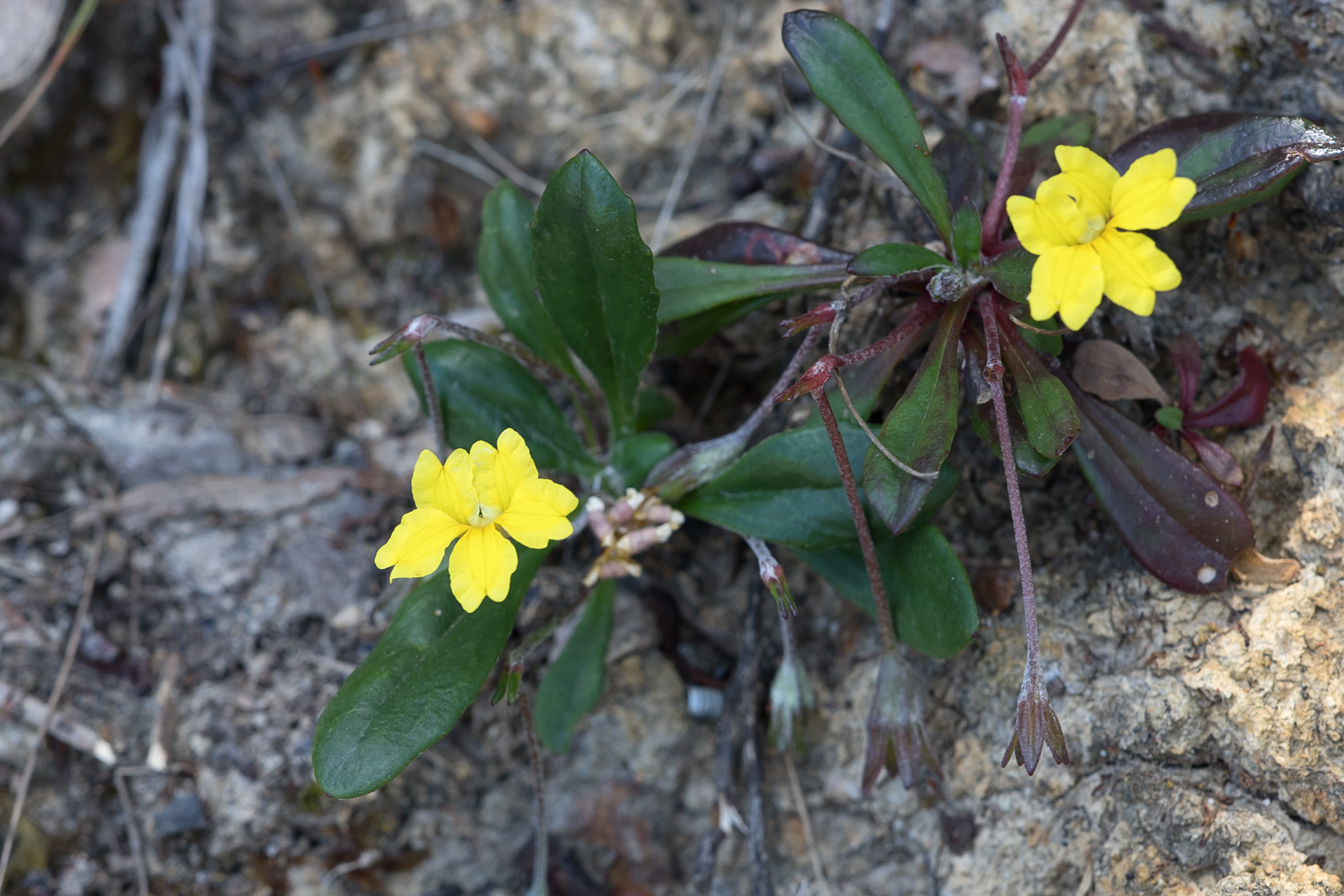
- In Scott Creek Conservation Park

Scientific classification
- Kingdom: Plantae
- Clade: Tracheophytes
- Clade: Angiosperms
- Clade: Eudicots
- Clade: Asterids
- Order: Asterales
- Family: Goodeniaceae
- Genus: Goodenia
- Species: G. blackiana

Binomial name
- Goodenia blackiana Carolin

= Goodenia blackiana =

Black's goodenia

Species of plant

Goodenia blackiana, commonly known as Black's goodenia, is a species of flowering plant in the family Goodeniaceae and is endemic to southern Australia. It is a herb with egg-shaped to lance-shaped leaves with the narrower end towards the base, and racemes of yellow flowers.

== Description ==
Goodenia blackiana is a prostrate to ascending perennial herb that typically grows to a height of 200 mm (7.9 in), with stems up to 200 mm (7.9 in) long. The leaves are mostly at the base of the plant, egg-shaped to lance-shaped with the narrower end towards the base, 20–60 mm (0.79–2.36 in) long and 5–15 mm (0.20–0.59 in) wide, with cottony, woolly hairs on the lower surface. The flowers are arranged in racemes up to 50 mm (2.0 in) long on a peduncle 30–50 mm (1.2–2.0 in) long, or are solitary in leaf axils. Each flower is on a pedicel 30–50 mm (1.2–2.0 in) long with a linear bracteoles 5–12 mm (0.20–0.47 in) long at the base. The sepals are narrow oblong to egg-shaped, 4–5 mm (0.16–0.20 in) long, the petals yellow, 13–14 mm (0.51–0.55 in) long. The lower lobes of the corolla are 5–6 mm (0.20–0.24 in) long with wings about 2 mm (0.079 in) wide. Flowering mainly occurs from September to January and the fruit is a more or less cylindrical capsule about 10 mm (0.39 in) long.

== Taxonomy and naming ==
Goodenia blackiana was first formally described in 1992 by Roger Charles Carolin in the Flora of Australia from material collected in the Grampians in 1953.

== Distribution and habitat ==
This goodenia grows in mallee, woodland and grassland in scattered locations in western and northern Victoria and south-eastern South Australia.
