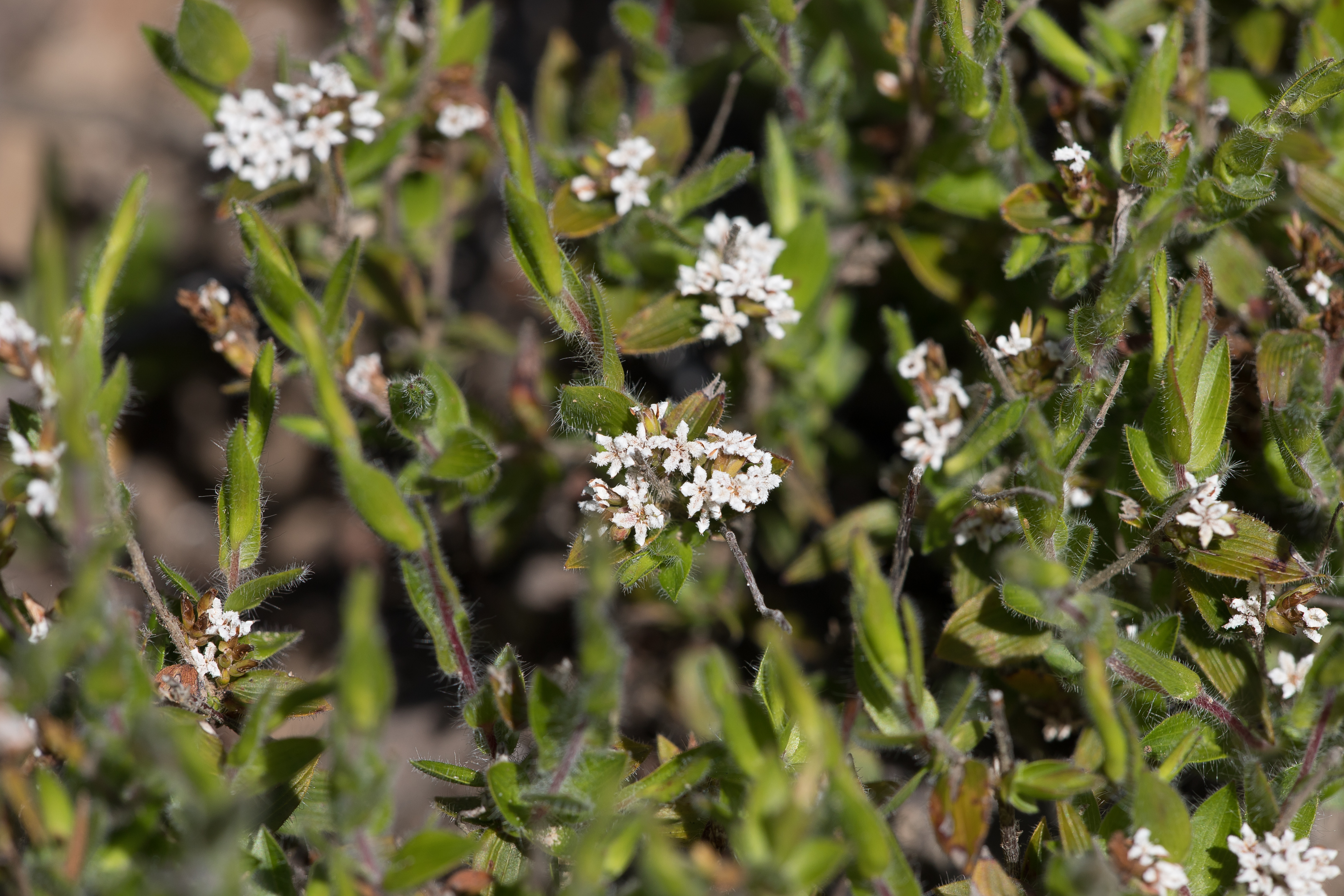
- In Kyeema Conservation Park

Scientific classification
- Kingdom: Plantae
- Clade: Tracheophytes
- Clade: Angiosperms
- Clade: Eudicots
- Clade: Asterids
- Order: Ericales
- Family: Ericaceae
- Genus: Leucopogon
- Species: L. concurvus

Binomial name
- Leucopogon concurvus F.Muell.
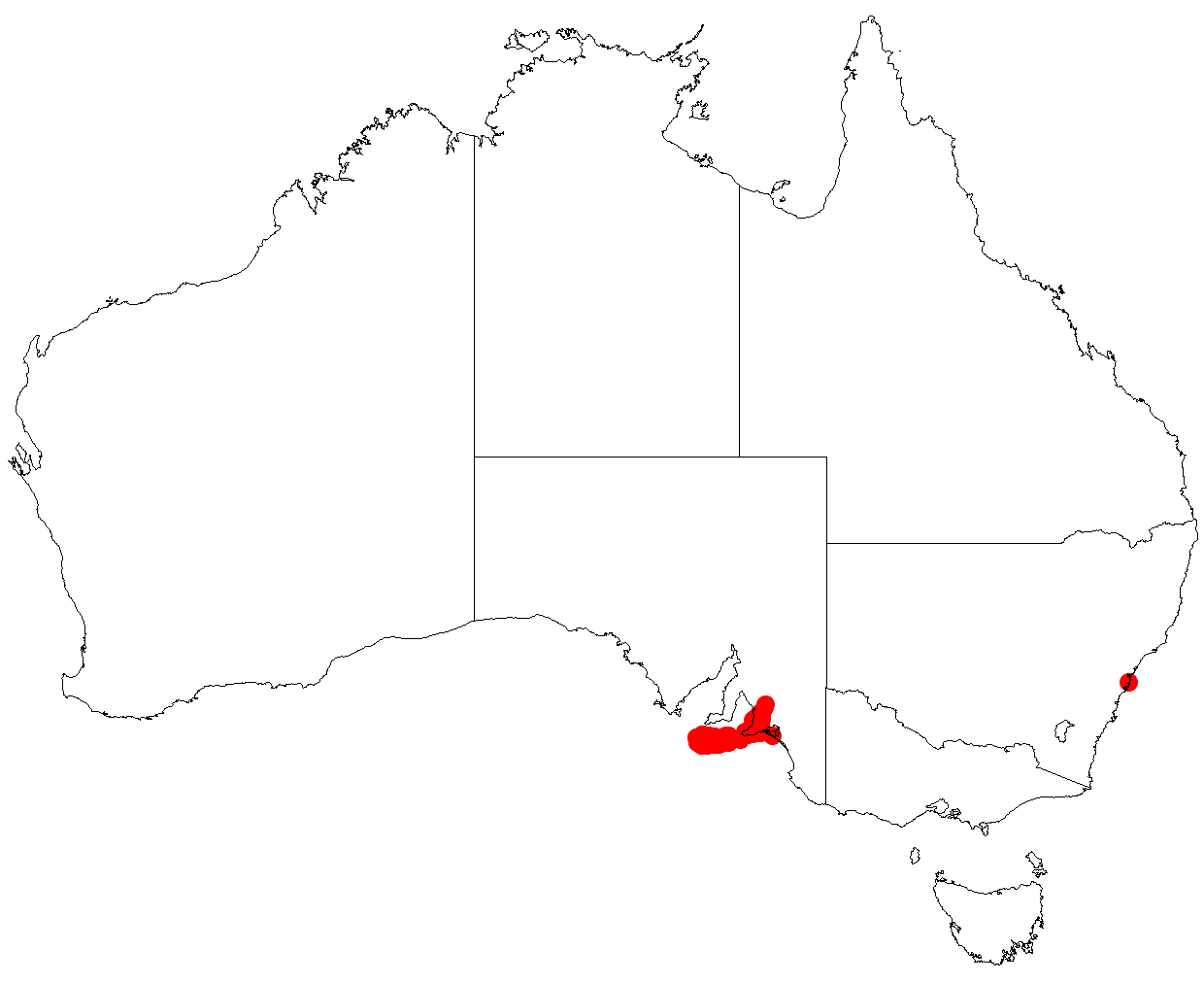
- Occurrence data from AVH

Synonyms
- Styphelia concurva (F.Muell.) F.Muell.; Leucopogon apiculatus auct. non R.Br.: Sonder, O.W. (1854)

= Leucopogon concurvus =

Species of plant

Leucopogon concurvus is a species of flowering plant in the heath family Ericaceae and is endemic to a restricted part of South Australia. It is a slender shrub with egg-shaped leaves, and white, tube-shaped flowers arranged along the branches.

== Description ==
Leucopogon collinus is a slender shrub that typically grows to a height of 30–60 cm (12–24 in). Its leaves are egg-shaped, 3.6–17 mm (0.14–0.67 in) long and 1.1–6 mm (0.043–0.236 in) wide and sessile or on a petiole up to 0.3–1 mm (0.012–0.039 in) long. The upper surface of the leaves is glabrous and the lower surface usually covered with bristly hairs. The flowers are arranged in spikes 4–10 mm (0.16–0.39 in) long on the ends of branches, or singly in four to twelve upper leaf axils with egg-shaped bracts and bracteoles 1.5–2.2 mm (0.059–0.087 in) long. The sepals are triangular, 2.2–3.3 mm (0.087–0.130 in) long, the petals white and joined at the base to form a cylindrical tube 1.7–1.7 mm (0.067–0.067 in) long, the lobes 1.7–2.5 mm (0.067–0.098 in) long and densely bearded on the inside. The anthers and style do not extend beyond the end of the petal tube. Flowering occurs from July to October and is followed by an oblong drupe 1.7–1.8 mm (0.07–0.07 in) long.

== Taxonomy ==
Leucopogon concurvus was first formally described in 1863 by Ferdinand von Mueller in his Fragmenta Phytographiae Australiae.

== Distribution and habitat ==
This leucopogon grows in forest, mallee scrub and heath, sometimes near the edge of swamps and in endemic to the southern Mount Lofty Ranges and Kangaroo Island in South Australia.
