= YSCC =

YSCC may refer to:

- YSCC Yokohama, a Japanese multisports club based in Yokohama
- The ICAO code for Scott Creek Airport, an airstrip in South Australia
- Yankee Small College Conference, a USCAA athletic conference
