= ForestrySA =

Agency overview
- Formed: 1 January 2001
- Superseding agency: Department of Woods and Forests
- Jurisdiction: South Australia
- Employees: 93 (2014)
- Agency executive: Adrian Hatch, Chief Executive
- Website: www.forestrysa.com.au

ForestrySA, formerly the South Australian Forestry Corporation, is a business enterprise owned by the Government of South Australia that is responsible for management of publicly owned plantation forests in South Australia including the commercial production of timber and the management of forests for non-commercial purposes such as community use and as protected areas.

== History ==
The South Australian Forestry Corporation was established on 1 January 2001 under the South Australian Forestry Corporation Act 2000 from the assets remaining from former government entities such as the former Department of Woods and Forests.

The corporation operates under the name ForestrySA which was previously used as the name of a unit within the former South Australian government department, the Department for Administrative and Information Services.

== Purpose ==
=== Generally ===
ForestrySA has responsibility for the management of forestry reserves in three parts of South Australia which it describes in its publications as “regions” with the following names - Green Triangle Region, Mount Lofty Ranges Forest Reserves and the Northern Forests Region.

=== Commercial operations ===
As a commercial operator, ForestrySA is responsible for the management of plantation forests in the Green Triangle region for the on behalf of the plantation owner, OneFortyOne Plantations Pty Ltd, and in the Mount Lofty Ranges and Northern Forest regions on behalf of the Government of South Australia. The plantations are reported in 2014 as covering an area greater than 95,000 hectares (230,000 acres) and as being planted principally with softwood timber. The focus of the commercial operation is the production of log and chip, which is used to produce the following products - sawn timber, pulp, paper and posts. The Green Triangle region operation will be reduced from 17 October 2017 when responsibility for plantation management is transferred to OneFortyOne Plantations Pty Ltd.

=== Non-commercial operations ===
ForestrySA is required by its charter to manage the following non-commercial activities:

- native forest management
- Community use of forests
- Forestry industry development
- Community protection (Including fire) and forest industry support activities
- Other activities as directed by the Minister of Forests
- Management of the Mid North forests

== Forestry assets under management ==
As of 2014, ForestrySA was responsible for a total of thirteen forests in its three regions.

=== Green Triangle Region ===
The Green Triangle Region consists of the following six forests located in the south east of South Australia within the region known as the Limestone Coast and covering an area from about 280 kilometres (170 miles) to about 390 kilometres (240 miles) to the south-east of the Adelaide central business district:

- Noolook Forest located north-east of Robe
- Mount Burr Forest located east of Millicent
- Mount Gambier Forest located south-west of Mount Gambier
- Penola Forest located south-west of Penola
- Comaum Forest located between Naracoorte in the north and Penola in the south.
- Myora Forest located south-east of Mount Gambier

=== Mount Lofty Ranges Forest Reserves ===
The Mount Lofty Ranges Forest Reserves consists of the three following forests located in the Mount Lofty Ranges and covering an approximate area of 19,500 hectares (48,000 acres)

- Mount Crawford Forest located near the town of Williamstown in the Adelaide Hills about 30 kilometres (19 miles) to the north-east of the Adelaide central business district
- Kuitpo Forest located near the town of Meadows in the Adelaide Hills about 30 kilometres (19 miles) to the south-east of the Adelaide central business district
- Second Valley Forest located between the town of Delamere and the city of Victor Harbor on the Fleurieu Peninsula about 70 kilometres (43 miles) to the south of the Adelaide central business district

=== Northern Forests Region ===
The Northern Forests Region (also called the Mid North Region) consists of the four following forests:

- Bundaleer Forest located in the Northern Mount Lofty Ranges about 185 kilometres (115 miles) north of Adelaide central business district and about 5 kilometres (3.1 miles) south-west of the town of Jamestown and consists of an area of 3,138 hectares (7,750 acres)
- Wirrabara Forest located west of the town of Wirrabara in the Southern Flinders Ranges about 220 kilometres (140 miles) north of the Adelaide central business district and consists of an area of 6,947 hectares (17,170 acres)
- Yarcowie Forest located south of the town of Whyte Yarcowie and consists of an area of 39.9 hectares (99 acres)
- Leighton Forest located west of the town of Burra and consists of an area of 38.3 hectares (95 acres)

== Corporate governance ==
Forestry SA as the statutory corporation established in 2001 by the South Australian Forestry Corporation Act 2000 operates as “a business enterprise with the principal responsibility of managing plantation forests for the benefit of the people and economy of the State.” The operation is overseen by a board which is responsible to the South Australian Minister of Forests as per the “Act” and to both the minister and to the South Australian Treasurer as per a charter enacted in 2014 following the sale of three crops of timber (known as “three forward rotations”) from plantations in the Green Triangle region to OneFortyOne Plantations Pty Ltd in 2012.

== See also ==
- Forests of Australia
- Protected areas of South Australia
