= McLaren Flat, South Australia =

McLaren Flat
- Town
- Coordinates: 35°12′29″S 138°35′12″E
- Country: Australia
- State: South Australia
- Region: Southern Adelaide
- LGA: City of Onkaparinga
- Location: 31 km (19 mi) S of Adelaide city centre; 11 km (6.8 mi) SE of Noarlunga Centre

Government
  - State electorate: Mawson
  - Federal division: Division of Mayo

Population
  - Total: 1,175 (UCL 2021)
- Time zone: UTC+9:30 (ACST)
  - Summer (DST): UTC+10:30 (ACST)
- Postcode: 5171
- County: Adelaide
Localities around McLaren Flat
McLaren Vale	Blewitt Springs; Kangarilla	Kangarilla
McLaren Vale	McLaren Flat	Kangarilla; Kuitpo
McLaren Vale	McLaren Vale; The Range; Kuitpo	Kuitpo
- Locations; Adjoining localities

McLaren Flat is a township in the McLaren Vale/Willunga basin south of Adelaide. McLaren Flat is on the sprawling flat land to the east of the town of McLaren Vale on the road to Kangarilla. At the 2016 census, the locality had a population of 1,537 of which 1,121 lived in its town centre.

McLaren Flat is located within the McLaren Vale wine region. The area surrounding the town is planted to vineyards and several wineries are located in the immediate area. It has a population of 600. It shares the same post code as McLaren Vale (5171) but has a different telephone exchange (8383...). McLaren Flat has its own primary school, however all of the town's sports teams are joined with the neighbouring town of McLaren Vale and known as McLaren Districts.

McLaren Flat is in the City of Onkaparinga. It is in Mawson. It is also on the boundary of the federal electorates of Kingston and Mayo .
