= Culture of South Australia =

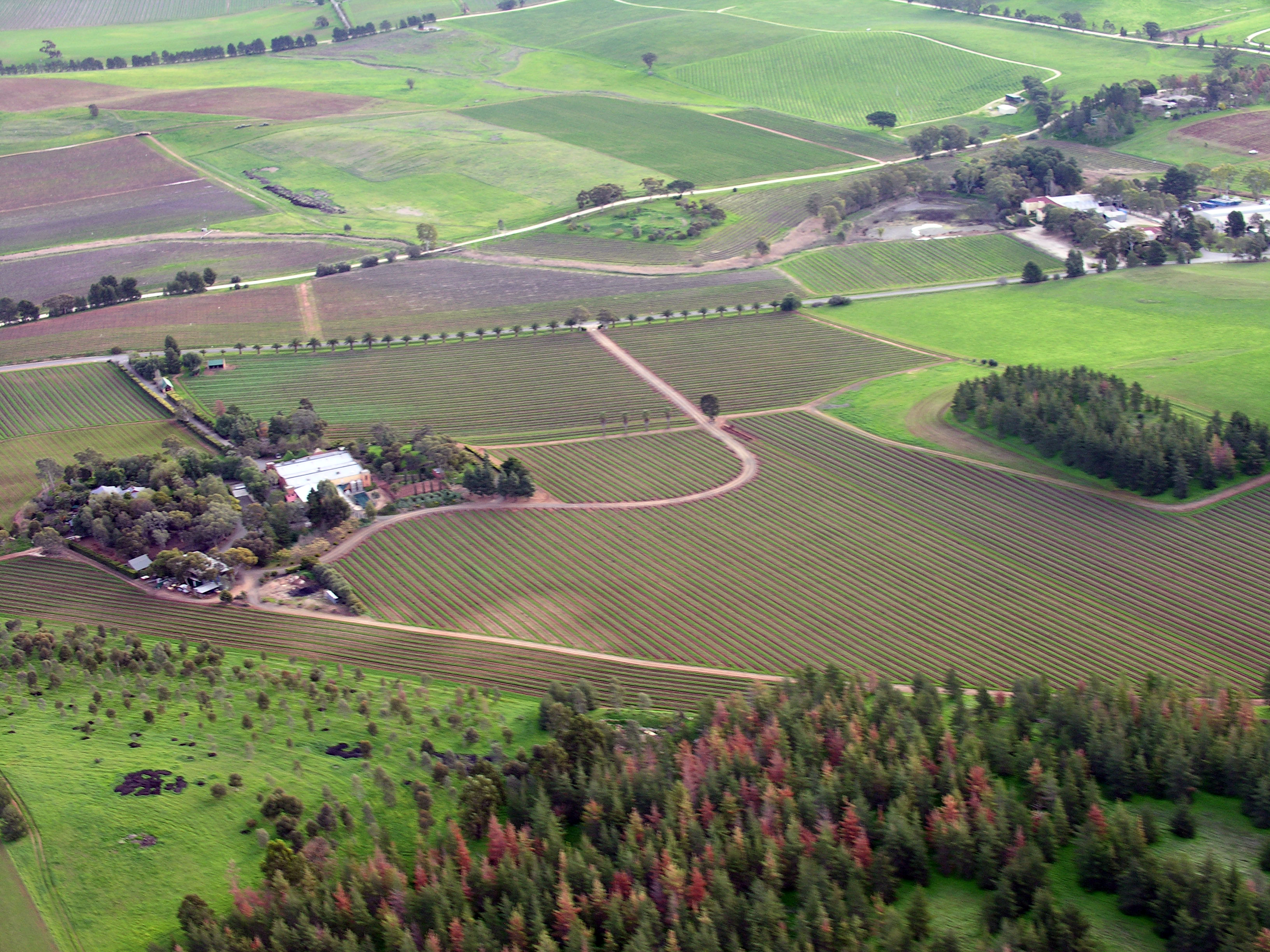
The Barossa Valley is a significant wine-producing region and a popular tourist destination.

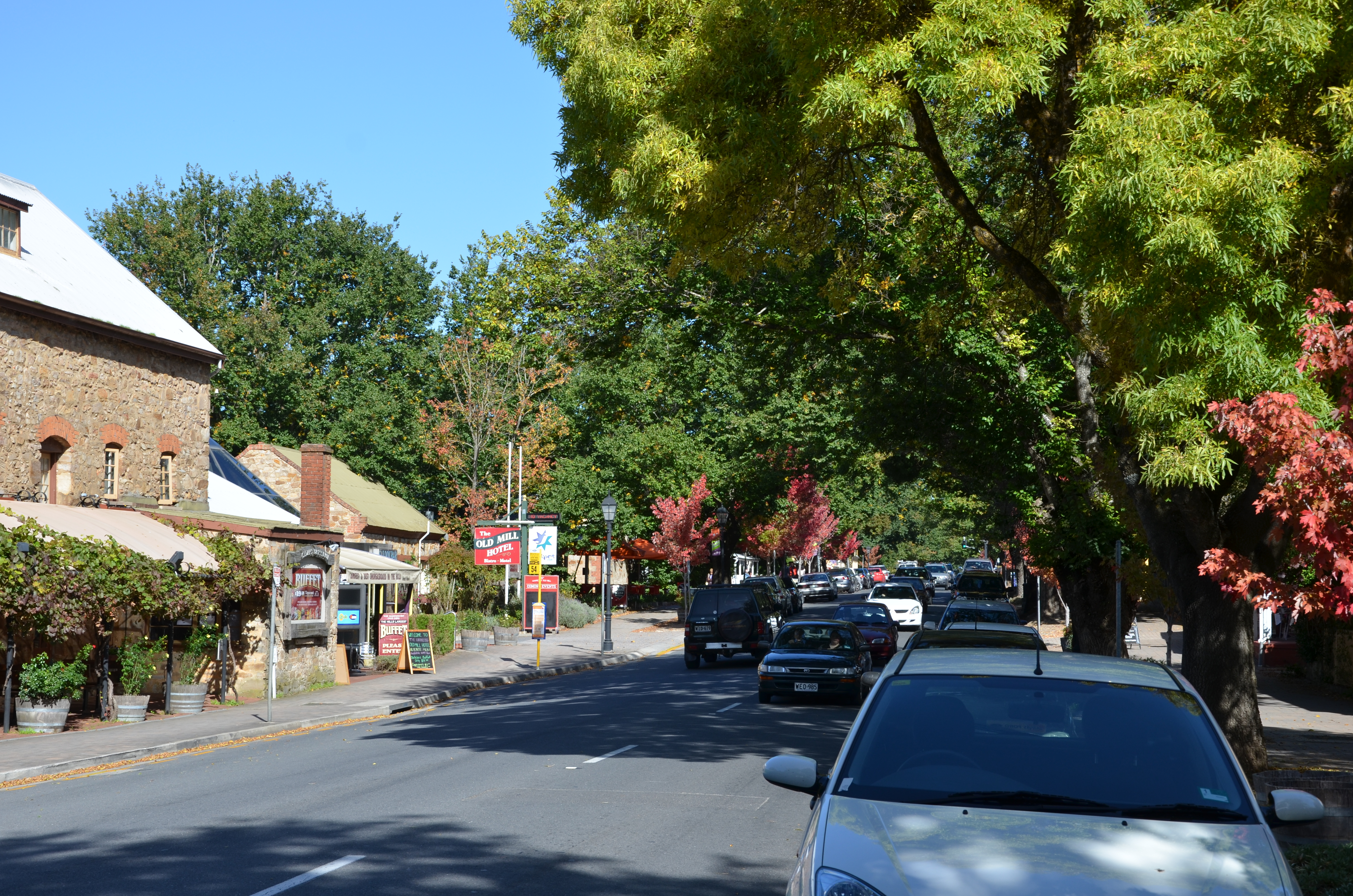
The town of Hahndorf, with its strong German history and population, reflects South Australia's early European immigration trends.

South Australia (state of Australia) has a variety of wine-producing regions, including the popular tourist destination Barossa Valley. A majority of the population is concentrated around the Adelaide metropolitan area.

The Adelaide Hills features many European-style villages and small towns from the state's immigration trends dating back to the 1880s. In sports, the state has the second highest rate of event attendance of all states and territories, with 49% of South Australians aged 15 years and over attending a sporting event each year.

Some scenes of the internationally acclaimed Picnic at Hanging Rock were filmed in the rural areas of the state such as Martindale Hall.

== See also ==
- Tourism in Australia
- Music of Australia
- South Australian Museum
