= Totness Recreation Park =

Protected area in South Australia

- IUCN category III (natural monument or feature)
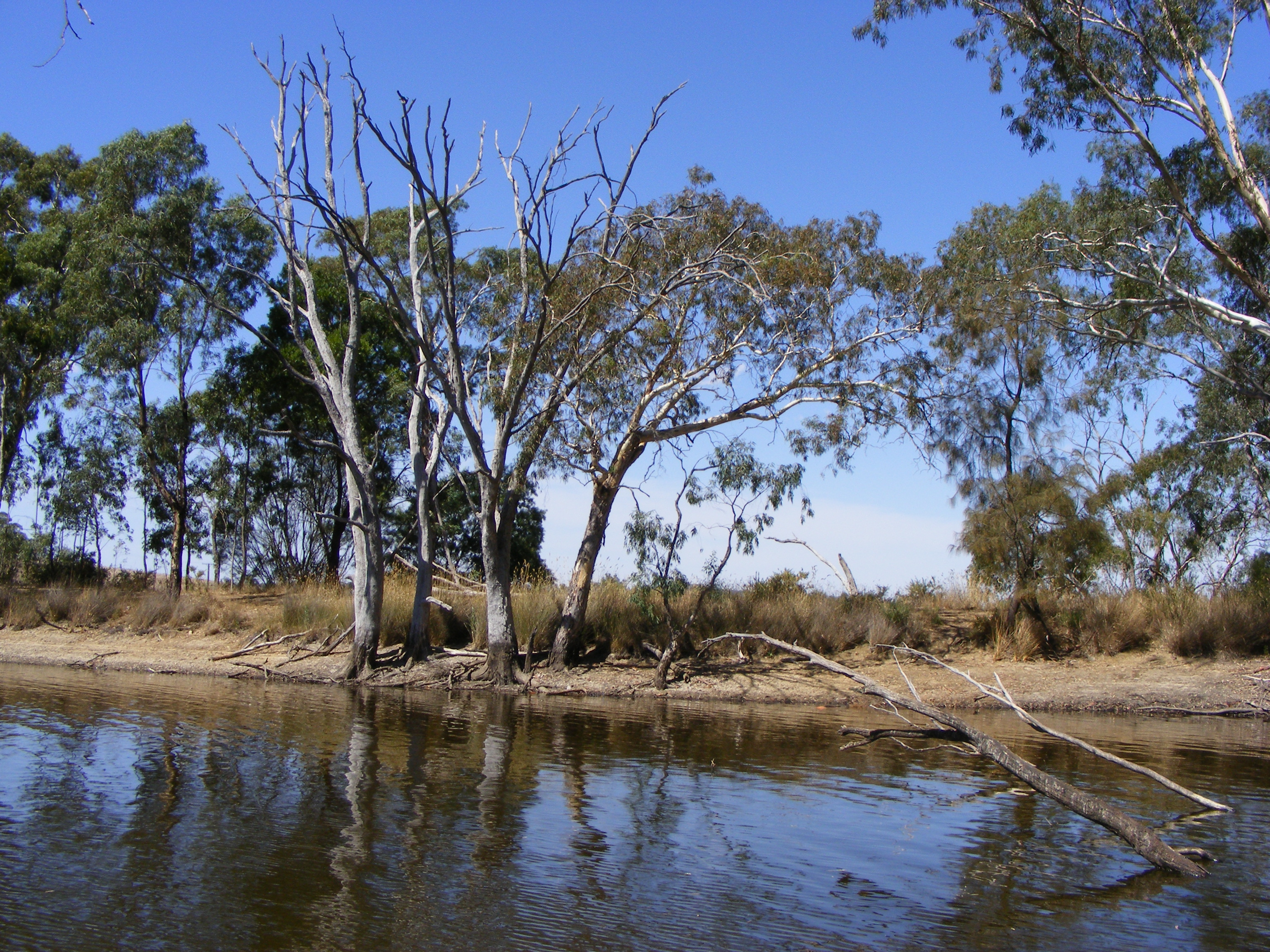
- Railway dam in Totness Recreation Park

- Location within South Australia
- Location: South Australia
- Nearest city: Mount Barker
- Coordinates: 35°03′32″S 138°50′02″E
- Area: 41 ha (100 acres)
- Established: 15 January 1970
- Visitors: "quite low"' (in 2007)
- Governing body: Department for Environment and Water

Totness Recreation Park (formerly Totness National Parks Reserve) is a protected area in the Australian state of South Australia located within the localities of Mount Barker and Totness in the central Mount Lofty Ranges. Covering 41 hectares (101 acres) of land, the park is divided by the South Eastern Freeway and features a large dam. It was declared as a reserve in 1970 and re-designated as a recreation park in 1972. The park has no visitor facilities except for access tracks. It is the only park in the district, managed by the Department of Environment and Water, that is solely designated for recreation.

While parts of the park are dominated by pest plant species, primarily gorse and blackberry, it has native plant communities that are of conservation significance. messmate stringybark and manna gum woodlands are of particular note, being now uncommon in much of their former range across the Mount Lofty Ranges.

== Description ==
Totness Recreation Park is located about 25 kilometres (16 mi) south-east of the Adelaide city centre and about 2.5 kilometres (1.6 mi) north-west of the town of Mount Barker.

The park covers 41 hectares (101 acres) but is divided by the South Eastern Freeway, with 9 ha (22 acres) north of the freeway and 32 ha (79 acres) on its south. The only connection between the two sections is a 1.5-metre (5 ft) high, 100 m (328 ft) long, concrete storm water pipe that passes under the freeway. 5.8 ha (14 acres) of the park's southern section is leased for grazing, and fenced off from public access.

The park is surrounded by rural properties that are primarily used for grazing. The most prominent feature is a former railway dam in the northern section. Most of the park, and some adjacent rural properties, drain into this dam. Overflow from the dam eventually reaches the Mount Barker Creek and subsequently the Bremer River.

There are walking trails throughout the park and dirt vehicle access tracks along the boundaries. A boardwalk, constructed in 2001 in the northern section adjacent to the freeway, enables passage through boggy areas. Apart from the boardwalk there are no built structures and no facilities nor interpretive signs.

The park occupies hill slopes on the eastern side of a ridgeline. The ridge runs from the Bull Creek Range, diving the catchments of the Onkaparinga and Bremer rivers. Quartzite and sandstone rocks feature in the park's geological formations. The well-drained podsolic soils of the park are strongly leached and infertile. Soils on the slopes have low water holding capacity and are poor for root development. Soils in the bases of gullies can be deep, and wetter areas become boggy in winter.

The recreation park is classified as an IUCN Category III protected area.

== Management and access ==
The park is part of the traditional lands of the Peramangk Aboriginal Tribe though no cultural artefacts have been found and aboriginal heritage on the site has not been formally investigated. It is managed by the Department of Environment and Water (DEW) in association with the Friends of Totness volunteer group. Totness Recreation Park forms part of Yurrebilla; the Greater Mounty Lofty Parklands. Within the Mount Barker District, it is the only DEH reserve that is dedicated for public recreation. Most of the park is a "Conservation Zone" with no bicycles, swimming, camping, motor vehicles, horse riding or dogs allowed; though dogs on leads are allowed in the northern section and it is recognised that the rules on swimming, dogs and horse riding are not honoured. As with the rest of Adelaide the area has a Mediterranean climate, with cool wet winters and warm to hot and dry summers. Average annual rainfall is 780 millimetres (31 in), mostly falling from May to August.

== History ==
The land within the recreation park first acquired protected area status as the Totness National Parks Reserve proclaimed under the National Parks Act 1966 on 15 January 1970. The national parks reserve was re-proclaimed under the National Parks and Wildlife Act 1972 as Totness Recreation Park on 27 April 1972.

In 1980, the recreation park was listed on the former Register of the National Estate.

On 16 February 1983, the section south of the freeway was completely burnt out by the Ash Wednesday bushfires. The fire was stopped by the dividing road and the two sections now show different growth patterns with mallee or coppiced regrowth in the south and mature woodland in the north.

== Prior use of the land ==
Most of the park forms a watershed for the large dam in the northern section. This dam was constructed in 1884 and used by the South Australian Railways to refill steam locomotives. Until 1944 water was piped around 2.4 km to the Mount Barker Railway Station, mainly for use on trains travelling to Victor Harbour. The dam also served as a water source for the township of Mount Barker, until replaced by water from the River Murray via the Mannum–Adelaide pipeline in 1955.

The southern section of the park was originally granted to John Dunne in 1853, a significant figure in Mt Barker's early history. The area around the dam was leased by the District Council of Mount Barker for wood and bark harvesting. The bark of the golden wattle (Acacia pycnantha) was taken for use in the Mount Barker tannery and messmate stringybark (Eucalyptus obliqua) trees were cut for firewood. Until 1970 the park's land belonged to the South Australian Railways and the state government Department of Transport.

== Flora and fauna ==
=== Flora ===
When created, the park's north was dominated by gorse, dog rose and blackberry and the south was regrowing from timber cutting. Gorse was dominant enough that the park had been referred to as "Gorse Park". Introduced plants were a major issue and still dominate some areas. Park management, to 2007, has been largely directed at controlling gorse. Undergrowth is slashed each year to manage the fuel load for bushfires.

Over 180 native plant species and 46 weed species have been identified. Gorse, blackberry and bridal creeper are listed as Weeds of National Significance; they are seen as South Australia's most environmentally threatening weeds. Blackberry, dog rose and African daisy are mainly confined to drainage lines and areas near the Dam. Montpellier broom (Genista monspessulana) is another prominent weed in the park. Phalaris dominates much of the leased area. In the early 21st century two new weed species were found: pussy-tails (Pentaschistis thunbergia) and African orchids (Disa bracteata). Cinnamon fungus (Phytophtora cinnamomi) is a significant pathogen, damaging plant species throughout the Adelaide hills. It has not been found yet in the park, but is suspected as being present in the southern section. The park has native plant communities that are of conservation significance due to their rarity in the contemporary Adelaide Hills including messmate stringybark (Eucalyptus obliqua) woodland and open forest, and manna gum (Eucalyptus viminalis) woodland.

=== Fauna ===
Thirty six native bird species have been recorded within the park. The large eucalypts in the north provide nestinge sites for Adelaide rosellas (Platycercus elegans) and kookaburras (Dacelo novaeguineae). Some of the species seen are noted as having significant conservation value, either in the Mount Lofty Ranges or in the entire of South Australia. These include yellow-tailed black cockatoo (Calyptorhynchus funereus), scarlet robin (Petroica multicolor boodang) and Bassian thrush (Zoothera lunulata). The dam, and environs, provide a habitat for ducks and water-birds. White-faced herons (Egretta novaehollandiae), cormorants and occasional Australian pelicans have been sighted. In 1980 some big-headed gudgeons (Philypnodon grandiceps), a small native fish, were released into the dam, presumably as food source for the introduced redfin perch (Perca fluviatilis) which are kept for recreational fishing.

Small numbers of western grey kangaroo (Macropus fuliginosus) shelter in the park during the day and feed in neighbouring pastures. Common ringtail possums (Pseudocheirus peregrinus), short-beaked echidna (Tachyglossus aculeatus) and various bat species are known to inhabit the park. Koalas are found in the park, though they are not native to the Mount Lofty Ranges. Introduced and feral animal species are commonly sighted including: European rabbits (Oryctolagus cuniculus), brown hares (Lepus capensis), house mice (Mus musculus), black rats (Rattus rattus), red foxes (Vulpes vulpes) and deer (Dama dama). Cats and dogs (probably domestic strays) have been recorded as well as numerous introduced bird species. As of 2006 rabbits are the most significant pest species in the park; destroying soil structure and impeding the regeneration of native plants.
