= Kuitpo, South Australia =

Kuitpo
- Town
- Coordinates: 35°13′41″S 138°41′05″E
- Country: Australia
- State: South Australia
- LGA: Alexandrina Council
- Location: 7.6 km (4.7 mi) SSW of Meadows; 53.1 km (33.0 mi) S of Adelaide

Government
  - State electorate: Heysen
  - Federal division: Division of Mayo

Population
  - Total: 196 (2016 census)
- Postcode: 5201
- County: Adelaide
Localities around Kuitpo
Kangarilla	Kangarilla	Meadows
McLaren Flat; The Range	Kuitpo	Prospect Hill
Dingabledinga	Kyeema	Blackfellows Creek

Kuitpo /ˈkaɪpoʊ/ is a locality of South Australia in the Alexandrina Council area. Its major industries include forestry as exemplified through the Kuitpo Forest.

== Demographics ==
At the 2021 Census, Kuitpo had a population of 198 residents, with 52.5% male, and 47.5% female. The median age was 55. Persons identifying as Aboriginal or Torres Strait Islander comprised 2.5% of the population. Common ancestries included English (49.5%), Australian (46%), German (13.1%), and Irish (11.6%).

Most residents were born in Australia (82.2%). Religiously, "No religion" was reported by 62.6%, followed by Anglican (11.1%), Catholic (9.1%), and Uniting Church (3.5%).

== Climate ==
Climate data for Kuitpo, elevation 365 m (1,198 ft), (1998–2025 normals and extremes)
Month	Jan	Feb	Mar	Apr	May	Jun	Jul	Aug	Sep	Oct	Nov	Dec	Year
Record high °C (°F)	44.0 (111.2)	41.3 (106.3)	38.1 (100.6)	34.2 (93.6)	27.9 (82.2)	23.8 (74.8)	20.4 (68.7)	26.1 (79.0)	29.7 (85.5)	34.8 (94.6)	39.3 (102.7)	41.9 (107.4)	44.0 (111.2)
Mean daily maximum °C (°F)	26.2 (79.2)	25.7 (78.3)	23.3 (73.9)	19.7 (67.5)	15.9 (60.6)	13.0 (55.4)	12.4 (54.3)	13.6 (56.5)	16.2 (61.2)	18.8 (65.8)	21.7 (71.1)	24.0 (75.2)	19.2 (66.6)
Mean daily minimum °C (°F)	14.3 (57.7)	14.1 (57.4)	12.8 (55.0)	11.3 (52.3)	9.3 (48.7)	7.4 (45.3)	6.7 (44.1)	7.0 (44.6)	8.1 (46.6)	9.2 (48.6)	11.1 (52.0)	12.6 (54.7)	10.3 (50.5)
Record low °C (°F)	8.0 (46.4)	7.0 (44.6)	6.9 (44.4)	4.3 (39.7)	2.0 (35.6)	1.3 (34.3)	0.6 (33.1)	1.3 (34.3)	1.6 (34.9)	2.7 (36.9)	4.0 (39.2)	6.0 (42.8)	0.6 (33.1)
Average precipitation mm (inches)	28.6 (1.13)	23.5 (0.93)	31.5 (1.24)	54.2 (2.13)	85.9 (3.38)	112.3 (4.42)	105.5 (4.15)	92.5 (3.64)	74.4 (2.93)	51.5 (2.03)	40.7 (1.60)	35.8 (1.41)	735.4 (28.95)
Average precipitation days (≥ 0.2 mm)	6.7	7.1	9.8	13.4	17.4	19.6	20.9	19.4	16.7	14.0	10.9	9.8	165.7
Average afternoon relative humidity (%)	43	46	49	55	66	72	71	65	62	57	50	48	57
Source: Australian Bureau of Meteorology (humidity 1998–2010)

== See also ==
- Hundred of Kuitpo
