= Paechtown, South Australia =

Paechtown
- Town
- Interactive map of Paechtown
- Coordinates: 35.05°S 138.82°E
- Country: Australia
- State: South Australia
- LGA: District Council of Mount Barker
- Location: 2 km (1.2 mi) south of Hahndorf

Government
  - State electorate: Heysen
  - Federal division: Mayo

Population
  - Total: 204 (SAL 2021)
Localities around Paechtown
Hahndorf		Totness
	Paechtown
	Echunga	Mount Barker

Paechtown is a historic locality in the Adelaide Hills of South Australia. It is now on the southern side of the South Eastern Freeway almost opposite Hahndorf.

Johann Friedrich Wilhelm Paech had bought thirteen 80-acre sections, named Friedrichstadt (German: [ˈfʁiːdʁɪçˌʃtat]), with the name particularly applied to a subdivision of section 3913, Hundred of Kuitpo. The name Friedrichstadt was replaced by Tangari in 1918 as part of renaming many places with German-origin names, however neither name is used today.

Paechtown is named for another early landowner, Christian Paech (unrelated to Johann Friedrich). The village was established in subdivisions of sections 3916 and 3917, Hundred of Kuitpo.

There are a number of historic German-style half-timbered houses in the village. There had been quite a few more until they were destroyed by the Ash Wednesday bushfires in 1983. J.F. Paech's 1840s farmhouse and outbuildings have survived.
