= Dorset Vale, South Australia =

Dorset Vale
- Town
- Coordinates: 35.087330°S 138.676420°E
- Country: Australia
- State: South Australia
- Region: Adelaide Hills; Southern Adelaide
- City: Adelaide
- LGAs: Adelaide Hills Council; City of Onkaparinga; District Council of Mount Barker
- Established: 1850

Population
  - Total: 0 (SAL 2016)
- Postcode: 5157
- County: Adelaide
Localities around Dorset Vale
Cherry Gardens	Scott Creek	Bradbury
Clarendon	Dorset Vale	Jupiter Creek
	Kangarilla	Meadows

Dorset Vale is a rural locality near Adelaide, South Australia. It straddles three local government areas adjacent to the Onkaparinga River, being within the Adelaide Hills, Mount Barker and the Onkaparinga council areas. The precise boundaries were set in April 1994 and extended in November 2003 for the long-established name. The first post office in the area was given the English name Dorset Vale circa 1850, but it was locally known as "Scotts Bottom" as it was downstream from Scott Creek. Scotts Bottom School opened in 1930, its name was changed to Dorset Vale in 1937 and it closed in 1944.

Dorset Vale includes the Scott Creek Conservation Park.The area would have been used by the Peramangk people before European settlement began in the late 1830s. The Scott Creek area including Dorset Vale was mined for copper and silver in the 19th century. Copper was discovered in 1850, and silver soon after. Mining ceased in 1887 after extraction of 10 000 ounces (310 kg) of silver.

== See also ==
- History of Adelaide
- European settlement of South Australia
