= Coromandel East, South Australia =

Coromandel East
- Suburb
- Country: Australia
- State: South Australia
- Region: Southern Adelaide
- City: Adelaide
- LGA: City of Onkaparinga
- Location: 17 km (11 mi) from Adelaide

Government
  - State electorate: Waite
  - Federal division: Mayo

Population
  - Total: 345 (SAL 2021)
- Postcode: 5157
- County: Adelaide
Suburbs around Coromandel East
Hawthorndene	Upper Sturt	Upper Sturt
Coromandel Valley	Coromandel East	Ironbank
Cherry Gardens	Cherry Gardens	Cherry Gardens

Coromandel East is a semi-rural suburb of Adelaide, South Australia. It lies within the City of Onkaparinga and has postcode 5157.

Coromandel East, and its neighbouring suburb, Coromandel Valley, gain their name from a ship, the Coromandel, which arrived in Holdfast Bay from London in 1837 with 156 English settlers. The ship was in turn named after the Coromandel Coast in India. After the ship reached the shore, some of its sailors deserted, intending to remain behind in South Australia, and took refuge in the hills in the Coromandel Valley region.
