= Cherry Gardens, South Australia =

Cherry Gardens
- Town
- Country: Australia
- State: South Australia
- Region: Southern Adelaide
- LGA: City of Onkaparinga

Government
  - State electorate: Davenport
  - Federal division: Mayo

Population
  - Total: 633 (SAL 2021)
- Postcode: 5157
- County: Adelaide
Localities around Cherry Gardens
Coromandel East	Coromandel East	Ironbank
Aberfoyle Park	Cherry Gardens	Scott Creek
Happy Valley	Clarendon	Dorset Vale

Cherry Gardens is a semi-rural suburb of Adelaide, South Australia. It lies within the City of Onkaparinga.

== History ==
Cherry Gardens' early settlers included John and Benjamin Chambers, who were granted land in the area some time before 1844. The area was named for the native cherry (Exocarpos cupressiformis) which grew there in profusion.

Cherry Gardens Post Office first opened on 10 July 1850 and finally closed in 1976.

== Services ==
The Cherry Gardens brigade of the South Australian Country Fire Service provides service for water bomber aircraft at the Cherry Gardens Airstrip.

In January 2021, a fire started in the Cherry Gardens area and destroyed two houses.
