= Scott Creek, South Australia =

Scott Creek
- Town
- Coordinates: 35.057°S 138.705°E
- Country: Australia
- State: South Australia
- LGA: Adelaide Hills Council
- Location: 6 km (3.7 mi) west of Mylor; 8 km (5.0 mi) south of Stirling
- Established: 1969

Government
  - State electorate: Heysen
  - Federal division: Mayo

Population
  - Total: 225 (SAL 2021)
- Postcode: 5153
Localities around Scott Creek
Ironbank		Longwood
Cherry Gardens	Scott Creek
	Dorset Vale	Bradbury

Scott Creek is a locality in the Adelaide Hills about 24 kilometres (15 mi) southeast of Adelaide in South Australia. It includes the "ceased Government Town" of Cotton.

Scott Creek has a primary school and a Soldiers' Memorial Hall. The school has 55-65 students.

The Scott Creek Conservation Park is south of Scott Creek, in the neighbouring locality of Dorset Vale.

Both the town and the conservation park are named for the creek that flows through them. They would have been used by the Peramangk people before European settlement began in the late 1830s. Copper was discovered in 1850, and silver soon after. Mining ceased in 1887 after extraction of 10 000 ounces (310 kg) of silver.

Scott Creek Airport is a small grass airstrip in nearby Clarendon which is used to support South Australian Country Fire Service water bombing aircraft.
