= Prospect Hill, South Australia =

Prospect Hill
- Town
- Coordinates: 35.22°S 138.73°E
- Country: Australia
- State: South Australia
- LGAs: District Council of Mount Barker; Alexandrina Council
- Location: 7 km (4.3 mi) south of Meadows; 46 km (29 mi) south of Adelaide

Government
  - State electorate: Heysen
  - Federal division: Mayo
- Elevation: 400 m (1,300 ft)

Population
  - Total: 159
- Postcode: 5201
Localities around Prospect Hill
Kuitpo	Meadows	Bull Creek
Kuitpo	Prospect Hill	Bull Creek
Blackfellows Creek	McHarg Creek	McHarg Creek

Prospect Hill is a small town in the southern Adelaide Hills of South Australia. Its major industries are forestry in Kuitpo Forest and dairy farming. The area also features a series of mountain bike trails.

Prospect Hill was significantly damaged by the Ash Wednesday bushfires in 1983. The town lost the scout hall, general store building, former school building, CWA hall, and library alongside 16 houses.

== History ==
The area of land surrounding Prospect Hill is the traditional land of the Peramangk tribe.

The first European activities in the Prospect Hill area begun with the arrival of William and Jane Michelmore, who settled in proximity to the intersections of Prospect Hill and Meadow Creek. The Prospect Hill area was then formally surveyed in 1840, by Thomas Burr, and again in 1856. The town experienced a period of significant growth through the 1870s, through the addition of a general store in 1872, alongside a church, and spring cart service to Adelaide both of which opened in 1873.

This period of growth further saw further additions to the town including the Prospect Hill primary school (1887–1962). As well as the introduction of the towns titular name in 1873, the towns expansion facilitated an increase in industry, as exemplified by the establishment of a nearby sawmill, before its destruction by fire in the summer of 1887–1888.

The town features a listing on the South Australian Heritage Register for the Prospect Hill Museum (formerly the general store).

== Demographics ==
At the 2021 Census, Prospect Hill had 158 residents, with 50.6% male, and 49.4% female. The median age was 47. No residents identified as Aboriginal or Torres Strait Islander. Common ancestries included Australian (43%), English (41.1%), Scottish (11.4%), and German (8.9%).

Most residents were born in Australia (81%). Religiously, "No religion" was reported by 54.4%, followed by Catholic (8.9%), Uniting Church (8.9%), and Lutheran (7%).
