= Totness, South Australia =

Totness
- Town
- Coordinates: 35°03′0″S 138°50′0″E
- Country: Australia
- State: South Australia
- LGA: District Council of Mount Barker
- Location: 2 km (1.2 mi) from Mount Barker; 1 km (0.62 mi) from Littlehampton
- Established: 2005

Government
  - State electorate: Kavel
  - Federal division: Mayo

Population
  - Total: 96 (SAL 2021)
- Postcode: 5250
Localities around Totness
Hahndorf	Balhannah
Paechtown	Totness	Littlehampton
Mount Barker	Mount Barker	Mount Barker

Totness is a locality in the Adelaide Hills, South Australia, situated near Mount Barker and Littlehampton. It primarily comprises industrial/commercial/rural areas with some now rezoned employment lands. Although commonly referred to as part of Mount Barker Totness was separated from the main township of Mount Barker by the construction of the South Eastern Freeway in 1977. The oldest surviving building in the Mount Barker area, a windmill, is located within Totness.

Totness is located approximately 2 kilometres (1.2 mi) from the Mount Barker Post Office and 1 kilometre (0.62 mi) from the Littlehampton Post Office. Due to urban expansion, the boundaries between the three areas have become increasingly indistinct.

The locality is home to the Totness Recreation Park, which can be accessed via Innovation Drive, part of the modern Employment Lands development known as the Totness Precinct.

Totness was first subdivided in the 1880s, without regard to its contours. Part of the 1970 film Ned Kelly, starring Mick Jagger, was filmed on Totness Road.
