= Bugle Ranges, South Australia =

Bugle Ranges South Australia
- Coordinates: 35.1381°S 138.8756°E
- Population: 289 (SAL 2021)
- Postcode(s): 5251
- Elevation: 354 m (1,161 ft)
- LGA(s): District Council of Mount Barker
- State electorate(s): Electoral district of Heysen
- Federal division(s): Division of Mayo
Localities around Bugle Ranges:
Echunga	Mount Barker	Wistow
Flaxley	Bugle Ranges
Macclesfield	Gemmells	Highland Valley

Bugle Ranges is a locality on the Adelaide Hills of South Australia. It lies between Mount Barker and Strathalbyn, both by road and on the Victor Harbor railway line. Little remains of the village.

The Bugle Inn was a licensed establishment. The licence was first granted to Frederick Rumble in 1852, then Walton in 1853. In 1856 the licence was transferred to first, Robert Sleep., then to William Kimber. The Inn appears to have only operated for a few years and was closed, remaining in use only as a landmark. Robert Sleep remained in the area until his death in 1898.

An annual Bugle Ranges ploughing match, held each year in September, was reported in the papers between 1853 and 1857 inclusive. During this time period, newspapers reported ploughing matches in many Adelaide Plains, Adelaide Hills and Fleurieu Peninsula centres.
