= Jupiter Creek, South Australia =

Jupiter Creek Adelaide, South Australia
- Coordinates: 35°07′0″S 138°46′0″E
- Population: 231 (SAL 2021)
- Postcode(s): 5153
- LGA(s): District Council of Mount Barker
Suburbs around Jupiter Creek:
Bradbury	Chapel Hill
Dorset Vale	Jupiter Creek	Echunga
Kangarilla	Meadows

Jupiter Creek (postcode 5153) is a semi-rural suburb of Adelaide, South Australia. It lies within the District Council of Mount Barker, west of Echunga.

== Gold Diggings ==
It is part of the former goldmining area the Battunga Country. Jupiter Creek was the site of a gold discovery in the mid-1800s, there still exists a fossicking reserve in the old diggings with an interpretive walking trail.
