= Wistow, South Australia =

Wistow
- Town
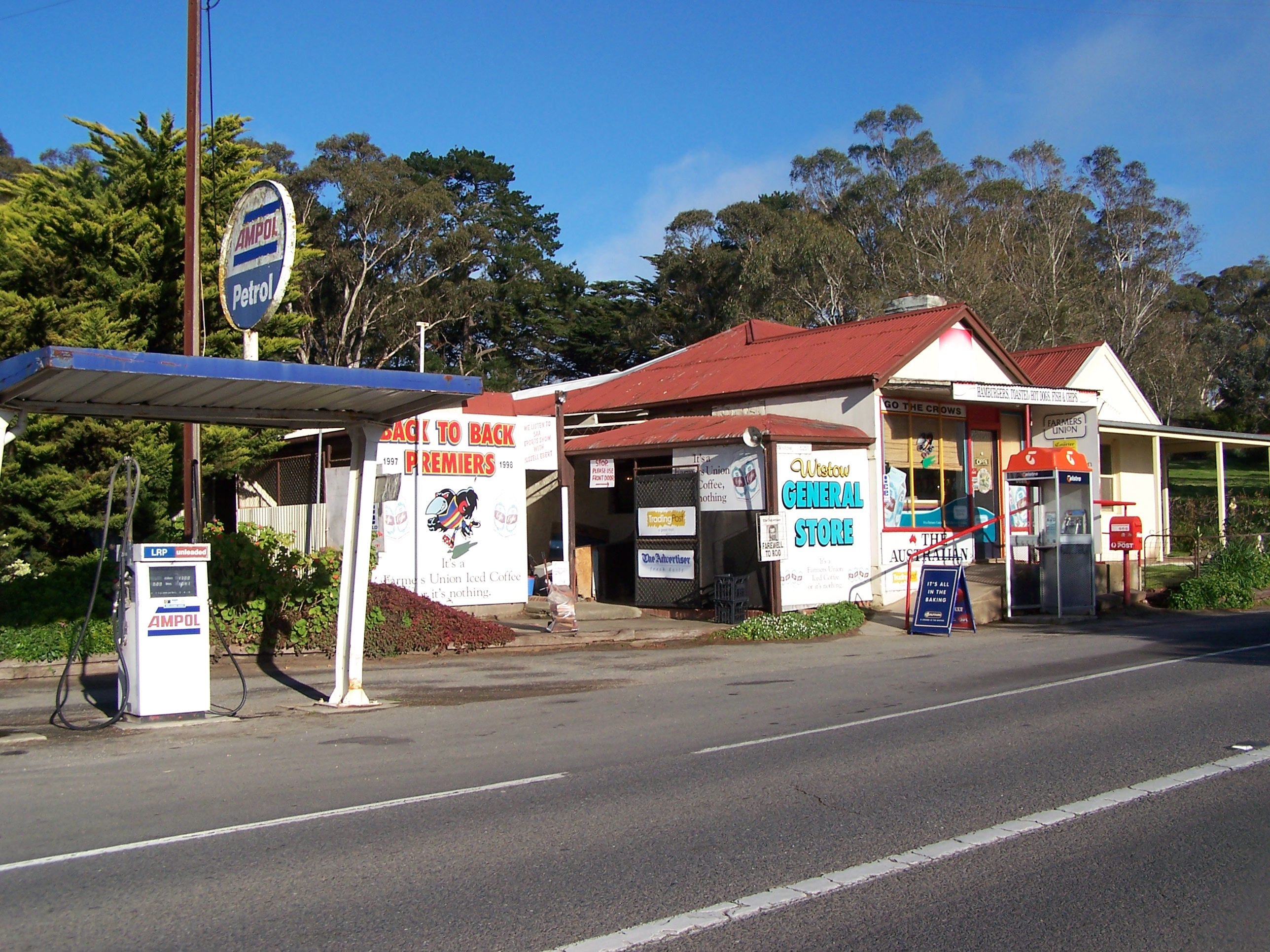
- Main street of Wistow

- Coordinates: 35°06′0″S 138°52′0″E
- Country: Australia
- State: South Australia
- LGA: Mount Barker
- Location: 39 km (24 mi) SE of Adelaide; 5.4 km (3.4 mi) SE of Mount Barker
- Established: 1859

Government
  - State electorate: Heysen
  - Federal division: Mayo

Population
  - Total: 285 (2021)
- Postcode: 5251
Localities around Wistow
Mount Barker	Mount Barker	Petwood
Mount Barker	Wistow	St Ives
Bugle Ranges	Bugle Ranges	Red Creek

Wistow is a small town, just outside Mount Barker, South Australia. Located at the intersection of Wellington Road (Mount Barker to Wellington) and Long Valley Road (Wistow to Strathalbyn). The town previously featured a now closed general store, which has been converted into a cafe. Further features of Wistow include a Post Office, community hall, church, and a cricket ground and associated club.

The Wistow Cricket Club, known as the Echidnas, have played on the Wistow cricket ground since 1896, and play in the Alexandra and Eastern Hills Cricket Association. The Echidnas have won five A grade premierships (1993/1994, 1999/2000, 2002/2003, 2004/2005, and 2007/2008).

The Wistow Community Association is an active community group that once ran the Wistow Country Market every 3rd Saturday (now discontinued), has frequent social events and publishes a regular newsletter. The Wistow Community Hall, owned by the Association, is leased out to a variety of sporting, social and environmental groups.

== History ==
Wistow was established by William Filder who, having been granted the land in 1853, sold 15 acres in 1859. Filder retained 2 acres following the sale, which he named Wistow. The town expanded significantly through the 1850s, and 1860s with the addition of a police station circa. 1850s, the Morning Star Inn in 1855, and a Post Office in 1867.

The police station that operated in Wistow was primarily created for the purposes of ensuring adequate supervision of rail work crews during the construction of the Victor Harbor Line to Mount Barker, and therefore closed when the Mount Barker extension opened in 1884.

The town features a South Australian Heritage listing for Eden House.

== Demographics ==
At the 2021 Census, Wistow had 285 residents, with 54.1% female and 45.9% male. The median age was 50. No residents identified as Aboriginal or Torres Strait Islander. Common ancestries included, English (42.8%), Australian (39.6%), German (10.5%), and Scottish (9.1%).

Most residents were born in Australia (69.5%). Religiously, "No Religion" was reported by 47%, followed by Catholic (11.16%), Pentecostal (10.5%), Anglican (10.2%), and Lutheran (9.5%).
