= Scott Creek Airport =

- IATA: none; ICAO: YSCC

Summary
- Operator: South Australian Country Fire Service
- Time zone: Australian Central Standard Time (UTC+09:30)
  - Summer (DST): Australian Central Summer Time (UTC+10:30)
- Elevation AMSL: 338 m / 1,109 ft
- Coordinates: 35.0918°S 138.6614°E

Maps
- Interactive map of Scott Creek Airport

Runways
Direction	Length		Surface
Direction	m	ft	Surface
16/34	1,126.5	3,696	Grass

Scott Creek Airport (ICAO: YSCC) also known as Cherry Gardens Airstrip is an airstrip in the northeastern corner of the locality of Clarendon, South Australia in the Adelaide Hills. Scott Creek and Cherry Gardens are smaller villages closer to the airstrip than the larger town of Clarendon. It has one unsealed runway 1127 metres long.

It has no aircraft parking facilities, but is used for reloading fire bomber aircraft for the South Australian Country Fire Service. The main aircraft operating from this strip are Air Tractors. An aircraft can be loaded with 3000 litres of water and firefighting foam and returned to the air in four minutes.
