= Flaxley, South Australia =

Flaxley
- Town
- Coordinates: 35°08′14″S 138°49′21″E
- Country: Australia
- State: South Australia
- LGA: District Council of Mount Barker
- Location: 39 km (24 mi) from Adelaide; 11 km (6.8 mi) south of Hahndorf

Government
  - State electorate: Heysen
  - Federal division: Mayo

Population
  - Total: 177 (SAL 2021)
- Postcode: 5153
Localities around Flaxley
Echunga		Mount Barker
	Flaxley	Bugle Ranges
Meadows	Green Hills Range	Macclesfield

Flaxley is a small settlement in the Adelaide Hills located 39 km south-east of the centre of the city of Adelaide in South Australia. It is situated in-between the larger towns of Echunga, Macclesfield and Meadows.

It is based near the property "Battunga" meaning "rolling hills" in Aboriginal vocabulary. The property was purchased by English settler Robert Davenport in 1843. After Robert died in 1896, the property remained in the Davenport family until 1914 when it was purchased by Professor William Lowrie, agriculturalist and Principal of Roseworthy Agricultural College, South Australia. Professor Lowrie was able to carry out much important research at Battunga, including work on the use of super-phosphate on South Australian farms.

The first church in Flaxley was built on the property which also served as a school. A Methodist church (which is now Uniting) was built in 1874. From 1899 to 1943 it was also used as a school.

Although small, Flaxley is a historically important link in the regions history. It has a church, tennis club and a community hall. The name is taken from the village Flaxley in Gloucestershire. Flaxley is part of the Battunga Country region in the Southern Mount Lofty Ranges.
