= Ironbank, South Australia =

Ironbank
- Town
- Country: Australia
- State: South Australia
- Region: Adelaide Hills; Southern Adelaide
- LGAs: Adelaide Hills Council; City of Onkaparinga

Government
  - State electorate: Heysen
  - Federal division: Mayo

Population
  - Total: 537 (SAL 2021)
- Postcode: 5153.
- County: Adelaide
Localities around Ironbank
Crafers West	Upper Sturt	Stirling
Coromandel East	Ironbank	Heathfield
Cherry Gardens	Scott Creek	Scott Creek

Ironbank is a semi-rural suburb of Adelaide, South Australia. It is in the City of Onkaparinga and Adelaide Hills Council local government areas, approximately 21.9 km from the Adelaide city centre.

== Services ==
In Ironbank, there is the Faith Community Meeting Hall, the local Ironbank Country Fire Service, a campsite and was well known for the used caryard on the outskirts, which was closed in 2020. Ironbank also has an Australian rules football club (the Ironbank Cherry Gardens Thunderers), a tennis club and netball club. The El-Carim Campsite is home to the Adelaide (Latvian) 14th Scout Group.
