= Macclesfield, South Australia =

Macclesfield
- Town
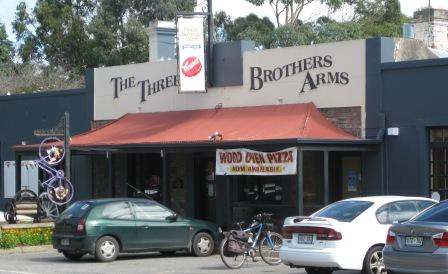
- The Three Brothers Arms

- Coordinates: 35°10′0″S 138°50′0″E
- Country: Australia
- State: South Australia
- Region: Adelaide Hills; Fleurieu and Kangaroo Island
- LGAs: District Council of Mount Barker; Alexandrina Council
- Established: 1840

Government
  - State electorate: Heysen
  - Federal division: Division of Mayo
- Elevation: 272 m (892 ft)

Population
  - Total: 977 (UCL 2021)
- Postcode: 5153
Localities around Macclesfield
Green Hills Range	Flaxley	Bugle Ranges
Meadows	Macclesfield	Gemmells
Paris Creek	Strathalbyn

Macclesfield is a small town on the upper reaches of the River Angas in the Adelaide Hills region of South Australia. In the 2020 census, Macclesfield had a population of 1,413 people.

Macclesfield is in the District Council of Mount Barker local government area's South Ward. The town is also in the state electorate of Heysen and the federal Division of Mayo.

== History ==
George Davenport was an English banker who was a director of the South Australian Company in England and together with partners Frederick Luck (quarter share) and Roger Cunliffe (1/8 share) paid £4416 for a special survey of 4416 acres (1619 ha) in South Australia. He sent his eldest son (George) Francis to select the land, arriving in Adelaide in February 1840. After initially considering land near Port Lincoln, Francis selected land on the upper reaches of the River Angas, including what is now the town of Macclesfield. This was the last of the special surveys in the area. The town of Macclesfield was named after the Earl of Macclesfield, to whom George Davenport was a steward in England. Francis Davenport returned to England in 1841, leaving Henry Giles to manage his affairs.

Francis Davenport and his wife Sarah returned in February 1843 along with Samuel Davenport, his wife Margaret (married 1 June 1842) and their other brother Robert Davenport. Francis died on 8 April 1843 (probably of typhus); later Samuel and Margaret moved to Beaumont and Robert lived at Battunga near Macclesfield and managed the survey.

The first hotel, The Goat's Head Inn, was established in 1841. It was later known as the Macclesfield Arms, Davenport Arms, and now Three Brothers' Arms after the three Davenport brothers. The brewery next door to the hotel was opened by 1851, but converted to a butter and cheese factory around 1903 and abandoned in favour of a new factory in 1937.

Macclesfield has been served by a primary school since 1876. In 2010, the Macclesfield Primary School celebrated 150 years of education in the town and surrounding districts. The ceremony was attended by many, including Alexander Downer MP, who lived in Macclesfield in the 1980s with his wife and children. The town is also home to the Macclesfield Football Club and Macclesfield Cricket Club.

== Infrastructure ==
Macclesfield is 14 km south of Mount Barker in the Adelaide Hills. On Sunday 13 October 2013 the community held an opening event for Crystal Lake Park to celebrate the return of community access to the park and the unveiling of the Yoshin Ogata sculpture. Crystal Lake Park, site of the historic swimming pool, is now a community multipurpose arts and recreation park and part of the Hills Sculpture Trail.

Macclesfield is serviced by a volunteer Country Fire Service who assisted in warding off the Ash Wednesday Bushfires in February 1983.

St James the Less Church is part of the Mount Barker - Strathalbyn Catholic Parish.
