= Gemmells, South Australia =

Gemmells
- Town
- Coordinates: 35.1826°S 138.8972°E
- Country: Australia
- State: South Australia
- Region: Fleurieu and Kangaroo Island
- LGA: Alexandrina Council
- Location: 55.5 km (34.5 mi) SSE of Adelaide; 15.7 km (9.8 mi) S of Mount Barker; 6.2 km (3.9 mi) ESE of Macclesfield

Government
  - State electorate: Electoral district of Heysen
  - Federal division: Division of Mayo

Population
  - Total: 99 (SAL 2021)
- Postcode: 5255
Localities around Gemmells
Bugle Ranges	Bugle Ranges	Highland Valley
Macclesfield	Gemmells	Highland Valley
Strathalbyn	Strathalbyn	Strathalbyn

Gemmells is a locality in the Adelaide Hills of South Australia. It lies between Mount Barker and Strathalbyn, both by road and on the Victor Harbor railway line.

Gemmells was named for Thomas Gemmell, an early farmer and pastoralist in the area.
