= Kyeema, South Australia =

Kyeema
- Suburb
- Coordinates: 35°16′40″S 138°40′18″E
- Country: Australia
- State: South Australia
- Region: Fleurieu and Kangaroo Island
- LGA: Alexandrina Council
- Location: 39 km (24 mi) S of Adelaide; 27 km (17 mi) NW of Goolwa
- Established: 31 August 2000

Government
  - State electorate: Heysen
  - Federal division: Mayo

Population
  - Total: 31 (shared with part of Blackfellows Creek (2016 census)
- Time zone: UTC+9:30 (ACST)
  - Summer (DST): UTC+10:30 (ACST)
- Postcode: 5172
- County: Adelaide
- Mean max temp: 19.2 °C (66.6 °F)
- Mean min temp: 10.3 °C (50.5 °F)
- Annual rainfall: 715.9 mm (28.19 in)
Suburbs around Kyeema
Kuitpo	Kuitpo; Blackfellows Creek	Blackfellows Creek
Kuitpo; Hope Forest; Yundi	Kyeema	Blackfellows Creek; Kuitpo Colony; Mount Magnificent
Yundi	Mount Magnificent; Yundi	Mount Magnificent
- Location; Adjoining localities

Kyeema is a locality in the Australian state of South Australia located about 39 kilometres (24 mi) south of the state capital of Adelaide and about and 27 kilometres (17 mi) north-west of the municipal seat of Goolwa.

Boundaries for the locality were created on 31 August 2000 for the “long established name” which is derived from the former Kyeema Prison Camp (also known as the Kyeema Camp) whose site is in the north of the locality within the boundaries of the Kyeema Conservation Park.

The 2016 Australian census which was conducted in August 2016 reports that Kyeema shared a population of 31 people with the western side of the adjoining locality of Blackfellows Creek.

Land use within the locality is restricted to a range of low-impact agricultural activities by the regulatory requirement not to “adversely affect the quality or quantity of water resources” due to the locality’s location within the Mount Lofty Ranges Watershed. Permitted uses include “commercial forestry, grazing, low intensity farming activity, small scale winery, cellar door sales, small scale restaurant associated with a winery or cellar door sales” and “on-farm rural produce sales.”

Kyeema is located within the federal division of Mayo, the state electoral district of Heysen, and the local government area of the Alexandrina Council.
