= Kuitpo Forest =

Forest plantation in the Mount Lofty Ranges, South Australia

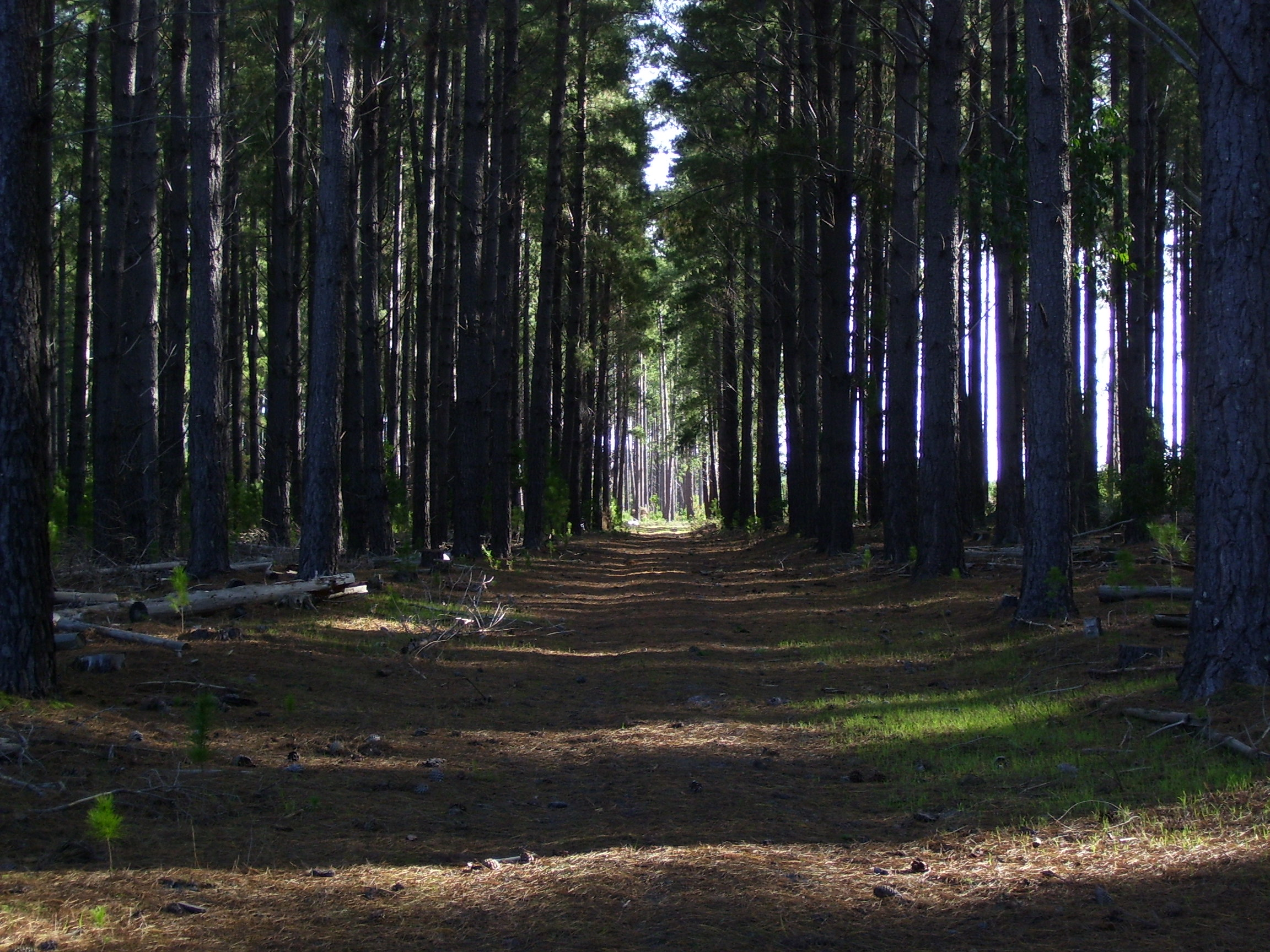
- Kuitpo Forest

- Location within South Australia

Geography
- Location: Alexandrina Council, South Australia, Australia
- Coordinates: 35°13′4.65″S 138°42′1.18″E
- Area: 3,600 hectares (8,900 acres)

Administration
- Established: 1898
- Authority: ForestrySA

Ecology
- Dominant tree species: Pinus radiata

Kuitpo Forest (/ˈkaɪpoʊ/ KY-poh) is a plantation forest in South Australia located about 40 kilometres (25 miles) south-east of the Adelaide city centre.

Kuipto, the first of many forest plantations in the Mount Lofty Ranges, was established in 1898 to ensure a sustainable timber supply for South Australia. The forest of radiata pine (Pinus radiata), serves as both a community forest and a commercial venture. Kuitpo is one of the more popular plantation forests; it is regularly frequented by locals and tourists alike, as an escape to nature. It is equipped with many walking trails, and a ForestrySA interpretive centre provides insight into both the forest ecology and the history of Kuitpo. The Heysen Trail runs through the forest, popular for any South Australian hiker, as well as being popular for bike rides, camping, picnics and also a great place to go horse riding or foraging for mushrooms.

The Kuitpo Forest Reserve covers an area of about 36 square kilometres (14 square miles), the majority of which is softwood plantation. Attempts at growing native timbers were largely abandoned as they proved too slow-growing. Instead, the tree of choice became radiata pine, a California native, although many other timbers are still grown. Native forest is found in small areas within the designated forest but also in nearby conservation parks, such as Mount Magnificent Conservation Park and Kyeema Conservation Park. Most of the remaining surrounding area is farm land, mainly for cattle.

Travel to the area from Adelaide is relatively fast and easy. A tourist route begins at a turnoff from South Road at O'Halloran Hill, onto Chandlers Hill Road. From here signs direct the visitor through Clarendon to Meadows. The area is also approachable from the south through Willunga.

== Climate ==
Kuitpo Forest has a hot summer Mediterranean climate (Köppen climate classification: Csa).

Climate data for Kuitpo Forest Reserve (365m ASL)
Month	Jan	Feb	Mar	Apr	May	Jun	Jul	Aug	Sep	Oct	Nov	Dec	Year
Record high °C (°F)	42.7 (108.9)	41.3 (106.3)	37.4 (99.3)	34.2 (93.6)	27.9 (82.2)	23.8 (74.8)	20.1 (68.2)	26.1 (79.0)	29.7 (85.5)	34.8 (94.6)	39.3 (102.7)	39.3 (102.7)	42.7 (108.9)
Mean daily maximum °C (°F)	26.1 (79.0)	25.8 (78.4)	23.2 (73.8)	19.6 (67.3)	16.0 (60.8)	13.1 (55.6)	12.3 (54.1)	13.6 (56.5)	16.2 (61.2)	18.8 (65.8)	22.0 (71.6)	23.9 (75.0)	19.2 (66.6)
Daily mean °C (°F)	20.2 (68.4)	20.0 (68.0)	18.0 (64.4)	15.4 (59.7)	12.7 (54.9)	10.3 (50.5)	9.5 (49.1)	10.3 (50.5)	12.2 (54.0)	14.0 (57.2)	16.6 (61.9)	18.3 (64.9)	14.8 (58.6)
Mean daily minimum °C (°F)	14.2 (57.6)	14.2 (57.6)	12.8 (55.0)	11.2 (52.2)	9.4 (48.9)	7.4 (45.3)	6.7 (44.1)	6.9 (44.4)	8.1 (46.6)	9.2 (48.6)	11.2 (52.2)	12.6 (54.7)	10.3 (50.5)
Record low °C (°F)	8.0 (46.4)	7.0 (44.6)	6.9 (44.4)	4.3 (39.7)	2.0 (35.6)	1.7 (35.1)	0.6 (33.1)	1.3 (34.3)	2.0 (35.6)	2.7 (36.9)	4.0 (39.2)	6.0 (42.8)	0.6 (33.1)
Average rainfall mm (inches)	27.6 (1.09)	24.4 (0.96)	36.5 (1.44)	58.6 (2.31)	84.8 (3.34)	104.8 (4.13)	114.8 (4.52)	89.0 (3.50)	78.1 (3.07)	51.9 (2.04)	34.8 (1.37)	35.7 (1.41)	715.9 (28.19)
Average rainy days	6.6	7.0	10.2	13.0	17.1	19.6	21.0	19.3	17.1	14.1	10.3	9.9	165.2
Average relative humidity (%) (at 3pm)	43	46	49	55	66	72	71	65	62	57	50	48	57

Climate data for Kuitpo Forest HQ (300m ASL)
Month	Jan	Feb	Mar	Apr	May	Jun	Jul	Aug	Sep	Oct	Nov	Dec	Year
Record high °C (°F)	41.8 (107.2)	42.6 (108.7)	40.2 (104.4)	35.2 (95.4)	26.0 (78.8)	21.3 (70.3)	19.6 (67.3)	24.1 (75.4)	30.4 (86.7)	35.4 (95.7)	39.4 (102.9)	40.3 (104.5)	42.6 (108.7)
Mean daily maximum °C (°F)	25.6 (78.1)	26.6 (79.9)	23.9 (75.0)	20.3 (68.5)	16.3 (61.3)	13.3 (55.9)	12.5 (54.5)	13.7 (56.7)	16.2 (61.2)	19.2 (66.6)	22.0 (71.6)	24.6 (76.3)	19.5 (67.1)
Daily mean °C (°F)	18.8 (65.8)	19.4 (66.9)	17.4 (63.3)	14.3 (57.7)	11.4 (52.5)	9.1 (48.4)	8.3 (46.9)	9.2 (48.6)	11.0 (51.8)	13.2 (55.8)	15.5 (59.9)	17.8 (64.0)	13.8 (56.8)
Mean daily minimum °C (°F)	12.0 (53.6)	12.1 (53.8)	10.8 (51.4)	8.2 (46.8)	6.4 (43.5)	4.8 (40.6)	4.1 (39.4)	4.7 (40.5)	5.8 (42.4)	7.1 (44.8)	8.9 (48.0)	10.9 (51.6)	8.0 (46.4)
Record low °C (°F)	2.0 (35.6)	4.2 (39.6)	2.0 (35.6)	0.0 (32.0)	−2.0 (28.4)	−4.2 (24.4)	−3.9 (25.0)	−2.6 (27.3)	−1.5 (29.3)	0.5 (32.9)	0.6 (33.1)	2.3 (36.1)	−4.2 (24.4)
Average rainfall mm (inches)	25.5 (1.00)	21.3 (0.84)	38.2 (1.50)	64.5 (2.54)	88.2 (3.47)	107.0 (4.21)	126.5 (4.98)	121.2 (4.77)	91.7 (3.61)	72.7 (2.86)	41.3 (1.63)	37.5 (1.48)	836.5 (32.93)
Average rainy days	6.3	5.0	8.3	11.6	14.5	16.2	18.0	18.6	15.6	12.6	9.4	8.0	144.1
