= Scott Creek Conservation Park =

Protected area in South Australia

- IUCN category III (natural monument or feature)
- Location within South Australia
- Location: South Australia
- Nearest city: Adelaide
- Coordinates: 35°05′S 138°41′E
- Area: 7.14 km^{2} (2.76 sq mi)
- Established: 7 November 1985
- Governing body: Department for Environment and Water
- Website: Official website

Scott Creek Conservation Park is a protected area in the Australian state of South Australia located in the gazetted locality of Dorset Vale about 20 kilometres (12 mi) south of the state capital of Adelaide.

== History ==
Formerly Peramangk Aboriginal territory, European settlers first arrived in the late 1830s with timber from the area used in the construction of the city of Adelaide. From the 1850s the area was mined for copper and silver with the Almanda Mining Association formed in 1868. By the time production ceased in 1887 (due to economic reasons), 310 kilograms of silver had been mined. The land was privately owned until the early 1970s when land was purchased by the South Australian Government, with the conservation park being declared in 1985.

== Facilities ==
The conservation park has an extensive network of walking trails which enables visitors to select walks appropriate to their level of fitness, specific interests and personal time frame. The Almanda Mine ruins can be explored via two half-hour interpretative trails starting from the car park on Dorset Vale Road. Sites of interest include remnants of the engine house, a stone chimney, the mine office, dairy and several mining shafts. There are no toilets.

== See also ==
- Protected areas of South Australia
- List of protected areas in Adelaide
