= Kyeema Conservation Park =

Protected area in South Australia

- IUCN category III (natural monument or feature)
- Location within South Australia
- Location: South Australia, Kyeema
- Nearest city: Willunga
- Coordinates: 35°15′59″S 138°40′54″E
- Area: 3.46 km^{2} (1.34 sq mi)
- Established: 12 November 1964
- Governing body: Department for Environment and Water
- Website: Official website

Kyeema Conservation Park (formerly the Kyeema National Park) is a protected area located in the Australian state of South Australia in the locality of Kyeema about 38 kilometres (24 mi) south of the state capital of Adelaide and about 12 kilometres (7.5 mi) east of the town of Willunga.

The conservation park consists of land in sections 92, 302, 522, 682, 683, 688 and 850 of the cadastral unit of the Hundred of Kuitpo, and which is an area bounded in the south by a sealed road, Woodgate Hill Road, by the locality's boundary with the locality of Kuitpo in the west and in part to the north, and in the east by an unsealed track, Blackfellows Creek Road. The Heysen Trail, the long distance walking trail, passes through the middle of the conservation park entering from the south via Woodgate Hill Road.

Its protected area status began on 12 November 1964 as a wildlife reserve proclaimed under the National Park and Wild Life Reserves Act 1891-1960 in respect to sections 92, 522, 688, and 850. On 3 August 1967, section 302 and all of the land in the wildlife reserve were proclaimed under the National Parks Act 1966 as the Kyeema National Park. On 27 April 1972, it was reconstituted as the Kyeema Conservation Park upon the proclamation of the National Parks and Wildlife Act 1972. On 4 April 1974, Sections 682 and 683 were added to the conservation park. As of 2016, it covered an area of 346 hectares (850 acres).

Prior uses of the land included use of section 522 both as a "labour prison reserve" and a camping ground. The labour prison reserve which was known initially as the Kyeema Afforestation Camp and then as the Kyeema Prison Camp was gazetted on 27 October 1932 and operated until 1959 when it was replaced by the Cadell Training Centre. The camping ground was operated by the National Fitness Council of South Australia from 1 September 1962 to 31 July 1964.

In 1980, the conservation park's listing on the now-defunct Register of the National Estate argued it to be significant for the following reasons:

A Park containing areas of very dense natural vegetation providing an excellent refuge for substantial populations of native fauna. Notable mammals include Isoodon obesulus (endangered in South Australia) and Rattus leutreolus (northern limit of South Australian range). Notable birds include the threatened scaly thrush and the uncommon beautiful firetail. Many uncommon plants are found within the Park, including the endangered Lomandra multiflora.

In 1980, the vegetation of conservation park was described as follows:

A dissected plateau which supports Eucalyptus obliqua | E. baxteri open forest, frequently associated with E. cosmophylla | E. fascilulosa. Areas of extremely thick vegetation occur along some drainage lines and in areas of E cosmophylla | E fasciculosa scrub open areas, some of which are still being grazed, provide valuable feeding habitat for Macropus fuliginosus. The Park supports good populations of the typical Mount Lofty faunal assemblages.

In February 1983, it was damaged by the Ash Wednesday bushfires and became the focus of “a revegetation project involving local school students”. In the first three years after commencement, “approximately 20,000 seedlings were planted” in an area now officially known as The Childrens Forest. The replanting project continues under the control of a volunteer group known as The Friends of Kyeema Conservation Park which was formed in 1985 and which celebrated thirty years of operation in 2015.

The conservation park is classified as an IUCN Category III protected area.

== See also ==
- Protected areas of South Australia
