= Echunga =

- Town
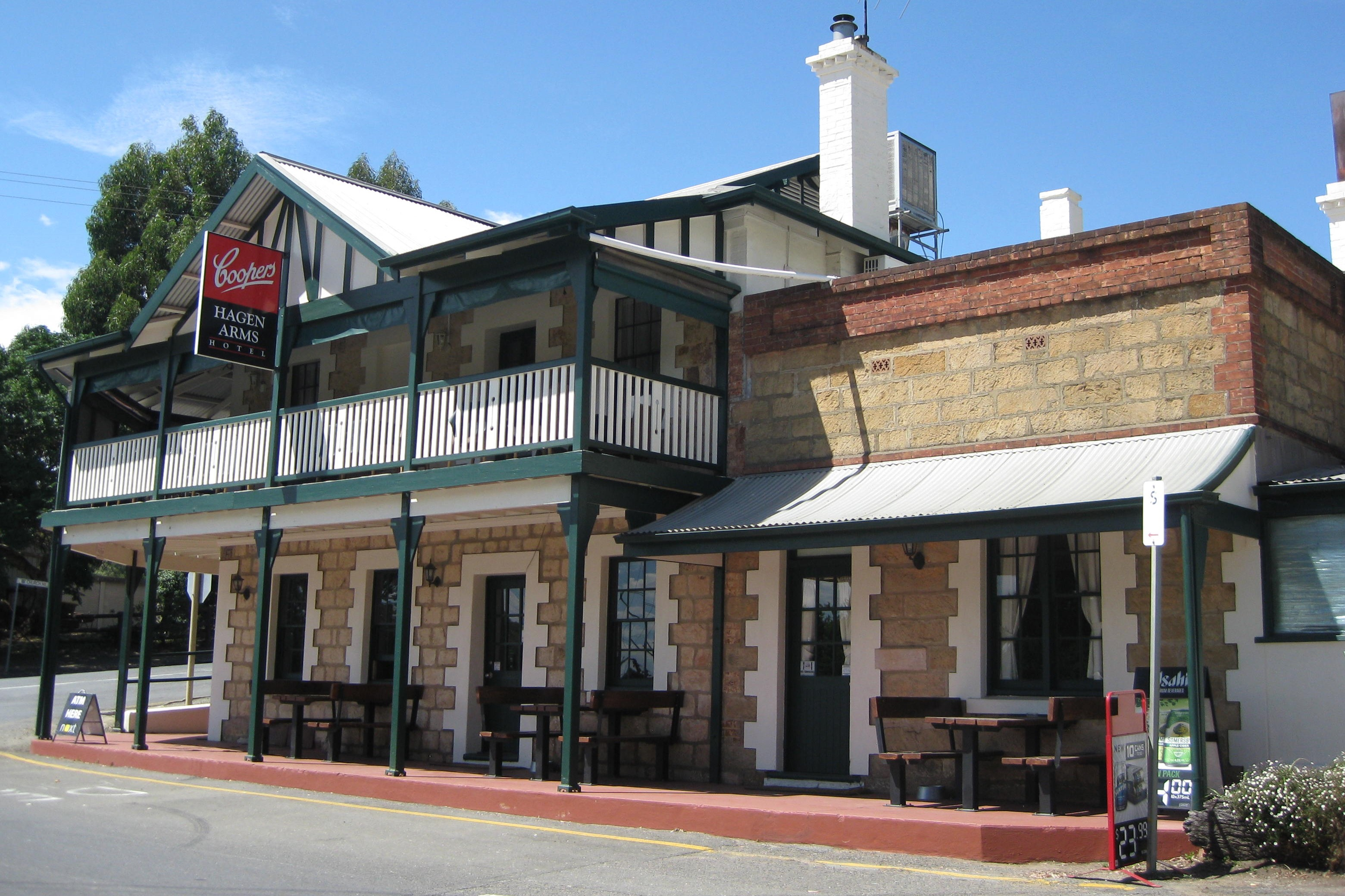
- Hagen Arms Hotel, located in the main street

- Coordinates: 35°06′0″S 138°47′0″E
- Country: Australia
- State: South Australia
- LGA: District Council of Mount Barker
- Location: 34 km (21 mi) from Adelaide; 8 km (5.0 mi) from Hahndorf
- Established: 1839

Government
  - State electorate: Electoral district of Heysen
  - Federal division: Mayo

Population
  - Total: 630 (UCL 2021)
- Postcode: 5153
Localities around Echunga
Chapel Hill, Biggs Flat	Hahndorf	Paechtown
Jupiter Creek	Echunga	Mount Barker
Meadows	Flaxley	Bugle Ranges

Echunga (/ɪˈtʃʌŋɡə/ ih-CHUNG-gə) is a small town in the Adelaide Hills located 34 kilometres (21 mi) south-east of Adelaide in South Australia.

The area was settled by Europeans during the period of British colonisation of South Australia in 1839, with the town laid out in 1849. The name of the town was derived from the Kaurna word Ityangga, meaning "over there" or "close by".

Gold was discovered in 1852 and Echunga became the first proclaimed goldfield in South Australia. This led to a gold rush; however, it did not last long, with the diggings exhausted and all but abandoned within a year. Subsequent discoveries in 1853 and 1854 led to smaller and equally short-lived rushes. In 1868 more gold was discovered at nearby Jupiter Creek, which proved to be a much larger and more long-lived field.

For a brief time Echunga prospered and it has been estimated that at its peak it had grown to a population in excess of 1,200. Echunga is part of Battunga Country.

Echunga frequently hosts stages of the Tour Down Under, with riders racing through the main street and up the steep climb of Church Hill Road.
