= The Range, South Australia =

The Range
- Suburb
- Country: Australia
- State: South Australia
- Region: Fleurieu and Kangaroo Island; Southern Adelaide
- City: Adelaide
- LGAs: Alexandrina Council; City of Onkaparinga
- Location: 50 km (31 mi) from Adelaide

Government
  - State electorate: Heysen
  - Federal division: Kingston and Mayo

Population
  - Total: 159 (SAL 2021)
- Postcode: 5172
- County: Adelaide
Suburbs around The Range
Kangarilla	Kangarilla	Kangarilla
McLaren Vale	The Range	Blackfellows Creek
Willunga	Pages Flat	Willunga South

The Range is a rural locality, south of Adelaide, South Australia. The Range Post Office opened on 1 June 1947 and closed in 1962.
