= Meadows, South Australia =

Meadows South Australia
- Coordinates: 35°11′0″S 138°45′0″E
- Population: 1,126 (UCL 2021)
- Established: Circa 1850
- Postcode(s): 5201
- LGA(s): Mount Barker
- State electorate(s): Heysen
- Federal division(s): Mayo
Localities around Meadows:
Kangarilla	Jupiter Creek	Echunga, Flaxley
Clarendon	Meadows	Green Hills Range, Macclesfield
Kuitpo, Prospect Hill	Bull Creek	Paris Creek

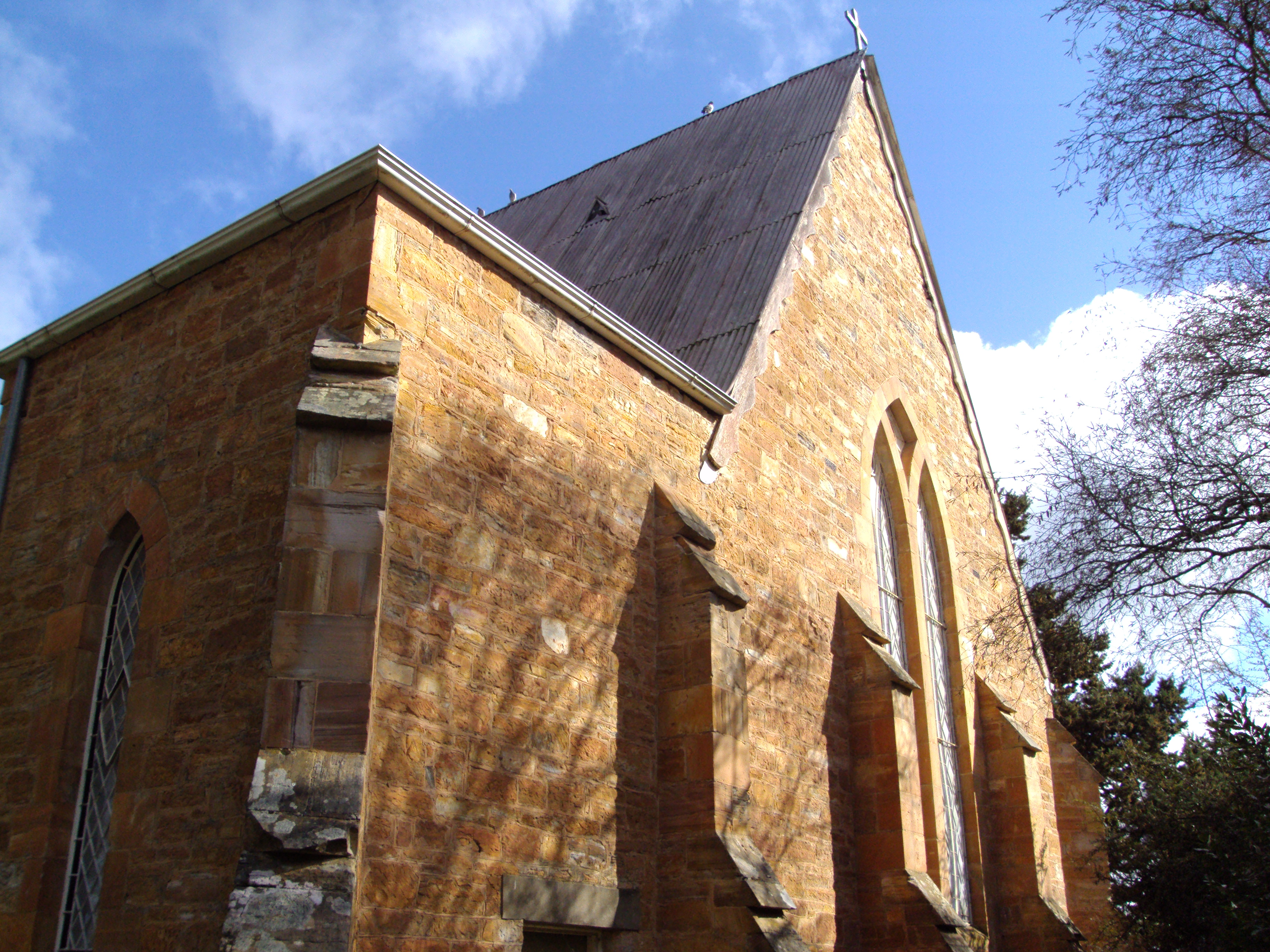
Meadows Anglican Church (1869)

Meadows is a town in the Adelaide Hills, South Australia, the town was originally known as Battunga, and the land including and around it is still referred to as Battunga country. At the 2021 Australian census, Meadows had a population of 1,126.

== History ==
Battunga, meaning "the place of big trees" was the original name of the location, ascribed to someone called Billjim in a 1933 newspaper article.

During the period of British colonisation of South Australia, Charles Flaxman, clerk of George Fife Angas in London, on 21 January 1839 acquired a special survey of this country for £4,000, with £2,320 paid in cash, and the balance in 21 land orders each for 80 acres (32 ha). In return for this outlay, Flaxman received 15,000 acres (6,100 ha) of the country he surveyed. The land incorporating Meadows was part of the survey undertaken by Flaxman on 31 January 1839.

Flaxman spoke fluent German, and, knowing that many German Lutheran emigrants were keen to move to the new colony, he settled a group of them on this land at the end of 1838. By 1842, there were many established settlers, and a mail service operated between the town and the city of Adelaide. Grain crops such as wheat, barley, and oats, were grown, as well as vegetables. A flour mill was established by Robert Burley, which was later converted into a sawmill.

In 1857 there was further subdivision of land, and by 1868 the township there was an inn, two stores, a blacksmith, a butcher, a tan yard, three shoemakers, a carpenter, the mill, and two churches: Primitive and Methodist. St Georges' Anglican Church in 1870 and a new school building opened in 1872 The post office was moved from a store to its present site in 1884.

The sawmill was in operation by 1870, with a plentiful supply of red gum trees available nearby. William Durward established the first commercial forest plantation in 1899, and in 1917 a small mill opened in Kuitpo forest.

A new school was established in 1910, and an Institute built in 1914.

In 1920 geologist and Antarctic explorer Sir Douglas Mawson founded South Australian Hardwoods Ltd, and setting up a timber mill next to Kuitpo Forest. He remained a director of the company for more than 30 years, and also owned and worked a 1,200-acre (490 ha) farm called "Harewood" near Meadows. The high street in Meadows is named Mawson Road in his honour.

The Kondoparinga Dairyman's Co-operative Association maded butter, and in 1935 a Farmers' Union cheese factory opened in the town. It was eventually found to be uneconomical and closed.

In 1939, much of the town was destroyed in bushfires.

== Description and demographics ==
The land around the town of Meadows is still known as "Battunga country", or the Battunga region. It also includes the towns of Macclesfield, Echunga, Flaxley, Prospect Hill, Paris Creek, Kuitpo, and Jupiter Creek. Meadows is the largest of the Battunga towns.

At the 2021 Australian census, Meadows had a population of 1,126.

== Attractions ==
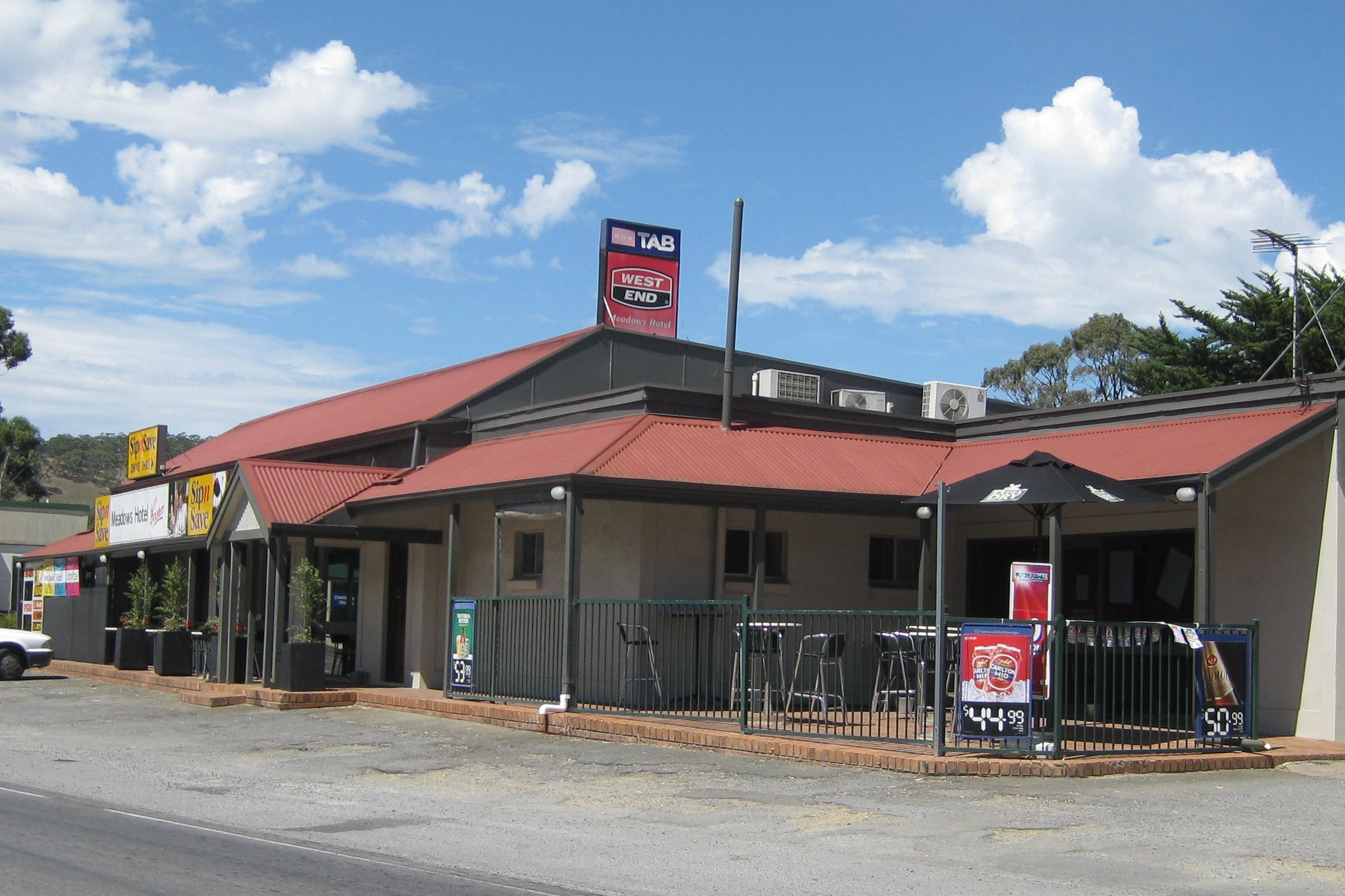
Meadows Hotel, 2016

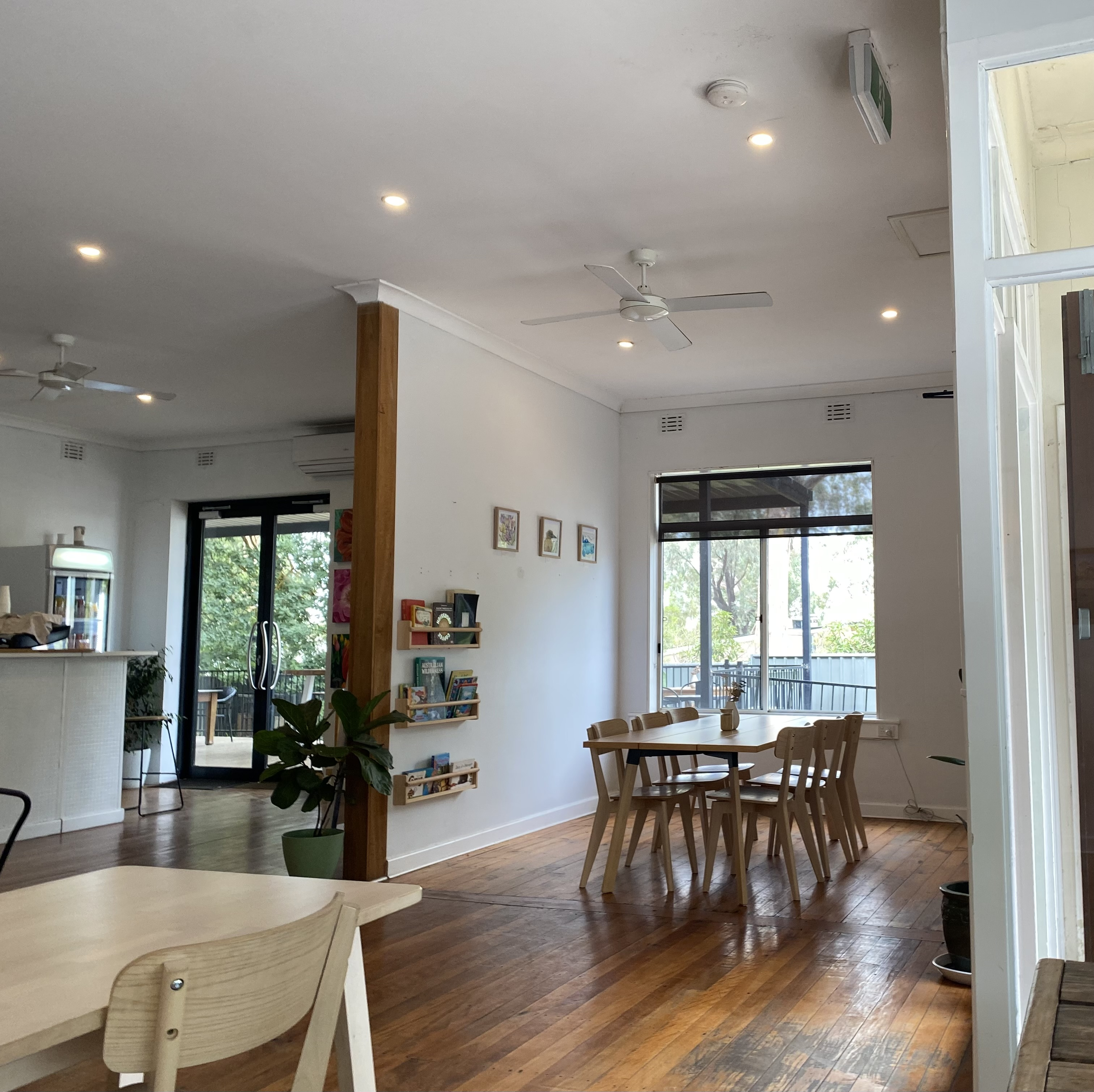
Mawson Cafe interior, 2025

Meadows has antique shops, a hotel, and bakeries. Mawson Café is on the main street, Mawson Road.

The annual four-day Meadows Easter Fair has been running since 1997.

Every year on the third Sunday in October, the town hosts the Meadows Country Fair, which includes a milking competition known as the "Udder tug". Established in 1983 by the Meadows Sporting Recreation & Social Club, the fair continues to attract thousands of visitors each year.

There is a sporting and recreation ground, which includes a two-storey sporting complex with change rooms and other facilities.

The 5,000-hectare (12,000-acre) Kuitpo Forest, known for bushwalking, cycling, and horse riding, is close to Meadows.

The nearby Prospect Hill Museum tells the story of the regional dairy industry and includes a re-created milk room.

== Transport ==
Meadows is fairly close to Mount Barker and Hahndorf.

It is serviced three times a day, once in the morning and twice in the afternoon by Adelaide Metro Route 850 to Aldgate, which connects to a city service T863.

On Tuesdays only, Meadows is also by serviced by two Southlink country services to Mt Barker. The 856 comes once in the morning and the 857 comes back in the afternoon once.
