= Kangarilla, South Australia =

Kangarilla
- Town
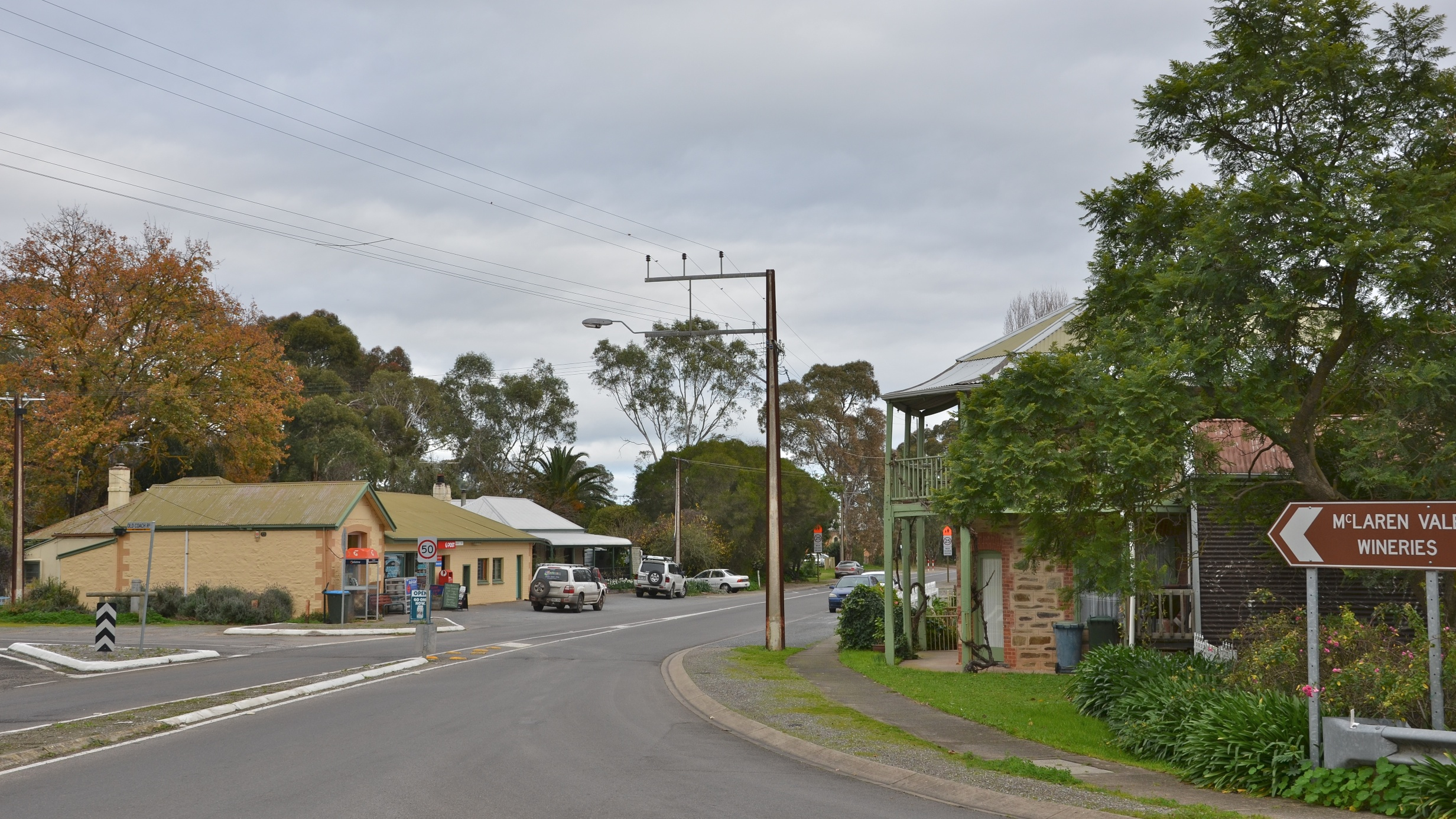
- Main street of Kangarilla

- Coordinates: 35.148°S 138.660°E
- Country: Australia
- State: South Australia
- Region: Southern Adelaide
- LGA: City of Onkaparinga
- Location: 41 km (25 mi) from Adelaide

Government
  - Federal division: Division of Mayo
- Elevation: 195 m (640 ft)

Population
  - Total: 905 (SAL 2021)
- Postcode: 5157
- County: Adelaide
Localities around Kangarilla
| Clarendon | Clarendon | Mylor |
| McLaren Vale and McLaren Flat | Kangarilla | Jupiter Creek |
| The Range | Blackfellows Creek | Meadows |

Kangarilla is a small rural town and locality around 33 km (21 mi) from Adelaide city centre, in South Australia. The area, formerly inhabited by Kaurna people, was settled by Europeans in 1840, not long after the British colonisation of South Australia. Today it lies within the City of Onkaparinga local government area, and has postcode 5157. At the 2016 census, Kangarilla had a population of 896.

== History ==
The land on which Kangarilla was settled by Europeans was formerly inhabited by the Kaurna people, who called it Kangkarrilla. Manning's Index reports that Norman Tindale thought that kanggarila may mean "birthplace", and that it was spelt "Kungirilla" in The South Australian on 17 March 1843. Ngarrindjeri man David Unaipon was recorded as saying that Kang means "two" and Ra'mulia means "outflow or water flowing", referring to two waterholes, but more recent sources have variously reported that the meaning in the Kaurna language is "a place where something is nurtured", and possibly "a place with abundant resources", "place of rest with water and trees", and "shepherding place".

The land around Kangarilla was first settled in around 1840, with wheat and vineyards the main produce. A town was founded in 1849 by John Bottrill, and properly surveyed in 1860 on section 875 in the Hundred of Kuitpo, named Scaldwell. It was later called Eyre Flat or Eyre's Flat, and the name Kangarilla may have originally been the name given to the creek which ran through the area. The name Eyre's Flat stopped being used in the 1870s, when the area started to be referred to as Kangarilla.

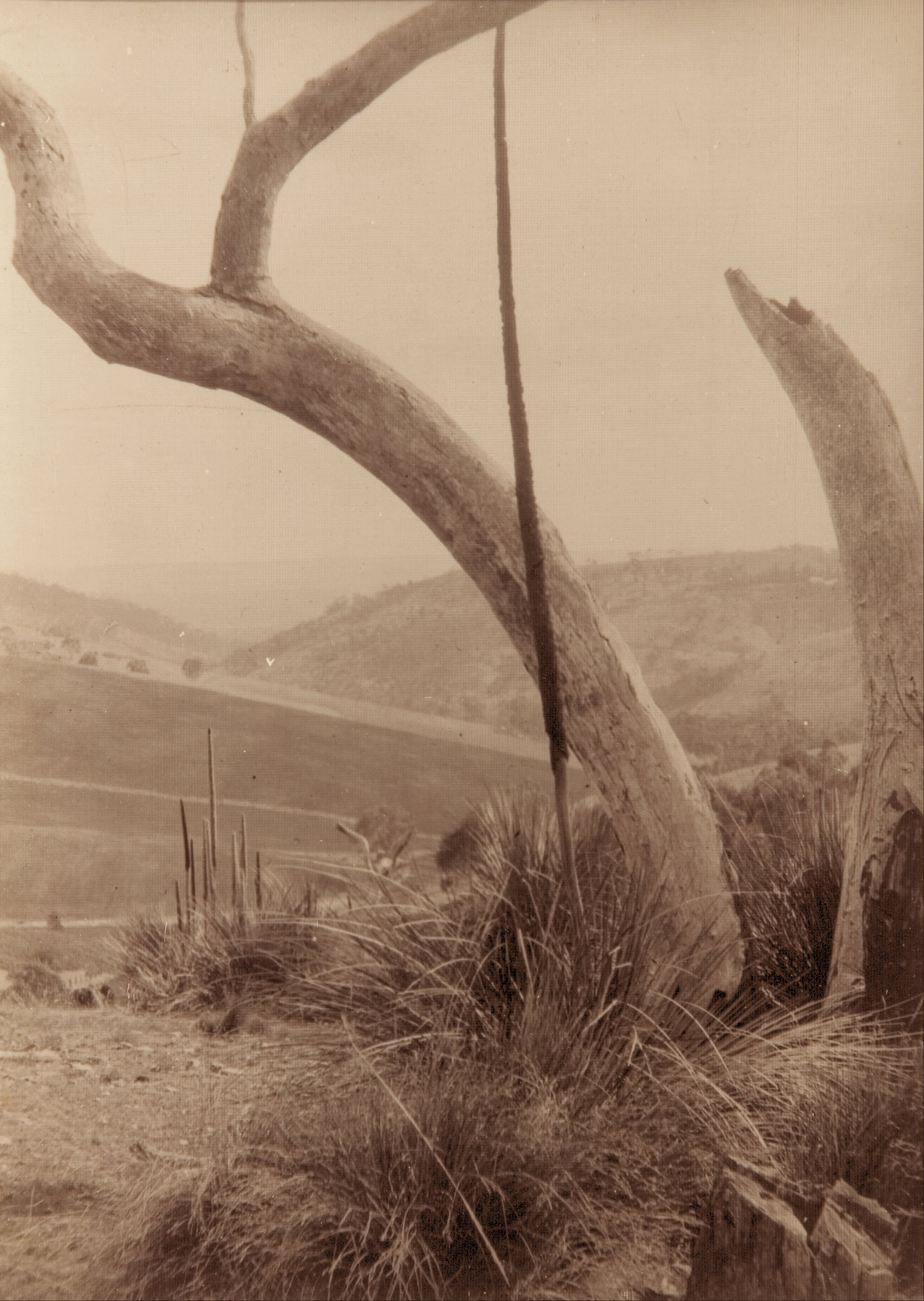
Dashwood Gully circa 1920

The historic settlement of Dashwood Gully (also known as Dashwoods Gully) existed within the present-day bounded locality of Kangarilla. It was named for George Frederick Dashwood, who settled there in 1841 and was appointed as a member of the South Australian parliament in 1843. The first Dashwood's Gully post office opened in November 1863 and closed in 1867; a second post office opened from December 1871 to December 1930.

== Governance ==
Kangarilla lay within the District Council of Willunga from 1853 until December 1997, when it became part of the newly created City of Onkaparinga.

== Description and Demographics ==
Kangarilla lies around 33 km (21 mi) from Adelaide city centre, close to the Adelaide Hills and at the northern end of the Fleurieu Peninsula. It is regarded as a township in the Australian sense (a small town), although technically also a suburb or locality. It is physically separated from nearby townships by areas of agriculture and viticulture, notably the McLaren Vale area, about a 15-minute drive away.

At the 2016 census, Kangarilla had a population of 896.

== See also ==
- History of Adelaide
- European settlement of South Australia
