= Mount Lofty railway station =

Former railway station in South Australia, Australia

Coordinates: 35°00′28″S 138°42′34″E

Mount Lofty
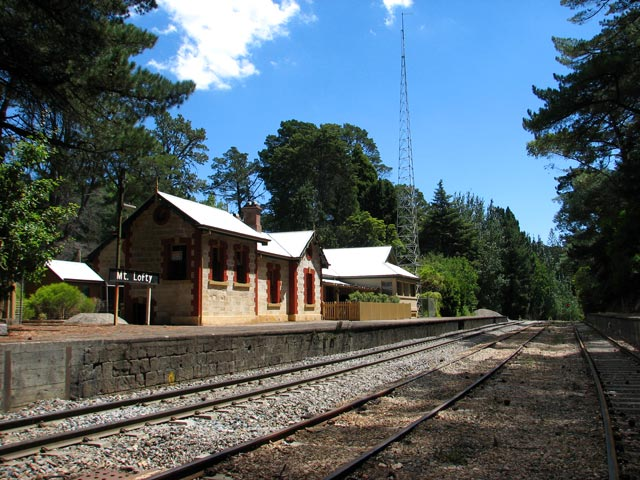

General information
- Location: Sturt Valley Road; Stirling
- Elevation: 492m
- Line: Adelaide-Wolseley line
- Distance: 31.40 km from Adelaide
- Platforms: 2
- Bus routes: None

Construction
- Parking: No
- Cycle facilities: No

History
- Opened: 1883
- Closed: 23 September 1987

Services
Preceding station	TransAdelaide	Following station
Upper Sturt towards Adelaide	Bridgewater line	Heathfield towards Bridgewater
Location

Mount Lofty Railway Station is located on the Adelaide-Wolseley line and served the Adelaide Hills suburb of Stirling. It is located 19 1/4 miles (31.0 km) from Adelaide station.

== History ==
The station opened in 1883 and was the highest railway station between Adelaide and Melbourne, at an elevation of 492 m. Two platforms were provided. The eastbound platform was 125 metres long and the westbound platform, 104 metres long. Both platforms are still in place, although no longer in use. The station signs on both platforms, which were mainly used at stations in the hills and near the beach (e.g. Belair and Semaphore respectively) from early in the 1900s to the 1980s, are also still in place.

The station closed on 23 September 1987, when the State Transport Authority withdrew Bridgewater line services between Belair and Bridgewater. The small traditional wooden shelter which once graced the eastbound platform no longer exists. Neither does the signal box which once stood high next to the bridge on the south platform. This was demolished when main building was extended to include a new signal box in 1929. The wooden stairs leading down from the footbridge to the south platform were removed in 2014 when the footbridge was refurbished.

In 1995, the line from Adelaide to Melbourne was converted from Broad Gauge (1600mm) to Standard Gauge (1435mm), thus preventing any restoration of local trains to Mount Lofty and beyond, as the Adelaide suburban system remained as broad gauge. At the station there are three standard gauge railway tracks, two for interstate freight, and the third is used to stable track machines. The southern track is the main line and the northern track is the crossing loop. As the length of the crossing loop is only 629 metres, the crossing of trains at Mount Lofty is rare.

Mount Lofty station was used for holiday and tourist accommodation with a comfortable and quaint railway theme from 2000 to 2018. From a derelict state, the station building was rebuilt in the mid 1990s in a project managed by Stirling Council using Federal Government retraining funding. In 1999-2000, the Emmett family of Stirling completed the rebuild to suit its current use as accommodation, and operated it until 2018 on lease from the South Australian Government. Trains, including interstate freight trains and the interstate passenger express "The Overland", pass through the station each day, but the platforms are only used for special trains or in emergencies.

In 2016 Railcams were installed by Railpage Australia designed to digitally record all freight and passenger trains through the location. As at 16 April 2017 over 11,000 images had been recorded and made available online, and an example can be found in the Mount Lofty Railway Station - Photo Thread
