= Madurta railway station =

Former railway station in South Australia, Australia

Madurta
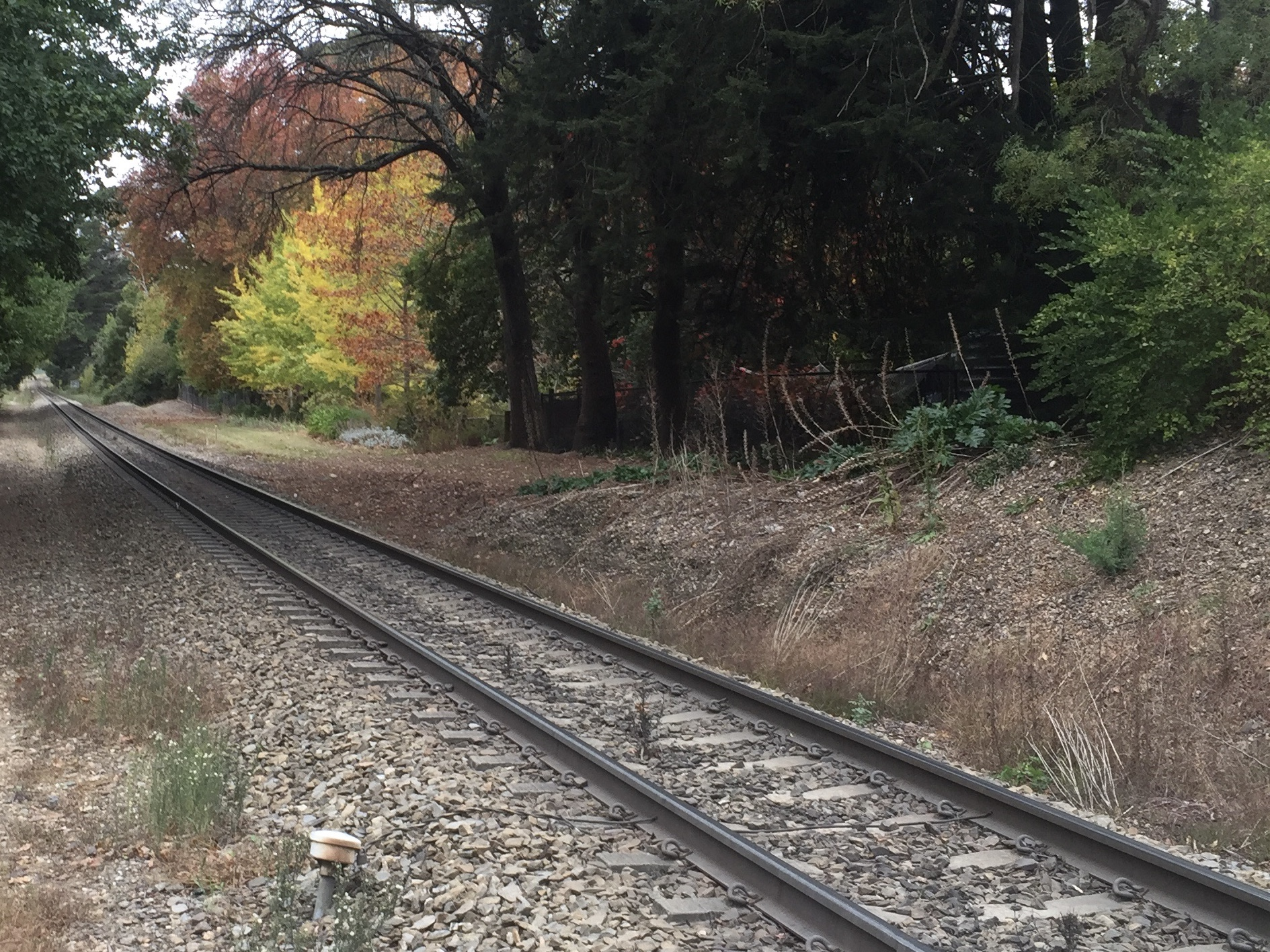
- The site of the now demolished Madurta station, April 2021

General information
- Location: Cricklewood Road, Aldgate
- Coordinates: 35.0167°S 138.726°E
- Operator: State Transport Authority
- Line: Adelaide-Wolseley
- Distance: 34.16 kilometres from Adelaide
- Platforms: 1
- Tracks: 1

Construction
- Structure type: Ground

Other information
- Status: Closed

History
- Closed: 23 September 1987

Services
Preceding station	TransAdelaide	Following station
Heathfield towards Adelaide	Bridgewater line	Aldgate towards Bridgewater
Location

Madurta railway station was located on the Adelaide-Wolseley line serving the Adelaide Hills suburb of Aldgate to the east of the Cricklewood Road level crossing. It was located 34.1 km from Adelaide station.

== History ==
It is unclear when the station was opened. It consisted of one 67-metre (220 ft) platform with a waiting shelter. The shelter shed was not located on the platform, instead being located between the platform and the level crossing.

The station closed on 23 September 1987 when the State Transport Authority withdrew Bridgewater line services between Belair and Bridgewater. Both the platform and shelter shed were removed around 1994 when the line had gauge-convertible concrete sleepers installed in readiness for conversion from broad to standard gauge the following year.
