= Heathfield railway station, Adelaide =

Former railway station in South Australia, Australia

Heathfield
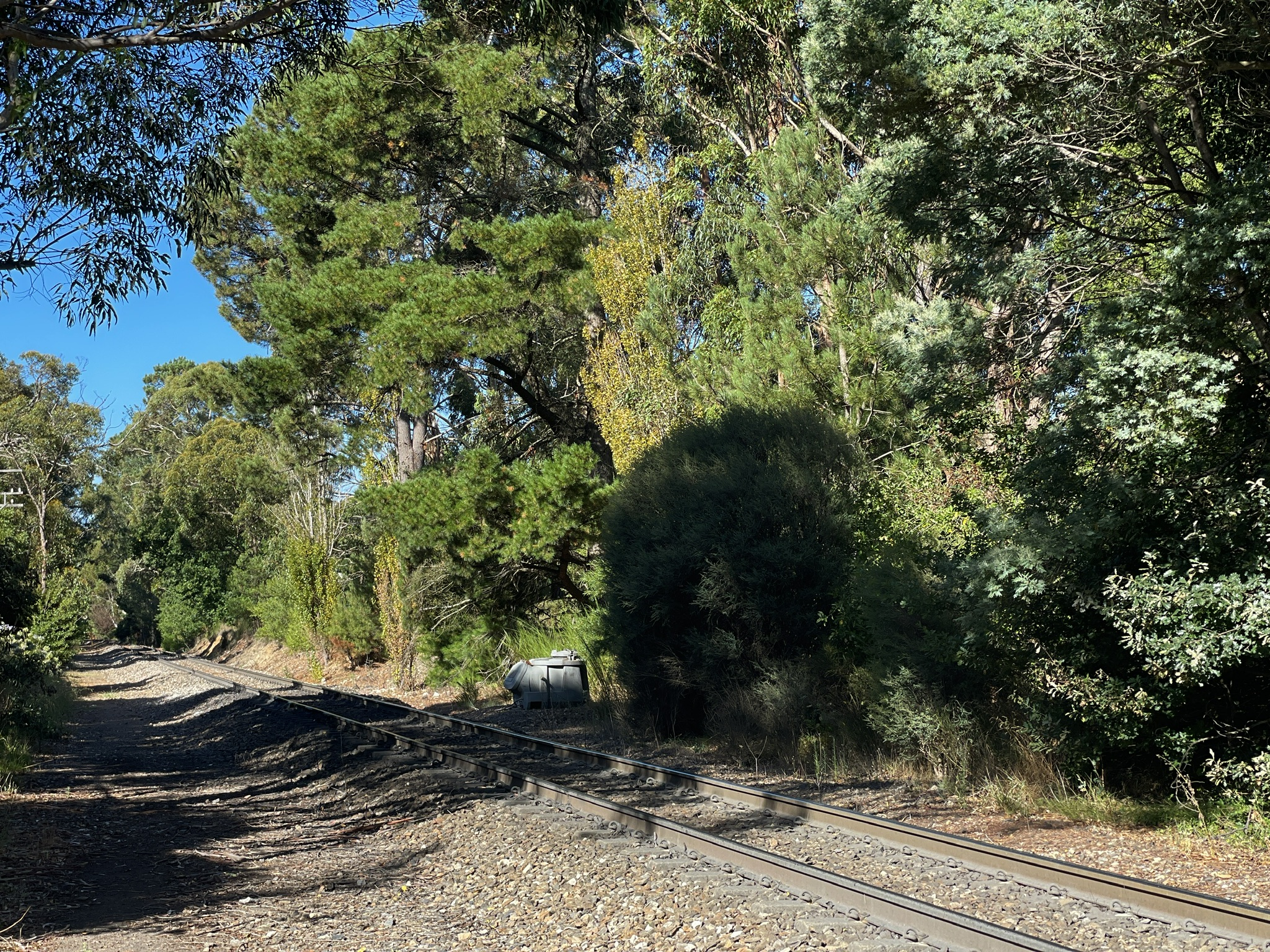
- The site of the now-demolished Heathfield station, March 2022

General information
- Location: Bogaduck Road, Heathfield
- Coordinates: 35.0206°S 138.7190°E
- Operator: State Transport Authority
- Line: Adelaide-Wolseley
- Distance: 33.25 kilometres from Adelaide
- Platforms: 1
- Tracks: 1

Construction
- Structure type: Ground

Other information
- Status: Closed and demolished

History
- Closed: 23 September 1987

Services
Preceding station	TransAdelaide	Following station
Mount Lofty towards Adelaide	Bridgewater line	Madurta towards Bridgewater
Location

Heathfield railway station was located on the Adelaide-Wolseley line serving the Adelaide Hills suburb of Heathfield. It was located 33.2 km from Adelaide station, and at an elevation of 420 metres (1,380 ft).

== History ==
It is unclear when the station was opened. It consisted of one 85-metre-long platform and a waiting shelter. The station was located opposite Bogaduck Road next to the present-day pedestrian crossing.

The station closed on 23 September 1987, when the State Transport Authority withdrew Bridgewater line services between Belair and Bridgewater. It has since been demolished.
