= Upper Sturt railway station =

Former railway station in South Australia, Australia

Upper Sturt
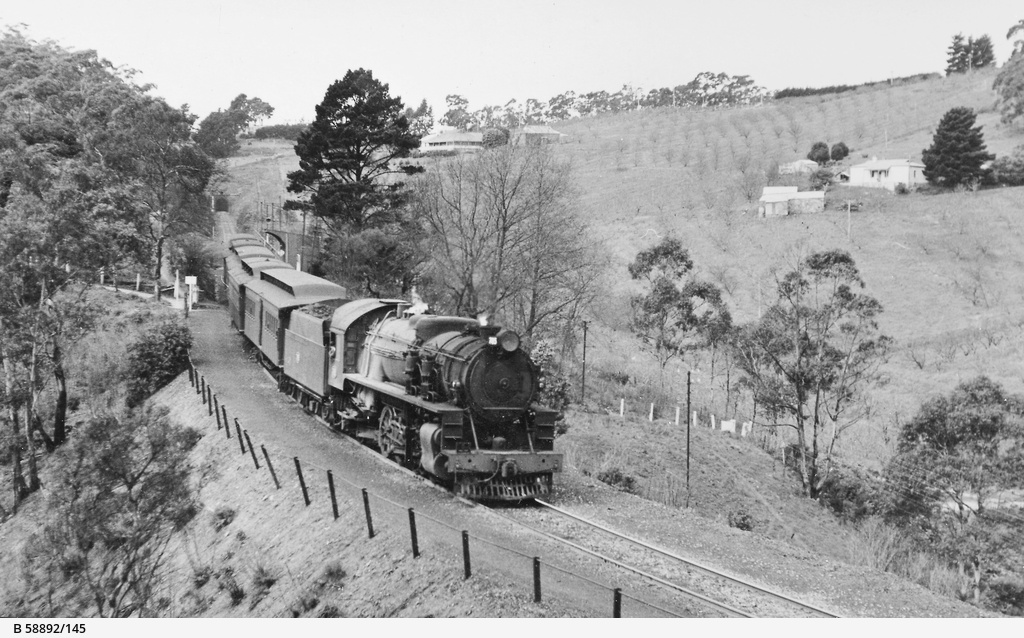
- Pinnaroo Express leaving Upper Sturt railway station in 1952. Tunnel number 8 is visible in the distance.

General information
- Location: Station Road, Upper Sturt
- Coordinates: 35.01317°S 138.69082°E
- Operator: State Transport Authority
- Line: Adelaide-Wolseley
- Distance: 29.31 kilometres from Adelaide
- Platforms: 1
- Tracks: 1

Construction
- Structure type: Ground

Other information
- Status: Closed

History
- Closed: 23 September 1987

Services
Preceding station	TransAdelaide	Following station
Nalawort towards Adelaide	Bridgewater line	Mount Lofty towards Bridgewater
Location

Upper Sturt railway station was located on the Adelaide-Wolseley line serving the Adelaide Hills suburb of Upper Sturt. It was located 29.3 km from Adelaide station.

== History ==
Opened prior to 17 April 1885, the station consisted of one 81 metre platform with a waiting shelter. Prior to 1956 the station was quite substantial, with an enclosed waiting room and ticket office. There was a relatively short section of masonry platform (approx 20 m) and a long wooden section. In the Black Sunday bushfires of 1955 all but the masonry section of the platform was totally destroyed.

A serious rail accident occurred at the railway siding adjacent Upper Sturt railway station on 26 April 1886. A train comprising two locomotives and ten carriages travelling from Victor Harbor to Adelaide derailed when the first locomotive entered the siding and the second locomotive remained on the main line. The first locomotive tumbled over the embankment. The second locomotive lay derailed between the mainline and siding tracks. Approximately 450 passengers were on board the train at the time including John Brodie Spence, the Commissioner for Public Works in South Australia. There were no fatalities reported.

When the adjoining Nalawort station closed on 12 December 1945, Upper Sturt become the second railway station on the South Australian Railways system to have a tunnel between it and the next station in either direction. When Upper Sturt closed, Eden Hills became unique in this regard, although by then the South Australian Railways had ceased to exist.

The station closed on 23 September 1987, when the State Transport Authority withdrew Bridgewater line services between Belair and Bridgewater. The platform has since been demolished (approx 1993). The only remnants of the station are a clearing on the southern side of the line, where the platform once stood.

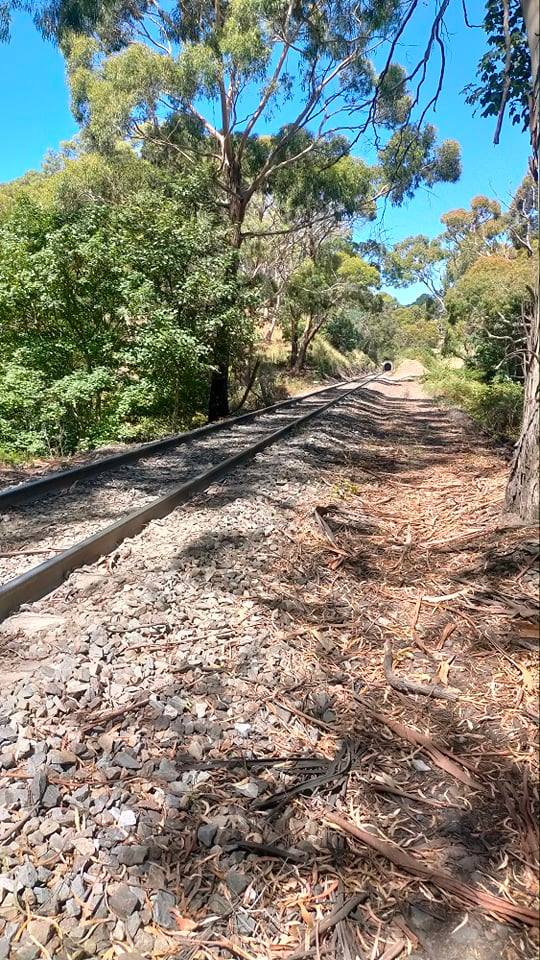
The clearing where the platform once stood. Tunnel number 8 is visible in the distance.
