= Strathalbyn Road =

Road in South Australia

Strathalbyn Road South Australia
- Coordinates: 35.015265°S 138.736389°E (Northwest end); 35.242973°S 138.894038°E (Southeast end)

General information
- Type: Road
- Length: 34.5 km (21 mi)
- Route number(s): B33 (1998–present)

Major junctions
- Northwest end: Mount Barker Road; Aldgate, South Australia
- Echunga Road; Battunga Road
- Southeast end: Long Valley Road; Strathalbyn, South Australia

Location(s)
- Region: Adelaide Hills, Fleurieu and Kangaroo Island
- Major suburbs: Mylor, Echunga, Macclesfield

Strathalbyn Road is a road in South Australia connecting the towns of Aldgate, Mylor, Echunga, Macclesfield and Strathalbyn, designated part of route B33.

== History ==
Strathalbyn Road previously served as the initial alignment of Princes Highway some time after it was first declared in South Australia in February 1922, initially defined along Mount Barker Road and then Strathalbyn Road from Adelaide via Aldgate, Mylor, Macclesfield, Strathalbyn, Langhorne Creek, crossing the Murray River at Wellington and then continuing along the present route beyond Meningie, By 1928, the route was re-aligned to run through Mount Barker and along Wellington Road via Wistow and Woodchester to Langhorne Creek, although by 1935 this alignment was changed to run via Nairne, Kanmantoo, Murray Bridge and Tailem Bend (along what is now known as the Old Princes Highway).

== Major intersections ==
LGA	Location	km	mi	Destinations	Notes
Adelaide Hills	Aldgate	0.0	0.0	Mount Barker Road (B33) – Stirling, Bridgewater, to South Eastern Freeway	Northwestern terminus of road, route B33 continues northwest along Mount Barker Road
Mount Barker	Echunga	13.3	8.3	Echunga Road (B34 north) – Hahndorf, Birdwood	Concurrency with route B34
Mount Barker	Echunga	13.5	8.4	Battunga Road (B34 south) – Meadows	Concurrency with route B34
Mount Barker	Macclesfield	23.6	14.7	Macclesfield Road (west) – Meadows; Gemmell Road (east) – Gemmells	
Alexandrina	Strathalbyn	34.5	21.4	Long Valley Road (B37) – Mount Barker, Langhorne Creek, Goolwa	Southeastern terminus of road and route B33
Concurrency terminus; Route transition
