= Carripook railway station =

Former railway station in South Australia, Australia

Carripook
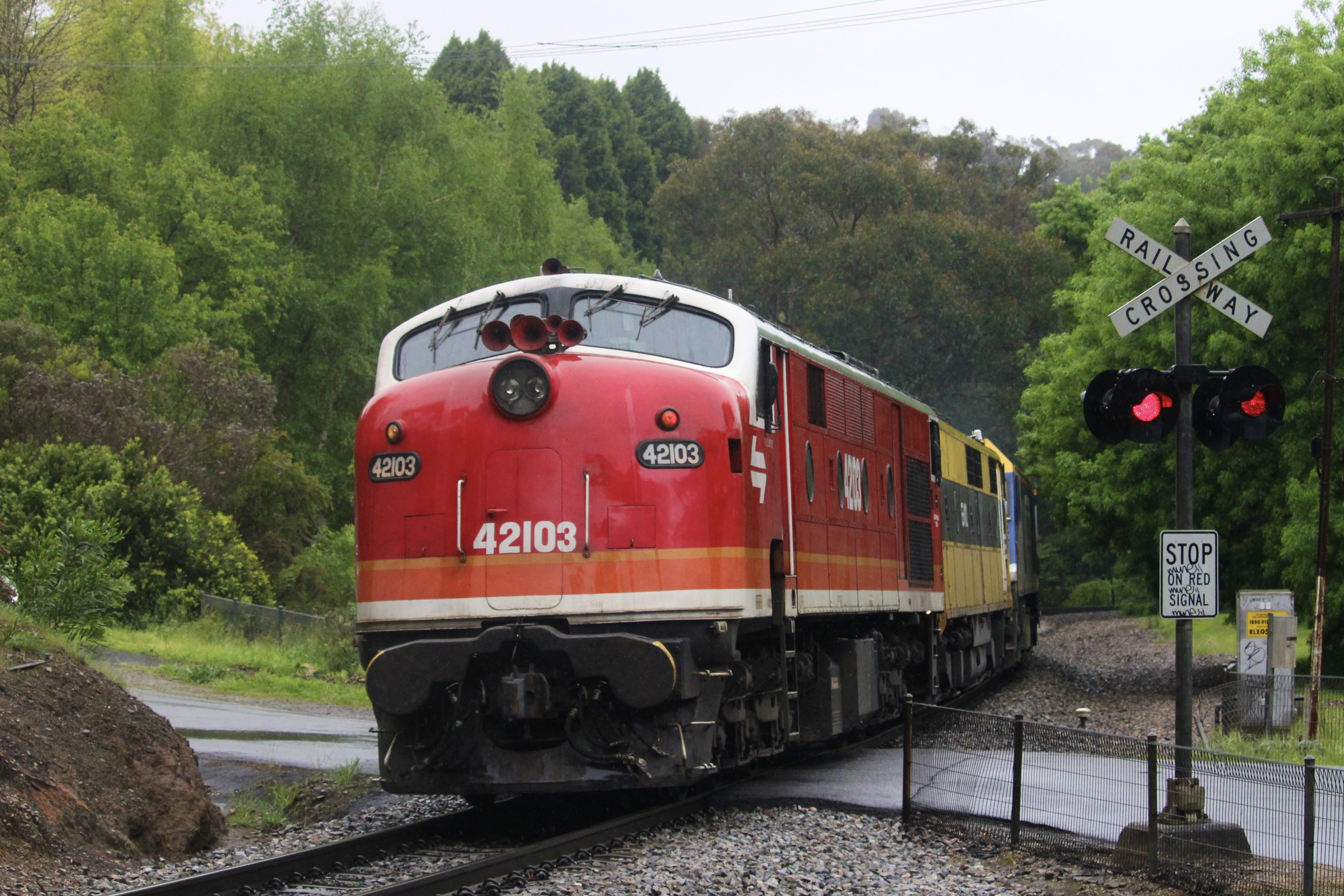
- A light engine train passing the former Carripook station site in October 2022

General information
- Location: Kain Avenue, Bridgewater
- Coordinates: 35.0086°S 138.7515°E
- Operator: State Transport Authority
- Line: Adelaide-Wolseley
- Distance: 36.36 kilometres from Adelaide
- Platforms: 1
- Tracks: 1

Construction
- Structure type: Ground

Other information
- Status: Closed

History
- Closed: 23 September 1987

Services
Preceding station	TransAdelaide	Following station
Jibilla towards Adelaide	Bridgewater line	Bridgewater Terminus
Location

Carripook railway station was located on the Adelaide-Wolseley line serving the Adelaide Hills suburb of Bridgewater to the east of the Kain Avenue level crossing. It was located 36.3 km from Adelaide station, at an elevation of 396 metres (1,299 ft).

== History ==
It is unclear when Carripook station was opened, but it was in service by 1935. It consisted of one 67 metre platform with a waiting shelter.

The station closed on 23 September 1987, when the State Transport Authority withdrew Bridgewater line services between Belair and Bridgewater. It was probably demolished around 1995 when the railway line was converted from broad to standard gauge.
