= Yantaringa railway station =

Former railway station in South Australia, Australia

Coordinates: 35°01′23″S 138°43′43″E

Yantaringa

General information
- System: Former South Australian Railways regional rail
- Operator: State Transport Authority
- Line: Adelaide-Wolseley
- Distance: 41.0 kilometres from Adelaide
- Platforms: 1
- Tracks: 1

Construction
- Structure type: Ground

Other information
- Status: Closed

History
- Opened: 1880s
- Closed: 1964

Services
Preceding station	Australian Rail Track Corporation	Following station
Bridgewater towards Adelaide	Adelaide–Wolseley railway line	Ambleside towards Serviceton
Location

Yantaringa railway station was located about 41 kilometres from Adelaide railway station on the Adelaide to Wolseley railway line.

== History ==
Yantaringa station and siding opened sometime around 1883. The station, which takes its name from an Aboriginal word for "big lookout", was located in the Adelaide Hills suburb of Verdun, and is a few hundred metres to the east of the Yantaringa Tunnel.

In 1925 it became a stopping place for rail motors. The station/siding closed in 1964.

== See also ==
- Bridgewater railway line
