= Long Gully railway station =

Former railway station in South Australia, Australia

Long Gully

General information
- Location: Saddle Hill Road, Belair National Park
- Coordinates: 35.0113°S 138.6709°E
- Operator: State Transport Authority
- Line: Adelaide-Wolseley
- Distance: 27.12 kilometres from Adelaide
- Platforms: 1
- Tracks: 1

Construction
- Structure type: Ground

Other information
- Status: Closed

History
- Closed: 23 September 1987

Services
Preceding station	TransAdelaide	Following station
National Park towards Adelaide	Bridgewater line	Nalawort towards Bridgewater
Location

Long Gully railway station was located on the Adelaide-Wolseley line in the Belair National Park, South Australia. It was located 21.1 km from Adelaide station.

== History ==
It is unclear when the station was opened. The original plan was for the siding to be named Minnow. There was a single platform on the northern part of the track, which was converted from timber to prefabricated concrete in the early 1970s; it also had a small loading platform servicing the siding line. The station was different from the others on the Bridgewater line, as it consisted of a staffed ticket office, and a signal cabin, which closed in 1977 with the introduction of centralised traffic control. The station was predominantly staffed by men, housed with their families, in one of three houses within the station yard boundaries.

Long Gully was a very useful station for hikers and bike riders, as the station was located within the national park. It closed on 23 September 1987, when the State Transport Authority withdrew Bridgewater line services between Belair and Bridgewater. The ticket office and nearby houses were demolished shortly after but most of the platform remains in place.

The layout of the passing siding is unusual as, being on an "S" in the main line, traffic in both directions defaulted to the sharper left side while crossing the points to enter the yard. This anomaly was removed when the line was converted to standard gauge in 1995 and the passing siding was replaced by a single line.

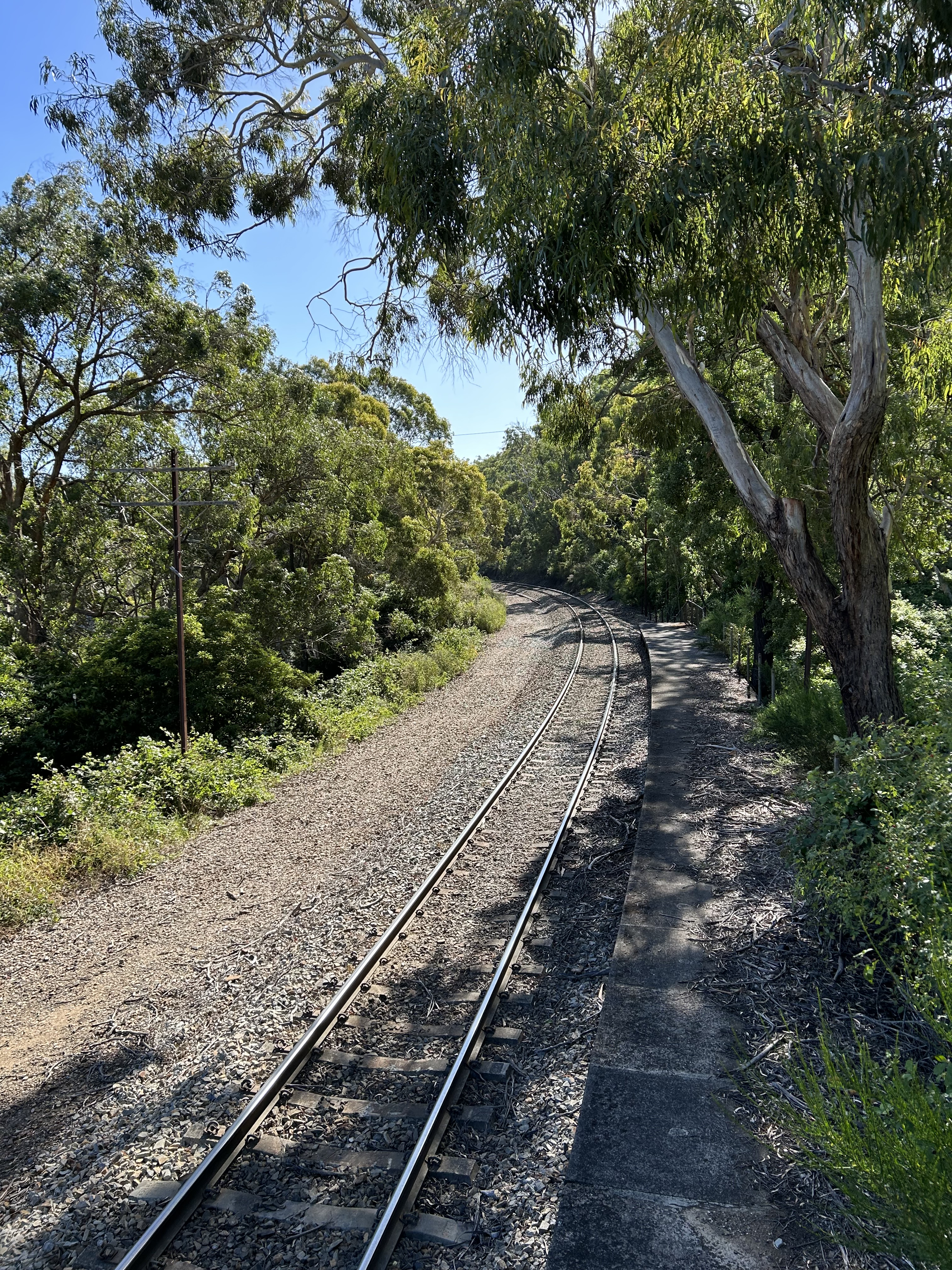
Long Gully Railway Station
