= Jibilla railway station =

Former railway station in South Australia, Australia

Jibilla
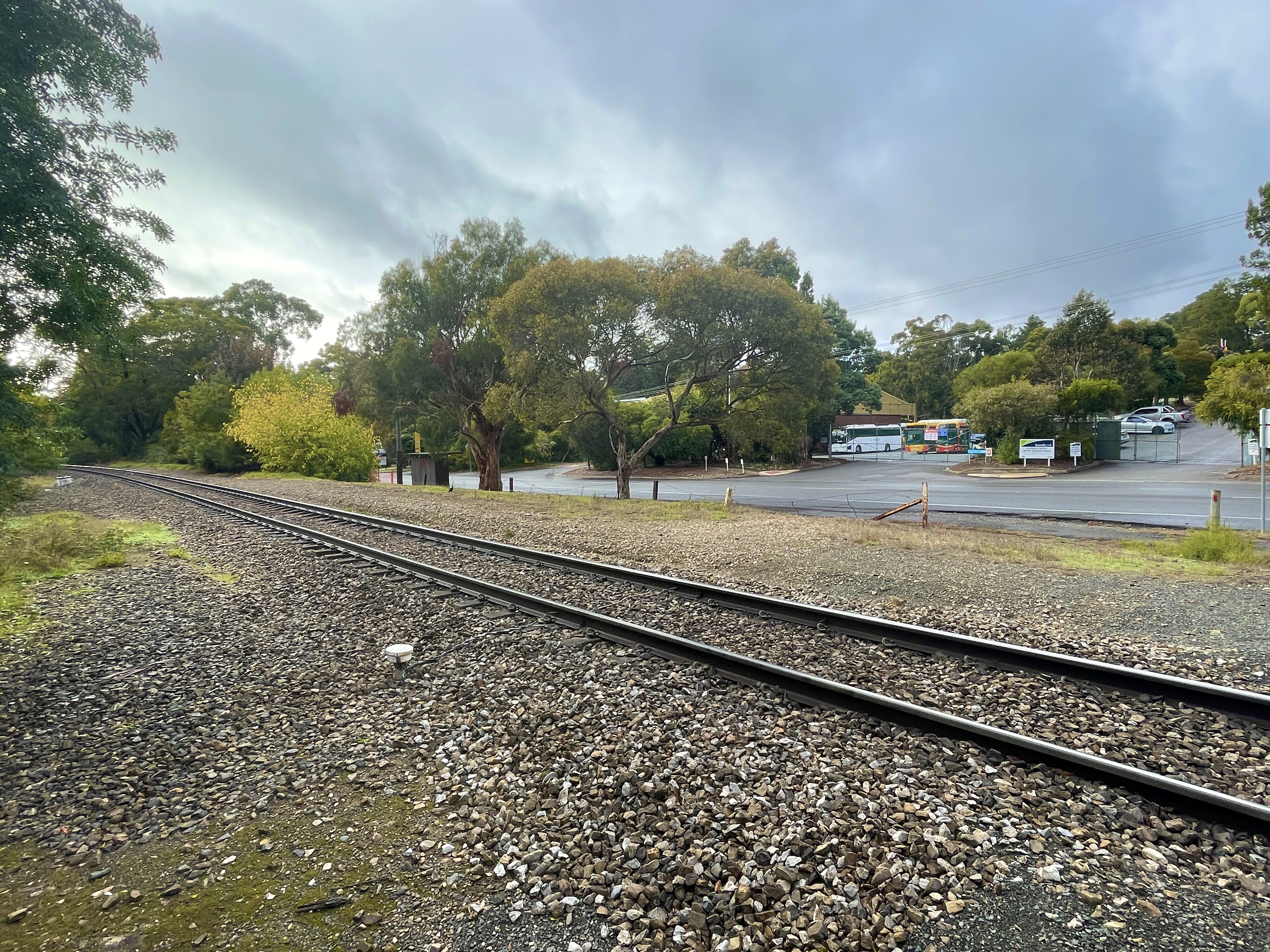
- The Jibilla station site looking southeast, April 2023

General information
- Location: Mount Barker Road, Aldgate
- Coordinates: 35.0119°S 138.744°E
- Operator: State Transport Authority
- Line: Adelaide-Wolseley
- Distance: 35.99 kilometres from Adelaide
- Platforms: 1
- Tracks: 1

Construction
- Structure type: Ground

Other information
- Status: Closed

History
- Closed: 23 September 1987

Services
Preceding station	TransAdelaide	Following station
Aldgate towards Adelaide	Bridgewater line	Carripook towards Bridgewater
Location

Jibilla railway station was located on the Adelaide-Wolseley line serving the Adelaide Hills suburb of Aldgate immediately east of the Yatina Road level crossing. It was located 36.0 km from Adelaide station.

== History ==
It is unclear when Jibilla station opened. Originally named Halliday's Crossing, it consisted of one 85 metre platform with a waiting shelter opening in the 1940s.

The station closed on 23 September 1987, when the State Transport Authority withdrew Bridgewater line services between Belair and Bridgewater. The platform has since been demolished.
