= Aldgate railway station =

Alberton railway station may refer to:

- Aldgate railway station, Adelaide, an Adelaide Metro railway station in South Australia
- Aldgate tube station, a London Underground station
- Aldgate East tube station, a London Underground station
