= Raywood, Aldgate =

Large house and gardens in Aldgate, South Australia

Coordinates: 35.0012°S 138.7497°E

Raywood, formerly named Arbury Park, is a property in the Adelaide Hills, South Australia. The 17-room Georgian-style house was constructed in 1935 to designs by Kenneth Milne for noted South Australian and Federal politician, Sir Alick Downer, who built the house and developed the formal garden as a setting akin to an English estate. Both the house and gardens (the latter truncated by construction of the South Eastern Freeway), are heritage-listed.

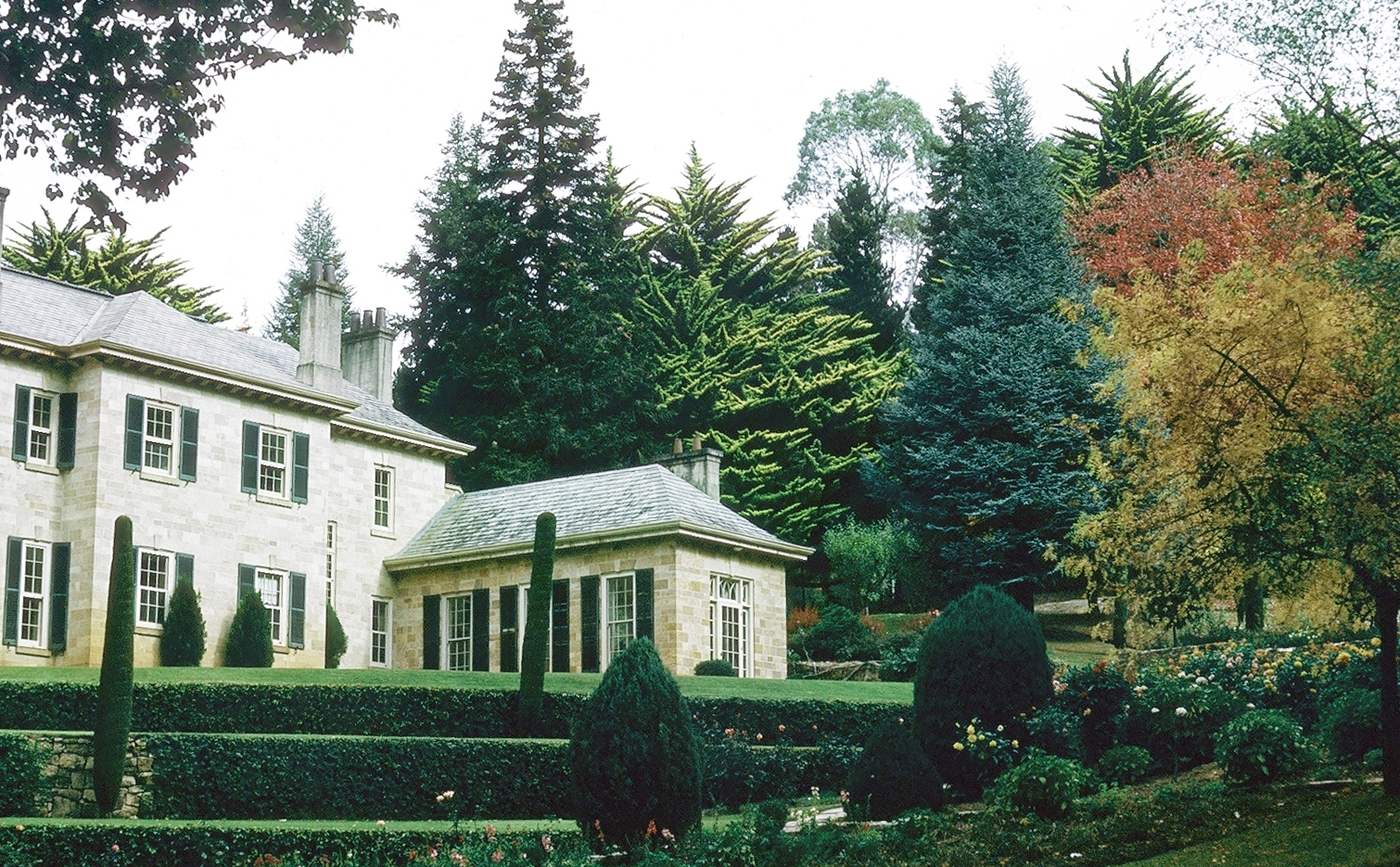
Raywood's house and gardens

== Background ==
The property is on Arbury Park Road, on the northern edge of Aldgate between Crafers and Bridgewater. Cox's Creek flows through the property.

The area covered by the property was first settled in the 1850s. Plots were owned by several people, who variously planted poplars, elms, and pine trees along the creek.

== 20th century ==
Tullie Cornthwaite Wollaston (1863–1931), known for his discovery and cultivation of the claret ash tree, bought a section of land in 1904, another in 1911, and further plots as they became available. He established the gardens, and about 1925 established Ray Nursery (named in memory of his son, a casualty of World War I) to encourage cultivation of native plants.

The Wollaston property was bought by Sir Alexander Downer in 1932, who lived in a cottage while he had the large house built in a Georgian style that he had admired in English country houses on a recent trip. Architect Kenneth Milne, (Note: Architect of the Regal Theatre, Kensington Park.) who had also recently taken a particular interest in Georgian architecture and the work of 18th-century Scots architects Robert and James Adam, designed the house, and it was built using Basket Range sandstone. Construction took place from September 1934 to August 1935. Downer named the mansion Arbury Park after Arbury Hall, near Nuneaton, Warwickshire, where his friends the Newdigate family lived.

Downer planned and laid out the garden, which included a series of terraces and flights of steps from the house down to a circular pool at the lower level. Claret ash, deodar cedar and copper beech had already been planted by Wollaston, and Downer added liquidambar, cypress and lime trees. Later, one of the pools was enlarged to make a water meadow, and a park stocked with 30 deer. In 1955 a chapel was built in memory of Downer's widowed mother – after having remarried in 1919 she became Mrs D'Arcy Addison.

In 1964 the new South Eastern Freeway route cut through the water meadow and deer park, and at this time the state government bought the property. After being transferred to the South Australian Education Department in 1965 to create the first Australian residential in-service teachers' training centre, the property reverted to its former name, Raywood. The Education Department built a dormitory-style accommodation building with 31 rooms to house the teachers.

== 21st century ==
The members of an Australian cult, the Ideal Human Environment (IHE) headed by James Gino Salerno ("Taipan"), purchased the two titles (accommodation block and main 17-roomed house) for A$2.4 million in 2001. They lived on the 10 ha (25-acre) property until 2008, before relocating to Kununurra in the Pilbara region in Western Australia. In 2019 Salerno was convicted of abusing a child at the property. The cult members called the house "the mansion" and the dormitory accommodation "the barracks".

In 2008, the mansion sold for about A$4 million, the price reduced by a million since 2006. It was bought by Port Adelaide Football Club director Alex Panas, who said that although the Salerno family had done a wonderful job of restoring the mansion, which had been a "huge mess" when they bought it, he planned to work with heritage experts to ensure the grandeur of the property was restored.

== Heritage listing ==
The house was confirmed on the South Australian Heritage Register in 1989; the garden, chapel, driveway and gates followed in 2000.

The SA Heritage Register states: "Developed in two stages, the garden is significant as a 1930s private estate garden established within an earlier 20th century garden. Raywood is significant as the location for the first propagation of the Claret Ash tree in Australia. The garden represents horticultural achievement for its collection of rare specimen trees, in particular a stand of Melaleuca linearifolia and collection of conifers. The garden is associated with the work of Tullie Cornthwaite Wollaston, an influential opal dealer important for his efforts at promoting Australian opals overseas and for the "discovery" and propagation of the Claret Ash. Sir Alexander Russell Downer, noted South Australian and Federal politician, built the house and developed the formal garden as the setting for the house which was important to his concept of the property as an English estate."
