= Cox Creek (South Australia) =

Australian river

Coordinates: 35°01′47″S 138°46′49″E

Cox Creek, also Cox's Creek, previously Cock's Creek, is a small stream in the southern Adelaide Hills. Cox's Creek was also the name of the settlement which became Bridgewater, South Australia.

== Description ==
The creek arises near Uraidla and flows in a southerly direction through the Piccadilly Valley, and joins the Onkaparinga River south of Bridgewater near the Mylor bridge.

It flows through the Raywood gardens, which, along with the large home, are heritage-listed on the SA Heritage Register.

== Naming ==
Robert Cock emigrated with his family to South Australia on HMS Buffalo, arriving in December 1836. He led a small exploration party from Adelaide to Lake Alexandrina in 1837, on Christmas Day camping at, and with some difficulty crossing, the creek which was named for him.

A settlement was later formed on the creek, some few kilometres from where Cock and party made their crossing, first naming it "Cock's Creek", then "Cox's Creek", finally "Bridgewater" named after James Addison's Bridgewater Hotel and John Dunn's Bridgewater Mill, which was powered by water from a dam on the creek.
