= Mylor Conservation Park =

Protected area in South Australia

- IUCN category III (natural monument or feature)
- Location within South Australia
- Location: South Australia
- Nearest city: Mylor
- Coordinates: 35°02′23″S 138°46′06″E
- Area: 45 ha (110 acres)
- Established: 27 February 1997
- Governing body: Department for Environment and Water
- Website: Official website

Mylor Conservation Park is a protected area located in the Australian state of South Australia in the suburb of Mylor in the Adelaide Hills state government region about 19 kilometres (12 mi) south-east of the state capital of Adelaide and about 1 kilometre (0.62 mi) north-east of the town of Mylor.

The conservation park consists of land in Allotment 51 of Deposited Plan 46510 and Section 3322 in the cadastral unit of the Hundred of Noarlunga. It is located within land east of Strathalbyn Road and west of the watercourse of the Onkaparinga River, and is accessed via Whitehead Road. Part of the land was previously used as a recreational facility called the Mylor Recreation Centre.

The Heysen Trail, the long distance walking trail, passes through the conservation park entering from the west via Whitehead Road and exiting in the north onto Hooper Road.

The conservation park came into existence on 27 February 1997 by proclamation under the National Parks and Wildlife Act 1972 which also ensured the continuation of “existing rights of entry, prospecting, exploration or mining” provided by the Mining Act 1971. This does not confer or preserve rights for recreational uses such as horse or bicycle riding. Recreation is governed by the management policies set out under the National Parks and Wildlife Act 1972, which restrict certain uses in conservation parks to protect natural values. As of 2016, it covered an area of 45 hectares (110 acres).

Vegetation in the southern part of the conservation park was surveyed in 2000 and subsequently described as consisting of an open forest of Eucalyptus baxteri and Eucalyptus obliqua over an understorey of Lepidosperma semiteres, Hakea carinata, Platylobium obtusangulum, Hakea rostrate, and Daviesia leptophylla.

The conservation park is classified as an IUCN Category III protected area.

== See also ==
- Protected areas of South Australia
