= Heathfield railway station =

Heathfield railway station may refer to:

- Heathfield railway station (Devon), England
- Heathfield railway station (East Sussex), England
- Heathfield railway station, Adelaide, South Australia
