= National Park railway station =

National Park railway station may refer to:

- National Park railway station, South Australia, a defunct station on the Adelaide-Wolseley railway line, formerly servicing the Belair National Park
- National Park railway station, Manawatu-Wanganui, a current station on the North Island Main Trunk, servicing the town of National Park, New Zealand
- Royal National Park railway station, a former railway station, now light rail, on the Royal National Park railway line, servicing the Royal National Park in New South Wales
