= Robert Cock =

Scottish explorer (1801–1871)

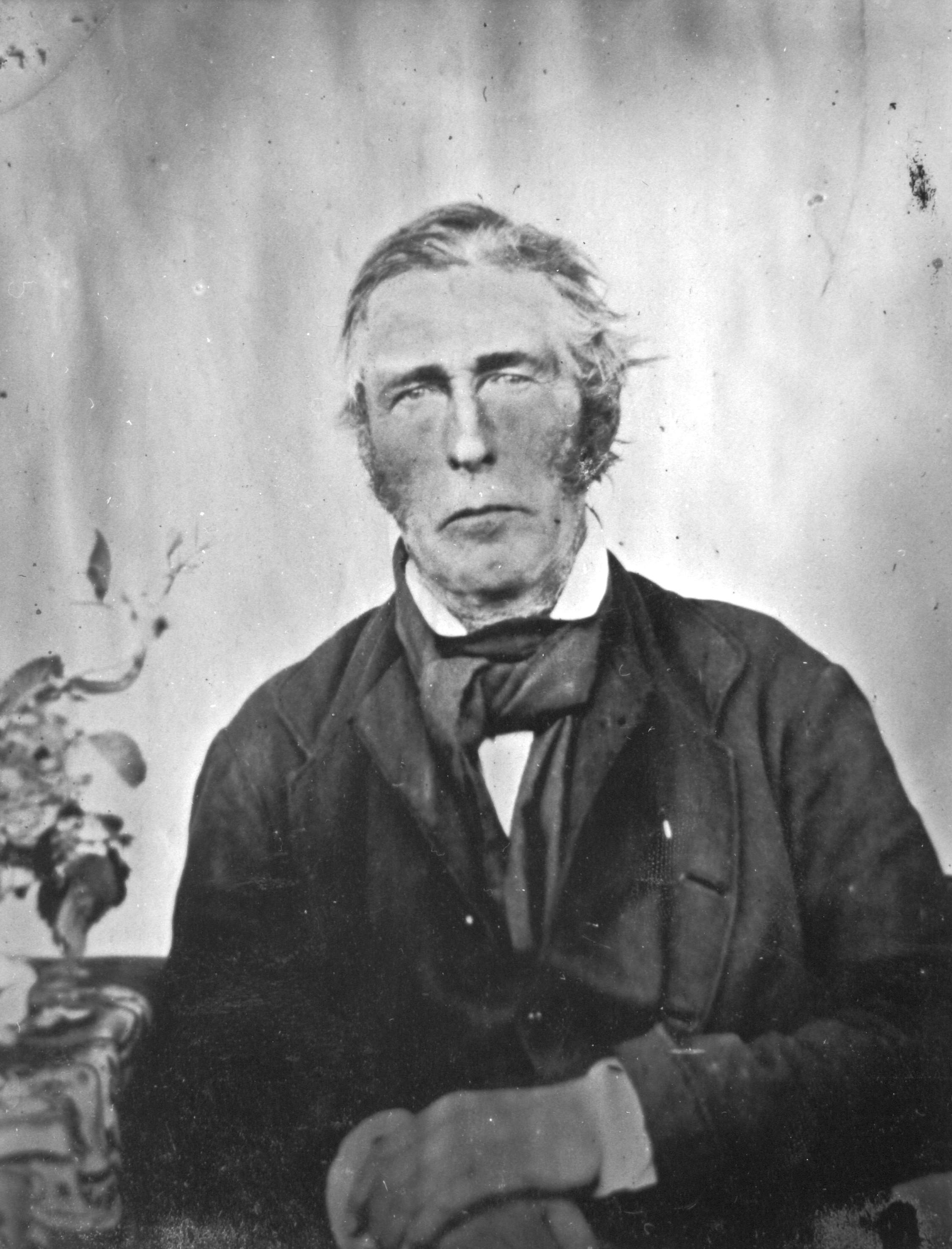
- Born: 1801; Fife, Scotland
- Died: 23 March 1871 (aged 69–70); Mount Gambier, South Australia
- Spouse(s): Elizabeth (Betty) Wishart (1805–1830) and Catherine Christie (1807–1870)
- Children: with Betty: Betty (Elizabeth) Benny (1824–1852), Christian Chambers (1825–1867), Agnes (Nancy) Kelly (1828–1848), Robert Cock (1828–1884) with Catherine: James Cock (1833–1901), Catherine Warren (1835–1881) Jane Squire (1838–1862), John Cock (1840–1914), Ann Cock (1847–1861), unnamed male Cock (1849–1849)
- Parent(s): Robert Cock (28 October 1876 Abbotshall, Fife, Scotland – 16 December 1939 Adelaide, South Australia) and Christian nee Williamson (1781–1836)
- Relatives: William Owen (brother-in-law), Reverend James Benny (son-in-law)

Robert Cock (25 May 1801 – 23 March 1871) was one of the first European explorers of the Adelaide region of South Australia following the establishment of the colony in December 1836.

== History ==
Robert was born in Dysart, Fife, Scotland in 1801, and arrived in South Australia with his family aboard HMS Buffalo in December 1836, thus being in the first group of settlers in the new colony. Robert actively set about setting up his business affairs in the new colony.

He set up a sort of thatched roof in which he and his wife and 6 children lived while he built a house. The house, when built, was used as a store and saleroom, and the family remained in the primitive shelter whilst he pursued his explorations".

He was appointed SA's first government auctioneer in early 1837, a position he held until November 1838. He was for a time in partnership with fellow Buffalo passenger William Ferguson as auctioneers, and owners of Magill estate (then spelled Makgill, named for Cock's trustee), which they subdivided.

He conducted explorations of the areas around Adelaide, and the Yorke and Eyre peninsulas. In December 1837, Robert led a party of William Finlayson, A. Wyatt and G. Barton to explore the country between Adelaide and Lake Alexandrina. Leaving Adelaide on 25 December, they became the first Europeans to climb Mount Barker (although there is a more plausible counter-claim by Sir John Morphett). They crossed and named the Hindmarsh and the Angas rivers, arriving at Lake Alexandrina on 31 December. (The Hindmarsh was subsequently renamed the Bremer). In his journal, Robert noted the suitability of the region for wine growing. (He is occasionally cited as being the first to identify the Adelaide Hills as suitable for wine growing e.g. Pike). There is a memorial cairn to the explorers in Bridgewater, near the Bridgewater Mill site. Cox's Creek (originally Cock's Creek) was named after him.

In June 1838, Robert discovered a carriage route through the Adelaide Hills, which opened up communication between Adelaide and the Mt Barker region.

In August 1838, Robert Cock along with Edward Eyre and Bewes Strangways travelled back to Mount Barker to meet the celebrated explorer Charles Sturt, who had driven stock from New South Wales to Adelaide

In December 1838, Robert and the surgeon, R. G. Jameson, conducted a survey of the east coast of Yorke Peninsula. They concluded "if we could have found a fresh water river, we would have found it a good country for the maintenance of flocks and herds. From the numerous native population it is obvious that there is no scarcity of fresh water, although we could not find it."

In May 1839, Robert explored the Port Vincent area in conjunction with James Hughes.

In June 1839, Robert led a party on the schooner Victoria, captained by Captain Hutchinson. They explored Spencer Gulf, following the western shores of the Yorke Peninsula and the coast of the Eyre Peninsula as far as Port Lincoln. "Water can be had at from ten to twenty feet from the surface. In all probability the peninsula will in time be a great agricultural district."

Robert also demonstrated concern for the welfare of the aboriginal population:

... Robert Cock was deeply disturbed to find that local authorities still had no intention of honouring a commitment made while still in Britain to set aside one fifth of all land to provide a fund for aboriginal welfare. Having bought land in Adelaide he felt morally obliged to pay interest on one-fifth of the purchase price. 'I felt it my duty', he informed the local Protector of Aborigines in 1838, 'to pay to the proper authorities for the use of the natives this yearly rent'. He denied that the money was a donation but 'a just claim that the natives of this district have on me as an occupier of those lands'.

On another occasion he intervened in a dispute between the aborigines and the settlers to prevent violence, reminding the settlers that the law was for protection of all.

After several years as a land agent, Robert took up farming, first at Balhannah in the Adelaide hills and by 1853 in Mount Gambier, where he was one of the original residents. Later on, he opened up a brewery in Mount Gambier.

Robert died in Mount Gambier in 1871, where he is buried in the Pioneers cemetery. A son, James Cock (1833–1901) was MHA for Victoria from 1890 to 1899.

== Family ==
Robert Cock married Elizabeth 'Betty' Wishart (1805–1830) on 15 Jan 1823 in Kilmany, Fife, Scotland. He married again, to Catherine Christie (23 March 1807 – 18 Apr 1870) on 28 May 1832 in Abdie, Fife, Scotland;

Robert and Catherine emigrated to South Australia in 1836 aboard HMS Buffalo with the children of both wives:

- Betty Cock (27 March 1824 Abdie, Fife, Scotland – 24 December 1852 Adelaide, South Australia) married the Reverend James Benny of Balhannah on 11 December 1846, James Benny went on to marry Frances Maria Robertson Just née Yeates
- Christian Cock (1825 – 7 December 1867) married Dr. Henry Chambers (1816 – 10 July 1881) of Nairne on 15 March 1847. Chambers was a nephew of Capt. Matthew Flinders. (His mother Henrietta Chambers, née Flinders, (29 January 1791 – 1838) married James Chambers on 14 Apr 1814).

- Elizabeth Christian Chambers (c. 1850 – 6 August 1911) married Arthur Greenway Pollitt (1 May 1842 – c. 26 January 1917), son of James Pollitt in 1878.

- Agnes (Nancy) Cock (15 August 1828 – 23 November 1848) married John Kelly (1819–1892) of Cumberland Farm, Mount Barker on 9 November 1847

- their daughter Agnes Cock (1848–1932) married Alexander Cumming Falconer (c. 1841 – 10 June 1885)

- Robert Cock (c. 1828 – 16 December 1884) brewer of Balhannah, then Kyneton, Victoria
- James Cock (1833–1901) married Magdalene Williams (1842 – 24 July 1923) on 4 October 1861

their children were:
- Anne Cock (1862– ) married William Henry Collins ( – ) on 6 January 1886, lived at Mount Gambier
- Mary Cock (c. 1865 – 27 July 1899) married W. H. Kilsby ( – ) lived at Mount Gambier
- Catherine Cock (1867–) married Alfred Ernest Tozer ( – ) of Port Wakefield on 3 October 1900; they lived at Scott Creek
- Jane Rosetta "Jean" Cock (1869 – 14 September 1936)
- Magdalene Cock (1872–) married George Arthur Hill in 1904
- Andrew Owen Cock (1875–) of Broken Hill
- David Gambier Cock (1881–) of Mount Barker

- Catherine Cock (c. 1835 – 14 October 1881) married William Warren ( – ) on 30 June 1855
- Jane Cock (1838 – 23 February 1862) married Edward Squire ( – )
- John Cock (c. 1840 – 29 December 1913) married Sarah Jones ( – ) in 1863
- Ann Cock (c. January 1847 – 29 September 1861)

Robert Cock's father, also named Robert Cock (c. 1776 – 16 December 1839) arrived in South Australia on the Catherine Jamieson in December 1838.

Two brothers and a sister arrived in November 1838 on the Rajasthan, chartered by Robert Cock;:

- Alexander Cock (c. 1809 – 10 July 1872) and his wife Mary Cock, née Thomson (1807 – 6 December 1885)
- James Cock ( – ) and his wife Christina Cock ( – ) (same person as Elizabeth Cock (c. 1802 – 31 January 1846)?)
- Christina Owen, née Cock ( – 4 May 1848), and her husband William Owen

Another brother, William Cock ( – ) arrived on Waterloo in June 1840.
