= State Transport Authority (South Australia) =

Former public transport agency in South Australia

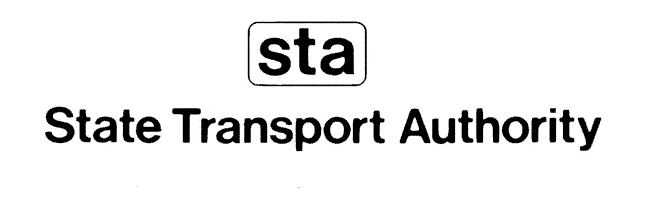

Government agency overview
- Formed: 18 April 1974
- Preceding Government agency: Municipal Tramways Trust South Australian Railways Transport Control Board
- Dissolved: 30 June 1994
- Superseding Government agency: Passenger Transport Board TransAdelaide
- Jurisdiction: South Australia
- Headquarters: Adelaide

The State Transport Authority (STA) was the state government-owned agency that controlled public transport in Adelaide, the capital of the Australian state of South Australia, between 1974 and 1994.

== History ==
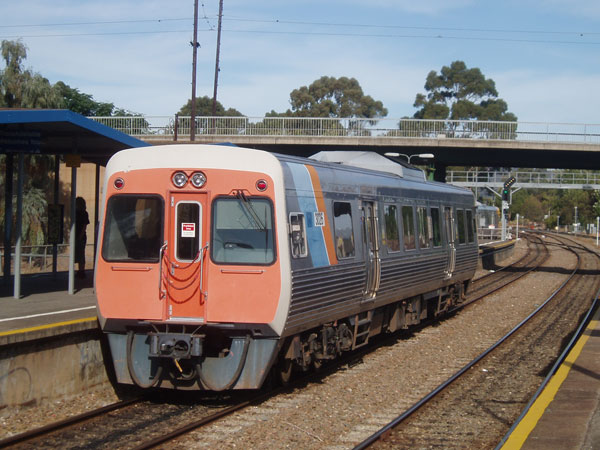
3000 class railcar 3025 in its original State Transport Authority livery at Goodwood station in May 2005

The State Transport Authority was established by the State Transport Authority Act 1974, which aimed to provide an integrated, coordinated system of public transport within South Australia. This was to be achieved by assuming direct control of state-operated services (particularly in the Adelaide metropolitan area) and by exercising regulatory control of privately operated services.

The STA was dissolved (and the 1974 Act repealed) as a consequence of the Passenger Transport Act 1994. These reforms split the STA into the Passenger Transport Board, which coordinated and funded the public transport system, and TransAdelaide, which actually operated metropolitan buses, trains and trams. The formation of TransAdelaide was a prelude to competitive tendering and the introduction of private operators into the Adelaide public transport network.

== Formation ==
In the period following the appointment of six members on the Authority's Board on 18 April 1974, three statutory authorities were dissolved and its functions were transferred to the State Transport Authority.^{:14–16} These were initially structured as three independent divisions of the STA:

- The South Australian Railways Commission became the Rail Division on 8 December 1975.
- The Municipal Tramways Trust (MTT) became the Bus & Tram Division, also on 8 December 1975. By this time all of Adelaide's tramways had closed, except the Glenelg tram line. However the MTT continued to operate most of the local bus routes in the inner metropolitan area, which often followed former tram lines. The MTT was also involved in buying out many of the private bus operators then operating in the Adelaide suburbs.
- The Transport Control Board became the Regulation Division.

Furthermore, additional powers to regulate privately owned services, aside from taxis in metropolitan Adelaide, were granted to the State Transport Authority.^{:14–16}

Following the handover of non-metropolitan railway lines to the Commonwealth on 1 March 1978, the separate divisions of the Authority were merged into a single organisation,^{:15,20} creating the Bus Traffic Branch and the Rail Traffic Branch.

== Sale of railways ==
In 1975, the Whitlam federal government proposed a nationalisation program for Australia's railways.^{:20} It was recognised at the time that Australia's system of separate state-controlled railways led to unnecessary duplication of facilities and administration, inefficient operating practices, high costs and the lack of a uniform national approach to railway policy. Whitlam's proposal aimed to address these issues.

South Australia and Tasmania were the only states which agreed to the nationalisation plan, as both their railways had incurred large amounts of debt and because the state and federal governments at the time were aligned.^{:20} In South Australia's case, the transfer agreement only extended to railways outside the Adelaide suburban area.

On 1 July 1975, the Federal Government took over financial responsibility for the non-metropolitan railways in South Australia and reimbursed the South Australian government for operating deficits incurred after this time.^{:iii} After the formation of the Rail Division on 8 December 1975, the STA continued to administer and operate all the former South Australian Railways (SAR) on behalf of the Federal government.^{:15} This interim arrangement lasted for over two years while the precise details of the sale of South Australia's railways were devised, disputed and re-negotiated, and the operating and management structures of the new Federal-controlled railway were put into place.^{:35}

Eventually, on 1 March 1978 the responsibility for management of all South Australia's non-metropolitan railways was transferred to the Australian National Railways Commission. This included much of the former SAR infrastructure, rolling stock and staff.^{:20}

The STA retained ownership and responsibility for all the suburban railway system around Adelaide, including the centrally located Adelaide railway station, the entire fleet of Red Hen railcars and two 830 class diesel-electric locomotives. At the same time, two divisions – the Rail Division and the Bus and Tram Division – were combined.

== Chronology ==
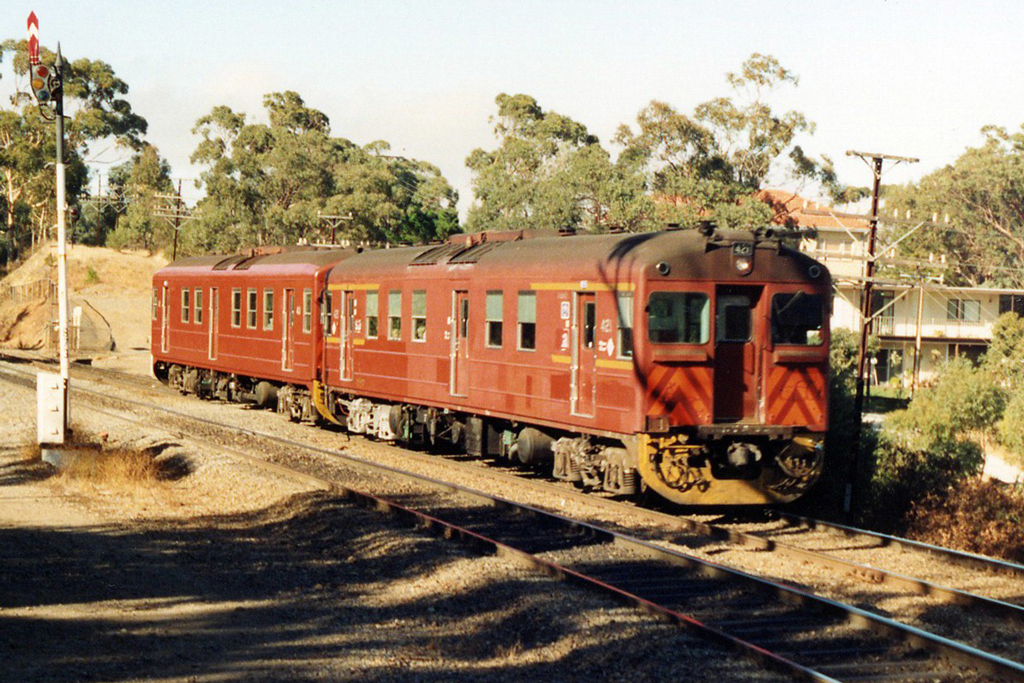
Two double-ended STA 400 class Red Hens railcars working a Belair line service in 1990

The following developments occurred in Adelaide's public transport system during the STA era.

- 25 January 1976; The Hallett Cove line was extended southwards from Hallett Cove Beach to a temporary terminus at Christie Downs. The opening of the rail line extension was the first public event where the new STA name and logo was prominently used.
- 1976; Smoking was banned on Adelaide's buses.
- 4 February 1977; A new bus depot was opened at Morphettville in the south-western suburbs.
- 1977 to 1980; The STA took delivery of 307 new Volvo B59 buses. The Volvos updated and standardised the metropolitan bus fleet, which at the time comprised a wide variety of vehicle types and ages following buy-out of a number of private operators. The last example was withdrawn from service in 2003.
- 31 October 1977; The Circle Line bus service was introduced.
- 1 March 1978; Non-metropolitan railways were transferred to Australian National.
- 2 April 1978; The Christie Downs line was extended southwards from Christie Downs to Noarlunga Centre.
- 28 October 1978; The Semaphore line closed between Glanville and Semaphore.
- October 1978 to April 1979; The wooden Goodwood Overpass over the railway lines at Goodwood station was replaced with the current concrete structure. The wooden bridge had been built in 1929, at the time the line was converted from a railway to tramway.
- 4 February 1979; A zone-based fare integrated ticketing system was introduced across Adelaide, allowing transfers between modes.
- 17 August 1979; Finsbury line closed between Woodville and Finsbury. Redhen railcar 429 worked the last regular passenger service.
- 1 February 1980; Hendon line closed between Albert Park and Hendon. Redhen railcar 403 worked the last regular passenger service.
- 22 February 1980; The first 2000 class railcars entered public service, 2101, 2102 and 2001 ran its first passenger service on 22 February 1980 while 2103, 2104 and 2002 were introduced shortly after. Delivery of the new trains continued until August 1981 when 2118 and 2012 were the final cars to be delivered.
- 1980; The first Pressed Metal Corporation South Australia bodied Volvo B58 and B10M buses were delivered for services into the Adelaide Hills and longer-distance suburban routes. They were painted in a characteristic brown and custard colour livery, leading to their nickname "Brown Bombers". Known for their distinctively loud transmission whine, these buses were to become a familiar sight over the next 25 years, especially in the Adelaide Hills and outer suburbs until their withdrawals between 2004 and 2006.
- 1981; New rail stations were opened in September 1981 at North Haven on the Outer Harbor line, and in November 1981 at Christie Downs on the Noarlunga line.
- 13 September 1981; Port Dock station closed.
- 1982; The first MAN SL200 buses entered service. These were the last buses to be delivered in the classic all over silver livery (with white roof), which dated from MTT days. Originally, these buses were mostly used on shorter distance city routes, the last was withdrawn in 2011.
- 18 May 1984; The few remaining Australian National (AN) country passenger trains and The Overland to Melbourne were transferred from Adelaide station to the new interstate facility at Keswick Terminal. Keswick Terminal allowed access by interstate passenger trains such as The Ghan and Indian Pacific which used the newly opened standard gauge line from Crystal Brook. It also allowed AN to avoid paying access charges to the STA for use of Adelaide station.
- 1985; The ASER project, involving major redevelopment of Adelaide railway station commenced.
- 17 December 1985; Salisbury Interchange on the Gawler line opened to provide improved bus – rail connections in the northern suburbs. Salisbury was the second purpose-built bus-rail interchange in Adelaide, Noarlunga Centre had been the first.
- 2 March 1986; The first six kilometre stage of the O-Bahn Busway opened between the city's eastern fringe and Paradise Interchange in the north-eastern suburbs. The O-Bahn is a unique public transport system, running on specially built concrete track with modified Mercedes-Benz O305 buses and combining elements of both bus and rail systems.
- 9 March 1986; Relocated Grange station opened to avoid level crossing on Military Road.
- 18 October 1986; The Glenelg tram depot was relocated from Angas Street in the Adelaide city centre to a new purpose-build facility at Glengowrie.
- 31 May 1987; North Arm Road, Wingfield and Eastern Parade stations on the Port Adelaide-Dry Creek line closed.
- 24 July 1987; Northfield line services between Dry Creek and Northfield cease.
- 26 July 1987: Bridgewater line services between Belair and Bridgewater cease.
- 27 September 1987; A new Crouzet computerised ticket system was introduced across the STA bus, train and tram system. This formed the basis of today's MetroTicket system. Paper tickets were replaced by magnetic-stripe tickets, which are checked by an electronic validating machine each time a passenger boards a vehicle, and Weekly and Monthly tickets were replaced by 10-journey Multitrips.
- November 1987: The first of a new fleet of 3000 class railcars entered public service. These replaced the Redhen railcars, which had been the mainstay of the suburban train service since the late 1950s.
- 1988: The ASER redevelopment project was completed at Adelaide station. The station platforms became effectively underground, with the Hyatt Regency hotel and Adelaide Convention Centre built above. The former main station building was re-opened as the Adelaide Casino.
- 29 May 1988; Port Adelaide-Dry Creek line closed to regular passenger traffic. Redhen railcars 372/373 worked the last passenger movement.
- 20 August 1989; The second stage of the 12 kilometre O-Bahn Busway opened between Paradise Interchange and Tea Tree Plaza Interchange at Modbury. The final cost of the project was A$98 million, which included the new fleet of specially-modified buses, based at St Agnes depot.
- 1990; Following rebuilding of the tracks and platforms in 1985 – 88, the Adelaide station concourse was refurbished.
- 1990; A four-year project to renew outdated signalling on the STA railway system was completed. New signals were installed and all STA trains and rail lines were supervised from a computerised traffic control centre in Adelaide station yard.
- January 1991; Penfield railway line services between Salisbury and Penfield 3 railway station cease.
- 17 February 1992; The first Transit Link limited-stop bus route, numbered TL1, was introduced between Aberfoyle Park and Adelaide. This initiative aimed to attract peak-hour motorists onto public transport by providing frequent, fast, limited-stop services, using high-quality vehicles and traffic priority schemes (e.g. bus lanes and bus-priority traffic signals) where practical.
- 1992; Driver-only operation was introduced on STA trains and guards were progressively withdrawn. This led to a significant increase in fare evasion, since there were no-longer regular ticket inspections, and there was generally nowhere on the trains or stations to buy a ticket if a casual traveller had not planned ahead and pre-purchased one from a retail outlet. The reduced supervision also helped compound a trend of increasing vandalism, disorderly behaviour and crime that had plagued the STA system (both bus and train) since the late 1980s. The transit police force was increased and Transit Officers replaced guards on some trains, but negative public perceptions about personal safety and difficulty in getting tickets and information resulted in decreased patronage of many services.
- 16 August 1992; A new bus depot was opened at Mile End and the Hackney depot was closed. Hackney had been the main depot in Adelaide since the first electric tram lines opened in 1909, and had subsequently been converted by the MTT for use by trolleybuses and diesel buses.
- 16 August 1992; The Transit Link concept was introduced on two new bus routes (TL2 to West Lakes and TL3 to Golden Grove and Elizabeth), and to express peak-hour trains on three of the main rail lines.
- 16 August 1992; Changes were implemented which reduced services on most bus and train routes at night and at weekends. Train frequencies were reduced from approximately every 45 minutes to hourly. On the bus network, a separate "Nights & Sundays" pattern of routes was introduced, which often combined one or more daytime routes into circuitous and one-way hybrid routes. The rationale stated at the time was that evening and weekend services were very poorly patronised and the changes were needed to free resources to operate the new Transit Link routes.
- 5 July 1993; A bus-rail interchange was opened at Smithfield on the Gawler line.
- 21 November 1993; The successful Transit Link concept was extended to five new bus routes, TL6 to TL10.
- 30 June 1994; The STA was dissolved as a result of the Passenger Transport Act 1994 with its functions transferred to the Passenger Transport Board and TransAdelaide.

== Railway line closures ==
In past years, one feature of Adelaide's railway system was the number of industrial branch lines which were intended mainly for freight, but were also provided with passenger trains at peak hours. These industrial trains were progressively rationalised during the STA era, along with some other lightly used services.

Railway closures in STA era
Destination	Date of last train	Stations closed
Semaphore	29 October 1978	Semaphore; Exeter
Finsbury	17 August 1979	Woodville North; No.18 Shed; Finsbury Stores
ICI Osborne	1 January 1980	ICI Osborne
Hendon	1 February 1980	Hendon
Port Dock	11 September 1981	Port Dock
Islington Workshops	31 July 1986	Islington Works
Northfield	24 July 1987	Cavan; Pooraka; Northfield
Bridgewater	26 July 1987	National Park; Long Gully; Upper Sturt; Mount Lofty; Heathfield; Madurta; Aldgate; Jibilla; Carripook; Bridgewater
Dry Creek to Port Adelaide	27 May 1988 (§ closed 29 May 1987)	§ Wingfield § North Arm Road § Eastern Parade; Grand Junction Road; Rosewater
Penfield	4 January 1991	Hilra; Penfield 1 Penfield 2 Penfield 3
GMH Elizabeth	14 August 1992	GMH

Note regarding closure dates: Common railway practice is to record the official closure of a line as a date which falls on a Sunday. In cases where the train service only operated Monday to Friday, this means the last train would actually have run on the preceding Friday. This was the situation in most (but not all) examples in the table above. Hence the "last train" date quoted may differ by a day or two from the official record.

== Publications ==
Keeping Track was the STA's house journal that was founded by the SAR in August 1973, when Rail News was renamed. It continued to be published until April 1976.
