= Upper Sturt, South Australia =

Upper Sturt
- Suburb
- Coordinates: 35°01′30″S 138°40′56″E
- Country: Australia
- State: South Australia
- LGAs: City of Mitcham; Adelaide Hills Council
- Location: 19 km (12 mi) from Adelaide

Government
  - State electorates: Heysen; Waite
  - Federal division: Mayo

Population
  - Total: 1,005 (SAL 2021)
- Postcode: 5156
Suburbs around Upper Sturt
Belair	Crafers West	Crafers
Hawthorndene	Upper Sturt	Stirling
Coromandel East	Ironbank	Heathfield

Upper Sturt is a suburb in the inner south of Adelaide, South Australia. The suburb is nestled in the lower reaches of the Mount Lofty Ranges with the western portion located in the City of Mitcham local government area, and the eastern portion located in the Adelaide Hills Council Local Government Area.

Before being gazetted with a place name, the area was often referred to on civil birth, death and marriage registrations as "near Government Farm", which later became Belair National Park.

The Upper Sturt area had two stations on the Adelaide-Bridgewater railway line, which was constructed through the area in the late 1870s: Nalawort and Upper Sturt, both of which have closed and structures mostly removed.

Upper Sturt Primary School was founded in 1879, and has approximately 41 students.

Upper Sturt Post Office opened on 1 March 1881.

There is a small cafe on the main road that also incorporates a general store adjacent to the Upper Sturt General Store. The Upper Sturt Country Fire Service station which is a volunteer fire organisation to protect the area from bushfires.

== See also ==
- List of Adelaide suburbs
