= Nalawort railway station =

Former railway station in South Australia, Australia

Nalawort

General information
- Location: Princes Avenue, Crafers West
- Coordinates: 35.013°S 138.686°E
- Operator: South Australian Railways
- Line: Adelaide-Wolseley
- Distance: 28.00 kilometres from Adelaide
- Platforms: 1
- Tracks: 1

Construction
- Structure type: Ground

Other information
- Status: Closed

History
- Closed: 12 December 1945

Services
Preceding station	TransAdelaide	Following station
Long Gully towards Adelaide	Bridgewater line	Upper Sturt towards Bridgewater
Location

Nalawort railway station was located on the Adelaide-Wolseley line serving what is now the Adelaide Hills suburb of Crafers West. It was located 28.0 kilometres from Adelaide station.

== History ==
Nalawort was opened in the 1920s as a stopping place for rail motors, suggesting it was opened when the Brill Model 75 class railcars entered service. The station closed on 12 December 1945. There is a clearing on the southern side of the line where the platform once stood. The only other remnants of the station are a set of steps, which lead to the station from the Long Gully substation next to Princes Avenue.

== Closure ==
The Nalawort Station officially closed on 12 December 1945 after the rail motor service was no longer needed. Today, the remains of the station site is reduced to a clearing in the trees and steps from the platform.

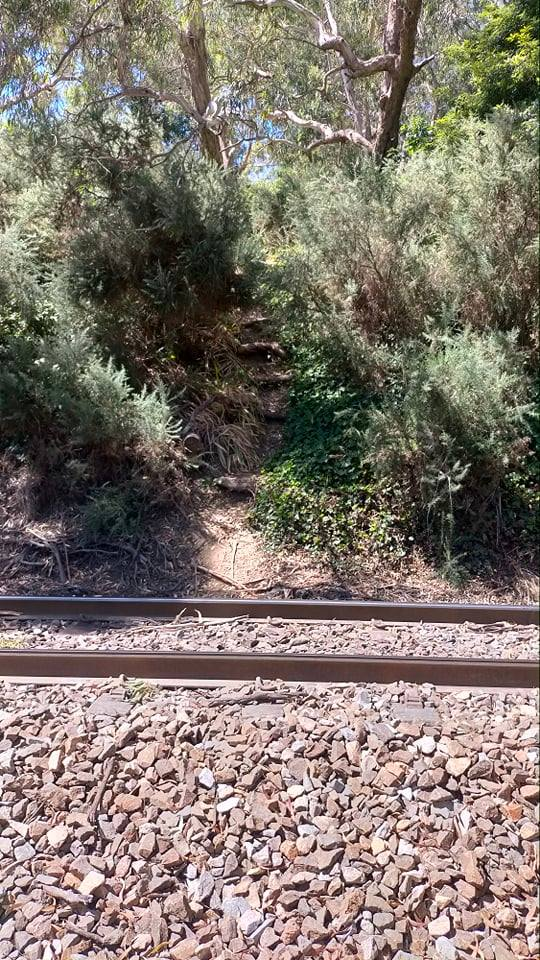
The steps which lead from Princes Avenue to the station
