= National Park railway station, South Australia =

Former railway station in South Australia, Australia

National Park

General information
- Location: Saddle Hill Road, Belair
- Coordinates: 35°00′53″S 138°39′31″E
- Operator: State Transport Authority
- Line: Adelaide–Wolseley
- Distance: 25.85 kilometres from Adelaide
- Platforms: 1
- Tracks: 1

Construction
- Structure type: Ground

Other information
- Status: Closed

History
- Closed: 23 September 1987

Services
Preceding station	TransAdelaide	Following station
Belair towards Adelaide	Bridgewater line	Long Gully towards Bridgewater
Location

National Park railway station was a railway station in South Australia located on the Adelaide–Wolseley line in the suburb of Belair and within the boundaries of the Belair National Park. It was located 25.8 kilometres from Adelaide station.

== History ==
It is unclear when National Park railway station was opened. It consisted of one 80-metre platform with a waiting shelter, and was popular with bike riders on weekends.

The station closed on 23 September 1987, when the State Transport Authority withdrew Bridgewater line services between Belair and Bridgewater. The platform and shelter shed have since been demolished.
