= Heathfield, South Australia =

Heathfield South Australia
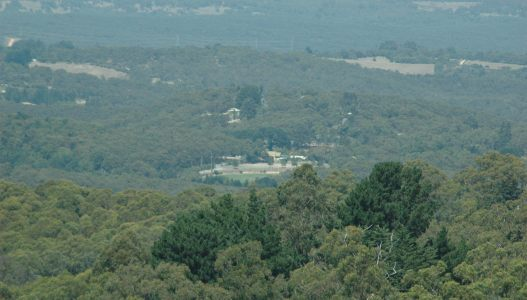
- Heathfield

- Coordinates: 35°01′0″S 138°43′0″E
- Population: 1,062 (SAL 2021)
- Postcode(s): 5153
- LGA(s): Adelaide Hills Council
- Federal division(s): Mayo
Localities around Heathfield:
Upper Sturt	Stirling	Aldgate
Ironbank	Heathfield	Aldgate
Scott Creek	Scott Creek	Mylor

Heathfield is a township in the Adelaide Hills of South Australia near Stirling. It is home to Heathfield High School, Heathfield Primary School, Heathfield Oval, the Heathfield Waste Depot, Mount Lofty Sand and Metal, Masonic homes (retirement Village), a biodynamic farm and a proposed service station development, along with numerous walking trails. Heathfield is also located close to Mount Lofty Ranges. The small country suburb of Heathfield also contains a small conservation park known as Woorabinda. This is used daily by residents to walk their dogs; and ducks to receive free food.

The proposed service station is currently a source of controversy, with some local residents creating a petition against the development and others supporting it. The Adelaide Hills Council have also opposed the development.

Heathfield is a mix of country living, while still being only 15 minutes from the Adelaide City centre. As such, it has a diverse mix of middle, to upper middle class residents seeking a secluded home, and farmers. At the 2006 census, Heathfield had a population of 1,000, and a median house price of $632,000.

== Transport ==
Heathfield is serviced by bus routes 865 and 894H. Route 865 (formerly 868) connects to the City in either Stirling or Aldgate, with most services continuing to Crafers as route 866. Some peak-hour services also continue to the city. Route 894H is a school bus to Blackwood interchange.

Until 1987, Heathfield was served by State Transport Authority Bridgewater railway line commuter passenger train services.

== Education ==
Heathfield High School is situated in the Adelaide Hills and has a special focus on volleyball. The Special Interest Volleyball Program is aimed at developing young volleyball players and has become the most successful volleyball school in Australia.
