= Aldgate railway station, Adelaide =

Former railway station in South Australia, Australia

Coordinates: 35°00′51″S 138°43′58″E

Aldgate
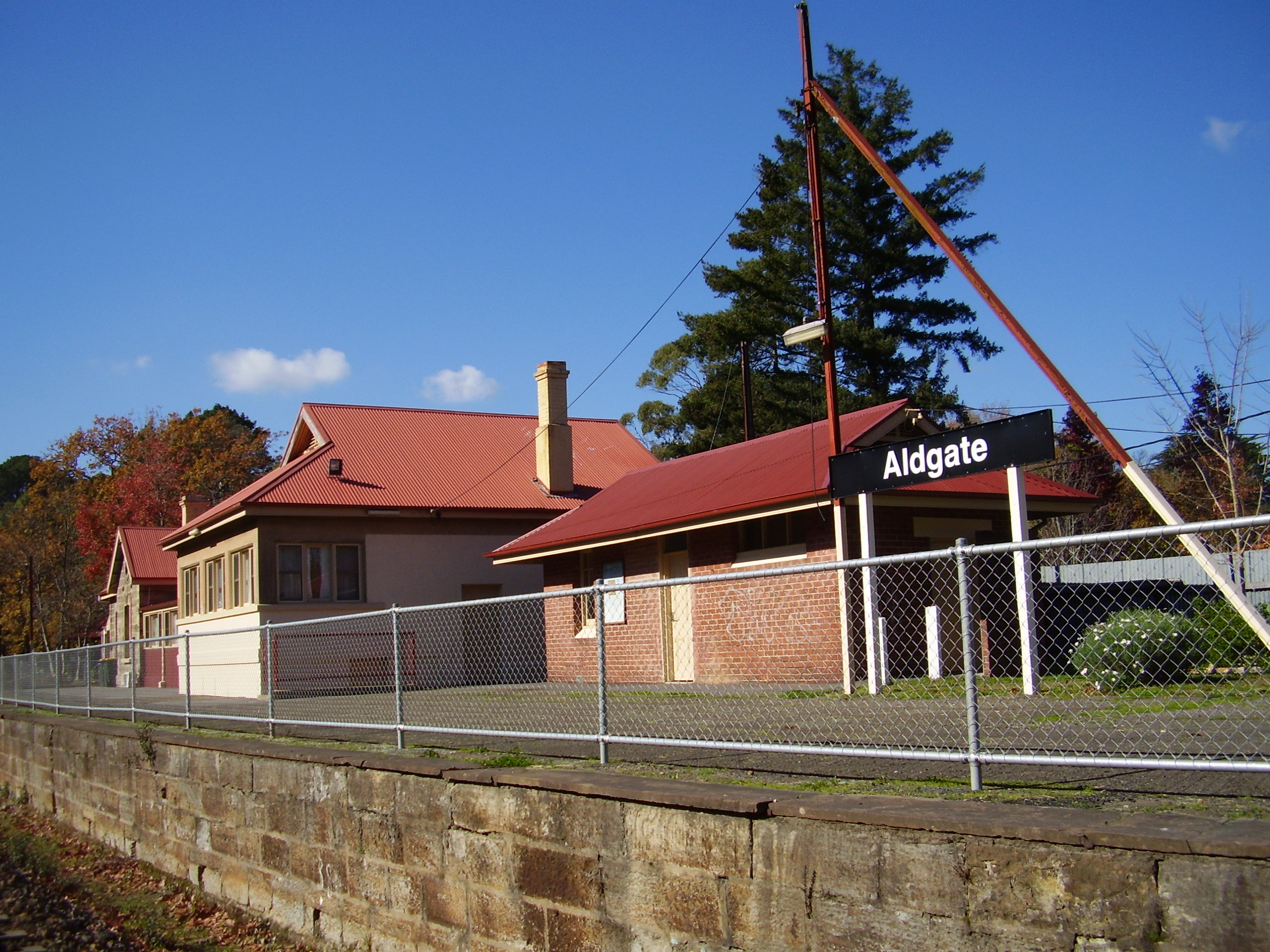

General information
- Location: Mount Barker Road; Aldgate
- Line: Adelaide-Wolseley line
- Distance: 34.90 km from Adelaide
- Platforms: 1
- Bus routes: None

Construction
- Parking: No
- Cycle facilities: No

History
- Opened: 14 March 1883
- Closed: 23 September 1987*

Services
Preceding station	TransAdelaide	Following station
Madurta towards Adelaide	Bridgewater line	Jibilla towards Bridgewater
Location

Aldgate railway station was located on the Adelaide-Wolseley line in the Adelaide Hills suburb of Aldgate, 34.9 kilometres from Adelaide station.

== History ==
Aldgate station opened on 14 March 1883, and on 23 December 1886, a second platform was added. From 1 May 1910, most services from Adelaide station were extended to terminate at Aldgate. On 1 July 1929, the westbound platform was converted to an island platform. In 1974, the goods siding was replaced by a second crossing loop. It was very similar to Blackwood; the station building and shelter were the same.

It was closed to local trains on 23 September 1987, but until 1990 was available for passengers wishing to board the Mount Gambier-bound railcar service. At the time of closure, Aldgate had three platforms. Platform 1 was a 151-metre-long side platform, and platforms 2 and 3 were a 149-metre-long island platform. The island platform was demolished in the 1990s, but the side platform remains in place, although no longer in use. A crossing loop was provided, but was removed when the line was converted to standard gauge in 1995. The station building now functions as The Hut Community Centre.
