= Stirling, South Australia =

Stirling
- Town
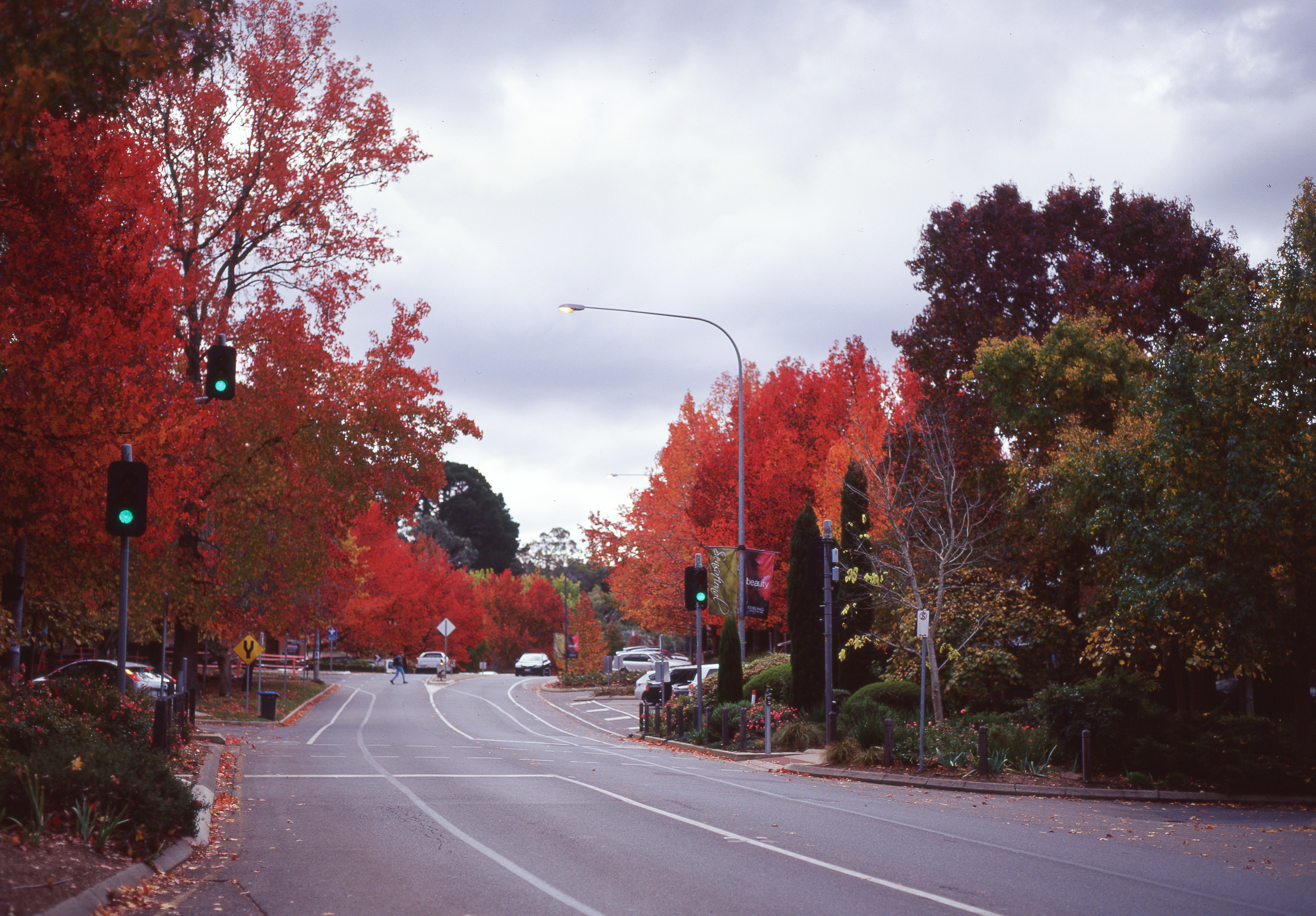
- Main Street in autumn

- Coordinates: 35°00′0″S 138°43′0″E
- Country: Australia
- State: South Australia
- LGA: Adelaide Hills Council
- Established: 1854

Government
  - State electorate: Heysen
  - Federal division: Mayo
- Elevation: 496 m (1,627 ft)

Population
  - Total: 3,067 (SAL 2021)
- Time zone: UTC+9:30 (ACST)
  - Summer (DST): UTC+10:30 (ACDT)
- Postcode: 5152
- Mean max temp: 17.8 °C (64.0 °F)
- Mean min temp: 8.6 °C (47.5 °F)
- Annual rainfall: 1,112.1 mm (43.78 in)
Localities around Stirling
Crafers	Piccadilly	Mount George
Crafers West	Stirling	Aldgate
Upper Sturt	Heathfield	Aldgate

Stirling is a small town in the Adelaide Hills, South Australia, approximately 15 km from the Adelaide city centre. It is administered by the Adelaide Hills Council. Neighbouring townships are Crafers and Aldgate. Other nearby towns are Heathfield and Bridgewater. Of those five, Stirling has the largest commercial strip, and used to have the greatest number and widest variety of shops, and the only bank. Once there were multiple banks but all but one have left. A fire destroyed the main shopping complex in the main street in 2023, and is scheduled to be rebuilt by autumn 2027. Stirling East, a similar sized area towards Aldgate, is home to a school.

== History ==
Stirling is named after Edward Stirling. He was the illegitimate son of Archibald Stirling, a planter in the British West Indies, and a Creole woman. He was able to travel to South Australia because of a financial gift from his father who had been freshly compensated for his slaves on the emancipation of the British West Indies.

Founded in 1854, Stirling grew rapidly as a result of the expansion of apple growing and market gardening to satisfy the demand of the expanding city of Adelaide, whose centre is only 15 kilometres from Stirling. It also developed as a residential address for English migrants who could afford it, to escape Adelaide's hot summers, often 10 degrees cooler than Adelaide. As a result, many historic, grand mansions can be found in the area. Today, farming has declined as more of the region has been urbanised, with many Stirling residents commuting to Adelaide daily.

== Vegetation ==
Many deciduous trees, particularly the maple, elm, oak and ash trees, have been imported from Europe and North America. These trees flourish in Stirling's wet and mild to cool climate and are a popular tourist attraction in the autumn months (April–May), bringing rich and vibrant autumn leaf colour to the town. Some Australian cities are too warm (even in the autumn and winter months) to accommodate and produce maple trees, but some temperate regions along the eastern coast and towns at higher altitudes flourish in colour during autumn, rivalling those in North America, Europe and Japan.

Other tourist sites include the nearby Mount Lofty Botanic Garden and Cleland National Park.

== Climate ==
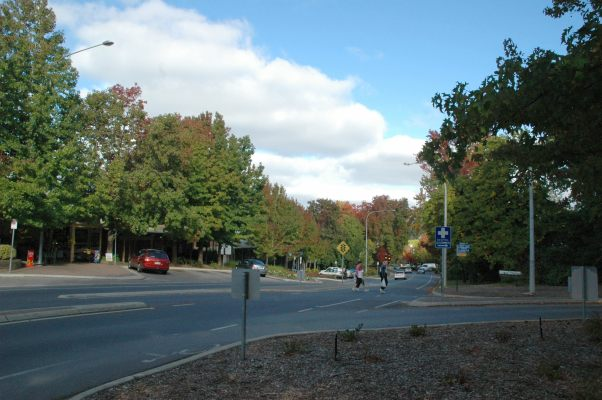
Main street during summer.

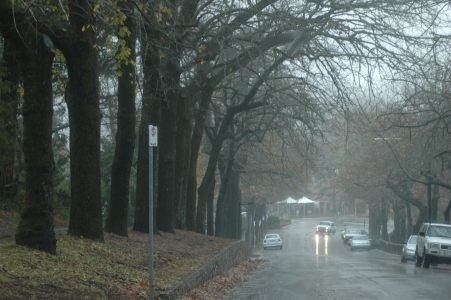
Looking down Druid Avenue through wet autumn weather

Stirling has a borderline oceanic climate/warm-summer mediterranean climate (Köppen: Cfb/Csb). It experiences pleasant, relatively mild summers & quite cool, rainy winters. Owing to its location near Mount Lofty, Stirling is the wettest place in South Australia, receiving an average of 1,107 millimetres (43.6 inches) of rain per year—more than twice the average of Adelaide. Between May and August, the average monthly rainfall is as high as 155 millimetres (over 6 inches), and in June 1916, over 450 millimetres fell. Mean summer temperatures are about 5 °C (9 °F) lower than in Adelaide, which may explain why Stirling was recommended as a desirable residence for English migrants and Adelaide's high society in the 20th century. Winters are distinctly cool particularly compared to Adelaide, with an average minimum of 4 °C (39 °F) and an average maximum of 11 °C (52 °F).

The climate table below combines information from 3 weather stations. Temperature and rainfall were sourced from Stirling Post Office (1964-1985), humidity was extracted from Stirling (1926-1964) and sunshine data was taken from Waite Institute (1965-1986).

Climate data for Stirling (35.00°S 138.72°E, 496 m (1,627 ft) m AMSL) (1926-1986 data)
Month	Jan	Feb	Mar	Apr	May	Jun	Jul	Aug	Sep	Oct	Nov	Dec	Year
Record high °C (°F)	40.7 (105.3)	39.5 (103.1)	36.0 (96.8)	32.1 (89.8)	24.3 (75.7)	19.2 (66.6)	21.7 (71.1)	27.9 (82.2)	28.0 (82.4)	30.6 (87.1)	37.0 (98.6)	37.6 (99.7)	40.7 (105.3)
Mean daily maximum °C (°F)	24.9 (76.8)	25.4 (77.7)	21.9 (71.4)	18.2 (64.8)	14.6 (58.3)	11.8 (53.2)	10.8 (51.4)	11.9 (53.4)	13.8 (56.8)	17.3 (63.1)	20.1 (68.2)	22.6 (72.7)	17.8 (64.0)
Mean daily minimum °C (°F)	12.4 (54.3)	12.8 (55.0)	11.2 (52.2)	9.4 (48.9)	7.6 (45.7)	5.6 (42.1)	5.1 (41.2)	5.3 (41.5)	6.1 (43.0)	7.5 (45.5)	9.2 (48.6)	10.9 (51.6)	8.6 (47.5)
Record low °C (°F)	4.8 (40.6)	5.6 (42.1)	3.8 (38.8)	2.2 (36.0)	0.7 (33.3)	−1.0 (30.2)	−1.4 (29.5)	−2.2 (28.0)	0.0 (32.0)	0.7 (33.3)	2.2 (36.0)	2.8 (37.0)	−2.2 (28.0)
Average precipitation mm (inches)	36.8 (1.45)	37.5 (1.48)	54.3 (2.14)	96.7 (3.81)	127.5 (5.02)	118.0 (4.65)	175.1 (6.89)	147.2 (5.80)	119.7 (4.71)	91.9 (3.62)	61.7 (2.43)	47.0 (1.85)	1,112.1 (43.78)
Average precipitation days (≥ 0.2 mm)	7.5	5.5	9.7	12.4	15.8	15.9	19.4	19.4	16.2	13.9	10.4	9.0	155.1
Average afternoon relative humidity (%)	40	42	44	57	67	73	73	67	58	55	49	45	56
Mean monthly sunshine hours	294.5	257.1	232.5	168.0	124.0	99.0	105.4	136.4	162.0	217.0	237.0	263.5	2,296.4
Percentage possible sunshine	67	68	61	50	40	34	34	41	46	54	57	59	51
Source: Bureau of Meteorology (1964-1985 normals & extremes), (1926-1964 humidity), (1965-1986 sun)

== Government ==
Stirling is located in the state electorate of Heysen and in the federal Division of Mayo. The local council is the Adelaide Hills Council (formerly Stirling Council) in the Mt Lofty and Manoah wards.

== Culture ==
A landmark in Stirling is the historic Stirling Theatre, home to the Hills Musical Company, Stirling Players and Hills Youth Theatre. Stirling once had a strong affinity with books and has been referred to as South Australia's 'Book Village'. This related to the close proximity of varied book venues Chapter Two Books, Matilda Bookshop, The Hut Book Shed and the Coventry Memorial Library.

== Fire service ==
The Stirling community is protected from fire, road crash and hazardous materials by the Stirling Country Fire Service Volunteers. In 2006, the Adelaide Hills Council stepped up efforts to relocate the station to Crafers, against the wants of the volunteers. The council proposed the move in order to sell the land currently inhabited by the CFS station on Avenue Road, to fund a new library. However, in mid-2006 the council elected to sell the land the fire station was on to SAFECOM (South Australian Fire and Emergency Services Commission), which owns all Fire Service assets. Despite this, the new library started construction in early 2007, and it was completed the following year.

== Transport ==
Stirling is well-serviced by public transport, with multiple bus routes running through it during both peak and off-peak hours, on weekdays and weekends.

- Routes 801, T801, and N801 run between Adelaide and Mount Barker, via Mount Barker Road.
- Routes 863 and T863 run between Adelaide and Aldgate, via Mount Barker Road.
- Route 822 runs between Adelaide and Stirling, via Carey Gully.
- Route 866 runs between Aldgate and Crafers, via Longwood Road and Piccadilly Road
- Route 894H runs between Aldgate and Blackwood, via Longwood Road and Upper Sturt Road.

== List of famous former residents ==
- Michael Atchison OAM (1933–2009), Australian cartoonist
- C. J. Coventry (born 1991), English-Australian historian and political advisor
- Tiffany Cromwell (born 1988), Australian road and gravel cyclist
- Boyd Dawkins (1917–1996), South Australian politician
- Colin Russell Gardiner, abstract artist, worked with Stan Ostoja-Kotkowski
- Lleyton Hewitt (born 1981), Australian tennis player
- John Leak (1892–1972), Australian soldier
- Jimmy Melrose (1913–1936), Australian aviator
- Jack Murray (cricketer) (1892–1974), Australian cricketer
- Walter Scott (Australian footballer) (1899–1989)
- Edward Stirling (1808–1873), Scottish politician
