= Aldgate, South Australia =

Aldgate
- Suburb
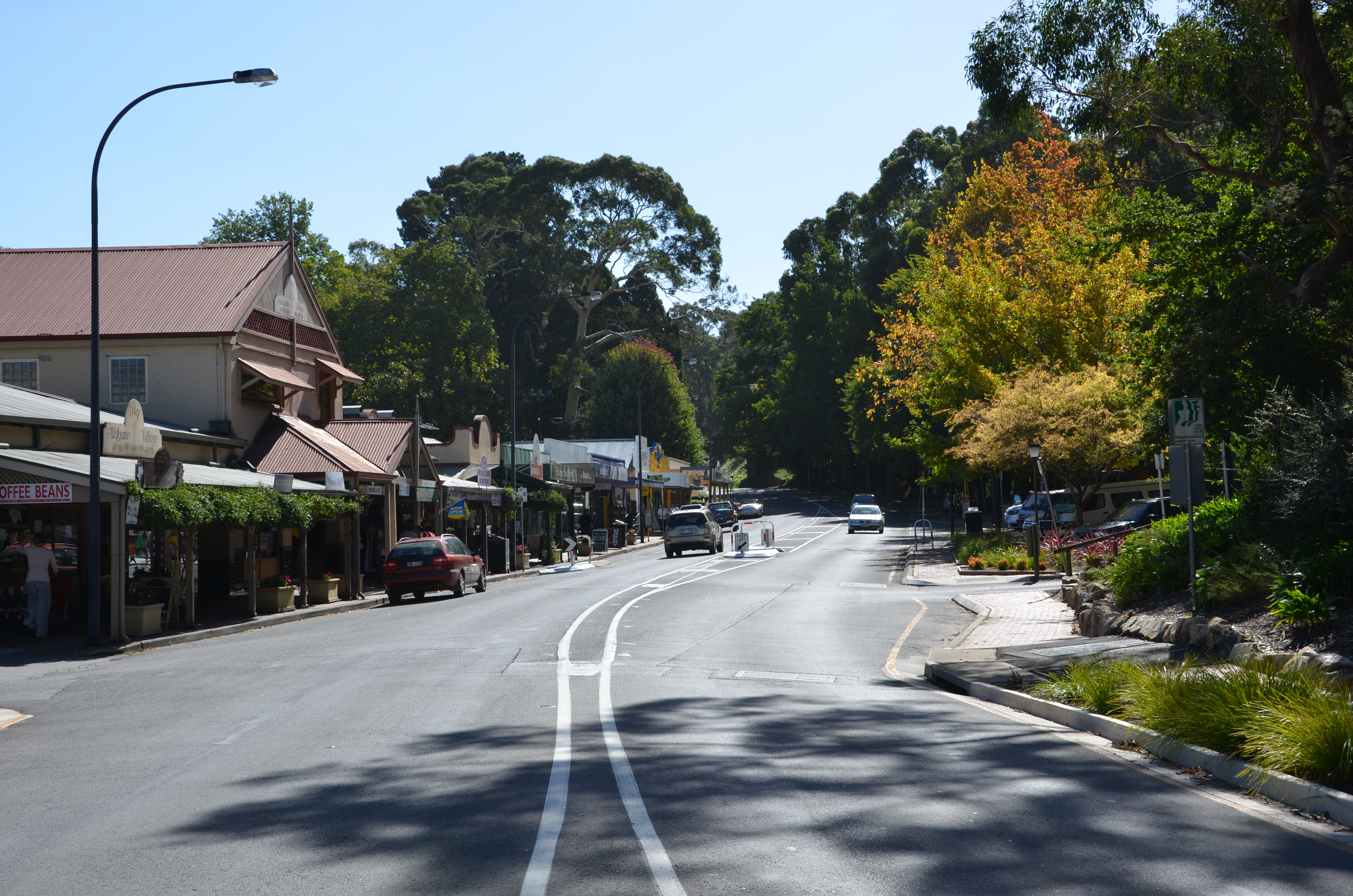
- Aldgate main street

- Coordinates: 35°01′02″S 138°44′16″E
- Country: Australia
- State: South Australia
- Region: Adelaide Hills
- City: Adelaide
- LGA: Adelaide Hills Council
- Location: 21 km (13 mi) south east of Adelaide via
- Established: 1882

Government
  - State electorate: Heysen
  - Federal division: Mayo
- Elevation: 304 m (997 ft)

Population
  - Total: 3,471 (SAL 2021)
- Postcode: 5154
Suburbs around Aldgate
Upper Sturt	Stirling	Stirling
Heathfield	Aldgate	Bridgewater
Heathfield	Mylor	Mylor

Aldgate is a South Australian village and a suburb of Adelaide, located 21 km (13 mi) south-east of the Adelaide city centre, in the Adelaide Hills.

== History ==
An inn called the Aldgate Pump was opened by Richard D. Hawkins, a well-known publican, in 1864. Hawkins, who had emigrated from London, England, to the Province of South Australia in 1842, already owned several hotels, including the nearby Crafers Inn in present-day Crafers. The pump which Hawkins had installed outside the hotel (and which gave the hotel its name) became a popular place to water the horses and bullock teams which passed through the area, and by 1870, a small settlement had been established. Hawkins claimed at that time that some 60,000 people a year passed through the hotel's doors. The hotel became quite famous, at one point being described as "one of the best decorated of its kind in the colony" with "magnificent chandeliers".

The pump and hotel, and subsequently the town, were named after Aldgate in London. The word derives from ealdgate, the Old English word meaning "old gate". The Hills Land and Investment Company subdivided land in the Aldgate area and laid out part section 92, Hundred of Noarlunga for settlement in 1882, naming the town after the hotel.

=== 21st century ===
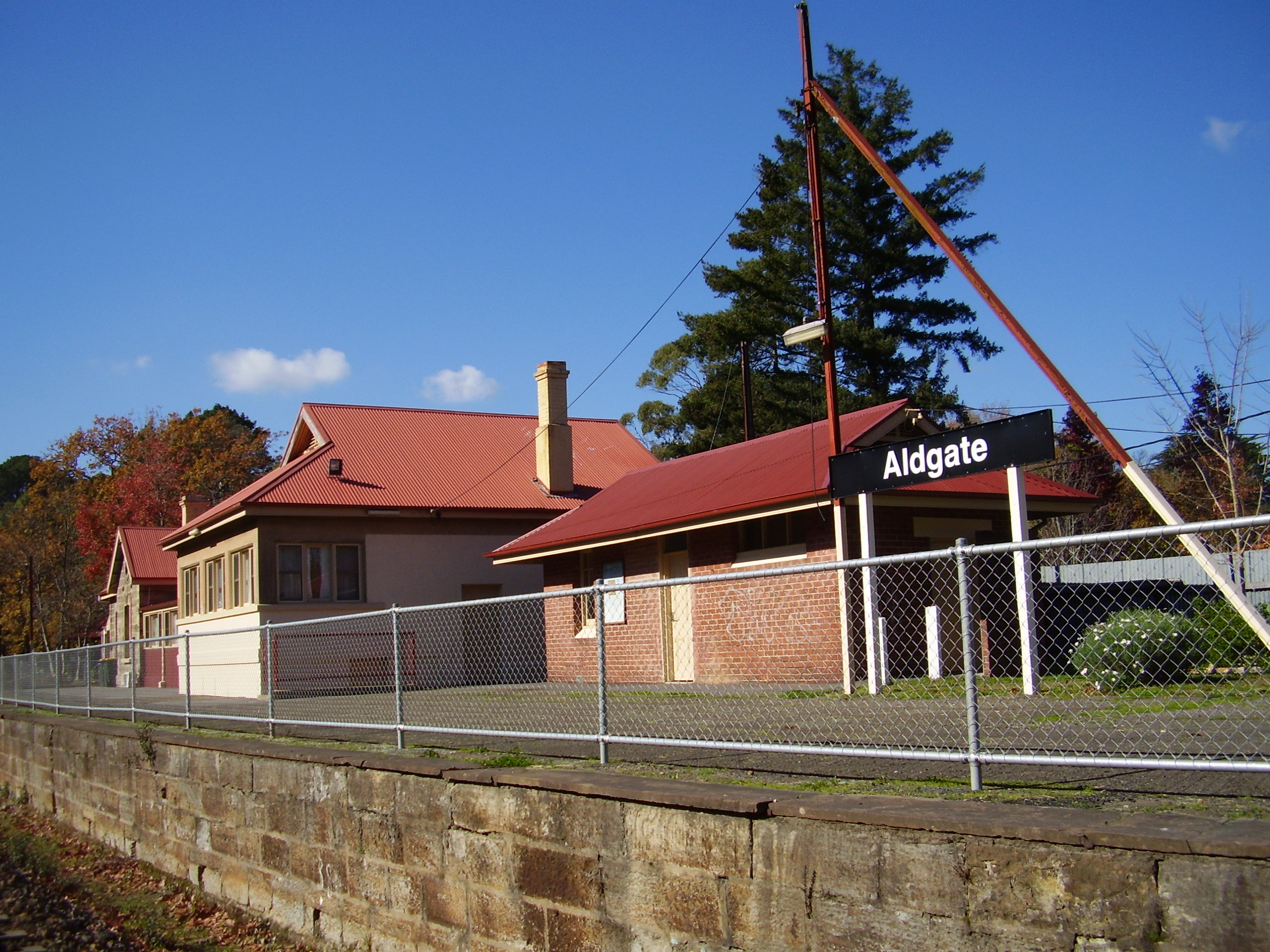
Aldgate's railway station was closed in the late 1980s.

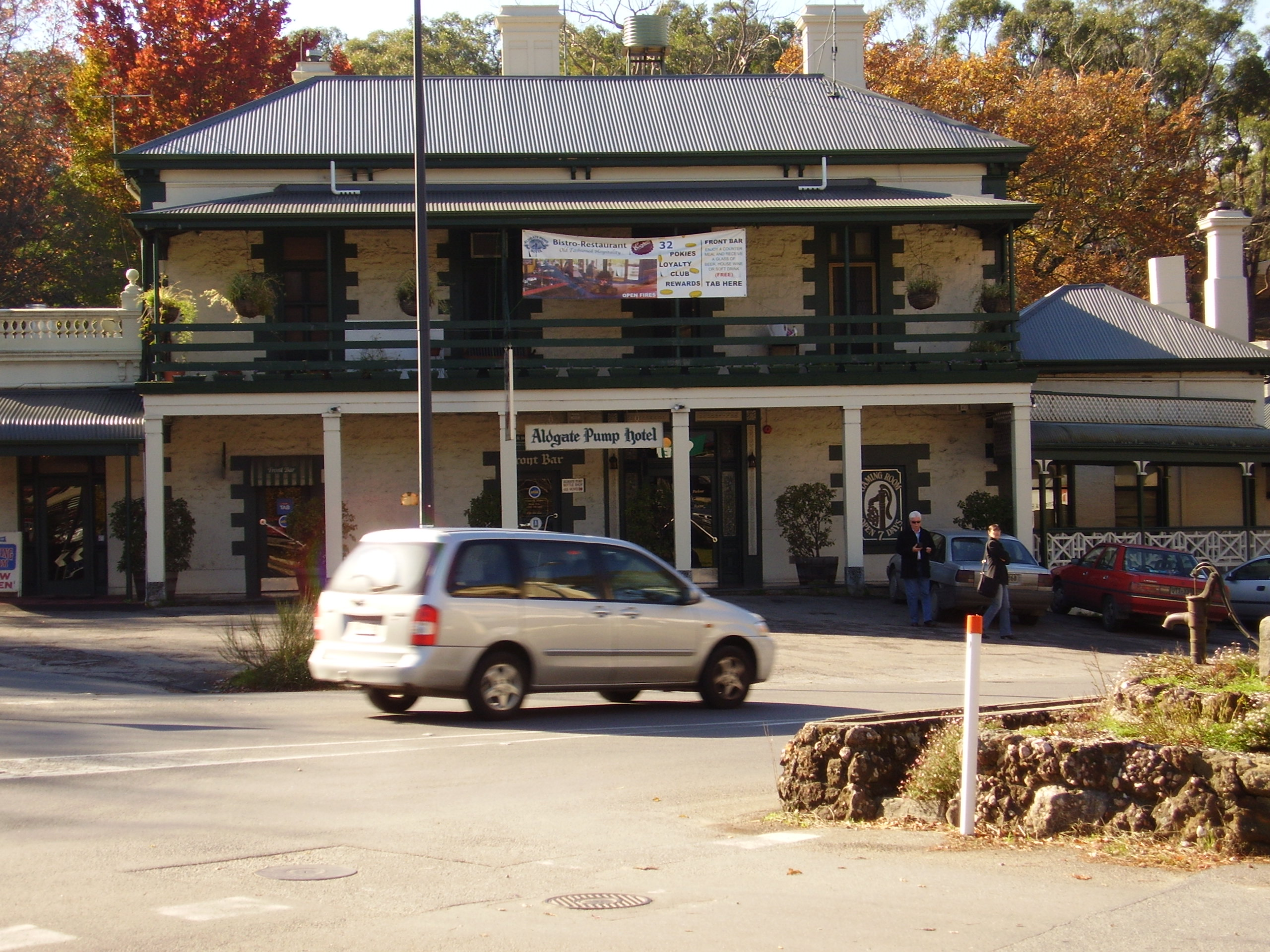
Aldgate Pump Hotel

Aldgate's drainage system has suffered substantial problems and has been the result of drastic flooding through the main street. One of the worst cases of this occurred at around 8:00AM on 8 November 2005, which left most of the businesses in the main street flooded with significant damage. A recent ongoing project around Aldgate has been upgrading the drainage system.

In 2009 and 2010, the intersection of Mount Barker Road, Strathalbyn Road and Kingsland Road in Aldgate was upgraded and streetscape works were carried out throughout the township. To make way for the roadworks, the pump which was the centrepoint of the town was temporarily removed. It was reinstalled in May 2011 by the Adelaide Hills Council and now sits atop a pedestal on the footpath in the main street.

A new fire station for the Aldgate Country Fire Service was completed in August 2009.

== Heritage listings ==
There are many locally and state heritage-listed sites in Aldgate. those listed in the South Australian Heritage Register:

- Aldgate Crafts Shop
- Aldgate Pump Hotel (see above)
- Raywood, formerly Arbury Park: dwelling (designed by Frank Kenneth Milne, commissioned by Sir Alexander Downer, listed 1989), garden, chapel, driveway and gates (listed 2000)
- Stangate House and Garden, bequeathed in 1975 to the National Trust of South Australia
- Wairoa, historic home and gardens occupied by Marbury School from 1972 to 2004, listed June 1989

== Industry ==
In January 1978 the State Transport Authority opened a bus depot on Mount Barker Road adjacent to Jibilla railway station. Today it is occuppied by SouthLink.

== Governance ==
Aldgate is in the Adelaide Hills Council local government area, the federal Division of Mayo and the state electoral district of Heysen.

== In popular culture ==
Aldgate is mentioned in the Redgum song "So Goodbye" featured on the band's 1978 album If You Don't Fight You Lose.
