= Mylor, South Australia =

Mylor
- Town
- Coordinates: 35°03′0″S 138°45′0″E
- Country: Australia
- State: South Australia
- Location: 5.3 km (3.3 mi) SSE of Aldgate; 24.7 km (15.3 mi) SE of Adelaide
- Established: 1891

Government
  - State electorate: Heysen
  - Federal division: Mayo

Population
  - Total: 1,067 (SAL 2021)
- Postcode: 5153
Localities around Mylor
Heathfield	Aldgate	Bridgewater
Scott Creek	Mylor	Hahndorf
Kangarilla	Jupiter Creek	Jupiter Creek

Mylor is a small town in the Adelaide Hills of South Australia.

== History ==
Mylor features a history of horticultural significance to South Australia, as demonstrated by the involvement of the Adelaide Botanic Gardens to determine the sustainability of fruits for commercial production in the Adelaide Hills, operating the Mylor Demonstration orchid from 1899 until 1930. Additionally, Mylor was the residence of George Goydor, who as Surveyor General of South Australia was responsible for the creation of the Goydor Line.

The area surrounding Mylor was first surveyed in 1885. Originally G.W. Cotton devised that the area be subdivided into farm plots through the Working Men's Blocks Scheme wherein white collar workers could improve the region through agricultural development. The town of Mylor was proclaimed in 1891 by the Acting Governor of South Australia, Sir James Boucaut naming it after his Cornish birthplace of Mylor.

The early history of Mylor is characterized by expansion, as highlighted by the Mylor Primary School (1894), general store (1895), and community hall (1896). The original European inhabitants of Mylor were strict Methodists, and due to their religious temperance, no pub has ever been established within the town.

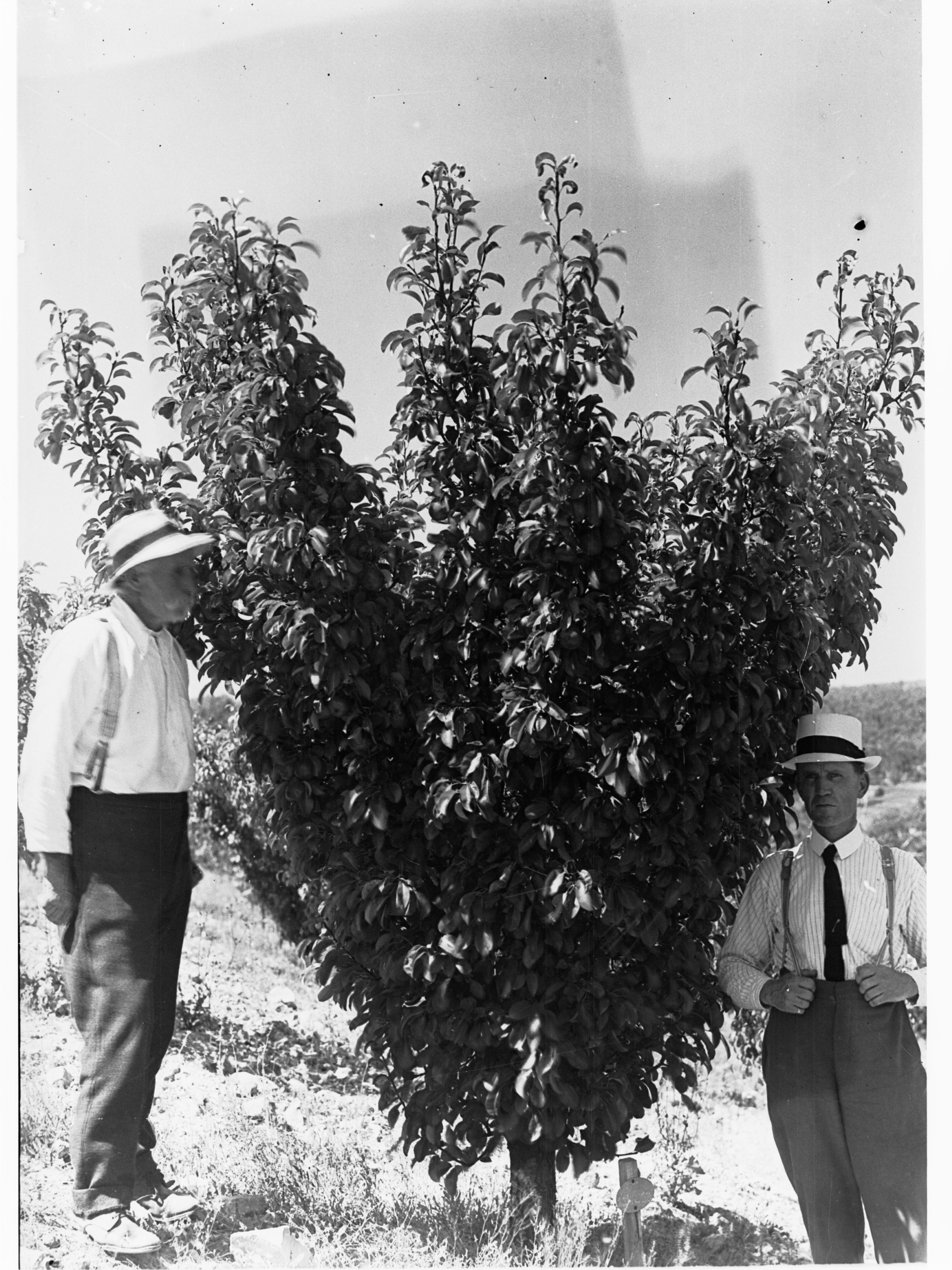
Fruit tree at Mylor Orchard about 1925.

== Current ==
Mylor Country Markers occur on the first Sunday of every month, on Mylor Oval. Mylor is a popular camping area, with many camps. Mylor Main Street hosts a large Hardware/Rural store (called Coopers), General Store, Post Office, and Cafe (Verte Kitchen). There is also a Primary School, Fire Brigade, Uniting Church and Anglican Church. Mylor features an Oval that is used for Cricket and Soccer as well as Community Events and general use.

== Mylor Country Fire Service ==
Mylor CFS
Operational area
- Country: Australia
- State: South Australia
- Village: Mylor

Agency overview
- Established: 1935

Website
- Official website

Mylor Country Fire Service is the volunteer fire service of Mylor. Mylor CFS is one of the oldest brigades in the region, and pride themselves in being well trained and professional. They are part of the Mount Lofty CFS Group, which is part of the Country Fire Service

== Demographics ==
At the 2021 Census, Mylor had a population of 1,067 residents. with 50% male, and 50% female. The median age was 47. The town had 0.3% of its population identify as Aboriginal or Torres Strait Islander. Common ancestries included English (50.3%), Australian (37.7%), and Scottish (8.4%).

Most residents were born in Australia (77.2%). Religiously, "No religion" was reported by 54.4%, followed by Catholic (9.7%), Not Stated (8.7%), and Anglican (8.3%).

== See also ==
- Mylor Conservation Park
- Warrawong Sanctuary
