= Bridgewater, South Australia =

Bridgewater South Australia
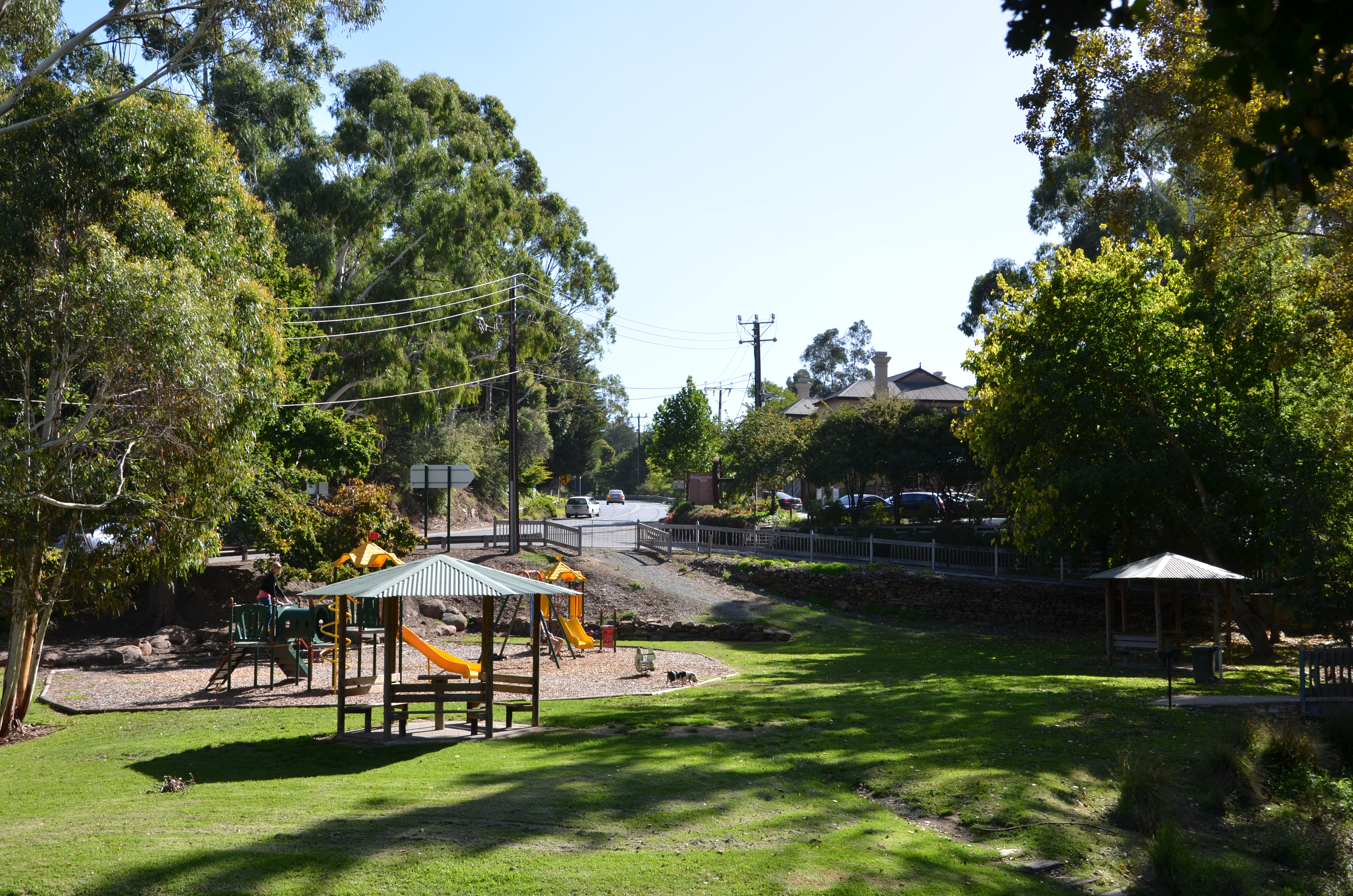
- Park near Bridgewater Mill

- Coordinates: 35°00′59″S 138°46′05″E
- Population: 3,719 (SAL 2021)
- Postcode(s): 5155
- Elevation: 398 m (1,306 ft)(railway station)
- LGA(s): Adelaide Hills Council; District Council of Mount Barker
- Region: Adelaide Hills
- County: Adelaide
- State electorate(s): Heysen
- Federal division(s): Mayo
Localities around Bridgewater:
Aldgate; Mount George	Mount George	Verdun
Aldgate	Bridgewater	Verdun; Hahndorf
Aldgate	Mylor; Hahndorf	Hahndorf
- Footnotes: Adjoining suburbs

Bridgewater is a town in South Australia, located in the Adelaide Hills to the south-east of the Adelaide city centre.

It is the former end of the Adelaide-Bridgewater railway line; this route was closed in 1987. The railway was converted to standard gauge in 1995 and continues to be the main line from Adelaide to Melbourne, but no trains stop at the now demolished Bridgewater railway station.

A portion of the Heysen walking trail runs through the town, as well as the Pioneer Women's walking trail.

== History ==
The origin of the name "Bridgewater" for the town is unclear. Early European settlement in the area resulted in a village, Cox's creek, at a point where bullock teams crossed Cox Creek (named after the explorer Robert Cock, who led an expedition through this area in December 1837).

An early use of the name "Bridgewater" was in James Addison's (c. 1819 – 26 April 1870) "Bridgewater Hotel", and the town was renamed Bridgewater when the adjacent flour mill was built by John Dunn and the nearby land subdivided in 1857.

Another potential origin of the name is from the first postmaster, William Radford, who claimed responsibility due to a successful petition in 1873 to change the post office's name from Cox's creek to Bridgewater.

== Street names ==
The streets of one part of Bridgewater were named for Orient Steam Navigation Company ("Orient Line") steam ships: SS Omrah (1899–1918), RMS Ophir (1891–1922), SS Orontes (1902–1926), SS Orotava (1889–1921) (though Oratava Street), SS Orsova (1909–1936), SS Orvieto (1909–1931), SS Osterley (1909–1929), SS Otranto (1909–1918), and SS Otway (1909–1917).
