= Bridgewater railway line =

Part of railway line through the Adelaide Hills, South Australia

Overview
- Status: Suburban passenger service ceased
- Locale: Adelaide, South Australia
- Termini: Adelaide; Bridgewater
- Stations: 28

Service
- Type: Commuter rail
- Operator: State Transport Authority

History
- Opened: 1883
- Closed: 26 July 1987

Technical
- Line length: 37.3 km (23.2 mi)
- Number of tracks: When service closed: 2 (Adelaide to Belair); 1 (to Bridgewater)
- Track gauge: When service closed: 1600 mm (5 ft 3 in)

The Bridgewater railway line was the name given to part of the "South line", the westernmost component of the Adelaide–Melbourne railway line, built in 1883 through the Adelaide Hills. The term was applied in connection with South Australian Railways suburban passenger services – and some freight services – from the capital city, Adelaide, to Bridgewater railway station. In 1987, poor patronage led to the services being curtailed 15.7 kilometres (9.8 miles) to Belair and the line was consequently renamed the Belair line.

== Services ==
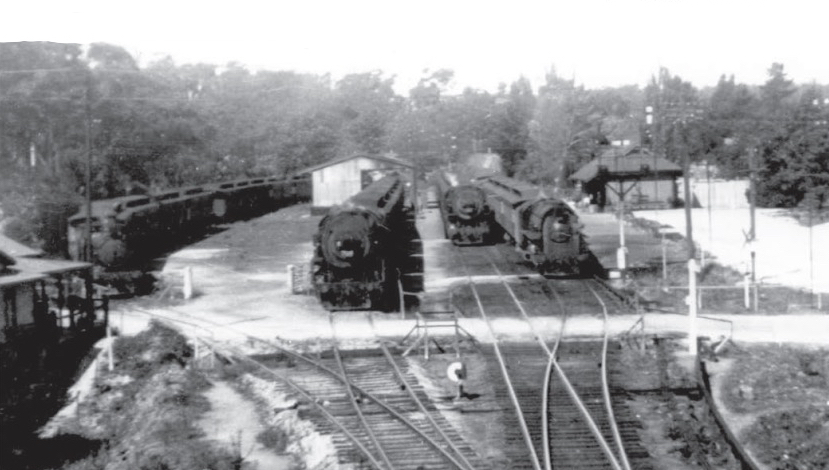
In circa 1938, Bridgewater's yard is the busy terminus of passenger services in the Adelaide Hills. On the left are three trains that will proceed in turn to the capital; on the right a train from a country destination goes through.

Initially, services on the Bridgewater line were provided by trains hauled by locomotives – in the first half of the 20th century usually F class; from 1924 Brill railcars; from 1956 to 1980 Red Hen railcars; and 2000 class railcars in the final 7 years. Services ran from Adelaide with trains along the line terminating either at Belair or Bridgewater. On special occasions after 1987, such as the Oakbank Easter Racing Carnival held every Easter weekend at Oakbank, trains ran further east to terminate at Balhannah. However, this service ceased before the standard gauge conversion because of the expense of operating the Balhannah branch line.

Much of the line is steep, with an abundance of curves of 200 metres (10 chains) radius which, when combined with 1 in 45 (2 per cent) uncompensated grades, is equivalent to a grade of 1 in 37. Beyond Belair, the line continues to be single track. Crossing loops located at Belair, Long Gully, Mount Lofty, Aldgate and Bridgewater.

Services from Adelaide to Bridgewater usually took an average of one hour (stopping all stations), and about 50 minutes (express). Only one train every two hours operated during off-peak periods and weekends, most terminating at Belair, and no more than two trains per hour in either direction during peak hours.

=== Closure and legacy ===
When the more direct South Eastern Freeway replaced the previous winding main road through the Adelaide Hills in the late 1960s, rail patronage to Bridgewater declined heavily: the steep, winding route was uncompetitive with the new freeway. In 1985, the State Transport Authority sought to have the service withdrawn. At that time, the line had 12 services on weekdays, 9 on Saturdays and 5 on Sundays. On 26 July 1987, passenger services to Bridgewater were withdrawn. There followed an evaluation of the service by the federal Bureau of Transport Economics, which demonstrated the highly unprofitable nature of the line. Despite prolonged public agitation, the service was never reinstated. However, the public furore ensured the retention of services to Belair, which remains financially the worst performing of Adelaide's rail services. Closure of three stations on the line to permit operation on a single track after standardisation caused a similar public outcry, despite the existence of parallel bus services nearby.

In 1995, the Adelaide-Wolseley railway line was converted from broad gauge (1600mm) to standard gauge (1435 mm), ruling out any restoration of Adelaide commuter trains to Bridgewater and beyond.

Between Goodwood and Belair, the former double track route became two parallel single lines, one broad gauge for suburban services (owned by the state government), the other standard gauge for interstate and freight services (owned by the federal government). Along with this conversion, stations on the Belair line at Mile End Goods, Millswood (reopened in 2014), Hawthorn and Clapham closed; the other Belair line stations each had one platform closed.

=== Line guide ===
(Note: dates are those that are indicated in each individual article)

Station	Image	Opened	Additional information
Bridgewater		1880s	Terminus 1857–1987; closed 23 September 1987
Carripook		?	Closed 23 September 1987
Jibilla		?	Originally named Halliday's Crossing; closed 23 September 1987
Aldgate		14 March 1883	Closed 23 September 1987; crossing loop closed 1995
Madurta		?	Closed 23 September 1987
Heathfield		?	Closed 23 September 1987
Mount Lofty		1883	Closed 23 September 1987; crossing loop closed 1995
Upper Sturt		?	Closed 23 September 1987
Nalawort		1920s	Closed 12 December 1945
Long Gully		?	Closed 23 September 1987; crossing loop closed 1995
National Park		?	Closed 23 September 1987
Belair		1883	Terminus of the Belair line (1987–present); crossing loop closed 1995
See Belair railway line for intermediate stations between Belair and Adelaide Station
Adelaide railway station		1856	

== See also ==
Belair railway line
