= Belair railway station =

Railway station in Adelaide, South Australia

Belair
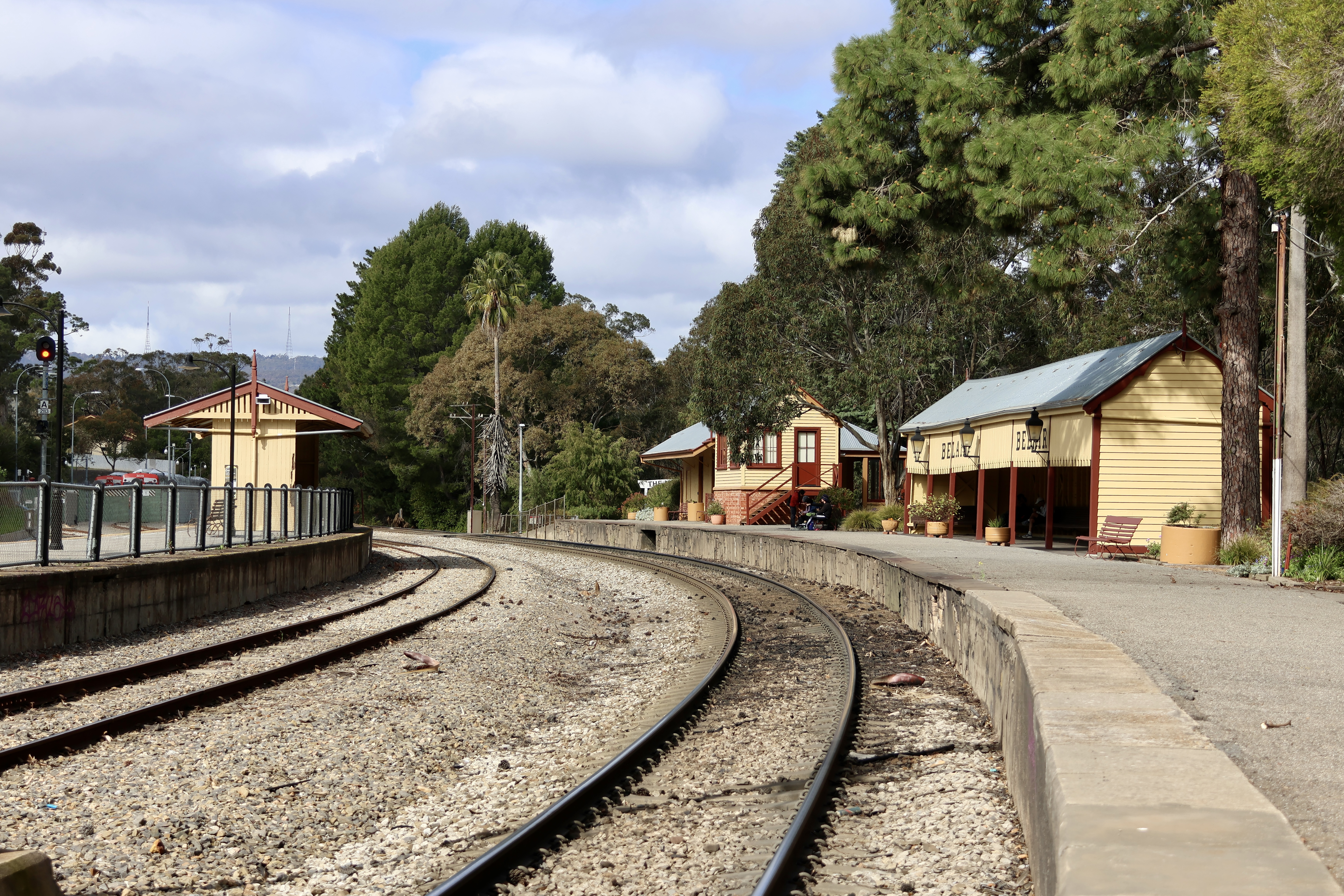
- Eastbound view in 2025

General information
- Location: Sheoak Road, Belair
- Coordinates: 34°59′53″S 138°37′59″E
- Owner: Department for Infrastructure and Transport
- Operator: Adelaide Metro
- Line: Belair
- Distance: 21.5 km from Adelaide
- Platforms: 3 (2 disused)
- Bus routes: 195 & 195F to Blackwood; 892 & 893 to Aldgate & Blackwood; 674 to Adelaide (School Bus Route)
- Connections: Bus

Construction
- Structure type: Ground
- Parking: Yes
- Cycle facilities: No
- Accessible: Yes

History
- Opened: 1883

Services
Preceding station	Adelaide Metro	Following station
Pinera towards Adelaide	Belair line	Terminus
Preceding station	Australian Rail Track Corporation	Following station
Pinera towards Adelaide	Adelaide–Wolseley railway line	National Park towards Serviceton
Location

Belair railway station is located on the Adelaide to Melbourne line in the Adelaide southern foothills suburb of Belair, 21.5 kilometres from Adelaide station. It is the terminus for Adelaide Metro's Belair line service.

== History ==
Belair station opened in 1883 with the opening of the Adelaide to Aldgate section of the Adelaide-Melbourne line. Belair is a scenic location on the edge of the Belair National Park and the station has a number of historic preserved buildings. In past years, many people travelled by train to Belair at weekends to enjoy the adjacent National Park. The large 1890s vintage wooden shelter on the main platform was built for these crowds. There were other facilities at the station such as a refreshment room, now long gone. Parts of the heritage station were destroyed by an arsonist in May 2003. The building is currently being rebuilt with special materials. There are also a number of stabling sidings for storing passenger trains overnight.(Used for peak hours terminating trains)

Until 1987, the Bridgewater line carried suburban trains further into the Adelaide Hills as far as the town of Bridgewater. The Bridgewater trains were withdrawn in 1987, attributed to the high cost of operation and low passenger numbers. Platform 2 was used to terminate some suburban trains for a while after the closure of the line. Stations beyond Belair were closed and all suburban trains now terminate at platform 1 at Belair. That being said, there are plans to reopen this again. In 1995, the Adelaide to Melbourne line was converted to standard gauge. This prevented any restoration of local trains to Bridgewater or beyond. Between Goodwood and Belair, the former double track route became two parallel single lines, one broad gauge for Adelaide Metro services, and the former Adelaide bound track was converted to standard gauge for interstate freight.

== Services by platforms ==
Platform	Destination	Notes
1	Adelaide/Belair	
2	Not in Passenger Use	Now using for Belair Loop (Adelaide-Wolseley railway line)
3	Not in Passenger Use	Now using for Belair Loop (Adelaide-Wolseley railway line) (Highly used)

== Transport links ==
Bus transfers: Stop 25 Upper Sturt Rd - West side (Stop Code: 14701)
Route no.	Destination & route details
195	Blackwood Interchange to City
195F	Blackwood Interchange to City
893	Aldgate to Blackwood
674	Blackwood High School to City

Bus transfers: Stop 25 Upper Sturt Rd - East side (Stop Code: 14700)
Route no.	Destination & route details
195	Blackwood Interchange to City
195F	Blackwood Interchange to City
892	Urrbrae to Aldgate
