= Bridgewater railway station, South Australia =

Former railway station in South Australia, Australia

Bridgewater
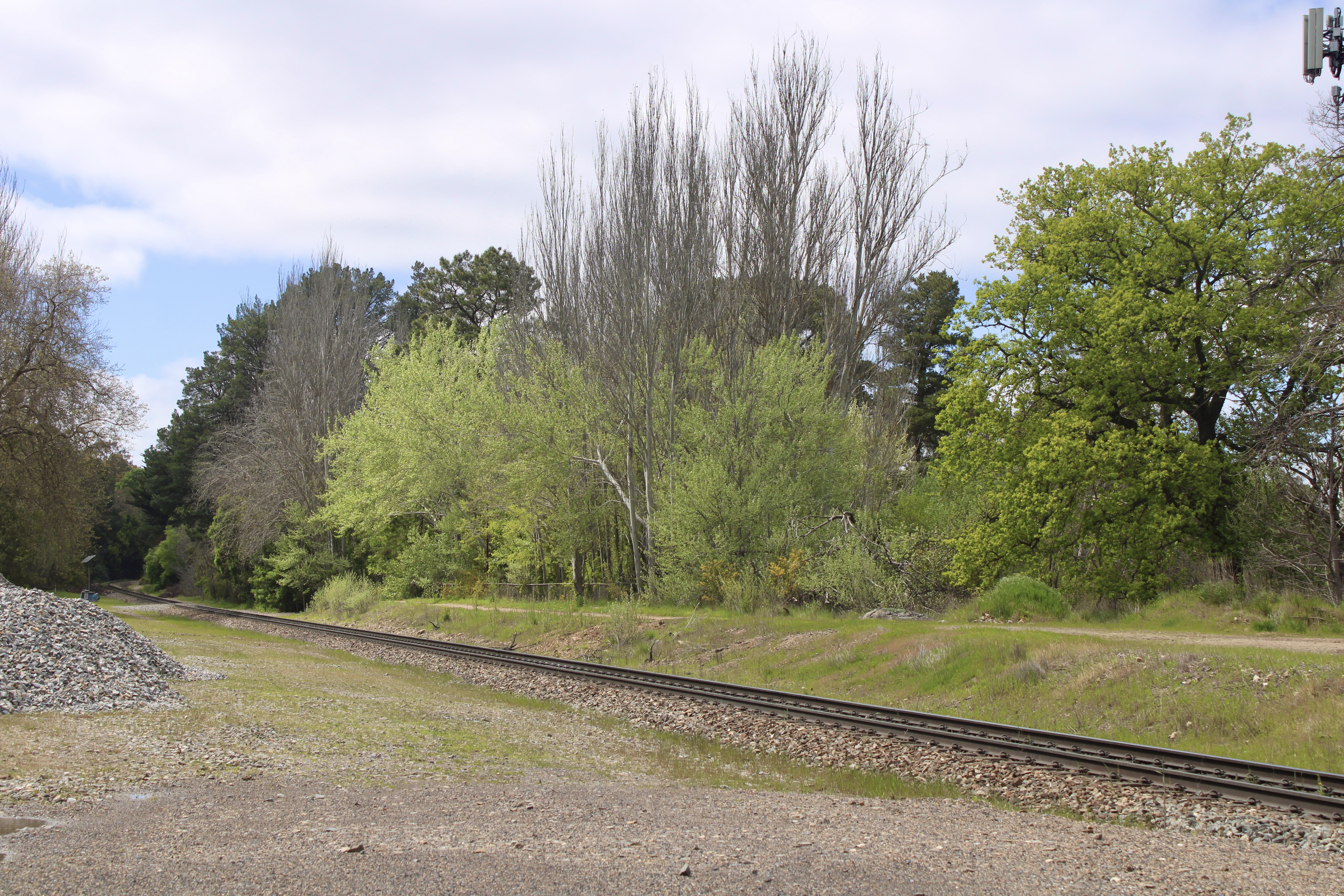
- The former Bridgewater railway station site in October 2021.

General information
- Location: Mill Road, Bridgewater
- Coordinates: 35.0083°S 138.7603°E
- Operator: State Transport Authority
- Line: Adelaide-Wolseley
- Distance: 37.66 kilometres from Adelaide
- Platforms: 1
- Tracks: 1

Construction
- Structure type: Ground

Other information
- Status: Closed

History
- Closed: 23 September 1987

Services
Preceding station	TransAdelaide	Following station
Carripook towards Adelaide	Bridgewater line	Terminus
Preceding station	Australian Rail Track Corporation	Following station
Carripook towards Adelaide	Adelaide–Wolseley railway line	Yantaringa towards Serviceton
Location

Bridgewater railway station was located on the Bridgewater line, serving the Adelaide Hills suburb of Bridgewater. It was located 37.6 km from Adelaide station.

== History ==
Bridgewater station opened in the 1880s and was the terminus of the now defunct Bridgewater line. The station consisted of three platforms. Platform 1 was a side platform that was 140 metres long, and platforms 2 and 3 were an island platform 170 metres long. On 1 March 1978, the station became the eastern boundary of the State Transport Authority network.

The station building on the main platform was burned down by arsonists in 1983. The station closed on 23 September 1987, when the State Transport Authority withdrew services on the route between Belair and Bridgewater. The offices and island platform were demolished around 1990, while the brick relay console and main platform were demolished in November 2006. A small part of the platform fencing, light poles, and the dirt mound that formed platform 1 are all that remain of the station.
