= David Davies =

David Davies may refer to:

== Politics ==
- David Davies (industrialist) (1818–1890), also known as David Davies Llandinam, MP for Cardigan, 1874–1885, and Cardiganshire, 1885–1886
- David Davies (Australian politician) (1839–1894), politician in colonial Victoria, Australia
- David Davies (textile merchant) (1852–1934), Liberal politician, MP for Denbigh 1918–1922
- Sir David Davies (dairyman) (1870–1958), Conservative politician
- David Lewis Davies (1873–1937), British member of parliament for Pontypridd, 1931–1937
- Dai Davies (trade unionist) (1909–1998), Labour Party official and general secretary of the ISTC
- Dai Davies (politician) (born 1959), independent member of the UK parliament for Blaenau Gwent, 2006–2010
- David TC Davies (born 1970), Welsh Conservative politician and member of the UK parliament, 2005–2024
- David Richard Seaborne Davies (1904–1984), Welsh legal academic, briefly a British Liberal Party member of parliament in 1945
- David Arthur Saunders Davies (1792–1857), British member of parliament for Carmarthenshire
- David Davies, 1st Baron Davies (1880–1944) Welsh Liberal member of parliament for Montgomeryshire from 1906 to 1929

== Arts, entertainment and journalism ==
=== Music ===
- David Davies (composer) (1810–1875), Welsh composer of "Glan'rafon"
- David Davies (harpist) (1817–1855), Welsh harpist
- David Ffrangcon-Davies (1855–1918), Welsh operatic baritone
- Ivor Novello (David Ivor Davies, 1893–1951), Welsh composer and actor
- Dave Davies (born 1947), British musician with the Kinks
- David Davies (musician) (born 1954), British flautist, conductor and composer
- David Lloyd Davies (died 1881), Welsh singer and poet

=== Television and theater ===
- David Thomas Davies (1876–1962), Welsh dramatist
- David Joshua Davies (1877–1945), Welsh dramatist
- David Davies (Welsh actor) (1906–1974), Welsh actor
- David Stuart Davies (1946–2024), editor, writer, and playwright
- David Davies (English actor)

=== Other artists ===
- David Davies (author) (1741–1819), Welsh author
- David Davies (artist) (1864–1939), Australian artist
- David John Davies (1870–?), Welsh painter
- Dave Davies (reporter) (born 1953), American reporter for the Philadelphia Daily News and radio host on WHYY
- David Martin Davies (born c. 1960s), American journalist and broadcaster based and born in Texas

== Sportsmen ==
=== Association football (soccer) ===
- David Davies (footballer, born 1879) (1879–1956), Brecon F.C., Hereford Town F.C. and Wales international footballer
- David Davies (footballer, born 1888) (1888–1966), Oldham Athletic F.C. and Wales international footballer
- David Davies (football administrator) (born 1948), former executive director of the (English) Football Association
- Dai Davies (footballer, born 1948) (1948–2021), Everton F.C., Wrexham A.F.C. and Wales international goalkeeper

=== Rugby ===
- David Bailey Davies (1884–1968), Welsh rugby union fullback
- David Harris Davies (1877–1944), rugby union footballer of the 1900s for Wales, Tonna, Neath, Glamorgan Police, and Glamorgan
- Dai Davies (sportsman) (1880–1944), rugby union, rugby league, and association footballer for Llanelli (RU), Wales (RL), Swinton, Wales (soccer) and Bolton Wanderers
- W. J. A. Davies (1890–1967), known as Dave Davies, rugby union footballer, captained England in the 1920s
- David Davies (rugby league), footballer of the 1900s, and 1910s for Wales, Merthyr Tydfil, Swinton, and Oldham
- David Davies (rugby league, born 1902) (1902–1992), rugby league footballer of the 1920s, and 1930s for Wales, and Broughton, Warrington, Huddersfield and Keighley
- David Davies (rugby league, born c. 1915), rugby league footballer of the 1930s, and 1940s for Wales, and Salford
- David Idwal Davies (rugby) (1915–1990), rugby union and rugby league footballer of the 1930s, and 1940s for Wales (RU), Swansea, Wales (RL), and Leeds
- Dai Davies (rugby union, born 1925) (1925–2003), rugby union footballer of the 1940s, and 1950s for British Lions, Wales, Penygraig, Somerset Police, British Police, Somerset, and Barbarian F.C.
- John Davies (rugby, born 1941) (David John Davies, 1941–1969), rugby union and rugby league footballer of the 1960s for Wales (RU), Neath, and Leeds (RL)

=== Other sports ===
- Dai Davies (cricketer) (1896–1976), first-class cricketer for Glamorgan and Wales, and Test umpire
- David Davies (swimmer) (born 1985), British long-distance swimmer

== Sciences ==
- David Davies (electrical engineer) (1935–2025), professor of electrical engineering at UCL; MoD Chief Scientific Adviser, 1993–1999
- David Christopher Davies (1827–1885), geologist and mining engineer
- David G. Davies, microbiologist and associate professor at Binghamton University
- David Davies (public health official), first Medical Officer of Health for Bristol

== Religion ==
- David Davies (archdeacon of Llandaff) (1858–1930), Welsh clergyman
- David Davies (Baptist minister) (1800–1856)
- David Davies (Dean of Wellington) (1912–1987), Welsh clergyman in New Zealand
- David Davies (Independent minister and magazine editor) (died 1807), Welsh editor of "Y Geirgrawn"
- David Davies (Welsh priest) (1742–1819), Welsh clergyman in the Church of England
- David Charles Davies (1826–1891), nonconformist clergyman
- David Christopher Davies (missionary) (1878–1958), Welsh representative of the Baptist Missionary Society
- David Edwardes Davies (1879–1950), Anglican bishop of Bangor
- D. Jacob Davies (1917–1974), Welsh Unitarian minister
- David Stephen Davies (1841–1898), Welsh writer, preacher, and colonist
- David Tegfan Davies (1883–1968), Welsh Congregational minister
- David Richard Davies (1889–1958), Christian minister and writer

== Peers ==
- David Davies, 1st Baron Davies (1880–1944), Liberal MP for Montgomeryshire 1906–1929, grandson of the industrialist David Davies (see above)
- David Davies, 2nd Baron Davies (1915–1944), major in the Royal Welch Fusiliers
- David Davies, 3rd Baron Davies (1940–2024), British peer and engineer
- David Garfield Davies, Baron Davies of Coity (1935–2019), British peer and trade union leader

== Others ==
- David Davies (Dai'r Cantwr) (1812–1874), Welsh activist sentenced for his part in the Rebecca Riots
- David Davies (physician) (1792–1865), Welsh physician
- David Gwerfyl Davies (1913–1977), Welsh organist and composer
- David James Davies (1893–1956), Welsh economist, industrialist, political activist and internationalist
- David Percy Davies (1891–1946), Welsh newspaper editor
- David Davies (test pilot) (1920–2003), British test pilot

== See also ==
- David Davis (disambiguation), pronounced the same way
- Dai Davies (disambiguation)
- Davies, surname
