= Kenneth Stirling Conservation Park =

Protected area in South Australia

- IUCN category III (natural monument or feature)
- Location within South Australia
- Location: South Australia
- Nearest city: Adelaide
- Coordinates: 34°58′S 138°47′E
- Area: 2.44 km^{2} (0.94 sq mi)
- Established: 13 December 1990
- Governing body: Department for Environment and Water
- Website: Official website

Kenneth Stirling Conservation Park is a protected area in the Australian state of South Australia consisting of five parcels of land located in the gazetted localities of Balhannah, Basket Range, Carey Gully, Forest Range and Mount George about 18 kilometres (11 mi) east of the state capital of Adelaide. With a total combined size of 253 ha, the park is an excellent example of the eucalyptus woodland that once dominated the high-rainfall regions of the Southern Mount Lofty Ranges.

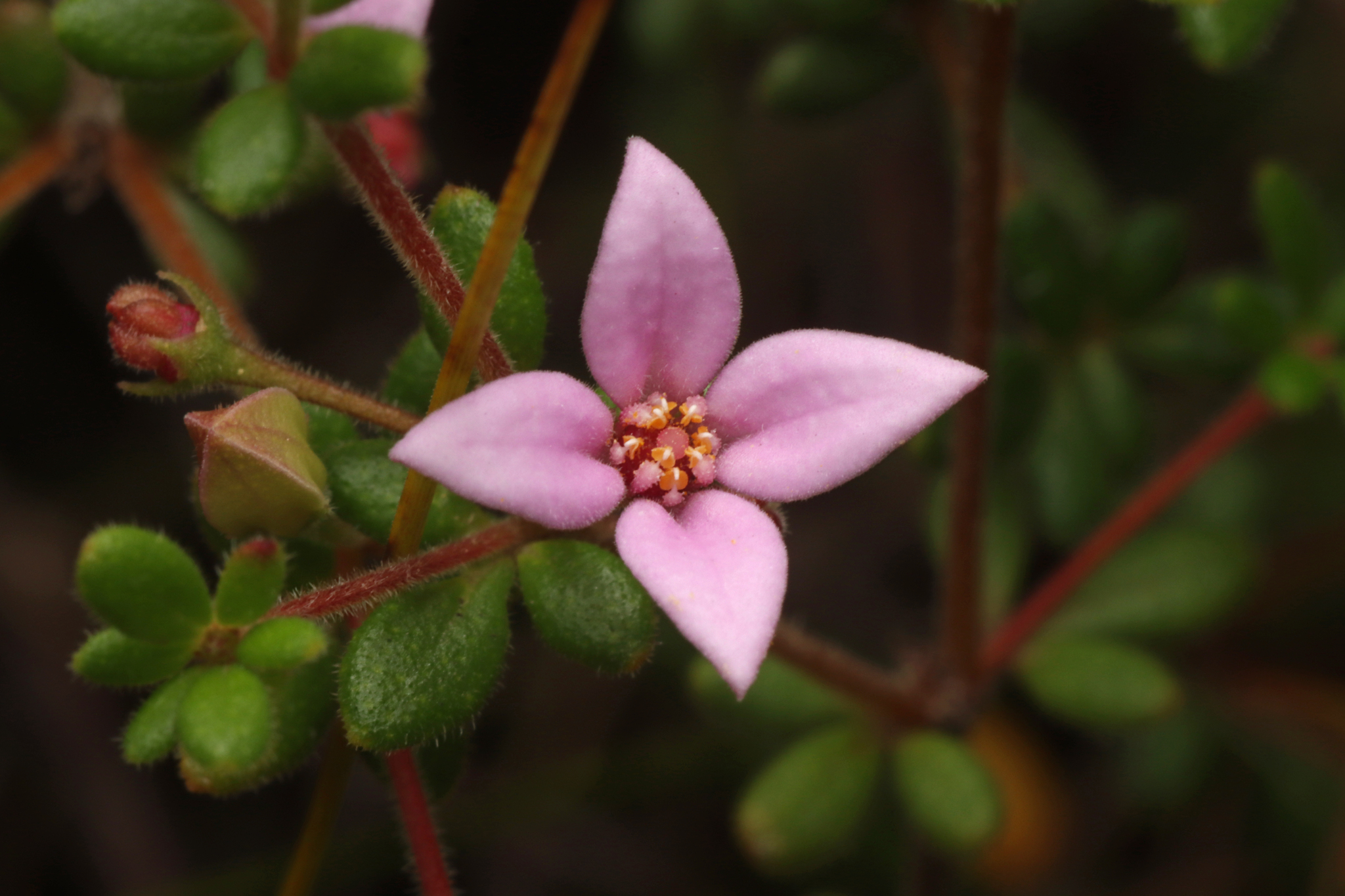
Boronia edwardsii can be found in the park, and features in the Friends of Kenneth Stirling Park logo.

The park conserves open forest and open woodland formations of stringybark (Eucalyptus obliqua and Eucalyptus baxteri) with candlebark (Eucalyptus dalrympleana) and manna or white gum (Eucalyptus viminalis) on the lower slopes. Due to changes in land usage since European settlement, and the subsequent clearance of high-rainfall land in the Southern Mount Lofty Ranges, many of the species found in the park are now considered locally rare or uncommon. Examples of these remnant high-rainfall species are the pink boronia Boronia edwardsii and the velvet worm Mantonipatus persiculus.

The conservation park was constituted under the National Parks and Wildlife Act 1972 on 13 December 1990 in respect to several parcels of land in the cadastral unit of the Hundred of Onkaparinga.

It was named after Kenneth Stirling who was “a major donor to the preservation of native vegetation in South Australia”.

As of 2002, access to the conservation park for the purpose of mining exploration under the Mining Act 1971 was not permitted.

The conservation park is classified as an IUCN Category III protected area. It was listed on the now-defunct Register of the National Estate after late 1994.

== See also ==
- Protected areas of South Australia
