= Mount George =

Mount George may refer to:

- Mount George (Antarctica), one of the Scott Mountains
- Mount George, South Australia, a locality north of Bridgewater in the Adelaide Hills Council
  - Mount George Conservation Park, a protected area in Mount George, South Australia
- Mount George, New South Wales, a town in the City of Greater Taree, Australia
- Mount George (West Coast), on the South Island, New Zealand

== See also ==
- George Mount (born 1955), American Olympic and professional cyclist
- Mount George Davis, a mountain in California, USA
