= George Davis =

George Davis may refer to:

== Entertainment ==
- George Davis (actor) (1889–1965), Dutch-born American actor
- George Davis (art director) (1914–1998), American art director
- George Davis (author) (1939), American novelist
- George Davis (editor) (1906–1957), American fiction editor and minor novelist
- George S. Davis (1906–1992), aka The Singing Miner, American country singer

== Military ==
- George Andrew Davis Jr. (1920–1952), United States Air Force major and Medal of Honor recipient
- George B. Davis (1847–1914), Judge Advocate General of the United States Army
- George E. Davis (Medal of Honor) (1839–1926), American Civil War officer and Medal of Honor recipient
- George Fleming Davis (1911–1945), U.S. Navy commander, Medal of Honor recipient
- George Whitefield Davis (1839–1918), American general and military Governor of Puerto Rico
- George W. Davis, Jr. (1933–2024), Vice Admiral in the United States Navy
- George W. Davis VI (born 1938), U.S. Navy rear admiral

== Politics ==
- George Davis (American politician) (1820–1896), 4th Attorney General of the Confederate States
- George Davis (Australian politician) (1833–1896), Victorian Legislative Council member, Minister of Defence
- George Davis (New Zealand politician) (1873–1937), New Zealand trade unionist and local body politician
- George Allen Davis (1857–1920), New York state senator
- George Martley Davis (1860–1938), Australian politician
- George R. Davis (New York politician) (1788–1867), Speaker of the New York State Assembly 1831 and 1843
- George R. Davis (Illinois politician) (1840–1899), U.S. Representative from Illinois
- George T. Davis (1810–1877), U.S. Representative from Massachusetts

== Sports ==
- George Davis (baseball) (1870–1940), American baseball player and manager
- George Davis (footballer, born 1881) (1881–1969), England international footballer
- George Davis (footballer, born 1868), English footballer
- Iron Davis (George Allen Davis, 1890–1961), American baseball pitcher
- George Davis (rugby union), American rugby union player, gold medallist at the 1920 Summer Olympics
- Mark Davis (fisherman) (George Mark Davis, born 1963), bass fisherman
- George Davis IV (born 1987), American soccer player

== Other ==
- George Lawrence Davis (1830–1894), English Christian missionary
- George E. Davis (1850–1907), British founding father of chemical engineering
- George E. Davis (educator) (1862–1959), American professor and, school organizer
- George Francis Davis (1883–1947), New Zealand born industrialist in Australia
- George Russell Davis (1861–1933), American jurist on the Arizona Territorial Supreme Court
- George Davis (robber) (born 1941), British armed robber
- George Harold Davis (born 1958), American spree killer
- George Roscoe Davis, Washington, D.C. lawyer
- George Davis House (Toronto), a designated house in Toronto
- Mount George Davis, a mountain in California

== See also ==
- George Davies (disambiguation)
- George Davys (1780–1864), tutor to Queen Victoria and bishop
- Georgie Davis (born 1969), artist name of Kees Rietveld, Dutch singer
