= David Davis =

David or Dave Davis may refer to:

== Arts and entertainment ==
- David Montague Davis (1853–1932), British choirmaster
- David Davis (broadcaster) (1908–1996), British radio executive and broadcaster, head of the BBC's Children's Hour
- David Stratton Davis (1917–2000), English architect
- David Davis (TV producer) (1937–2022), American television producer
- David Davis (bluegrass) (1961–2024), American mandolinist and singer
- JD Davis (a.k.a. Dave Davis, born 1973), Belgian musician
- Dave Davis (actor) (born 1989), American actor
- Dave Davis (musician), American trombonist for Sun Ra Arkestra

== Politics and law ==
=== United States ===
- David Davis (Supreme Court justice) (1815–1886), American Supreme Court justice and U.S. senator
- David Floyd Davis (1867–1951), American oil businessman and politician
- David J. Davis (1870–1942), American politician, lieutenant governor of Pennsylvania
- D. W. Davis (David William Davis, 1873–1959), American politician, governor of Idaho
- David Jackson Davis (1878–1938), U.S. federal judge
- David Davis IV (1906–1978), American lawyer and politician
- David Davis (Tennessee politician) (born 1959), American politician, U.S. representative from Tennessee

=== Other countries ===
- David Davis (New South Wales politician) (1854–1927), Australian politician, member of the New South Wales Legislative Assembly
- David Davis (lord mayor of Birmingham) (1859–1938), British politician, first Jewish lord mayor of Birmingham, England
- David Davis (British politician) (born 1948), British member of Parliament, Secretary of State for Exiting the European Union
- David Davis (Australian politician) (born 1962), Australian politician, member of the Victorian Legislative Council

== Sports ==
- David Davis (cricketer) (1902–1995), New Zealand cricketer and judge
- Dave Davis (shot putter) (born 1937), United States national shot-put champion
- Dave Davis (bowler) (1942–2022), American tenpin bowler
- Dave Davis (American football) (born 1948), American football player
- David Davis (handballer) (born 1976), Spanish handball player
- David Davis (footballer) (born 1991), English association football player

== Others ==
- David Davis (Castellhywel) (1745–1827), Welsh minister and poet
- David Daniel Davis (1777–1841), British physician
- David Davis, Blaengwawr, (1797–1866) Australian industrialist, leading figure in the South Wales coal industry
- David Davis, Maesyffynnon (coal owner) (1821–1884), Australian industrialist, son of David Davis, Blaengwawr
- David E. Davis (ecologist) (1913–1994), American ecologist and animal behaviorist
- David Brion Davis (1927–2019), American historian of slavery and abolitionism
- David E. Davis (1930–2011), American automotive journalist
- Albert Johnson Walker (a.k.a. David W. Davis, born 1946), Canadian murderer

== Other uses ==
- David Davis Mansion, historic home in Bloomington, Illinois, U.S.

== See also ==
- David Davies (disambiguation)
- David Davis Walker (1840–1918), American merchant, a first cousin of Justice Davis
