= George Davies =

George Davies may refer to:

- George Davies (athlete) (born 1940), American pole vaulter
- George Davies (baseball) (1868–1906), American major league pitcher
- George Davies (cricketer) (1892–1957), Australian cricketer
- George Davies (footballer, born 1897) (1897–1956), English footballer in the 1920s
- George Davies (footballer, born 1900) (1900–1942), English footballer in the 1920s
- George Davies (footballer, born 1916) (1916-1980), English footballer in the 1930s and 1940s, see List of Bury F.C. players (25–99 appearances)
- George Davies (footballer, born 1927) (1927–2025), English footballer in the 1950s
- George Davies (footballer, born 1996) (born 1996), Sierra Leonean footballer in the 2010s
- George Davies (politician) (1875–1950), British Member of Parliament
- George Davies (retailer) (born 1941), British fashion retailer
- George Davies (rugby union) (1875–1959), Welsh international rugby player
- George M. Ll. Davies (1880–1949), British member of parliament
- George Llewelyn Davies (1893–1915), with his brothers the inspiration for playwright J. M. Barrie's characters of Peter Pan and the Lost Boys
- George Christopher Davies (1849–1922), "The Man Who Found the Broads"
- George Alfred Davies (1846–1897), mayor of Fremantle, Australia
- John George Davies (1846–1913), generally known as (Sir) George Davies, a Tasmanian politician, newspaper proprietor and cricketer

== See also ==
- George Davys (1780–1864), tutor to Queen Victoria and bishop
- George Davis (disambiguation)
