= George Lawrence =

George Lawrence may refer to:

- George Alfred Lawrence (1827–1876), British novelist and barrister
- George Lawrence (painter) (1901–1981), Australian painter
- George Lawrence (politician) (1857–1924), Manitoba MLA and cabinet minister
- George Lawrence (footballer, born 1889) (1889–1959), former professional footballer with Derby County F.C.
- George Lawrence (footballer, born 1962), former professional footballer with Southampton F.C. and A.F.C. Bournemouth
- George Hill Mathewson Lawrence (1910–1978) American botanist, author and professor of botany
- George Newbold Lawrence (1806–1895), American ornithologist
- George R. Lawrence (1868–1938), American photographer and aviation designer
- George P. Lawrence (1859–1917), U.S. Representative from Massachusetts, 1897–1913
- Sir George St Patrick Lawrence (1804–1884), English soldier, born in Ceylon
- George V. Lawrence (1818–1904), U.S. Representative from Pennsylvania

== See also ==
- George Lawrence Davis (1830–1894), missionary
- George Lawrence Price (1892–1918), the last soldier killed in WWI
- George Lawrence Mikan Jr. (1924–2005), American professional basketball player
