= Carey Gully =

- Town
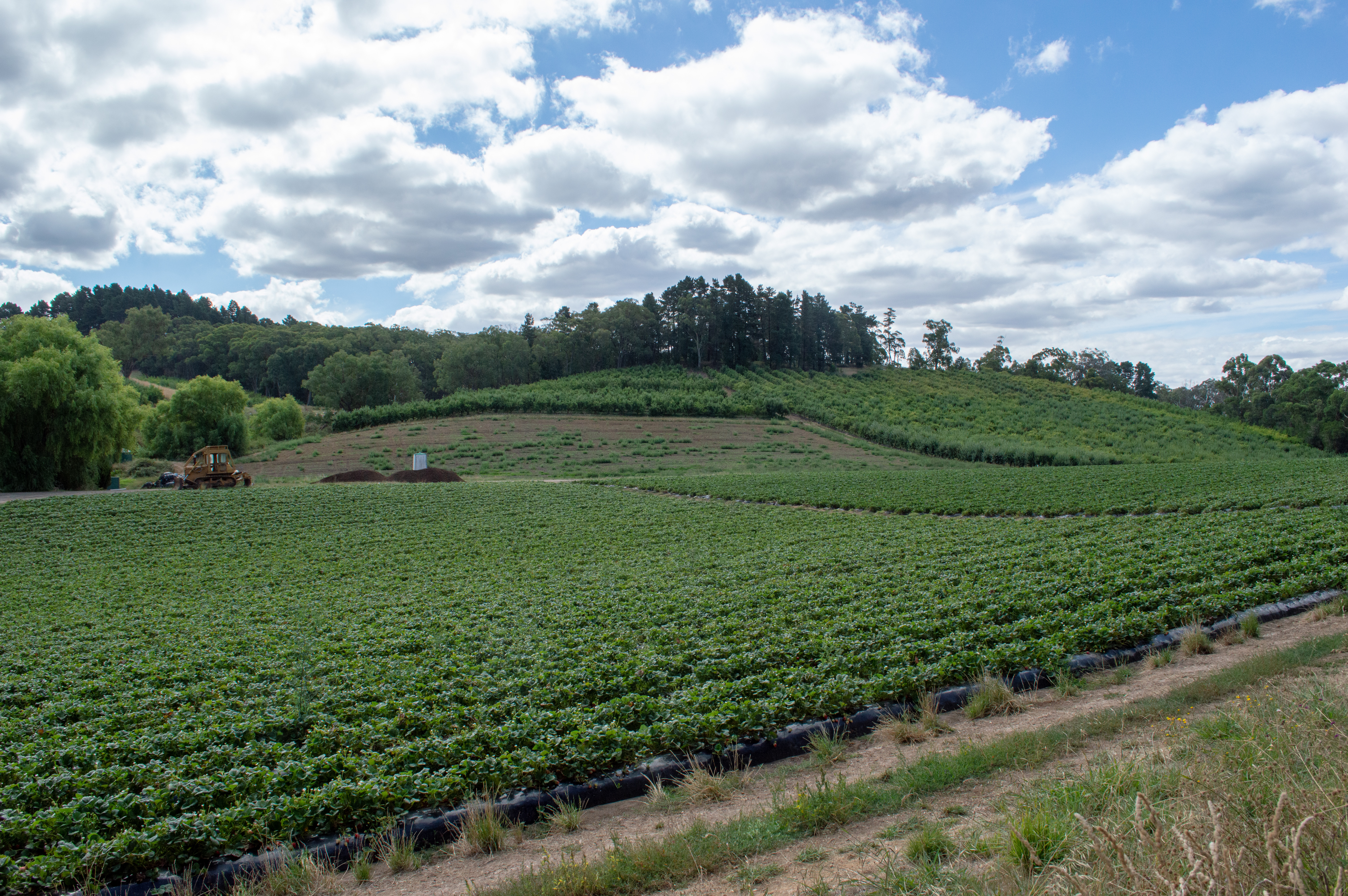
- Strawberry farm in Carey Gully

- Coordinates: 34°57′57″S 138°45′35″E
- Country: Australia
- State: South Australia
- Region: Adelaide Hills
- LGA: Adelaide Hills Council
- Location: 25.4 km (15.8 mi) E of Adelaide

Government
  - State electorate: Kavel
  - Federal division: Mayo

Population
  - Total: 428 (SAL 2021)
- Postcode: 5144
- County: Adelaide
Localities around Carey Gully
Uraidla	Basket Range; Forest Range	Balhannah
Uraidla; Piccadilly	Carey Gully	Balhannah
Piccadilly	Piccadilly; Mount George	Balhannah

Carey Gully is a small town in the Adelaide Hills region of South Australia.

The name of the town is taken from one of the early settlers of the area, Paddy Carey, and was originally called Carey's Gully, (This can be seen at the town's War Memorial on a wrought iron sign).

Whilst being named a "gully" the present township actually straddles part of the Mount Lofty Ranges, separating the valley townships of Uraidla to the west and Balhannah to the east. The older settlements in Carey Gully are located down smaller gullies where soil was suitable for agriculture.

Recent decades have seen the decline of the Carey Gully township, with the closure of the general store which also sold petrol. Still in operation are the Country Fire Service station, the Carey Gully Quarry and a small scale factory building on Deviation Road, housing a boatbuilding business and a traditional carpenter among others.

Greenhill Road is the main route through the town, upon which the hub of the township is located, but in the past much of the town's major establishments were located on adjacent Deviation Road. The road was an ideal location for the township in the past as it was situated on a largely dry, flat area (compared to the steep hills surrounding) and was also a main thoroughfare to the towns of Forest Range and Lenswood via Boundary Drive. Deviation Road once hosted a Football oval (Australian rules football) and tennis courts (now a strawberry field), and a general store which still stands to this day, but is currently a private residence.

The decline of the town has seen it become a much more quiet, idyllic location, attracting people from nearby Adelaide. The location of Carey Gully makes it cool in summer and provides brilliant views and cool, isolated valleys to those seeking a weekend getaway or quiet retirement.

Agriculture is the main industry with crops of strawberries, apples, cherries and wine grapes being grown. Along with this there are various hobby farms throughout the area running livestock such as goats, sheep, cattle, and deer.

Although much of the land is devoted to agriculture, as with many towns in the Adelaide Hills, Carey Gully has retained a large portion of its natural bushland which boasts many species of threatened and endangered flora and fauna, Wotton's Scrub and White's Scrub (part of the Kenneth Stirling Conservation Park) being excellent examples.

Carey Gully has been affected many times by bushfire, most notably the Ash Wednesday fires in 1983.

Public transport to Carey Gully is provided by the Adelaide Metro. Routes 821 & 822 provide a service to and from the City approximately every 2 hours, with route 822 also providing a link to nearby Stirling. More services to and from the city are provided at peak times.
