= Dai Davies =

Dai Davies may refer to:

- Dai Davies (sportsman) (1880–1944), rugby union, rugby league, and association footballer for Llanelli (RU), Wales (RL), Swinton, Wales (Soccer) and Bolton Wanderers
- Dai Davies (cricketer) (1896–1976), first-class cricketer for Glamorgan and Wales, and Test umpire
- Dai Davies (trade unionist) (1909–1998), Labour Party official and general secretary of the ISTC
- Dai Davies (rugby union, born 1925) (1925–2003), rugby union footballer of the 1940s and 1950s for British Lions, Wales, Penygraig, Somerset Police, British Police, Somerset, and Barbarian F.C.
- Dai Davies (rugby union, born 1897) (1897–1964), Welsh rugby union player
- Dai Davies (footballer, born 1948) (1948–2021), Everton F.C., Wrexham A.F.C. and Wales international goalkeeper
- Dai Davies (politician) (born 1959), independent MP for Blaenau Gwent, Wales 2006–2010
- Dai Davies (journalist) (1938–2008), English-born Welsh sports journalist
- Dai Davies (boxer) (born 1948), Welsh boxer
- Dai Davies, fictional minor character in the webcomic Scary Go Round

== See also ==
- David Davies (disambiguation)
