= Lenswood, South Australia =

Lenswood South Australia
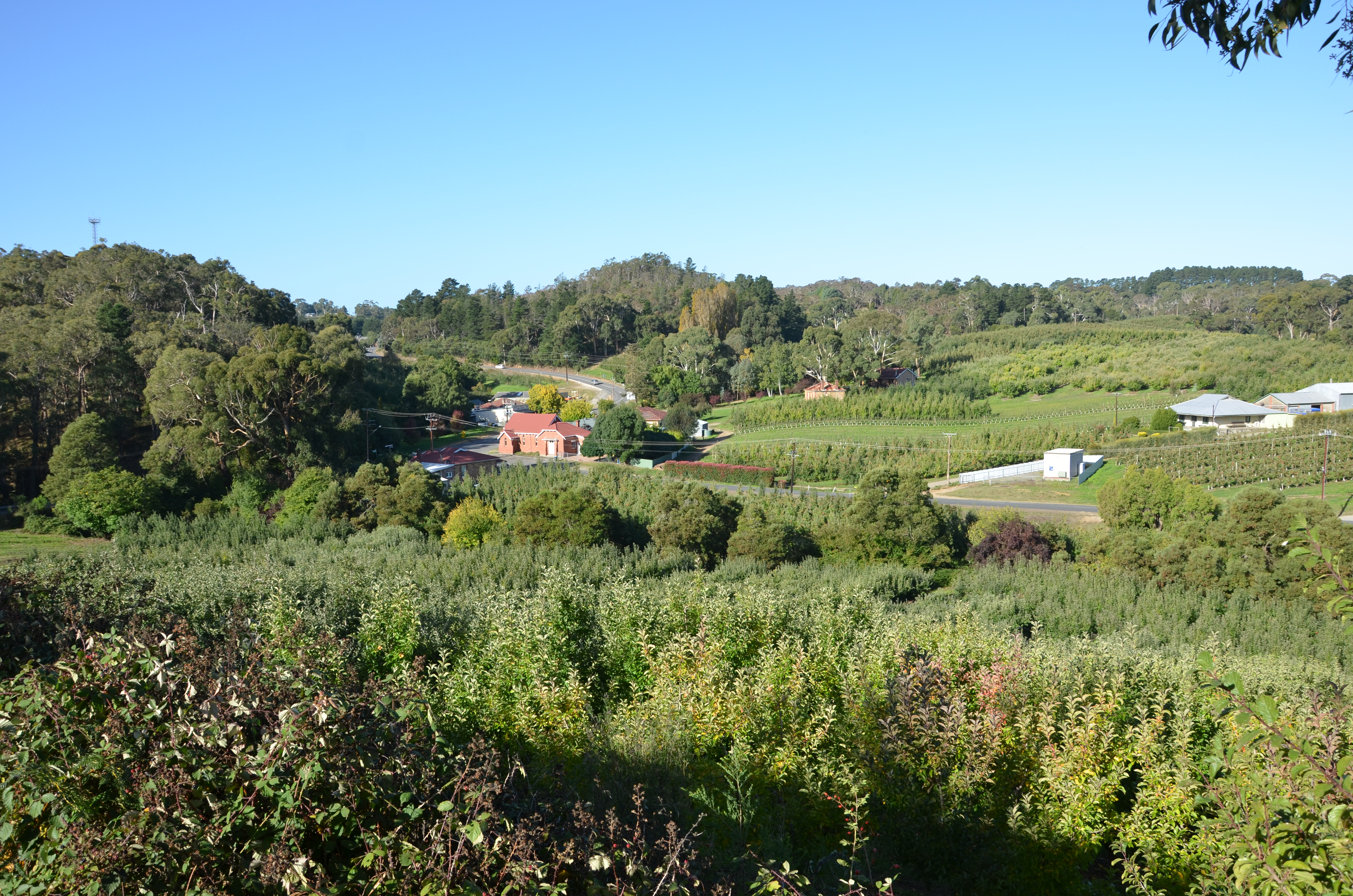
- Lenswood and surrounding orchards

- Coordinates: 34°55′11″S 138°49′52″E
- Population: 534 (SAL 2021)
- Established: 1917
- Postcode(s): 5240
- Elevation: 307 m (1,007 ft)
- Location: 29 km (18 mi) from Adelaide
- LGA(s): Adelaide Hills Council
- State electorate(s): Morialta
- Federal division(s): Mayo
Mean max temp	Mean min temp	Annual rainfall
18.4 °C; 65 °F	9.5 °C; 49 °F	1,013 mm 39.9 in
Localities around Lenswood:
Montacute, Cherryville	Cudlee Creek	Lobethal
Forest Range	Lenswood	Woodside
Carey Gully	Balhannah	Oakbank

Lenswood is a semi-rural village situated in the Adelaide Hills east of Adelaide, South Australia. The major industries are apples, pears, cherries and wine grapes.

== History ==
Lenswood is the youngest township in the Adelaide Hills. Prior to its establishment, it was part of Forest Range. In 1917, towards the end of the First World War, a new township was proclaimed between Forest Range and Lobethal. It was given the name Lenswood, after a recent battle near the town of Lens in northwestern France.

Originally, the main industry was cutting stringybark trees for timber. As these were cleared, the land was planted with orchards, which remains the major industry of the area to the present day. The district predominantly supplies apples, pears and cherries to local, interstate and overseas markets. More recently, several vineyards have been established.

Lenswood's central position in the Adelaide Hills orchard districts led to a large cold storage facility being built there in 1933. Called the Lenswood Coldstore Cooperative, the facility has storage for 400,000 bushels of fruit, processing mostly apples, pears and cherries.

== Geography ==
The township settlement is spread through a narrow river valley in one of the tributaries to the Onkaparinga River. Consequently, the town centre is far from centralised. Businesses including the cold store operations are to be found on the main roads and set back from the Adelaide – Lobethal Road. The narrow nature of the valleys have allowed an elongated and incomplete ribbon development along this main road.

The location has its own oval (Lenswood Memorial Park) on Swamp Road with another oval at the school and a Recreation Park on Lobethal Road. Lenswood relies on larger services being provided from other townships including Lobethal, Woodside, Balhannah and Summertown.

== Climate ==
Lenswood features a warm-summer Mediterranean climate (Köppen: Csb) with mild to warm, somewhat dry summers and chilly, very wet winters.

Climate data for Lenswood
Month	Jan	Feb	Mar	Apr	May	Jun	Jul	Aug	Sep	Oct	Nov	Dec	Year
Record high °C (°F)	41.3 (106.3)	39.6 (103.3)	39.3 (102.7)	33.9 (93.0)	30.5 (86.9)	20.6 (69.1)	22.2 (72.0)	23.9 (75.0)	29.9 (85.8)	33.9 (93.0)	38.4 (101.1)	37.7 (99.9)	41.3 (106.3)
Mean daily maximum °C (°F)	25.3 (77.5)	25.9 (78.6)	22.8 (73.0)	18.9 (66.0)	15.0 (59.0)	12.1 (53.8)	11.4 (52.5)	12.5 (54.5)	14.6 (58.3)	17.8 (64.0)	20.6 (69.1)	23.3 (73.9)	18.4 (65.1)
Mean daily minimum °C (°F)	12.9 (55.2)	13.5 (56.3)	12.3 (54.1)	10.6 (51.1)	8.6 (47.5)	6.7 (44.1)	6.1 (43.0)	6.3 (43.3)	7.1 (44.8)	8.5 (47.3)	10.0 (50.0)	11.6 (52.9)	9.5 (49.1)
Record low °C (°F)	4.2 (39.6)	5.8 (42.4)	4.4 (39.9)	2.3 (36.1)	1.5 (34.7)	−0.5 (31.1)	−1.8 (28.8)	0.6 (33.1)	−0.1 (31.8)	0.7 (33.3)	2.4 (36.3)	5.1 (41.2)	−1.8 (28.8)
Average precipitation mm (inches)	32.4 (1.28)	28.5 (1.12)	38.2 (1.50)	69.4 (2.73)	111.9 (4.41)	139.1 (5.48)	159.4 (6.28)	144.5 (5.69)	112.3 (4.42)	76.3 (3.00)	47.4 (1.87)	43.3 (1.70)	998.2 (39.30)
Average precipitation days (≥ 1.0 mm)	3.8	3.0	4.6	7.2	10.5	12.1	13.2	13.8	10.9	8.4	5.8	5.3	98.6
Source: Lenswood (1967–present)

== Facilities ==
Lenswood is home to several facilities. These include:

- The Lenswood Primary School
- The Lenswood Uniting Church
- The Lenswood Church of Christ
- The Lenswood General Store & Post Office
- Lenswood/Forest Range CFS
- Lenswood Ranges Cricket Club
- HILLS ARCHERS (target archery Club)

== See also ==
- Adelaide Hills Council
