= James Turnbull Thomson =

Australian publican (1810–c.1876)

James Turnbull Thomson (1810 – c. 20 August 1876) was a publican and brewer, recognised as the founder of Balhannah, South Australia.

== History ==
Thomson was a son of Rev. James Thomson, pastor of Steeple Church, Dundee, and his wife Hannah Thomson, née Turnbull.

He emigrated to South Australia aboard Georgiana, arriving in Adelaide in August 1839. Before leaving Scotland he purchased Section 4208 in the Mount Barker region. Another reference has him purchasing the land from Hampden Dutton after arriving in the colony.

In 1840 Thomson was involved with Robert Cock and J. L. Crabb in a venture to sell lots of land in Balhannah, which Thomson named for his mother (and also his sister) Hannah, the prefix Bal being a Gaelic word meaning "place" or "town", as in Balnagowan and Balmoral. He built the Balhannah Inn, which he let to one S. Bartlett who left shortly after. A year later he reopened the Inn, with himself as publican, followed by James Anderson. In 1855 Thomson's application for a licence was refused, while Edward Morris's application for the Golden Cross Hotel (now the Balhannah Hotel) was granted, sparking a feud which culminated in Thomson's serving time in jail for slander.

He brewed his first beer at Balhannah in August 1843 with the assistance of W. Milne and W. Johnston, one of the brothers who later founded the Oakbank Brewery. In June 1844 he was obliged to mortgage his property and in 1855 had a second attempt at beer brewing.

He was several times in financial difficulties, on one occasion helped out by his father, who purchased his property, then mortgaged it to pay a debt to Alexander Cock.

His body was found in marsh land near the North Arm Road, Dry Creek. He never married and appeared to have no relations in South Australia, though one John Thomson (1794–1869), later of "Lilybank", Mount Pleasant, and family are known to have stayed in the Balhannah region during their first years in the colony.
