= Kenneth Stirling =

Kenneth George Stirling (8 December 1935 – 8 November 1973) was a South Australian ecologist and philanthropist.

== History ==
Stirling was born in Adelaide, the elder son of George Leonard Stirling, né Strassburg, (December 1895 – 28 November 1973) and his wife Flora Elizabeth Joy Stirling, née Russell, (1908– ) who married in 1934.

He was educated at Quorn Primary School and Scotch College, Adelaide, followed by night studies at the University of Adelaide while employed in an accountant's office, and qualified B.Ec. in 1960. He found employment with Broken Hill Associated Smelters at Port Pirie in 1960 and later with Samin Limited, who had considerable holdings in nickel miner Poseidon NL, subject of furious speculation, which made his holdings in Samin quite valuable, and he was able to sell part of his holding at a substantial profit.

He made large donations to the Libraries Board of South Australia to aid in its archiving work, University Radio 5UV, the Australian Conservation Foundation and other public research, conservation and education bodies.

Samin was taken over by Poseidon in 1971 and Stirling resigned in 1972; he died of heart failure the following year.

== Family ==
Stirling married Bronte Stokes-Gooden ( – ) on 28 April 1962. They had a son and a daughter.

== Recognition ==
The Kenneth Stirling Conservation Park, purchased by the South Australian Government in 1990, was named for him in respect to being "a major donor to the preservation of native vegetation in South Australia."
