= John Lloyd (vicar of Cilcain) =

John Lloyd (1754 – 1807?) was a Welsh clergyman and academic.

== Life ==
Lloyd, born to a family from Llanstephan, Carmarthenshire, was educated at Jesus College, Oxford. He matriculated in 1758, and obtained a Bachelor of Arts degree in 1762, and Bachelor of Divinity degree in 1772. E. G. Hardy, in his history of the college (1899) records a "John Lloyd, Carm." as being a Fellow of the college between 1765 and 1773, thought to correspond to this John Lloyd. Lloyd would also appear to have become a corresponding member of the Honourable Society of Cymmrodorion in 1762. In 1773, he became vicar of Holywell, in Flintshire, North Wales, becoming vicar of Cilcain in 1782. His date of death is uncertain, but no successor was appointed before 1807.
