= Levi Gibbon =

Levi Gibbon (c. 1807 – 1 August 1870; "Lefi Gibbwn" in Welsh) was a Welsh balladeer. Born in Llanboidy, Carmarthenshire, in approximately 1807, he was a well known fiddler and writer and performer of ballads, in South, mid and West Wales.

He was married to Anne and they had five children - John, Benjamin, Esther, Mary and Anne.

Levi died on 1 August 1870 and is buried at Cwmfelin Mynach in the Ramoth Baptist graveyard. On the death certificate the cause of death is given as "Consumption".

Levi is one of the foci of a PhD that was submitted to University of Wales Lampeter in the 1990s. It can be viewed at the Library and also requested for Inter-Library Loan. The details are: Parry-Jones, Lilian: Astudiaeth o Faledi Levi Gibbon, Thomas Harris a Stephen Jones, yn ogystal â Rhai Baledi Eraill o’r Un Cylch, Traethawd PhD Prifysgol Cymru (Llanbedr Pont Steffan), 1992.

See also Parry-Jones, Lilian: ‘Baledi Levi Gibbon, Thomas Harris, Stephen Jones, ac Eraill’, Llên Cymru, 19 (1996), tt.85-129.
