= Piccadilly, South Australia =

Coordinates: 34°59′S 138°44′E

Piccadilly South Australia
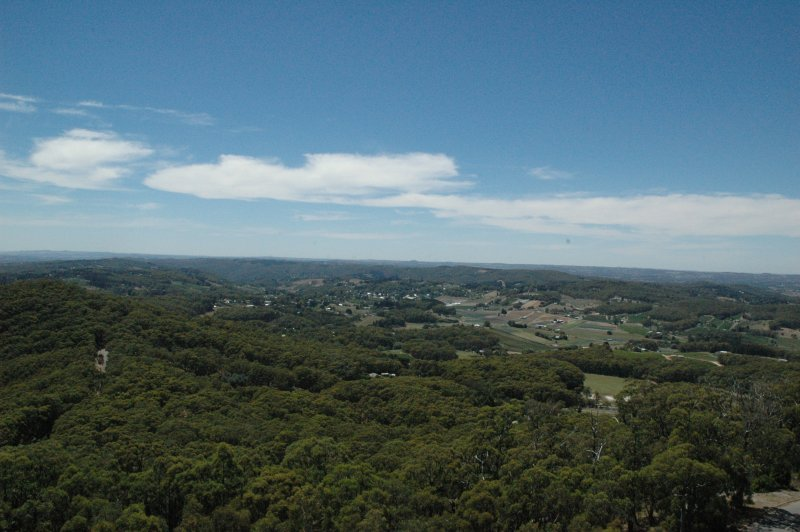
- Piccadilly from Mount Lofty
- Population: 405 (SAL 2021)
- Postcode(s): 5151
- LGA(s): Adelaide Hills Council
- State electorate(s): Kavel
- Federal division(s): Mayo
Localities around Piccadilly:
Greenhill	Summertown	Uraidla
Mount Osmond	Piccadilly	Carey Gully
Mount Osmond	Crafers	Mount George

Piccadilly is a small town in the Adelaide Hills of South Australia, Australia. As of 2021, Piccadilly has a population of around 405.

The Piccadilly Valley was for many decades a market gardening center which produced food for the Adelaide and overseas market. A large part of the valley is now used for growing premium 'cool climate' grape varieties.

Piccadilly is home to the Woodhouse Scout Centre, which in addition to scout jamborees hosts school camps and various outdoor activities.

== Transport ==
Piccadilly is serviced by two routes, 822 and 866. Route 822 goes to the City via Carey Gully, and route 866 goes to Crafers at which point it connects to a bus to the City via the South Eastern Freeway.

== See also ==
- Piccadilly Valley wine sub-region
