= Dave Davis (musician) =

Jazz trombonist

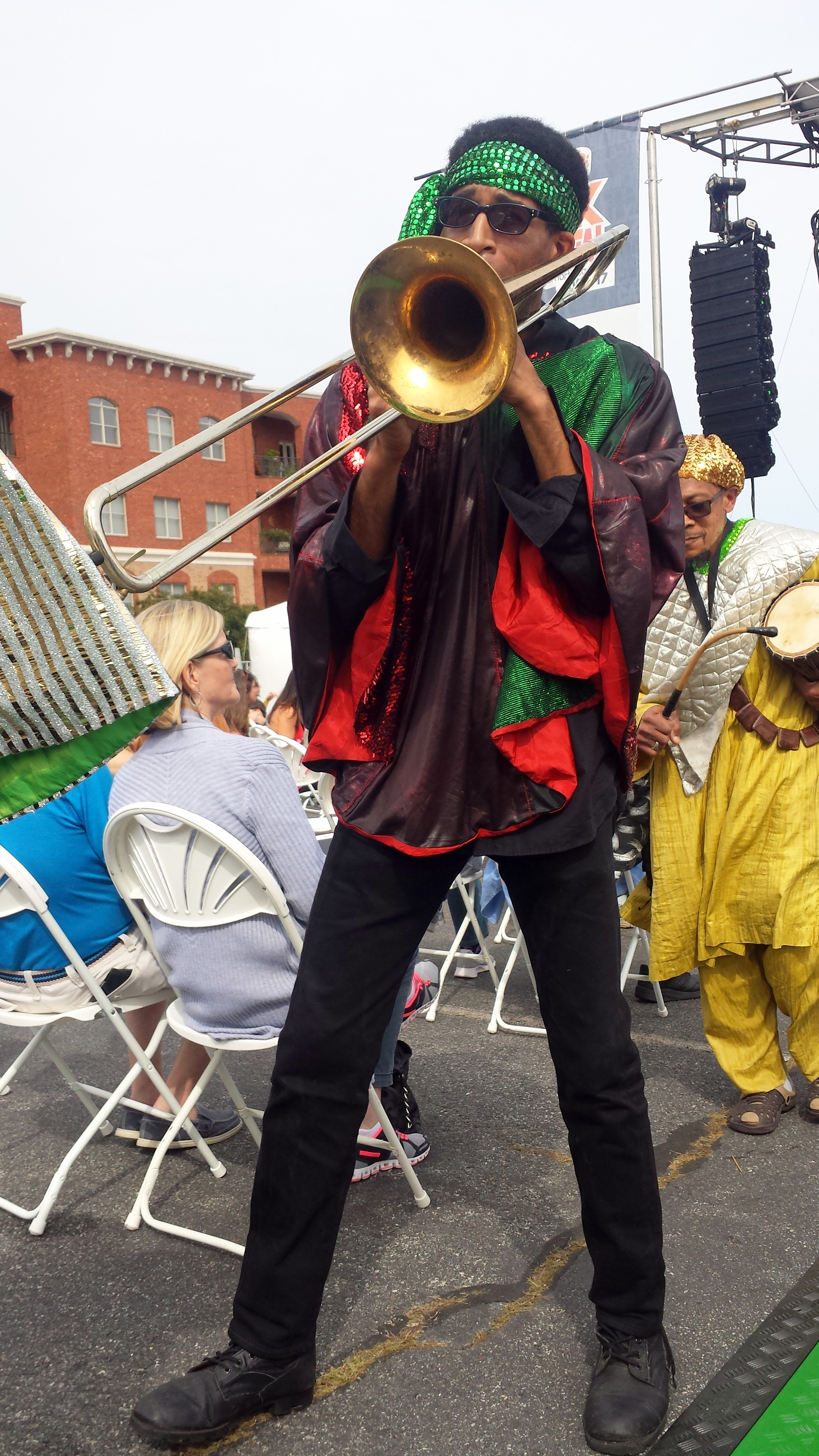
- Davis in 2017
- Occupation: musician
- Known for: Sun Ra Arkestra

Dave Davis is a jazz musician known for playing trombone with the Sun Ra Arkestra since 1997. He is one of the younger members of the band and has been called the "party-starting trombonist," with his Twitter account offering a new look into the workings of this longtime jazz band.

Davis became acquainted with the local jazz scene while playing with the Frank Jackson Orchestra which was also where he met Tyrone Hill who played with Sun Ra. Davis took lessons with Hill for several years before starting to play with the Arkestra. He started with the Arkestra as second trombonist, frequently improvising with Hill, the lead trombonist. When Hill died in 2007, Davis took over as lead trombone player.

== Personal life ==
Davis was born in Kansas City, Missouri. He was in the Marines from Marines from 1987 to 1991, and moved to Philadelphia in 1991 to attend Temple University.
