= David Davies (harpist) =

Welsh harpist (1817–1855)

David Davies (1817–1855) was a Welsh harpist. His father was David Davies of Gelligaer, Glamorganshire. He learnt the harp from a young age, and to complete his education studied in France for three years, becoming a skilled performer on the triple harp . He competed at Eisteddfod, and won a number of prizes.

He died in 1855 and is buried in Gelligaer churchyard.
