= David Joshua Davies =

Welsh dramatist (1877-1945)

David Joshua Davies (1877–1945) was a Welsh dramatist. His parents were John and Mary (née Evans) Davies. He began his career as an apprentice in an ironmonger's store in Swansea, but went on to earn his living as a shopkeeper, managing the Co-operative store in Llanarth for a while, and later a shop and the post office in Pont-rhyd-y-groes.

His writings include the play 'Maes y Meillion' (which won a prize at the National Eisteddfod in Neath in 1918), and the play 'Owen Glyndŵr'.

He died in 1945, and is buried in New Quay.
