= Mount George (Antarctica) =

Mountain in Enderby Land, Antarctica

Mount George (67°43′S 50°0′E) is a mountain, 1,555 m, close west of Simpson Peak in the Scott Mountains. Plotted from air photos taken by ANARE (Australian National Antarctic Research Expeditions) in 1956 and 1957. The name was first applied by John Biscoe (1830-31), probably after one of the Enderby Brothers, the owners of his vessel. As Biscoe's feature could not be identified among the many peaks in the area, the name was applied to this feature by Antarctic Names Committee of Australia (ANCA) in 1962.
