= David John Davies =

Welsh artist (born 1870)

David John Davies was a 19th-century Welsh artist. He was born in 1870 in Llandeilo, Carmarthenshire. For a period he studied at Kidderminster Art School, before obtaining two years of public subscription funding to study art in Antwerp. Returning to Wales he opened a studio in Llanelli, where he was assisted by funding from a number of patrons: Mrs Gwynne Hughes (Tregŷb), Lord Dynevor, Lord Emlyn, D. Pugh MP, and Mansel Lewis. The works he produced include painted landscapes and portraits, illustrations, and caricatures.

After four years in Llanelli he moved to London, where for a time he worked for The Graphic, before returning again to Wales, to open a new studio in Llandeilo.

During the Second Boer War (1899) he was posted to the Lord Roberts Horse Brigade and worked as a freelance artist and journalist. He is thought to have remained in South Africa until his death (the date of which is unknown) and to have continued painting, producing late works such as African Sunset, displayed at the 1924 British Empire Exhibition.
