= David Davies (musician) =

British flautist, conductor and composer (born 1954)

- Born: 1954 (age 71–72); Dunfermline, Scotland
- Genres: Contemporary classical
- Occupations: Composer, conductor
- Instruments: Flute

David Davies (born 1954) is a British flautist, conductor and composer.

Davies has held principal positions in the Royal Scottish National Orchestra and the Scottish Opera Orchestra, performed in the UK and internationally, and taught at the Royal Scottish Academy of Music and Drama.

He founded the Paragon Ensemble Scotland in 1980, and served as the company's artistic director for twenty years.
