= David Davies (public health official) =

British health official (1822–1894)

David Davies (1822–1894) was a surgeon and the first Medical Officer of Health in Bristol from 1865 to 1886. By embracing then controversial and emerging scientific thinking on germ theory, Davies is known for his role in transforming public health in Victorian Bristol from being the one of the three deadliest cities in England, to being described by The Times as "nearly the most healthy town in Great Britain". Conversely, he attracted considerable criticism, during his lifetime and by twenty-first century analysts, for his refusal to use his statutory powers to tackle some of the worst slum housing in Victorian England.

In 1965 the city celebrated the first centenary of Davies' appointment by publishing a history in brochure form.

Davies’ biography Public health in Victorian Bristol: the work of David Davies, Medical Officer of Health was published in 2015, written by Peter Malpass and Michael Whitfield. Malpass also delivered a University of the West of England public seminar criticising Davies' inaction on slum housing subtitled How the City Preserved its Slums.

== Life and career ==
Son of Samuel Davies, a farmer, David Davies was born and died in Brongwyn, Cardigan, Wales. He had two children Sarah and David Samuel Davies, the latter who succeeded him as Medical Officer of Health in Bristol. In 1910 his widow Harriet Davies (née Eddowes, of Loughborough) was noted as the principal landowner in the parish of Brongwyn.

Davies was considered an outsider both in the medical profession and his adopted home of Bristol, beginning his medical career as an apprentice rather than as a medical student. He went on to train at St Thomas Hospital and won the Cheselden Medal in clinical surgery, qualifying in 1845 as a member of the Royal College of Surgeons. For three years Davies worked as house surgeon at the Loughborough Infirmary before moving to Bristol and establishing a private practice in post-riot Queen's Square. He was also consulting surgeon to the Bristol Dispensary and honorary surgeon to the Bristol Corporation of the Poor before being elected as Bristol's first Medical Inspector of Health then Medical Officer of Health, initially for 6 months.

Davies was ambitious and made his mark in medicine, writing for the Lancet and British Medical Journal and serving as president of the public medicine section of the British Medical Association. Davies retired in 1884 to his birthplace in Cardigan where he served as a magistrate and died in 1894.

== Impact on public health ==
When Davies started as Medical Inspector of Health in Bristol the prevailing medical orthodox wisdom was miasma theory, that diseases like typhoid and cholera were caused by breathing bad air or foul odours. Bristol's William Budd demonstrated these were in fact waterborne diseases. Davies was convinced by the scientific evidence, rejected mainstream approaches and organised Bristol's public health along the lines of the emerging scientific evidence. He set about implementing a citywide disinfection programme. Davies reported that diseases were carried through infected milk and directed scant investigation resources in this direction, where mainstream proponents of miasma theory would investigate dung heaps and rubbish piles.

Prior to Davies’ appointment Bristol's 1849 cholera outbreak claimed round 2,000 lives. The 1866 outbreak took only 29 lives as Davies isolated patient zero and instituted rigorous disinfection protocols. In his write-up of the incident in the British Medical Journal, William Budd concluded that "Bristol has been singularly fortunate [in appointing him] … Mr Davies was exactly the man for the work … he rightly judged that every hour was of importance to success."

In the 1840s some commentators ranked Bristol as the third least healthy city in England, ranked behind only Liverpool and Manchester in mortality rates. During Davies tenure in charge of public health in Bristol the number of deaths per year consistently fell by a quarter, which compared favourably with Manchester and Liverpool. By the end of Davies’ career Bristol was described as one of the country's healthiest cities. This was only in part due to the primary role of Davies and public health was in prevention and isolation of infectious diseases and not in the treatment of the sick, prevention of nuisances or the concurrent improvements to city sanitation and water supply. Davies’ friend William Budd was also credited with saving Bristol from cholera.

Davies’ obituary in the British Medical Journal said of the fall in Bristol's mortality that:

"This remarkable improvement was due in great part to his organising faculty … The whole sanitary organisation of the city and port had to be created by him … Typhus was extinguished. Asiatic cholera diminished … Enteric fever, diarrhoea, smallpox and scarlet fever showed a gradual decline and diphtheria never gained a hold in the city."

The role of Medical Officer of Health at this time did not lead a well-resourced health department; Davies was more a self-employed consultant with access to a handful of workers. Davies’ relied at times on volunteer efforts and charitable fundraising. Notably a group of 28 women recruited by Edith Grace Norris (née Lushington), paid for by a local subscription, were each given a district to go door to door to visit at-risk houses to ensure Davies’ instructions of daily disinfection of toilets was adhered to.

=== Redland typhoid outbreak ===
One investigation detailed by Malpass and Whitfield concerned a typhoid outbreak in Napier Road in Redland in July 1878. Davies investigated initially 20 cases in the street, establishing any commonalities between households with cases and other houses in the street with no infection present. Davies found that there was no defining contact between the households and that sewers and drains were in good condition. The commonality identified was that the 20 houses with cases were supplied milk by one milk dealer, whereas the houses without cases were supplied by different dealers. The milk dealer himself was in good health with clean premises.

Davies traced the infection to a woman who had some time previously been sent to a dairy farm in Henleaze to recover from typhoid. The outside toilet at the farm was five yards from the water pump. Davies’ tests of the water found it infected an on threat of prosecution the farmer re-sited the water pump and toilet to prevent future contamination.

The outbreak spread further than was necessary as a different milk dealer continued to supply their stock of infected milk. The dealer doggedly refused to believe Davies that the milk could be infected, even continuing to drink it himself, and died of typhoid soon afterwards.

=== Slum housing criticism ===
In 1865, the same year Davies was first elected medical inspector of health in Bristol, the UK government's Chief Medical Officer Sir John Simon placed Bristol second in a list overcrowded and unfit housing. Successive acts of Parliament during Davies’ tenure gave Medical Officers of Health the statutory powers to clear slum housing.

In 1871 Davies persuaded the Health Board to adopt regulations that set a minimum space standard in housing, based on a figure proposed by Sir John Simon.

In 1875 Davies was clearly moved by the plight of people displaced by flooding around Baptist Mills and Mina Road. The Cross Act of 1875 gave local authorities the power to clear areas of unfit and unhealthy housing. Within months of the act's Royal Assent Davies used the new law to declare part of the flooded area uninhabitable, a move described as novel and imaginative in the Lancet. Magistrates overturned Davies’ decision following a challenge by property owners concerned about not receiving rent money.

Later Davies told the Royal Commission on housing that he has tried to implement the Cross Act “and failed”. Following this 1875 setback he was “careful to do as little as possible” on housing, according to Malpass and Whitfield, being “resourceful in finding reasons not to take action on unfit or overcrowded houses. His strategy of non-intervention was based on a number of tactical ploys, the most prominent of which was denial.” Given his statutory position of influence Davies refusal to act held back others. In 1877 the Bristol Guardians complained about the notorious slums off Redcross Street and around Lewin's Mead but Davies shut down the argument claiming it did not meet the terms of the Cross Act.

When interviewed by the Royal Commissioners on Housing they were "exasperated" by Davies’ complete denial of any overcrowded housing in Bristol and questioned the accuracy of his testimony.

The British Medical Journal were critical about lack of action on housing in Bristol and concluded Davies’ assertion that there were no areas of Bristol where housing could be improved under the Cross Act was “hard to believe.”

Local newspaper the Bristol Mercury went on the offensive about the “official disinclination” to improve Bristol's housing.

In 1884 radical investigative journalism produced a report into The homes of the Bristol Poor, which outraged the public. The following year the Royal Commission on Housing reported, citing evidence from Bristol, and led to the Housing of the Working Classes Act of 1885.

Davies retired in 1886 and moved back to his birthplace in Cardigan.

== Character and views ==
In his obituary in the British Medical Journal described the improvement in Bristol's mortality rates and ascribed it to Davies "organising faculty, his untiring watchfulness, sound judgement, knowledge of mankind, and physical and moral courage."

William Budd described Davies as "vigilant, earnest, energetic, faithful, in the highest sense of the word, not afraid to exceed his powers when to stay within them might gave an opportunity to the foe – the pestilence itself."

After the 1869 cholera outbreak The Times also reported, "Mr Davies has triumphed over nearly every obstacle and has earned nearly every point. He has hunted down disease with the keenness and perseverance of a bloodhound and with the ardour and sagacity of a blood sportsman, convincing where he could not compel, persuading where he could not convince."

Malpass and Whitfield summed up that Davies could be "both churlish (as in his response to a request to help a sick man in Queen’s Square) and empathetic." Describing him as a shrewd operator that "craved fixed rules and procedures"; was self-effacing when praised about Bristol's improved mortality rate, "but when faced with challenges to his professional judgment he could be haughty, obtuse and sarcastic."

Davies views on housing problems and solutions were controversial. In 1877 he said of infant mortality that housing played a small part, but that bad parenting was the greater part. In 1884 he blamed the increased deaths in infants on more factories employing women. Davies disapproved where slums were cleared to make way for new tenements, he described these as the plague pits of the future. He was part of a Victorian individualist tradition, placing emphasis on health education and personal responsibility, but roundly rejecting the clear systemic and structural inequalities at play.

Davies was praised by some and condemned by others. Malpass and Whitfield concluded this was because he “stood at the centre of a battle between progressive and reactionary forces”.

Malpass and Whitfield suggest that the political composition of the council Bristol meant Davies could not rely on their backing for any radical action, that he was attempting to achieve what was possible in practice. Davies’ post was subject to annual election by councillors. Davies was often unhappy with his experience of being an elected official and spoke out in favour of Medical Officers of Health being appointed positions rather than elected.
