= David Christopher Davies =

English geologist and mining engineer

David Christopher Davies (1827 – 19 September 1885) was a Welsh geologist and mining engineer.

== Life and career ==
He was born and grew up in the Oswestry area, and began his career as the apprentice of a local ironmonger, John Minshall. As a member of the Oswestry Naturalists' Field Club he developed an interest in the geology of the area, and the age of 30 set himself up as a mining engineer, working mainly in north Wales, but also in France and Germany.

His geological writings include his "Guide to Llangollen" (which had reached its 3rd edition by 1864), "A Treatise on Slate and Slate Quarrying in North Wales" (1878 and 1880), "A Treatise on Metalliferous Minerals and Mining" (1880), "A Treatise on Earth Minerals and Mining" (1884), and a number of papers published in the Geological Magazine, the Proceedings of the Geologists' Association, and the Quarterly Journal of the Geological Society.

Davies was a Fellow of the Geological Society.

Following the example of John Minshall who had supervised his apprenticeship, Davies was active in the local Congregational Church. A lay preacher, he published a volume of his sermons, The Christ for all the Ages.

His son, George Christopher Davies (1849 – 1922), was credited as being "The Man who Found the Broads".

== Death ==
He died on his way home from Norway in 1885.

== Legacy ==
After his death, his daughter Mary Broughall (1855-1932) – known in the family as Polly – published with her brother George an account of their life in Aveyron, Our Life in Aveyron, where they had lived while David was working at a local silver-lead mine.
