= Mount Emerson (California) =

Mountain in California, United States

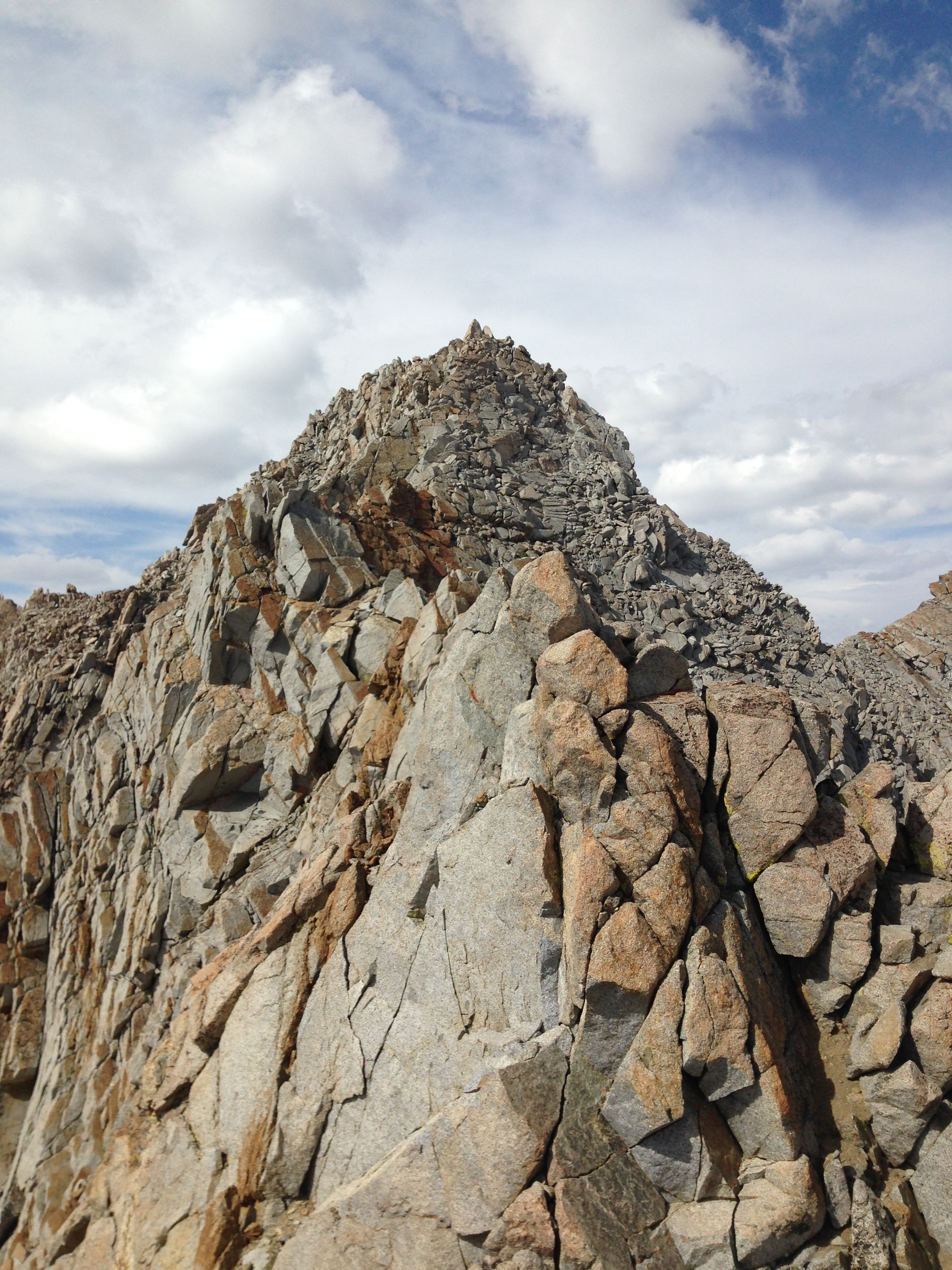
- Mount Emerson Summit Ridge

Highest point
- Elevation: 13,210 ft (4,026 m)
- Prominence: 724 ft (221 m)
- Listing: Sierra Club Sierra Peaks Section; Western States Climbers peak
- Coordinates: 37°14′41″N 118°39′35″W

Geography
- Location within California Location within the United States
- Location: John Muir Wilderness Area; Inyo County, California, U.S.
- Parent range: Sierra Nevada
- Topo map: USGS Mount Darwin

Climbing
- First ascent: July 1, 1926 by Norman Clyde
- Easiest route: Exposed scramble (class 3)

Mount Emerson is located in the Sierra Nevada in Inyo County in eastern California, United States. Mount Emerson is the 116th highest mountain in California and the 671st highest mountain in the United States.

== History ==
Mount Emerson is named in honor of the essayist, poet and philosopher Ralph Waldo Emerson. John Muir wrote in a letter to Mrs. Ezra S. Carr that "I have named a grand wide-winged mountain on the head of the Joaquin Mount Emerson. Its head is high above its fellows and wings are white with ice and snow." It has been suggested that Muir might have intended to confer the poet's name on Mount Humphreys which had already been named by the Whitney Survey.

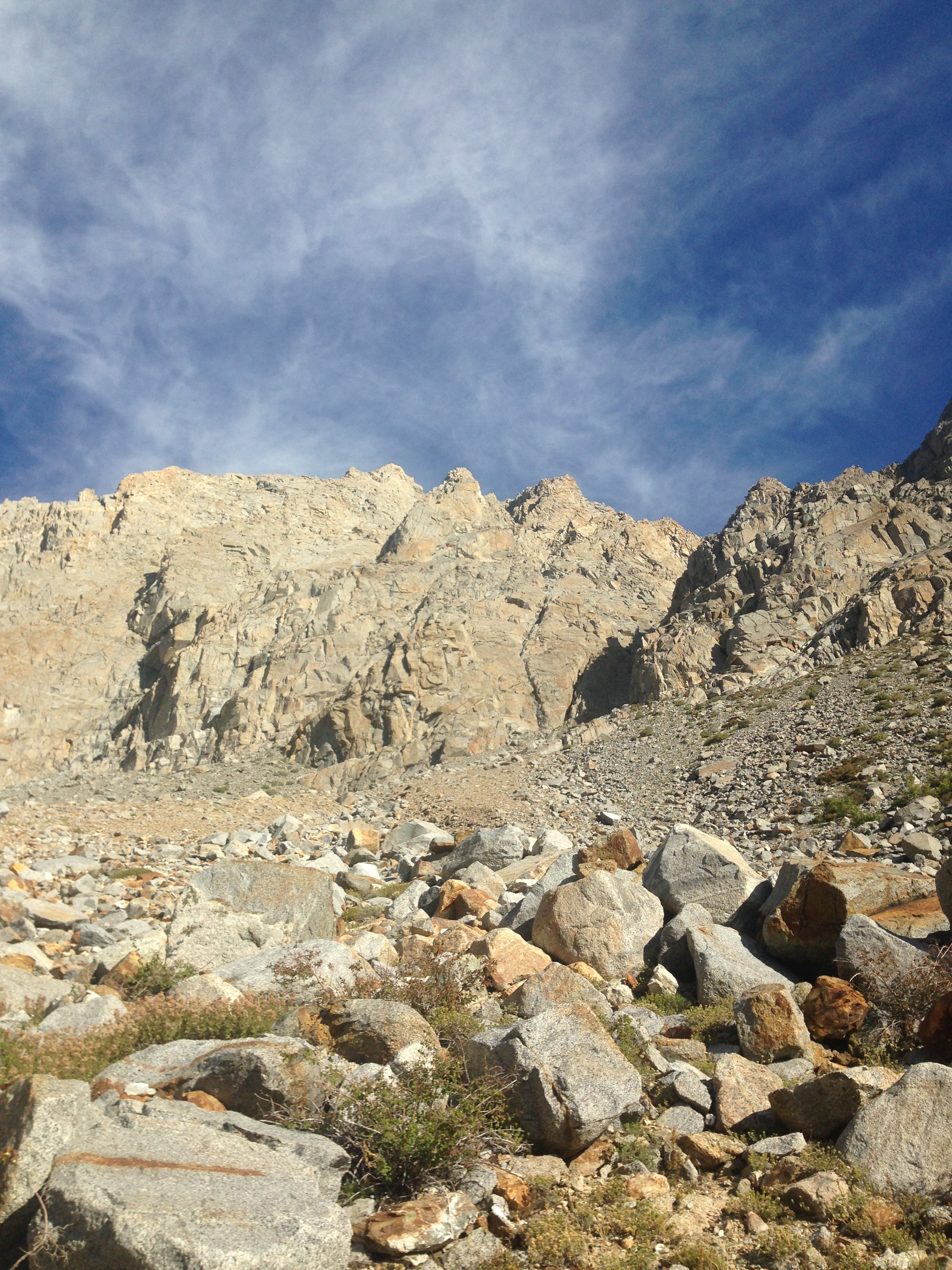
Mount Emerson viewed from the east

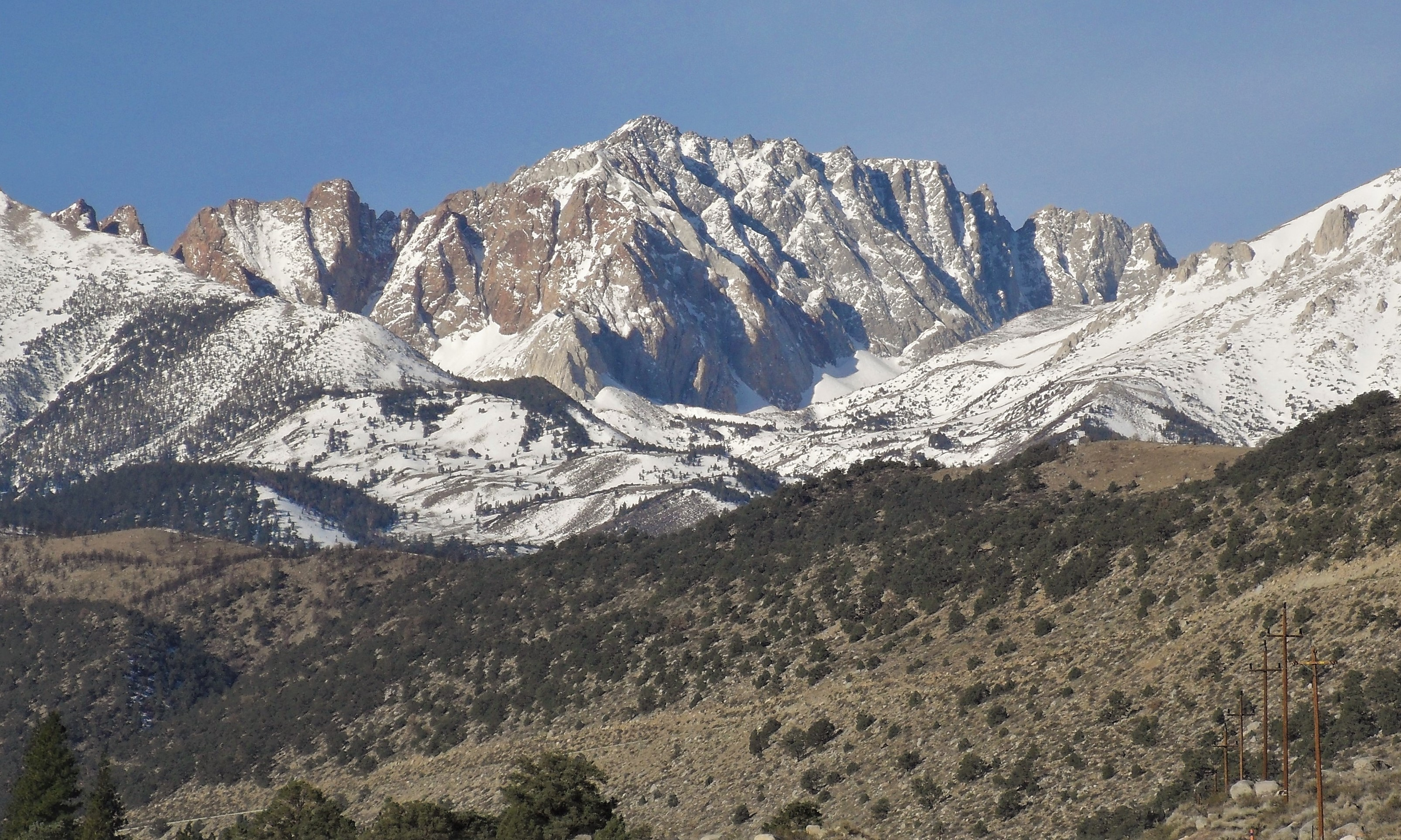
Mt. Emerson from northeast
