= George Christopher Davies =

George Christopher Davies (11 October 1849, Oswestry – 29 November, 1922, Norwich) was a prolific photographer and writer who played an important role in encouraging popular awareness of the Norfolk Broads.

George was the eldest child of the geologist, David Christopher Davies. In 1871 after having recently qualified as a lawyer he read an account of the Norfolk Broads and decided to apply to join the legal practice of Abel Tillett in Norwich.

== Books ==
- (1875) The Golden Shaft (1875) London: Bentley

- Volume 1
- Volume 2
- Volume 3

- (1875) Rambles and Adventures of Our School Field-Club, London: Henry S. King,
- (1876) The Swan and Her Crew: or, The Adventures of Three Young Naturalists and Sportsmen on the Broads and Rivers of Norfolk
- (1891) Our Home in Averyon: with studies of peasant life and customs in Aveyron and the Lot London: W. Blackwood
