= David Davis (cricketer) =

Personal information
- Full name: David Grant Davis
- Born: 12 January 1902; Wanstead, Hawke's Bay, New Zealand
- Died: 2 March 1995 (aged 93); Auckland, New Zealand
- Batting: Right-handed
- Bowling: Right-arm medium

Domestic team information
- Years: Team
- 1920-21: Hawke's Bay

Career statistics
Competition	First-class
Matches	3
Runs scored	88
Batting average	17.60
100s/50s	0/1
Top score	61
Catches/stumpings	0/0
- Source: Cricinfo, 30 October 2017

David Grant Davis (12 January 1902 – 2 March 1995) was a New Zealand cricketer and judge.

== Cricket career ==
Davis played three matches of first-class cricket for Hawke's Bay in 1920–21. They were Hawke's Bay's last three matches as a first-class team. In the second match, against Wellington, a few days before Davis's 19th birthday, Hawke's Bay followed on 286 runs in arrears and were 167 for 7 in their second innings when Davis went to the wicket. He hit 61 in half an hour, at one point hitting nine boundaries in a little over ten minutes. Nevertheless, Hawke's Bay lost by an innings and 17 runs.

He continued to play for Hawke's Bay and was also secretary of the Hawke's Bay Cricket Association until he moved to Gisborne in 1927.

== Legal career ==
Davis was educated at Wanganui Collegiate School before becoming a law clerk in 1920. He worked for the Public Trust office in Napier before being transferred to Gisborne in 1927. He qualified as a solicitor and practised in Waitara and Wanganui, where he was appointed district solicitor in 1939. He was appointed as a judge of the Māori Land Court in 1961.

== Personal life ==
Davis and his wife Kathleen married in 1927 and had one daughter. He was the last surviving Hawke's Bay first-class cricketer.
