= David Davies (Welsh priest) =

Welsh clergyman and author

David Davies (1742–1819) was a Welsh clergyman in the Church of England and author. He was born on 9 February 1742 of Welsh parentage at Machynlleth and educated at Codrington College, Barbados and Jesus College, Oxford. His father was Richard Davies.

He was Rector of Barkham in Berkshire, England, from 1781 until his death.

Davies studied the condition of the labouring poor, recorded statistics of their wages, cost of food, etc. in various districts of England and Scotland. A controversial rapid rise in Poor Law costs at the time (especially in rural parishes) instigated debates on the issue, and inspired Davies to compile statistics from which he produced data covering the income and expenditure of certain families in the country (including three in the parishes of Llandegla and Llanarmon (Denbighshire), and two in the parishes of Llanfor and Llanycil (Merioneth).

He published his findings in 1795 as a book called Cases of Labourers in Husbandry Stated and Considered in Three Parts, an important work in social history. Part 1, Section 2 contains what is considered the first usage of household surveys. Davies claims to have collected 2–3 surveys from every county in the kingdom with the help of his friends. From these surveys, poor households on average spent 75% of their income on food. Through this publication, Davies called for a marked improvement in the standard of living for agricultural labourers. He demonstrated that the 'Poor Rates' were used as a means to keep wages down. He presented calculations in Section 7, which show that the number of days an average laborer had to work to afford a quarter of wheat doubled between the 14th century and the 18th century. For policy recommendations, he advocated the principle of a minimum wage.

He died on 6 February 1819 at Barkham.
