= David G. Davies =

American biologist

David G. Davies is an American microbiologist whose research has significantly shaped modern understanding of bacterial biofilms, establishing biofilms as regulated, multicellular-like systems rather than passive surface accumulations.

He is a Professor in the Department of Biological Sciences at Binghamton University and Director of the Binghamton Biofilm Research Center. He has also served as Chair of the Institutional Biosafety Committee (2008-2025) and co‑founded Excelsior Biofilms LLC, reflecting his engagement in translational and applied biofilm research. He has a Ph.D. in Microbiology from Montana State University (1996). He has delivered numerous invited lectures at national and international conferences, including multiple ASM Biofilms meetings, Gordon Research Conferences, and industry‑focused symposia, underscoring his influence in both academic and applied microbiology. His career has focused on uncovering the molecular mechanisms that govern biofilm formation, community behavior, and regulated dispersal.

== Early Career and Foundational Work on Biofilm Development ==
Davies’ early research demonstrated that biofilms are not passive accumulations of cells but regulated, multicellular‑like systems. His graduate work showed that Pseudomonas aeruginosa activates alginate biosynthesis genes upon surface attachment, revealing that contact with a substratum triggers specific transcriptional programs rather than simple growth on a surface.

A major breakthrough came with his 1998 Science paper showing that quorum sensing (cell-to-cell communication) controls biofilm development, providing the first evidence that cell–cell communication coordinates biofilm architecture and persistence. In his study, he discovered that bacteria actually talk to each other using chemical signals, a process called quorum sensing, and that this communication controls how biofilms form and maintain their structure. His work was the first to prove that bacteria use these signals to build organized, layered communities, changing the way scientists understood how biofilms develop and persist.

Discovery of Biofilm Dispersion as a Regulated Developmental Stage

Davies is best known for pioneering the modern concept of biofilm dispersion. Dispersion is the regulated, active process by which mature biofilm bacteria disassemble their extracellular polymeric substance (EPS) matrix and transition from a sessile (attached) lifestyle back into a free-swimming, planktonic state. Before his work, the loss of biofilm biomass, often described as sloughing, erosion, or detachment, was viewed as a passive mechanical process. No evidence suggested that bacteria actively initiated their departure from a biofilm. Davies demonstrated that dispersion is instead a regulated, signal‑driven developmental transition. His research showed that bacteria can actively exit a biofilm. This observation let to the discovery of a signal produced by Pseudomonas aeruginosa, a fatty acid called cis‑2‑decenoic acid, which functions as a native dispersion autoinducer. His group demonstrated that cis‑DA is a cross‑species and cross-kingdom signal that triggers active dispersal, metabolic reprogramming, motility activation, and a marked increase in antimicrobial susceptibility. These findings established cis‑DA as a universal signal to induce dispersion from biofilms. His group furthermore demonstrated that exposure to this universal autoinducer initiates a coordinated physiological shift characterized by reduced c‑di‑GMP levels, activation of motility pathways, metabolic reprogramming, and a marked increase in antimicrobial susceptibility.

Building on this discovery, Davies’ team identified the first complete biosynthetic and sensory pathway for a native dispersion signal. They showed that the enzyme DspI, a putative enoyl‑CoA hydratase, is required for cis‑DA synthesis, defining the molecular origin of the signal. More recently, they identified DspS as the dedicated cis‑DA sensory protein, establishing how Pseudomonas aeruginosa detects the signal and transduces it into a dispersion response. Together, DspI and DspS form the first fully characterized pathway linking signal synthesis, signal detection, and execution of dispersion, providing a mechanistic framework for understanding and manipulating dispersion in both clinical and industrial contexts.

Broader Scientific Impact and Translational Contributions

Davies’ subsequent research mapped the regulatory events, proteomic shifts, and virulence transitions associated with biofilm formation and dispersal. His group showed that dispersed cells exhibit distinct pathogenic behaviors and that dispersion can be exploited to enhance antibiotic efficacy. These insights have driven translational advances in wound care, dental applications, industrial biofouling control, and medical device protection. His work also contributed to understanding biofilms in human disease, including studies showing that bacteria in atherosclerotic plaques form biofilms and undergo dispersion in response to host‑associated signals such as norepinephrine and iron.

Collectively, Davies’ contributions established the conceptual and mechanistic framework for understanding biofilm development, quorum‑sensing‑driven community behavior, and dispersion as a programmable, therapeutically actionable phase of the biofilm life cycle.
