= David E. Davis (ecologist) =

Ecologist and animal behaviorist

- Born: July 18, 1913; Chicago, Illinois, U.S.
- Died: October 31, 1994 (aged 81); Santa Barbara, California, U.S.

Academic background
- Education: Swarthmore College (BA); Harvard University (MS, PhD)

Academic work
- Discipline: Ecology · zoology
- Sub-discipline: Wildlife disease
- Institutions: Johns Hopkins University; Pennsylvania State University; North Carolina State University

David E. Davis (July 18, 1913 – October 31, 1994) was an ecologist and animal behaviorist noted for being the "founder of modern rat studies".

== Early life and education ==
Davis was born in Chicago and raised in Wilmette, Illinois. He received a Bachelor of Arts degree from Swarthmore College in 1935, then a Master of Science and PhD at Harvard University in 1939. Davis completed a postdoctoral fellowship at the University of Chicago, where he studied the behavior of chickens under L. V. Domm.

== Career ==
From 1941 to 1943, Davis investigated the hosts of yellow fever in Brazil for the Rockefeller Foundation. He also spent two years studying typhus in Texas.

For 13 years, Davis worked as an assistant professor at the Johns Hopkins School of Hygiene and Public Health, where he started the Rodent Ecology Project. His early fieldwork included trapping & marking of wild brown rats on Maryland farms to study their survival rates & population dynamics. Through systematic research, he debunked the myth that there was one rat per person in New York City and placed the rat population at around 250,000. Davis' research showed a constant supply of food & harborage determined the upper limit of the rat population & that killing rats through poison alone was ineffective, as eliminated individuals were quickly replaced. Davis also researched the spread of the bubonic plague through rodents.

He co-founded the Wildlife Disease Association alongside Carlton M. Herman in 1951 and later served as its president.

He later became a professor at Pennsylvania State University, then chairman of zoology at North Carolina State University. During his career, he published three books and 230 papers on behavioural ecology and physiology of aggression.
