= George Roscoe Davis =

American lawyer

George Roscoe Davis was a Washington, DC lawyer.

== Biography ==
In the late 1800s, he moved from Maine to Washington, DC to attend classes at George Washington University where in 1894 he became a charter member of the Columbian University chapter of Theta Delta Chi. That same year, George R. Davis was awarded both the Staughton Prize for excellence in the Latin language and literature and the Elton Prize for excellence in the Greek language and literature. In 1895 he also won the Ruggles Prize for Excellence in Mathematics and was the sole recipient of a Bachelor of Arts degree awarded by the university that session.

After graduation George R. Davis worked as a lawyer for the Washington Pension Bureau and later for the income tax administration of the United States Treasury. In 1922, he partnered a new law firm with Marion De Vries. In 1926, he helped argue the prohibition/customs case Ford v. US, 273 U.S. 593 before the Supreme Court.

Served on the Supreme Council for the Southern Jurisdiction Scottish Rite of Free Masonry.
