= David Davies (Independent minister and magazine editor) =

Welsh Independent minister (died 1807)

David Davies (died 1807) was a Welsh Independent minister, and editor of 'Y Geirgrawn'. He is thought to have grown up in the Llanybydder area, Carmarthenshire. He is known to have been studying at the academy in Swansea in 1786. By 1787 however, he was ordained and pastor of the church at Pen-y-Graig and of Capel Sul, Kidwelly. He subsequently (about 1790) moved to Holywell, where he stayed until 1800. It was there he published his radical magazine 'Y Geirgrawn' (nine numbers, Feb — Oct 1796). Its controversial views are known to have caused upset amongst the authorities and his congregation, to the extent that surviving letters on the subject speak of ‘unhappy misunderstandings’ which ‘went on for years’. On leaving Holywell in 1802 he moved to Welshpool, and then, in 1803 to Stoneway, Bridgnorth.

He died in 1807, and was buried in Bridgnorth chapel.
