= David Christopher Davies (missionary) =

Welsh missionary (1878–1958)

David Christopher Davies, known as Christy Davies (1878–1958) was a Welsh missionary, and representative of the Baptist Missionary Society (B.M.S.). His parents were John and Elizabeth Davies of Clydach, Glamorganshire. He attended a local Calfaria Baptist Church where his father was the church treasurer, and a deacon. The church pastor was T. Valentine Evans (father of Sir (David) Emrys Evans).

Christopher began his career helping in his family's grocery store. He then worked for a while as a tailor's apprentice in Ystalyfera, and was also baptised in a local Church. Completing his apprenticeship, he moved to work in Swansea, and then in Cardiff, and then for Colmers of Bath. While in Bath, where he attended Hay Hill Church, he decided to enter training for the ministry. He commenced his course, at Spurgeon's College, in 1902. It was whilst still a student-pastor, at Thorpe-le-Soken, that he felt called to work as a missionary. B.M.S stationed him in the Congo, in Yalemba (not far from the mouth of the River Aruwimi). It is said the natives there revered him deeply, and called him Molembia. He translated portions of the New Testament into local languages (Heso and Lingala) for them, and composed hymns in their own languages (which they sung together to Welsh tunes). Later the B.M.S. transferred him to 'Leopoldville' (now known as Kinshasa), a developing urban area, where concentrated on the new (Lingala speaking) arrivals of the Bangala tribe.

Returning to Wales in 1933 (on account of ill health) he continued to work, arranging summer schools. He later was stationed at the Aberystwyth Theological College, and then in the Cilgwyn area, Newcastle Emlyn.

He retired in 1943, and lived in Mumbles until his death.
