= David Thomas Davies =

Welsh dramatist

David Thomas Davies (1876–1962) was a Welsh dramatist. He was son of Thomas and Martha Davies. He received education at Gelli School, Ystrad, Rhondda Valley, and at Thomas James's School, Llandysul, Cardiganshire, before moving to study at the University College of Wales in Aberystwyth. His father had hoped that he would enter the ministry, but, on graduating in 1903, he decided to enter the teaching profession, and accepted a post at the Central Foundation School in London. There he became familiar with popular and contemporary English plays, and joined the new generation of Welsh dramatists such as Robert Griffith Berry, William John Gruffydd, and J.O. Francis.

During World War I he served with the Royal Welch Fusiliers in France, after which he moved to live in Pontypridd, and worked as an inspector of schools under the Ministry of Education.

He retired in 1936 and moved to Porthcawl, and then, in 1954, to Swansea. He died in Swansea in 1962, and was buried in Glyntaf cemetery, Pontypridd.

His writings include numerous short plays, and a number of full-length plays, such as; 'Ble ma fa?' (1913), 'Ephraim Harris' (1914), 'Castell Martin' (1920), 'Y Pwyllgor' (1920), and 'Pelenni Pitar' (1925).
