= Balhannah =

- Town
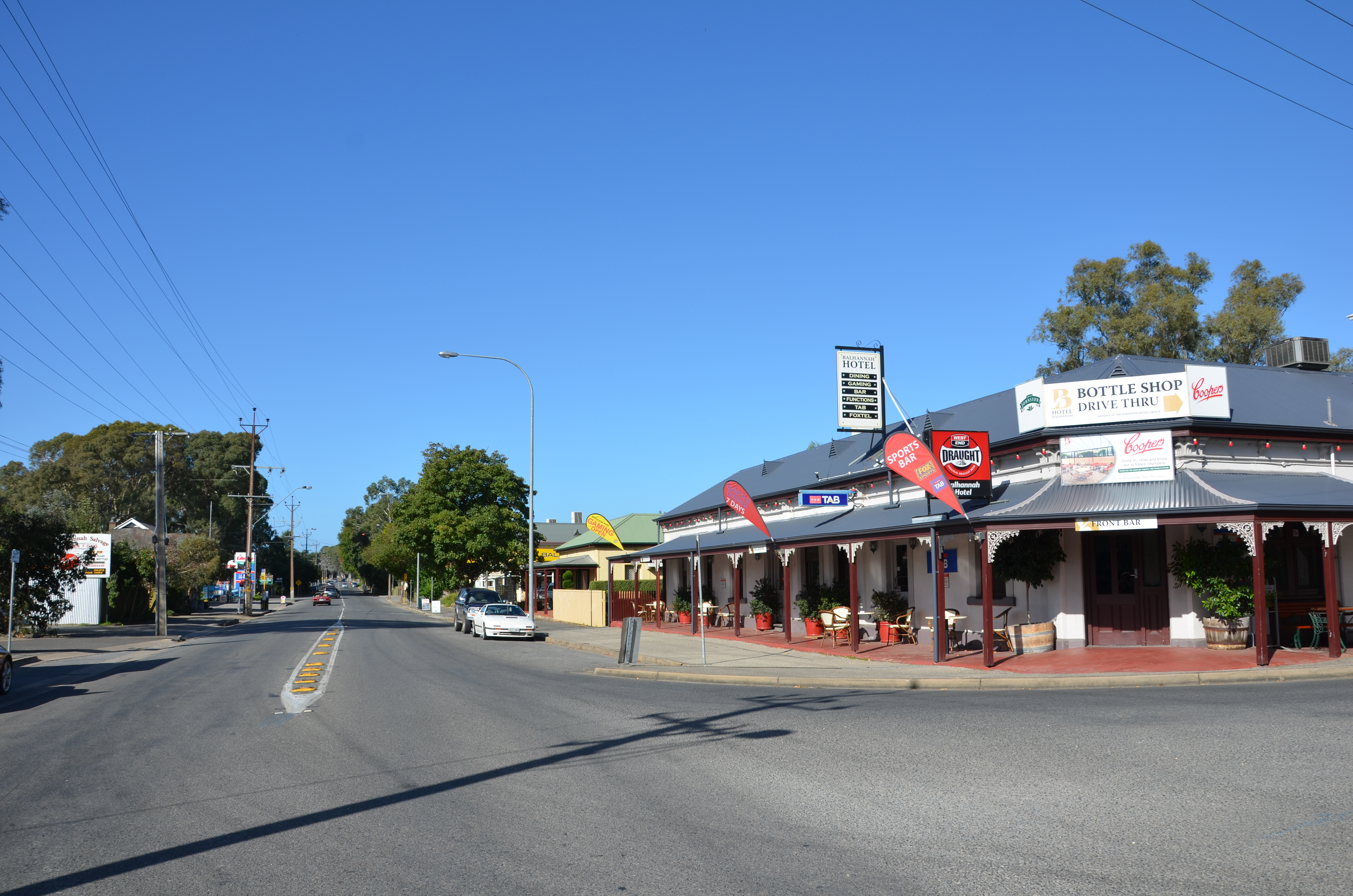
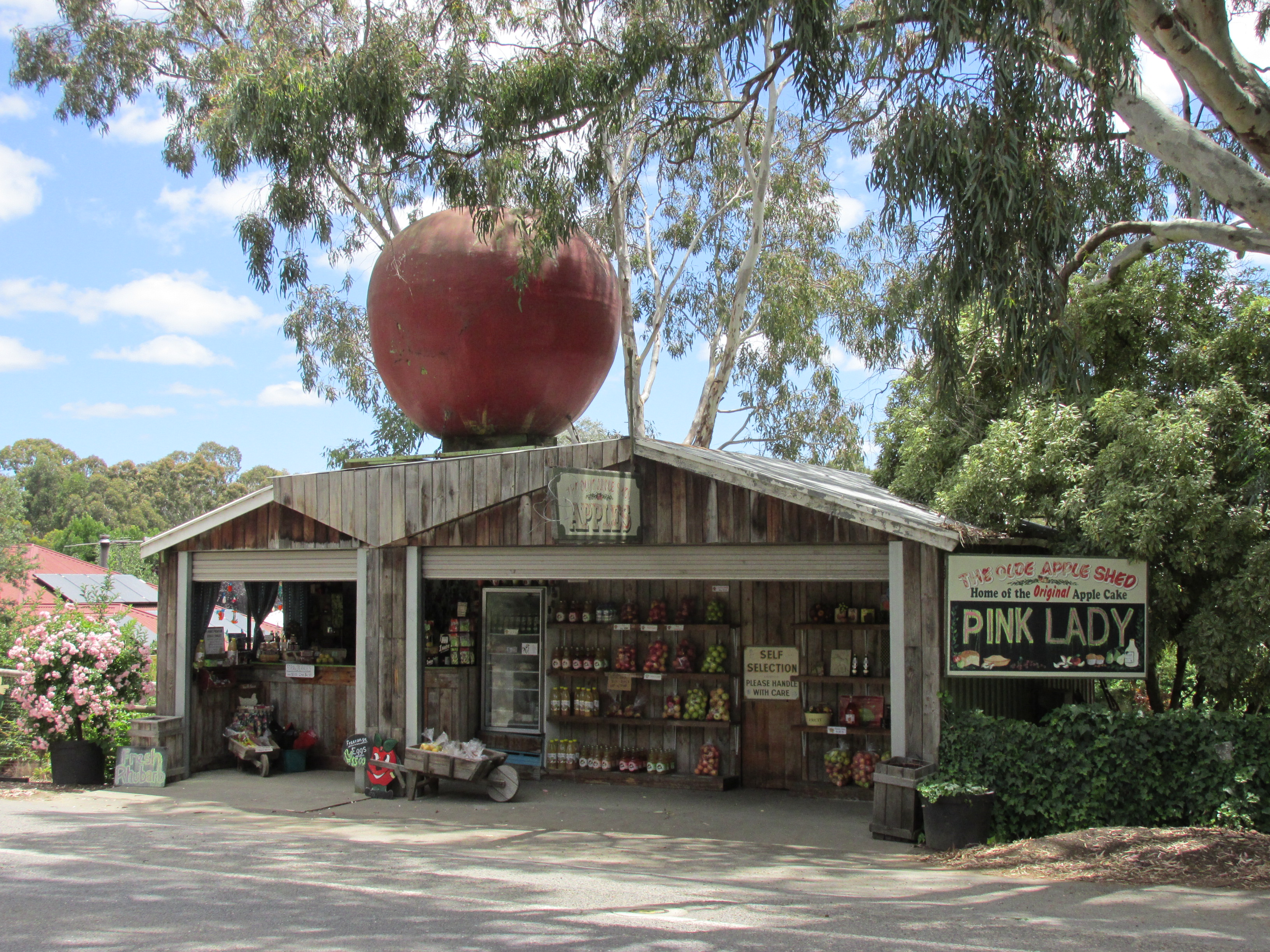
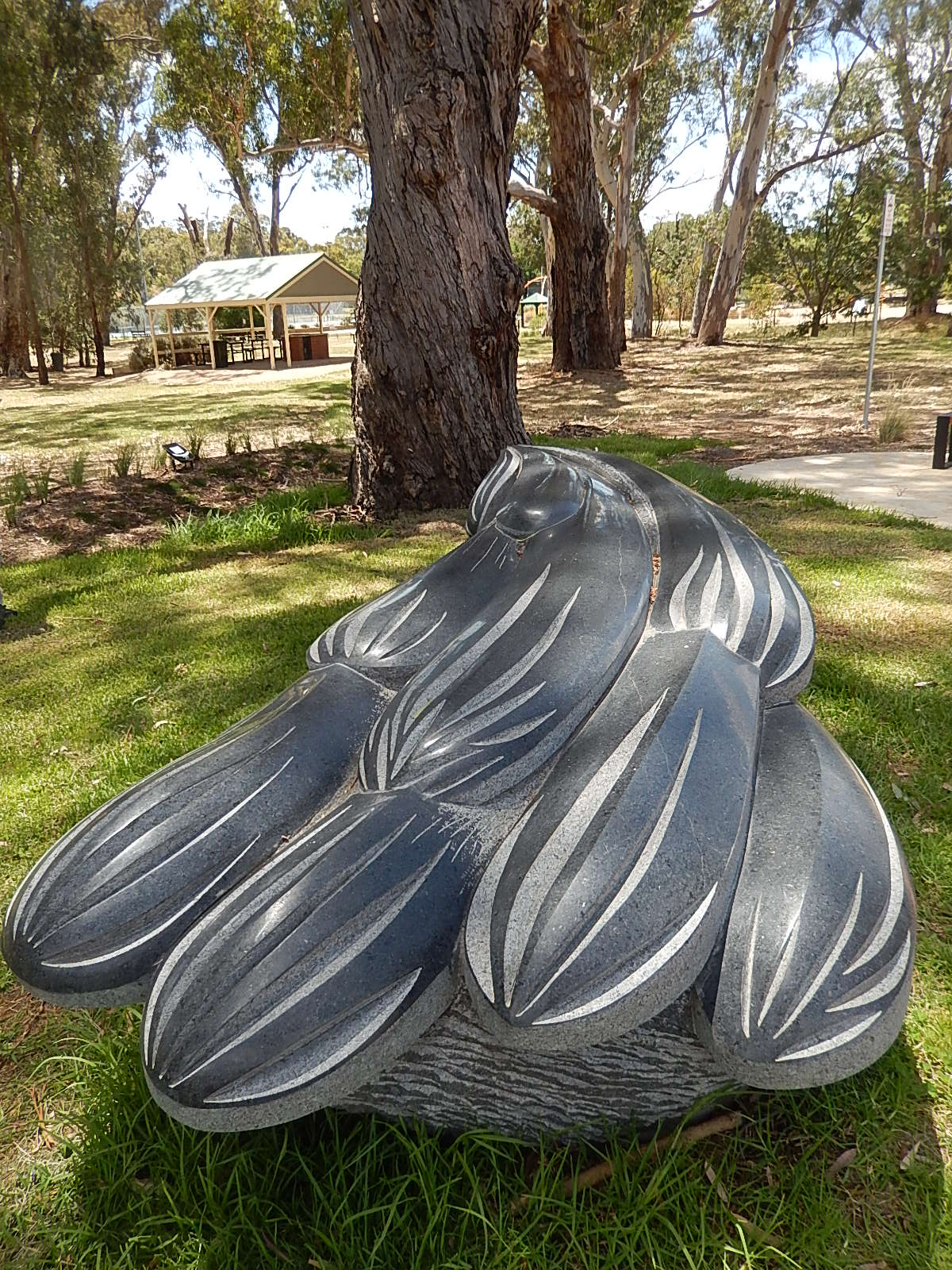
- Clockwise from top left: Balhannah pub, aerial view of Balhannah, sculpture in a local park, and a local apple shed.

- Coordinates: 34°59′S 138°49′E
- Country: Australia
- State: South Australia
- Region: Adelaide Hills
- LGA: Adelaide Hills Council
- Location: 30 km (19 mi) SE of Adelaide
- Established: 1839

Government
  - State electorate: Kavel
  - Federal division: Mayo

Population
  - Total: 1,660 (UCL 2021)
Localities around Balhannah
| Carey Gully | Lenswood | Oakbank |
| Mount George | Balhannah | Nairne |
| Bridgewater | Hahndorf | Littlehampton |

Balhannah is a town in the Adelaide Hills about 30 km southeast of Adelaide, the capital of South Australia. It was established in 1839 as a farming community by James Turnbull Thomson, who built the first hotel. The town soon grew to incorporate two once adjoining towns: Gilleston (named for Osmond Gilles) and Blythetown, named for James Blythe, another Scottish settler.

It is on the main interstate railway between Adelaide and Melbourne. In the past it was the junction for a branch line that ran up the Onkaparinga Valley and beyond to Birdwood and Mount Pleasant.

Much of Balhannah is along Onkaparinga Valley Road, although there are some other residential streets, and Greenhill Road terminates near the town centre. One of the larger businesses in the town is a long-established hardware store, now part of the Mitre 10 chain. The fruit cold store built in 1914 was one of the first in Australia and is still in use. Features Kidman Flower Co, a Native Flower Farm that allows tourists and is home to Nepenthe Winery and Shaw + Smith Winery.
