= David Davies (Baptist minister) =

Welsh Baptist minister and college tutor

David Davies(2 March 1794 – 19 March 1856) was a Welsh Baptist minister. Davies was born at Steynton, Pembrokeshire, the youngest of six known children of Benjamin (d. 1816) and Mary (née Owen), and was christened ("registered") at Narberth (20 April 1794), where his father officiated as a Welsh Baptist minister. David also became a minister. In 1818 he is known to have begun studying at Abergavenny Baptist College, and to have moved to study at Stepney Academy two years later. He was ordained, in 1822, as an assistant pastor at Evesham, before becoming pastor of the church. In 1837 he accepted an invitation to become minister of Bethesda Chapel, which his father founded, in Haverfordwest, and in 1839 was appointed head of the St. Thomas Green Baptist Academy there (which he is said to have founded). About this time he married - his wife being named Elizabeth, from Worcester. They are known to have had two daughters, born at Haverfordwest: Fanny Owen Davies (born 1839) and Mary A. Davies (born in the early 1840s). He died on 19 March 1856, Haverfordwest.

Fanny married a James Chance, at Old Swinford, on 27 December 1864. They ran a workhouse in Kings Norton, Worcs., where she was described as "matron". James died in 1877 and Fanny remarried to a Charles Cooke, at Epsom, in 1881. She died in 1883. Nothing more is presently known of her sister Mary.
