= Mount George Davis =

Mountain in the state of California

- Mount Thoreau
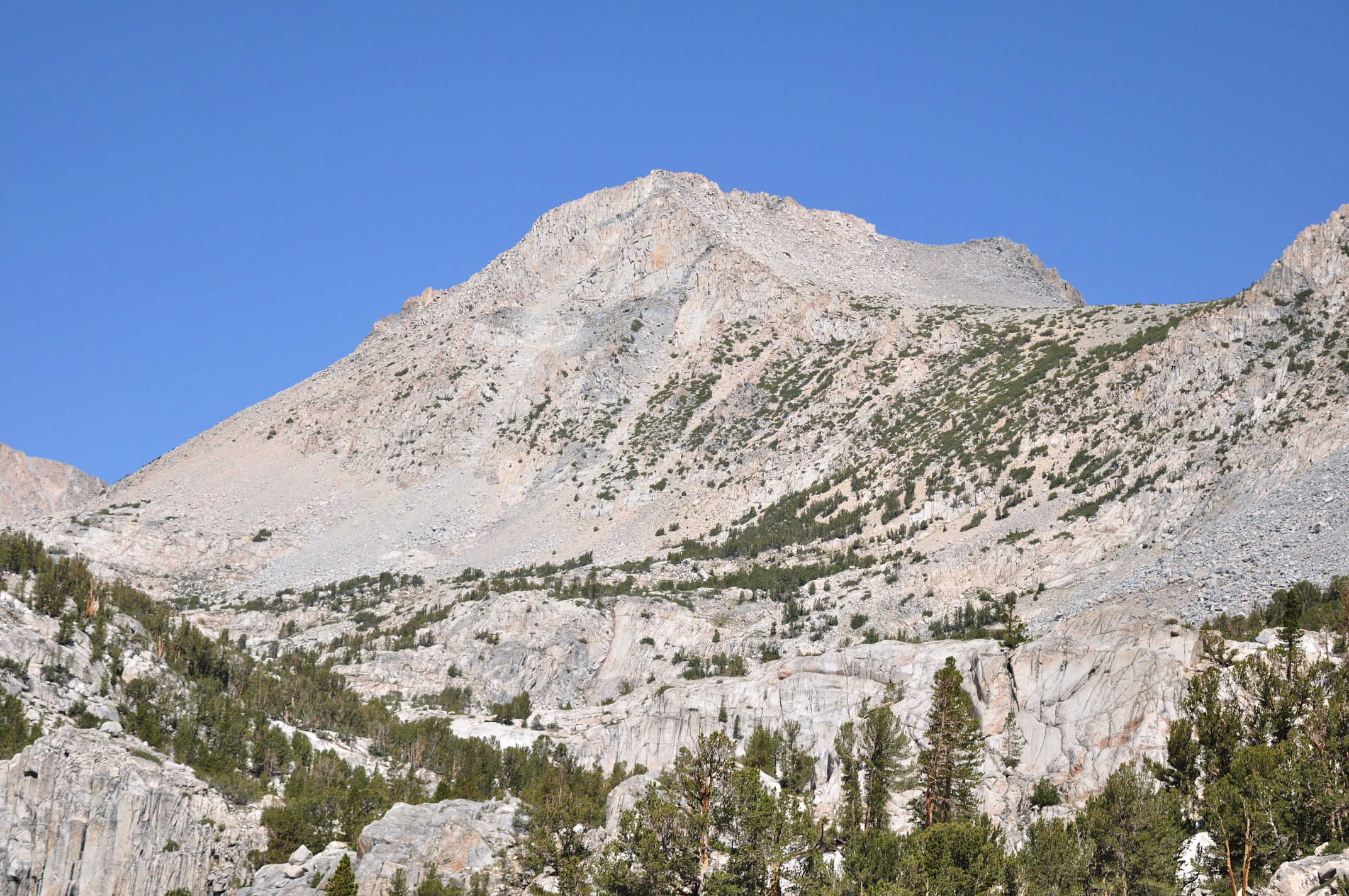
- East-southeast aspect

Highest point
- Elevation: 12,713 ft (3,875 m)
- Prominence: 660 ft (201 m)
- Isolation: 1.32 mi (2.12 km)
- Coordinates: 37°13′30″N 118°39′47″W

Naming
- Etymology: George R. Davis

Geography
- Location within California Location within the United States
- Interactive map of Mount George Davis
- Country: United States of America
- State: California
- County: Inyo
- Protected area: John Muir Wilderness
- Parent range: Sierra Nevada
- Topo map: USGS Mount Darwin

Geology
- Rock age: Cretaceous
- Mountain type: Fault block
- Rock type: Granodiorite

Climbing
- First ascent: 1933
- Easiest route: class 2

Mount George Davis, also known as Mount Thoreau, is a mountain in California, United States.

== Description ==
Mount George Davis is a 12,713-foot-elevation (3,875-meter) summit located in the John Muir Wilderness and approximately one mile (1.6 km) east of the crest of the Sierra Nevada mountain range. It is situated in Inyo County as well as Inyo National Forest. Precipitation runoff from the peak drains east into Bishop Creek which is a tributary of the Owens River. Topographic relief is significant as the summit rises 1,970 feet (600 meters) above the North Fork of Bishop Creek in one-half mile (0.8 km). The summit ranks as the 235th-highest peak in California. The first ascent of the summit was made by Neil Ruge and John Cahill on July 9, 1933, via the north fork of Lamarck Creek. The nearest higher neighbor is Mount Emerson, 1.3 miles (2.1 km) to the north.

== Etymology ==
Chester Versteeg and Virgil Sisson of the Sierra Club applied the toponym in 1940 to honor USGS geographer George Robert Davis (1877–1922). His mapping accomplishments include the Mount Whitney, Mount Goddard, Bakersfield, and McKittrick topographic quadrangles, Yosemite National Park, Mount Rainier National Park in Washington, as well as many other areas in the High Sierra. In 2014, wilderness enthusiasts who were unaware of the long-standing unofficial name proposed the toponym "Mount Thoreau" to honor 19th-century author Henry David Thoreau who was a friend of Ralph Waldo Emerson, the namesake of nearby Mount Emerson. This landform's toponym has not been officially adopted by the U.S. Board on Geographic Names, and it will remain unofficial as long as the USGS policy of not adopting new toponyms in designated wilderness areas remains in effect.

== Climate ==
According to the Köppen climate classification system, Mount George Davis is located in an alpine climate zone. Weather fronts coming off the Pacific Ocean travel east toward the Sierra Nevada mountains. As fronts approach, they are forced upward by the peaks (orographic lift), causing them to drop their moisture in the form of rain or snowfall onto the range.

== Gallery ==
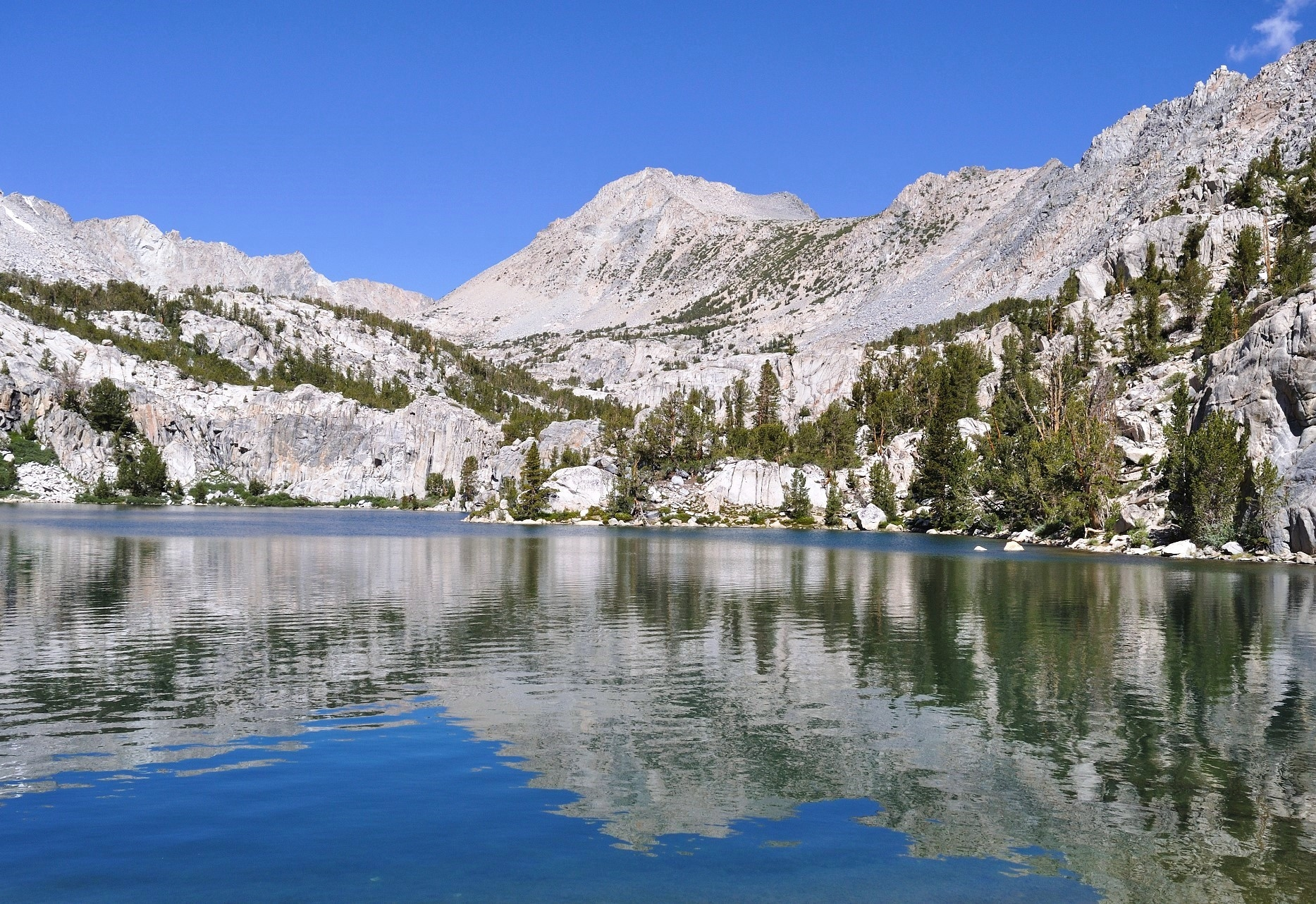
Mount George Davis from Lower Lamarck Lake

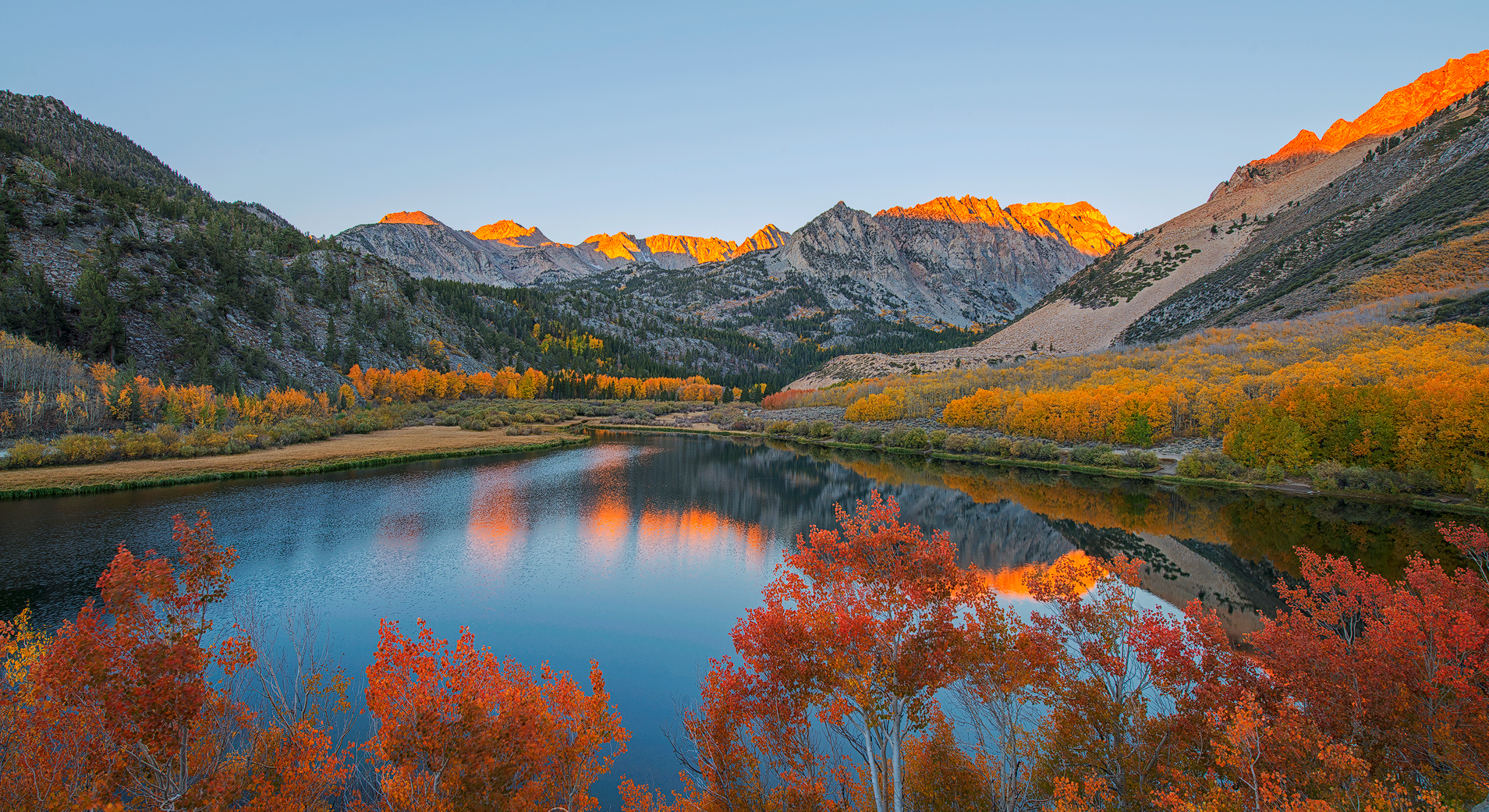
Mount George Davis (right of center) from North Lake

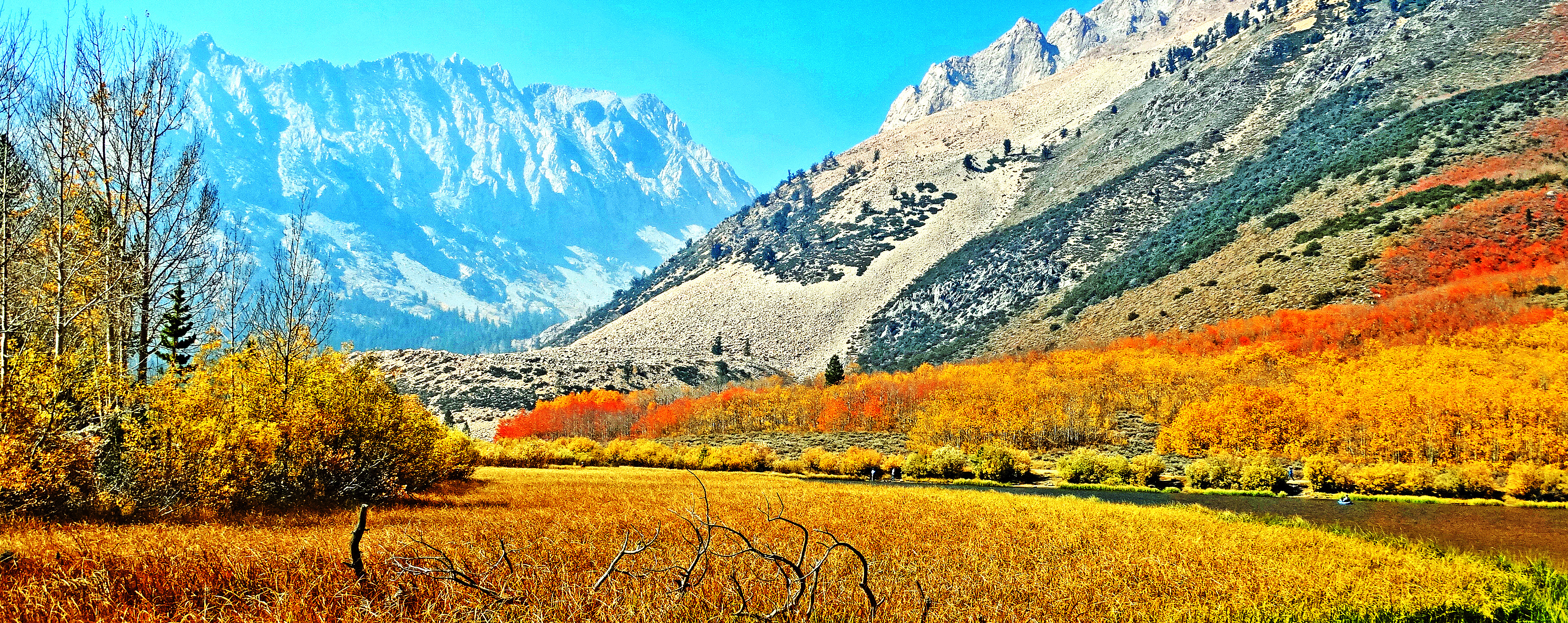
Mount George Davis (left of center)

== See also ==
- List of mountain peaks of California
