= Mount George, South Australia =

Mount George South Australia
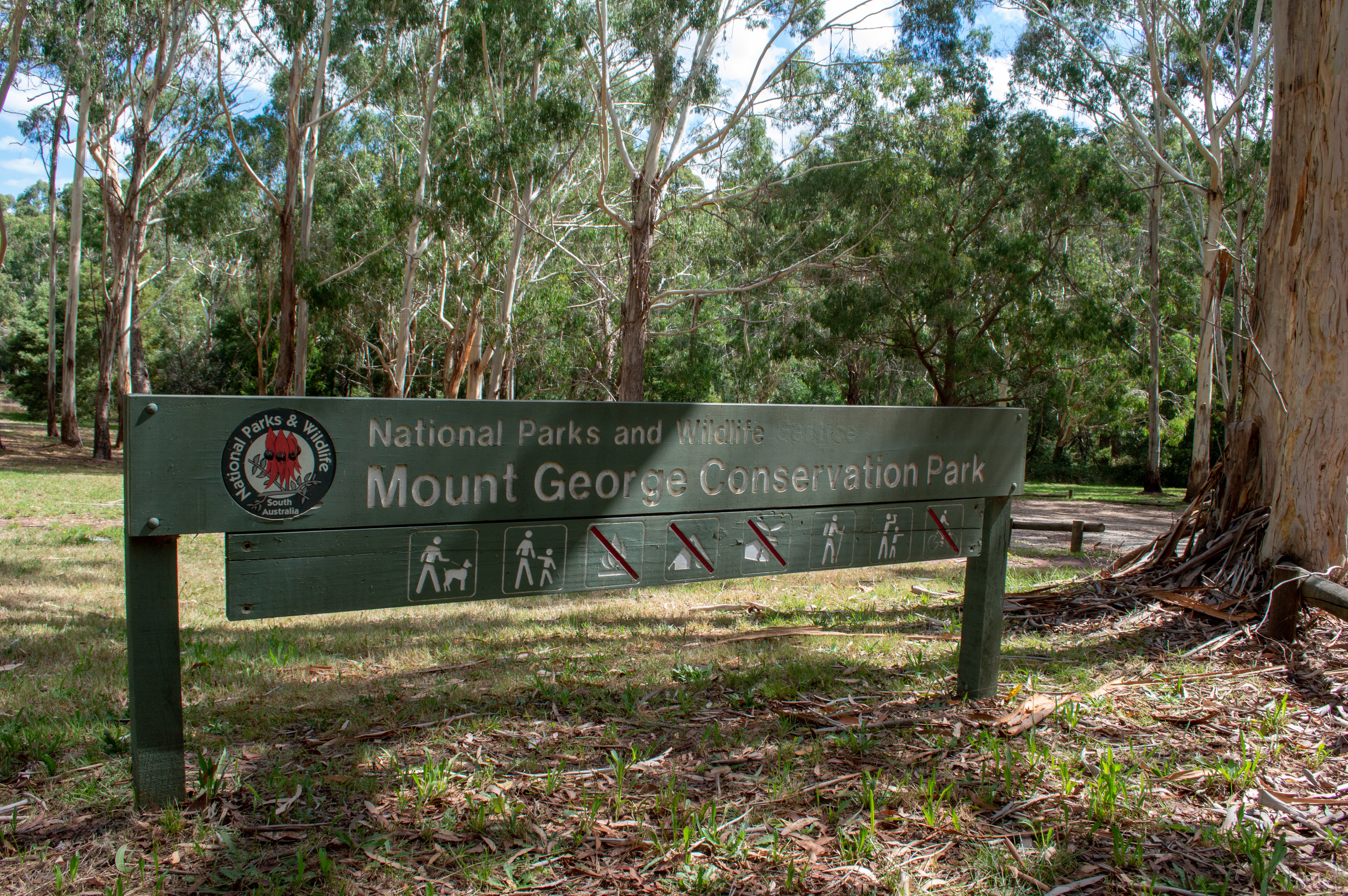
- Mount George Conservation Park

- Coordinates: 34.99°S 138.76°E
- Population: 276 (SAL 2021)
- Established: 1999
- Postcode(s): 5155
- Time zone: ACST (UTC+9:30)
  - Summer (DST): ACST (UTC+10:30)
- Location: 17 km (11 mi) SE of Adelaide
- LGA(s): Adelaide Hills Council
- State electorate(s): Kavel
- Federal division(s): Mayo
Mean max temp	Mean min temp	Annual rainfall
15.2 °C; 59 °F	8.5 °C; 47 °F	1,053.8 mm 41.5 in
Localities around Mount George:
Piccadilly	Carey Gully
Stirling	Mount George	Balhannah
Aldgate	Bridgewater	Verdun
- Footnotes: Locations; Adjoining localities

Mount George is a locality in the Australian state of South Australia located about 17 kilometres (11 mi) south-east of the state capital of Adelaide.

It was established in 1999 with its name being derived from the Mount George Conservation Park. Its boundaries were varied in August 2002 when some land was added to the adjoining locality of Stirling and again in August 2005 when land was added to Balhannah.

The Mount George Conservation Park has a stretch of the Heysen Trail passing through it.

It was home to Alexander Downer and his family until 2014.

The principal land use in the locality is “rural living” which is a mix of farming and residential development. Some land within the locality has been proclaimed for conservation purposes as part of the following protected areas - the Kenneth Stirling Conservation Park and the Mount George Conservation Park.

Mount George is located within the federal division of Mayo, the state electoral district of Kavel and the local government area of the Adelaide Hills Council.
