= George Lawrence Davis =

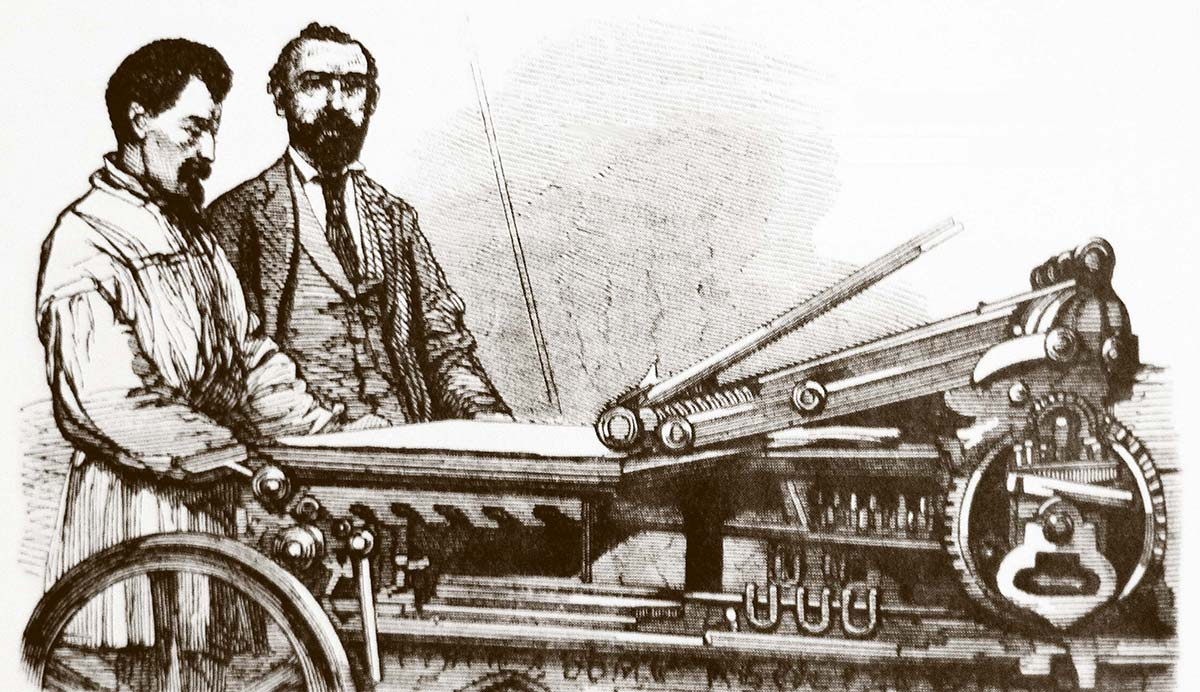
- George Lawrence Davis (on the right) working at his printing press
- Born: 1830; Monmouth (Wales)
- Died: 1894 (aged 63–64); Caldes de Montbui (Barcelona)
- Occupation: Missionary

George Lawrence Davis (Monmouth, Wales, 1830 – Caldes de Montbui, 9 January 1894) was a Welsh missionary and educator. He developed important evangelical, educational, and healthcare work in Catalonia during the second half of the 19th century, being the promoter of the Evangelical Hospital of Barcelona and various schools.

== Biography ==
=== Arrival in Spain and time in Barcelona ===
List of members of the church in Ferlandina street.

He arrived in Madrid from Leominster (Herefordshire) in 1863. After travelling through different parts of Spain with an armored cart full of Bibles, he settled in the town of Gràcia (Barcelona). There he actively worked on the foundation of schools for children and adults, and in a printing press he founded himself, he edited several cultural and religious magazines such as La Aurora de la Gracia.

During that time, he founded the church at 47 Ferlandina street, affiliated with the Brethren assemblies, alongside other missionaries such as Henry Payne. In the healthcare and social aid field, he founded a hospital called "El Buen Samaritano" (The Good Samaritan), an institution that would become the embryo of the current Hospital Evangèlic de Barcelona.

=== Relocation to Caldes de Montbui ===
Seeking the remedies of the thermal water spas for health reasons, he moved to Caldes de Montbui (Vallès Oriental). In this town, he continued his educational work by founding an institution popularly known as the Escola dels pobres (School of the poor), which became a key entity in the town's literacy. In parallel, he started the community that today is the Evangelical Church of Caldes de Montbui.

== Work and educational legacy ==
His impact on the education of the working classes was highly notable. In just seven years, over 10,500 students of different ages, from young children to adults, passed through the classrooms created by George Lawrence. A modern and open pedagogy was offered in these evangelical centers. The missionary fervently believed that "schooling was the great hope of the country," which is why he dedicated a large part of his life to literacy.

In recognition of his social and educational work, the town of Caldes de Montbui created the George Lawrence Route to spread his history. Likewise, following a popular consultation, the city council decided to change the name of the old street named after the military man Espartero to George Lawrence Street, exactly the street where the church he started is located.
