= Forest Range, South Australia =

Forest Range South Australia
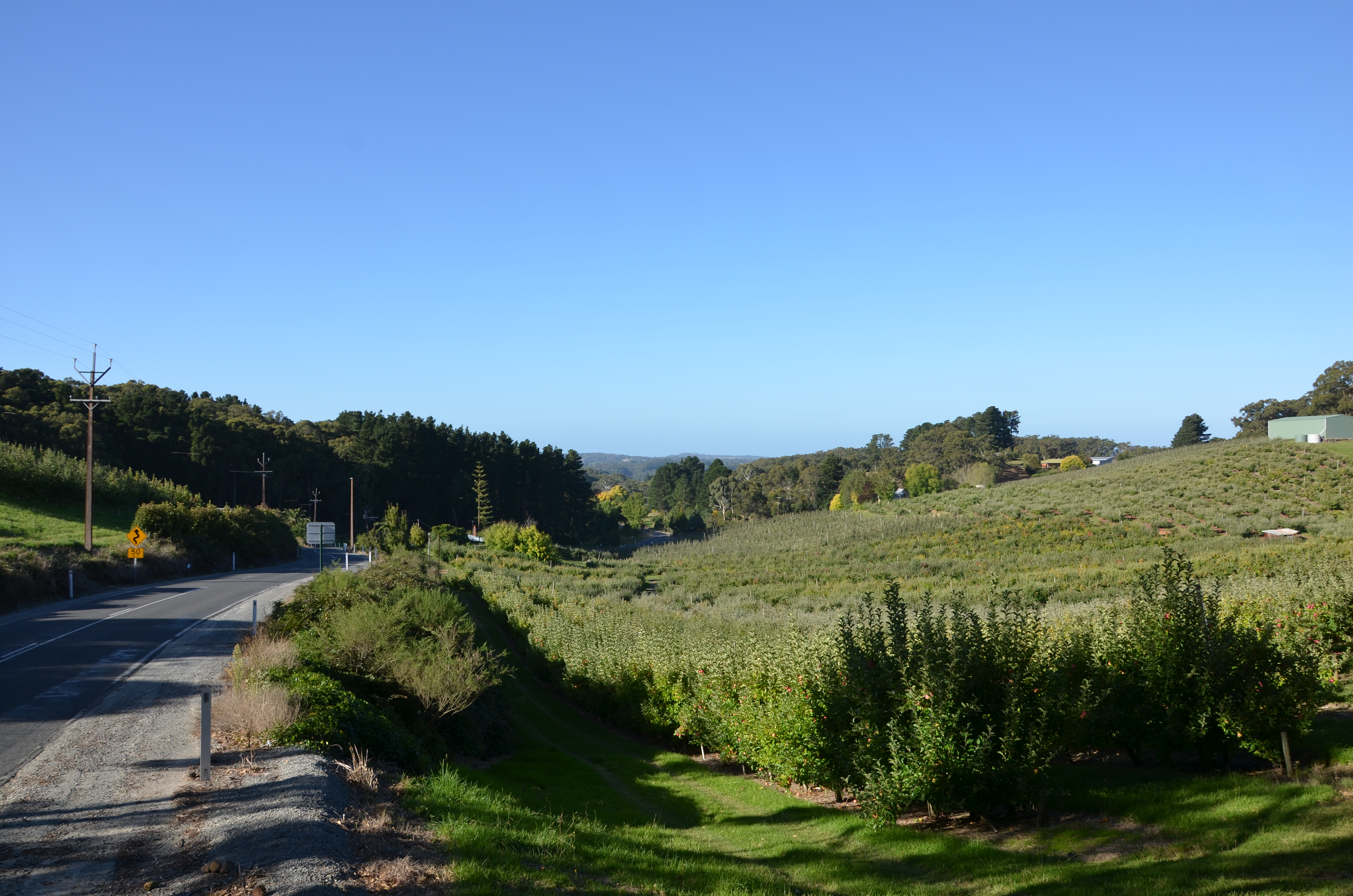
- Orchards near Forest Range

- Coordinates: 34°55′S 138°48′E
- Population: 290 (SAL 2021)
- Established: 1854
- Postcode(s): 5139
- Elevation: 473 m (1,552 ft)
- Location: 19 km (12 mi) from Adelaide
- LGA(s): Adelaide Hills Council
- State electorate(s): Morialta
- Federal division(s): Mayo

Forest Range is a small town in the Adelaide Hills, South Australia.

== History ==
Forest Range was settled by timber sawyers, cutting stringybark trees for timber and charcoal. In 1854 there was a minor gold rush with a larger gold rush in the 1880s. Gold-seekers took over 6000 ounces of gold. Timber-cutting gave way to fruit and vegetable farming as land was cleared. Forest Range initially comprised the whole district including Lenswood, until 1917 when Lenswood was proclaimed. Initially land clearing (and gold) formed the major industries, but this soon gave way to farming. Farming in those times was mixed, with fruit and vegetables farmed for local or Adelaide use. In the 20th century farming became more specialised and apples, pears and cherries became the main industries. The Forest Range Fruitgrowers' Co-Operative Society was one of the main sites of apple packing and storage until it was absorbed by the nearby Lenswood Cold Store in the 1950s.

Forest Range had a number of businesses and community buildings, but over time, these have all disappeared. These included hotels, timber sawing mills, shops, and churches. The Forest Range Hall (at the oval) and the Forest Range Post Office remain the last community buildings, however there are numerous orchard sheds and private cold stores. There is a community park on Lobethal Road, near The Ford. There are two war memorials on Central Recreation Ground commemorating each world war.

== Facilities ==
- The James Shea Memorial Oval

(Forest Range Oval)

- The Central Recreation Park

(previously Common Ground)
