= Hindmarsh Valley (disambiguation) =

Hindmarsh Valley is a valley in the Australian state of South Australia.

Hindmarsh Valley may also refer to

- Hindmarsh Valley, South Australia, a locality
- Hindmarsh Valley greenhood, a species of orchid found in South Australia
- Hindmarsh Valley Reservoir, a water storage facility in South Australia

== See also ==
- Hindmarsh (disambiguation)
