= Hindmarsh (disambiguation) =

Hindmarsh is a surname.

Hindmarsh may also refer to:

== Places ==
=== Antarctica ===
- Hindmarsh Dome, an ice plateau on the Fletcher Ice Rise in Antarctica

=== Australia ===
The following places are either named after or derived from John Hindmarsh, the first Governor of South Australia.

==== South Australia ====
- County of Hindmarsh, a cadastral unit
- Division of Hindmarsh, an electoral division for the Australian House of Representatives
- Hindmarsh, South Australia, a suburb of Adelaide
  - Hindmarsh Stadium, a soccer stadium located in the suburb
  - Town of Hindmarsh, a later corporate body based on the suburb
- Hindmarsh Island, an island near the mouth of the Murray River
- Hindmarsh River, a river
- Hindmarsh Square, a square in the city of Adelaide
- Hindmarsh Valley, a valley
- Hundred of Hindmarsh, a cadastral unit

==== Victoria ====
- Lake Hindmarsh, a lake
- Shire of Hindmarsh, a local government area

== See also ==
- Hindmarsh Valley (disambiguation)
- West Hindmarsh, South Australia
