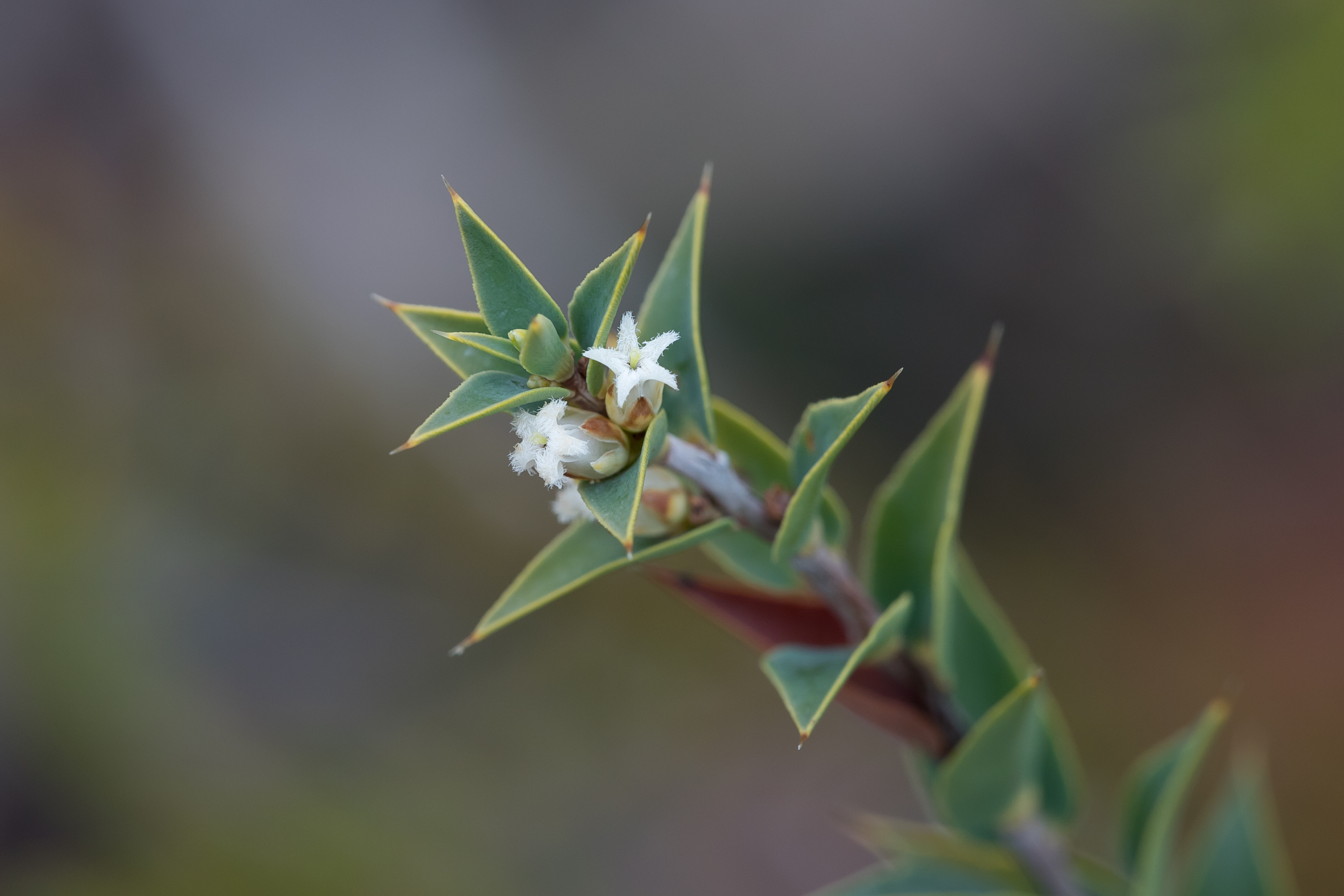
- In the Onkaparinga River National Park

Scientific classification
- Kingdom: Plantae
- Clade: Tracheophytes
- Clade: Angiosperms
- Clade: Eudicots
- Clade: Asterids
- Order: Ericales
- Family: Ericaceae
- Genus: Styphelia
- Species: S. rufa

Binomial name
- Styphelia rufa (Lindl.) F.Muell.
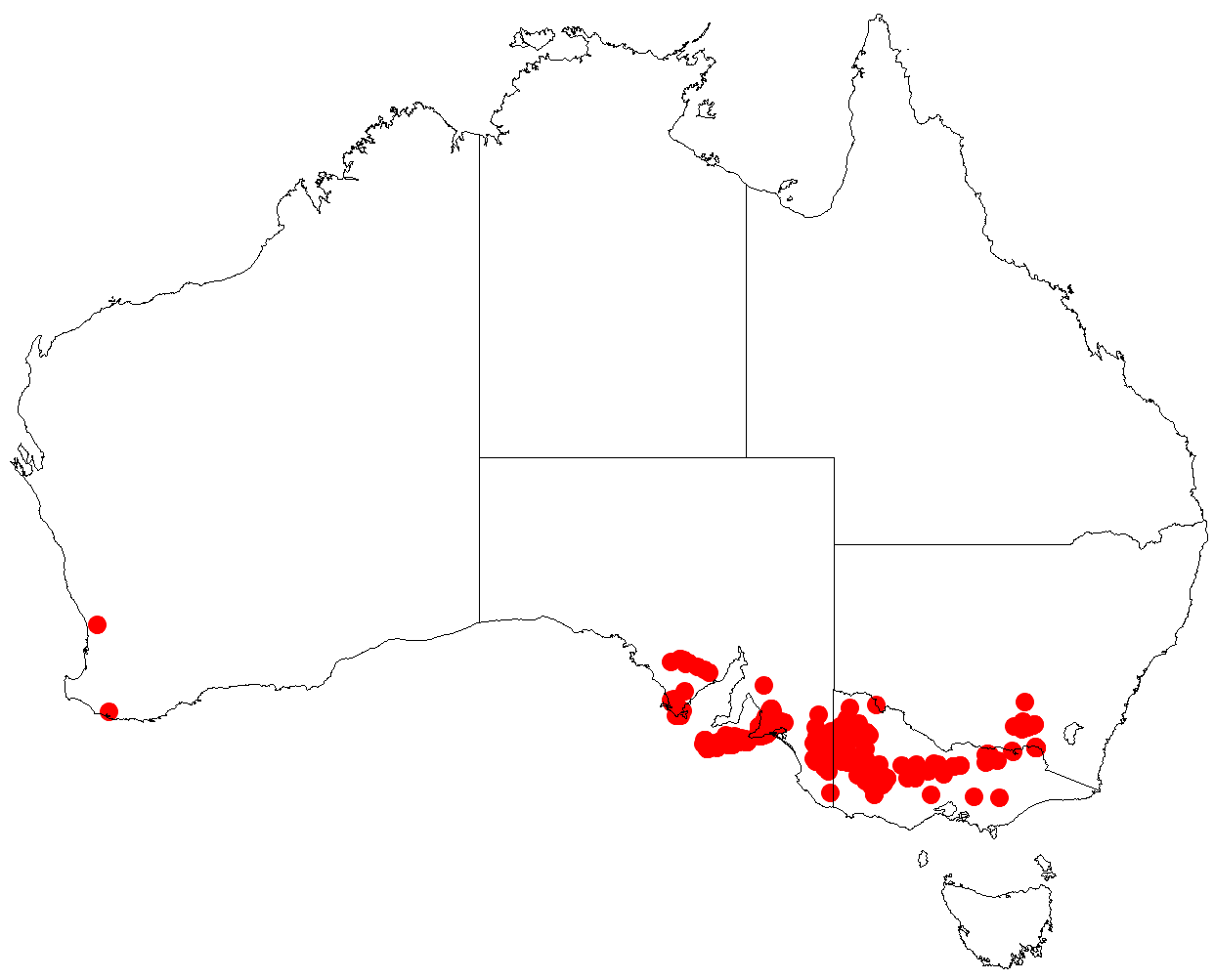
- Occurrence data from AVH

Synonyms
- Leucopogon rufus Lindl.; Leucopogon astrolomioides F.Muell.; Leucopogon dasystylis Sond.

= Styphelia rufa =

Species of plant

Styphelia rufa, commonly known as spoon-leaf beard-heath or ruddy bearded-heath, is a species of flowering plant in the heath family Ericaceae and is endemic to south-eastern continental Australia. It is an erect shrub with erect to spreading, egg-shaped leaves and white, tube-shaped flowers arranged in spikes in two to five leaf axils near the ends of branches.

== Description ==
Styphelia rufa is an erect shrub that typically grows to a height of 30–60 cm (12–24 in), its young branchlets sometimes covered with fine, soft hairs. The leaves are egg-shaped and erect to spreading, 6–12 mm (0.24–0.47 in) long and 2–5 mm (0.079–0.197 in) wide. The leaves are sometimes glabrous, otherwise covered with soft hairs, the lower side a paler shade of green, and there is a sharp bristle on the tip. The flowers are borne in spikes in two to five upper leaf axils, the spikes 6–9 mm (0.24–0.35 in) long, with egg-shaped to almost round bracteoles 1.4–2.0 mm (0.055–0.079 in) long at the base. The sepals are narrowly egg-shaped, 3.1–4.6 mm (0.12–0.18 in) long, the petals white, 5.3–6.6 mm (0.21–0.26 in) long and joined at the base, forming a tube, the lobes shorter than the petal tube. Flowering occurs from November to March, and the fruit is about 6 mm (0.24 in) long.

== Taxonomy ==
This species was first formally described in 1838 by John Lindley who gave it the name Leucopogon rufus in Thomas Mitchell's journal, Three Expeditions into the interior of Eastern Australia. In 1867, Ferdinand von Mueller transferred the species to Styphelia as S. rufa in his Fragmenta Phytographiae Australiae. The specific epithet (rufa) means "reddish".

== Distribution and habitat ==
Spoon-leaf beard-heath occurs in scattered populations in northern and north-eastern Victoria, extending into south-eastern South Australia and the far south of New South Wales. In usually grows in heath, but is also found in open forest and mallee scrub.
