= Mount Bold Dam =

Dam and reservoir in South Australia

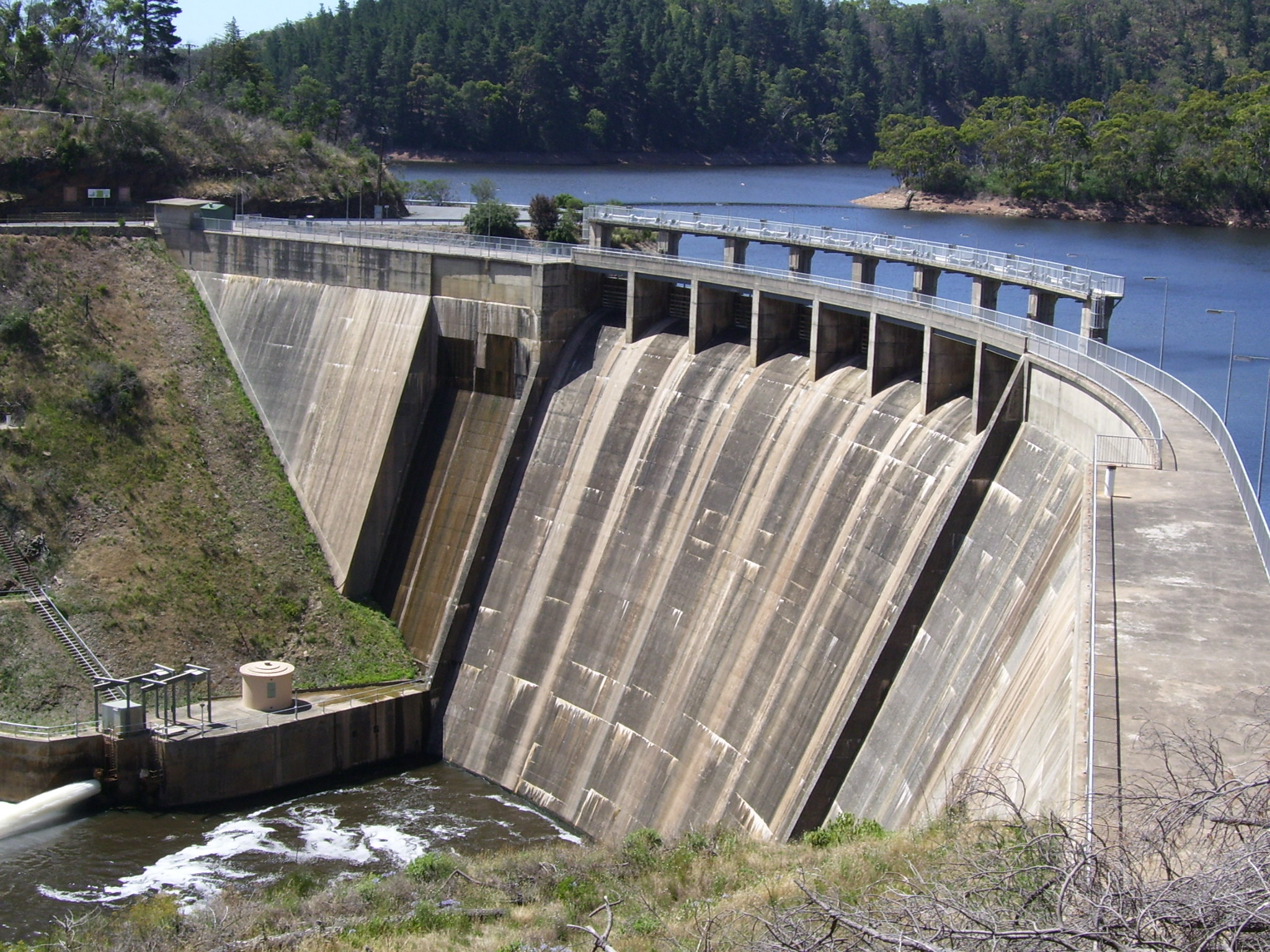
- The dam wall in 2009

- Location of the dam in South Australia
- Interactive map of Mount Bold Dam
- Country: Australia
- Location: South Australia
- Coordinates: 35°07′25″S 138°41′02″E
- Purpose: Water supply
- Status: Operational
- Construction began: 1932
- Opening date: 1938
- Construction cost: A$1.1 million
- Owner: Government of South Australia
- Operator: SA Water

Dam and spillways
- Type of dam: Arch and gravity dam
- Impounds: Onkaparinga River
- Height (foundation): 58 m (190 ft)
- Length: 232 m (761 ft)
- Dam volume: 105×10^{3} m^{3} (3.7×10^{6} cu ft)
- Spillway type: Controlled
- Spillway capacity: 388 m^{3}/s (13,700 cu ft/s)

Reservoir
- Creates: Mount Bold Reservoir
- Total capacity: 46.18 GL (37,440 acre⋅ft)
- Catchment area: 388 km^{2} (150 sq mi)
- Surface area: 305 ha (750 acres)
- Normal elevation: 235 m (771 ft) AHD

The Mount Bold Dam is an arch and gravity dam across the Onkaparinga River, located to the south of Adelaide, in South Australia. Completed in 1938, the resultant reservoir, the Mount Bold Reservoir, is the largest reservoir in South Australia, and was established to supply potable water for Adelaide and surrounding areas.

== Overview ==
Construction of the dam commenced in 1932 and was completed in 1938 at a cost of A$1.1 million. The concrete dam wall is 58 metres (190 ft) high and 232 metres (761 ft) long. When full, the reservoir has capacity of 46.18 gigalitres (37,440 acre⋅ft) and covers 305 hectares (750 acres), drawn from a catchment area of 388 square kilometres (150 sq mi). The controlled spillway has a flow capacity of 1,170 cubic metres per second (41,000 cu ft/s). The reservoir does not connect directly to the main reticulation system; rather, to maintain levels at Clarendon Weir, water is released only as required. Much of the water from Mount Bold will eventually end up in the Happy Valley Reservoir and used to supply parts of the Mount Lofty Ranges and also Adelaide.

A major renovation was completed in 1964 when the level of the dam was raised 6.4 metres (21 ft) to increase the reservoir's capacity by approximately 17 gigalitres (14,000 acre⋅ft). Although originally supplying its own electricity through a small conventional hydro-electricity plant, this was discontinued in 1961. However, Mount Bold is now considered a possible site for a future commercial mini-hydro generator.

In early June 2007, the South Australian Government began a scoping study into expanding the reservoir's capacity fivefold to 240 gigalitres (190,000 acre⋅ft) at an estimated cost of A$850 million. The plan was criticised by the Opposition as not providing any new water, and by ecologist David Paton as threatening surrounding wildlife.

On 26 September 2010, Mount Bold Reservoir was opened for the first time since 2005 after receiving large amounts of rainfall in the week leading up to the date. The resulting water flushed out the Onkaparinga Catchment, causing several flooded roads but removing debris which had been building up for many years.

== 2007 fire ==
A bushfire ravaged the Mount Bold Valley area, which includes the properties between Kangarilla and Echunga, during the second week of January 2007. The fire destroyed two houses, gutted over ten sheds and killed livestock and horses. Two people were injured and fencing was damaged. The fire started at dusk on 10 January and burnt ferociously into the night with conditions worsening. On the next day, the fire headed towards Echunga but was contained by CFS crews.

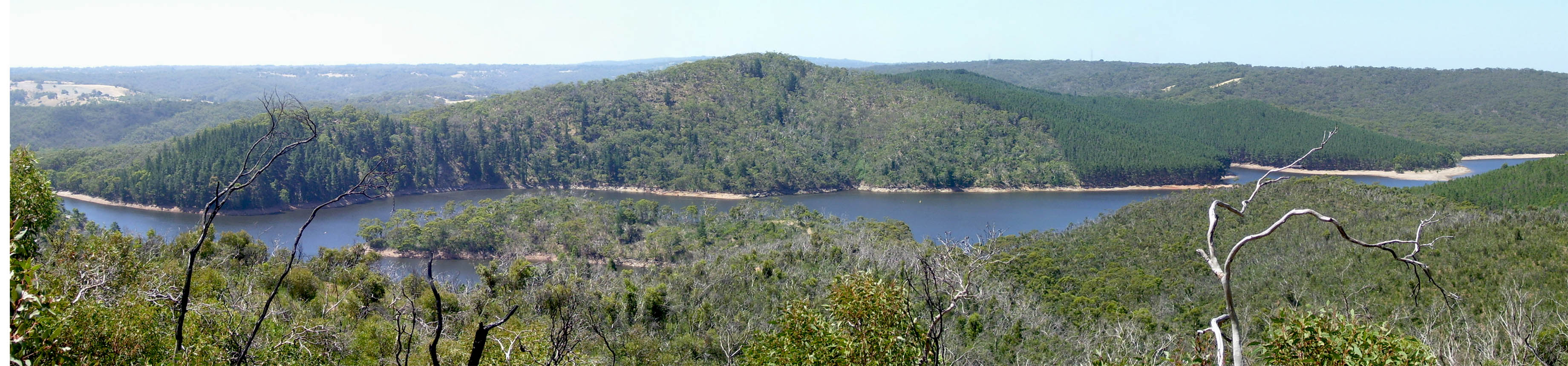
Panorama of western part of Mount Bold Reservoir and surrounds, looking north

== See also ==
- List of dams and reservoirs in South Australia
