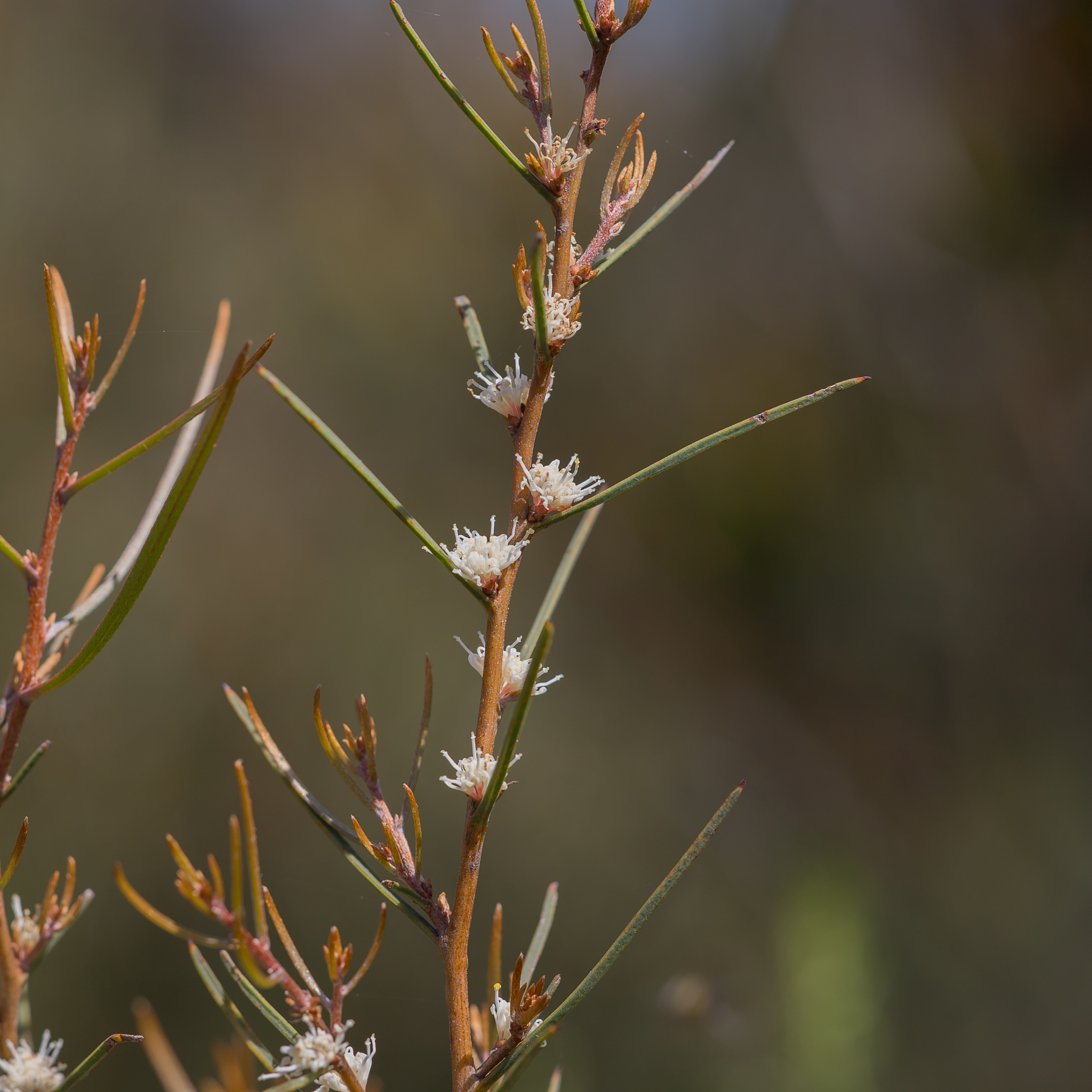

Scientific classification
- Kingdom: Plantae
- Clade: Tracheophytes
- Clade: Angiosperms
- Clade: Eudicots
- Order: Proteales
- Family: Proteaceae
- Genus: Hakea
- Species: H. carinata

Binomial name
- Hakea carinata F.Muell. ex. Meisn.
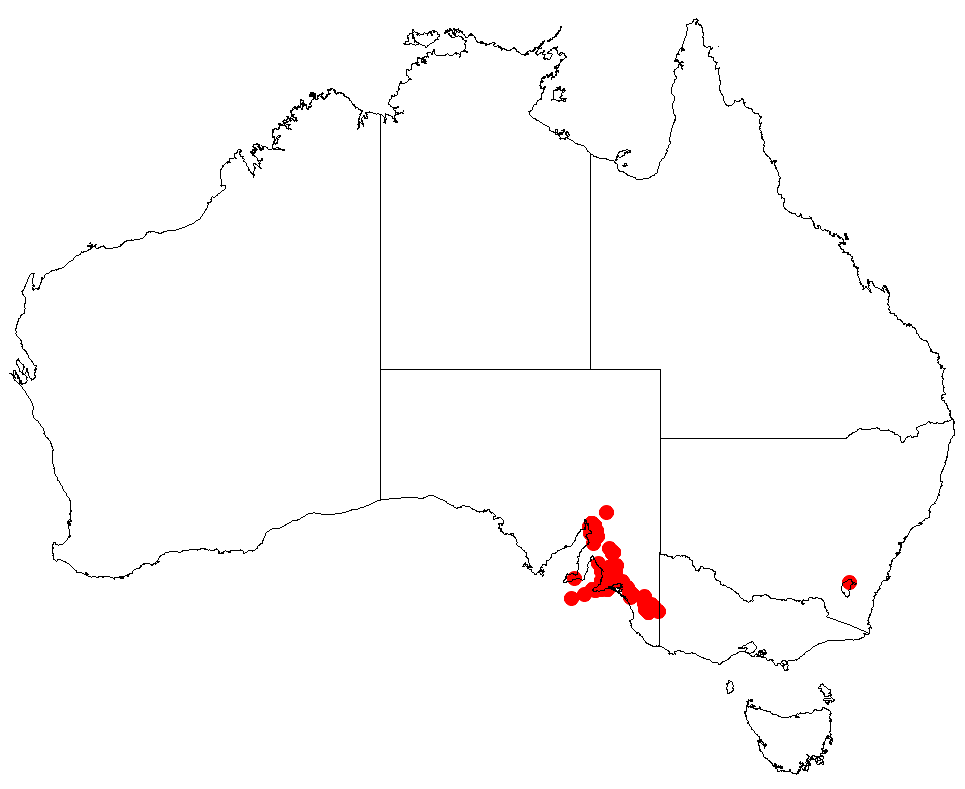
- Occurrence data from AVH

= Hakea carinata =

Species of shrub native to South Australia

Hakea carinata is a species in the family Proteaceae native to an area in South Australia. It is a frost hardy small to medium shrub adaptable to a range of free draining situations. Its prickly habit creates a good wildlife habitat.

== Description ==
Hakea carinata is an erect shrub typically growing to a height of 1.5 to 3 metres (4.9 to 9.8 ft). The flexible leaves are smooth, flat and linear, concave or triangular in cross-section 5 to 24 centimetres (2 to 9 in) long and 1 to 12 millimetres (0.0 to 0.5 in) wide with prominent marginal veins. Smaller branches are covered with flattened fine hairs at flowering, sometimes smooth. The single inflorescence consists of 8–24 cream-white flowers and appear in the leaf axils. The pink pedicels are smooth, sometimes with thinly sparsed silky hairs. The perianth is cream-white and the style 3 to 6 millimetres (0.118 to 0.236 in) long. The fruit have a short stem, narrowly oblong to egg-shaped 1.3 to 2.6 cm (0.51 to 1.02 in) long and 0.6 to 1.1 cm (0.24 to 0.43 in) wide with a long narrow straight or slightly curved beak toward the apex. The blackish-brown seeds are narrowly oblong to egg-shaped 1.0 to 1.8 cm (0.39 to 0.71 in) long and 4 to 6.5 mm (0.157 to 0.256 in) wide with a wing on each side. Flowers form in spring from September to October.

== Taxonomy and naming ==
Hakea carinata was first formally described in 1854 by the botanist Carl Meissner who published the description in the journal Linnaea. The specific epithet (carinata) is a Latin word meaning "keeled", possibly referring to the leaves of this species, being triangular or boat-shaped in cross-section.

== Distribution and habitat ==
This hakea has a scattered distribution in southern parts of the Flinders Range and the Mount Lofty Ranges. A couple of isolated populations are also found in the southeast of the state around Padthaway. The species is often part of the understorey of dry sclerophyll forest and is also found among scrub-heath communities growing in sandy to loamy soils.
