= Onkaparinga River National Park =

National park in South Australia

- IUCN category II (national park)
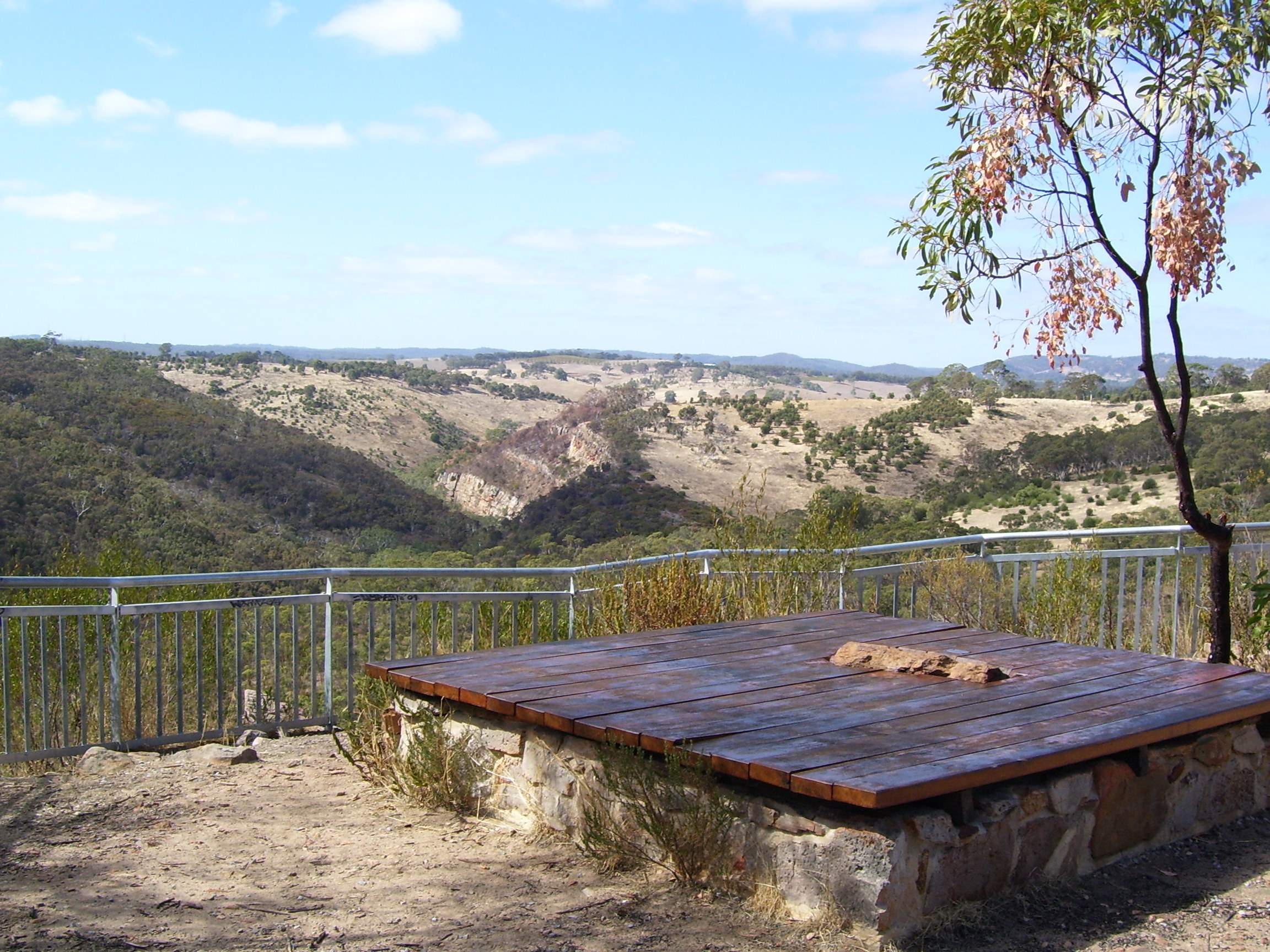
- Sundews lookout

- Location within South Australia
- Location: South Australia
- Nearest city: Adelaide city centre
- Coordinates: 35°09′38″S 138°33′14″E
- Area: 15.42 km^{2} (5.95 sq mi)
- Established: 5 August 1993
- Governing body: Department for Environment and Water
- Website: Official website

Onkaparinga River National Park is a protected area in the Australian state of South Australia located about 32 kilometres (20 mi) south of Adelaide city centre. It extends over the floodplain of the Onkaparinga River east of Main South Road.

== History ==
Most of the land now dedicated to the national park was purchased in the period 1973 to 1977 by a former SA government agency, the State Planning Authority. The purpose of the land acquisition which included land along the full length of Onkaparinga River was threefold. Firstly, it was ‘to provide open space for recreational purposes’, secondly, ‘to preserve the natural character of the landscape, including the native flora and fauna’ and thirdly, ‘to function as a buffer between areas of urban and rural land.’ In 1982, the majority of the land was transferred to the then Department for Environment and Heritage which established the Onkaparinga River Recreation Park in 1985. In 1993, all of the land east of Main South Road (known as the gorge section’) was removed from the recreation park and constituted as the Onkaparinga River National Park. For managerial and administrative purposes, the recreation park and the national park are known collectively as the ‘Onkaparinga River Reserve’.

== Prior use of land ==
The lower reaches of the Onkaparinga River were inhabited by the Kaurna Aboriginal people, and the name of the river is taken from the Kaurna name meaning chief. European settlement and farming in the district began about 1840 leading to the rapid displacement of the Aboriginal inhabitants. Kaurna people still have strong ties to the area through cultural practices and religious beliefs. The town of Noarlunga (renamed Old Noarlunga) was the service centre with farm produce being transported 10 kilometres (6.2 mi) down river to Port Noarlunga.

== Flora and fauna ==
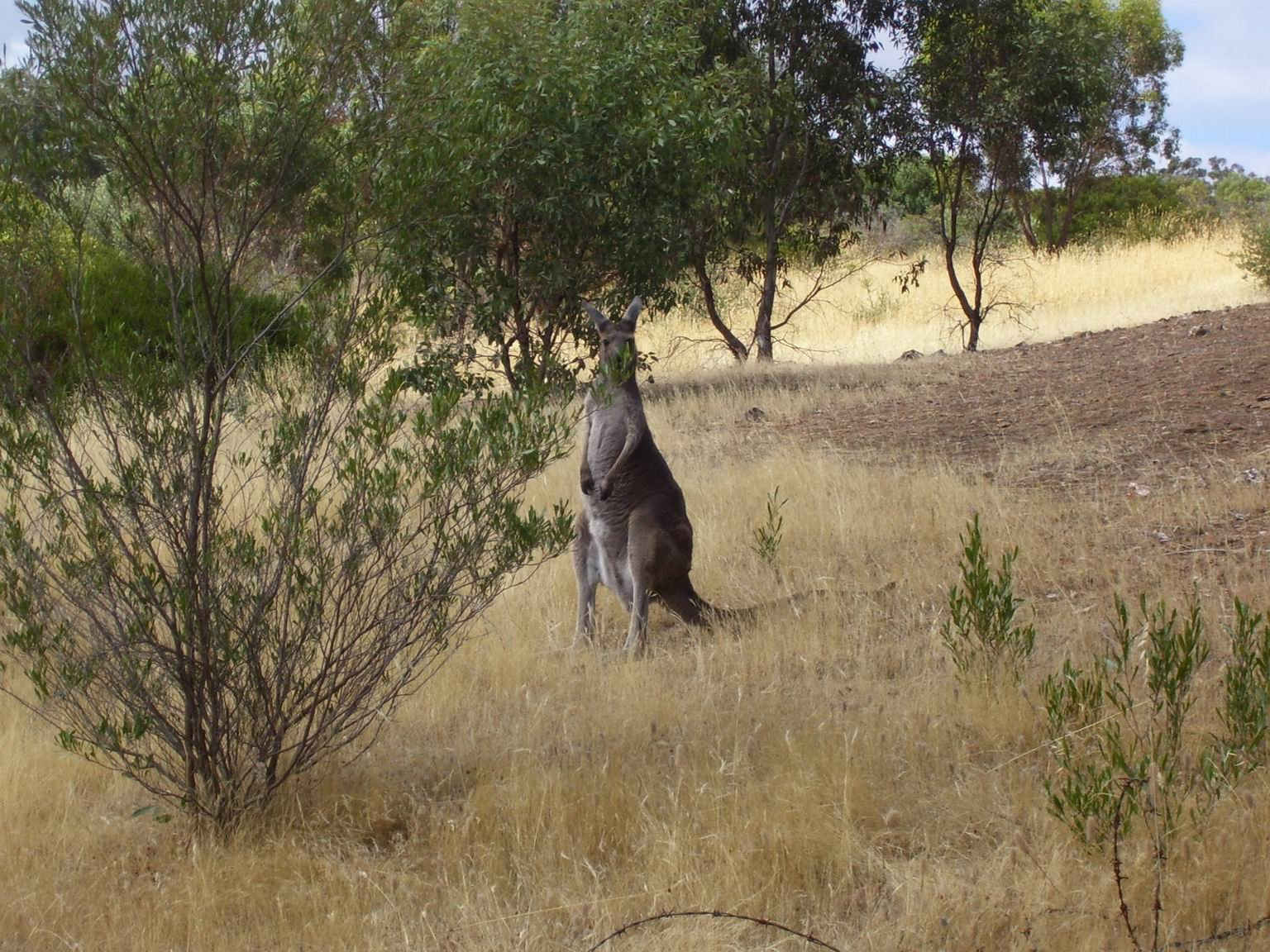
A kangaroo of Onkaparinga River National Park

The vegetation of the park has been greatly perturbed by human activity, but remnant patches remain. The most intact area is the Hardy's Scrub section of the reserve. 160 years of livestock grazing, timber harvesting and cropping has cleared most of the reserve of native understorey species and in many areas invasive grasses are the main vegetation type. Remnant eucalypts are the most noticeable native species in the reserve. Eucalyptus microcarpa (grey box), Eucalyptus fasciculosa (pink gum), Eucalyptus porosa (mallee box), Eucalyptus camaldulensis (red gum), and Eucalyptus leucoxylon (blue gum) all occur in the reserve. The European olive (Olea europaea) is a noxious weed in South Australia and has invaded the park, although generally individuals are not as large as in older parks in the Mount Lofty Ranges like Belair National Park but will continue to be a problem unless managed. Over the last twenty years accessible areas of the gorge have been revegetated by contractors working for National Parks SA. The oldest area of revegetation in the park was conducted with tubestock, predominantly of eucalypts. Recent efforts have focused on the direct seeding method where seed of native species is ploughed into a scraped trench. Insect activity includes butterflies (Lepidoptera) and dragonflies (Anisoptera). Kangaroos are common among the open hillsides with abundant grasses.

== Trails ==
=== Hardys Scrub Hike ===
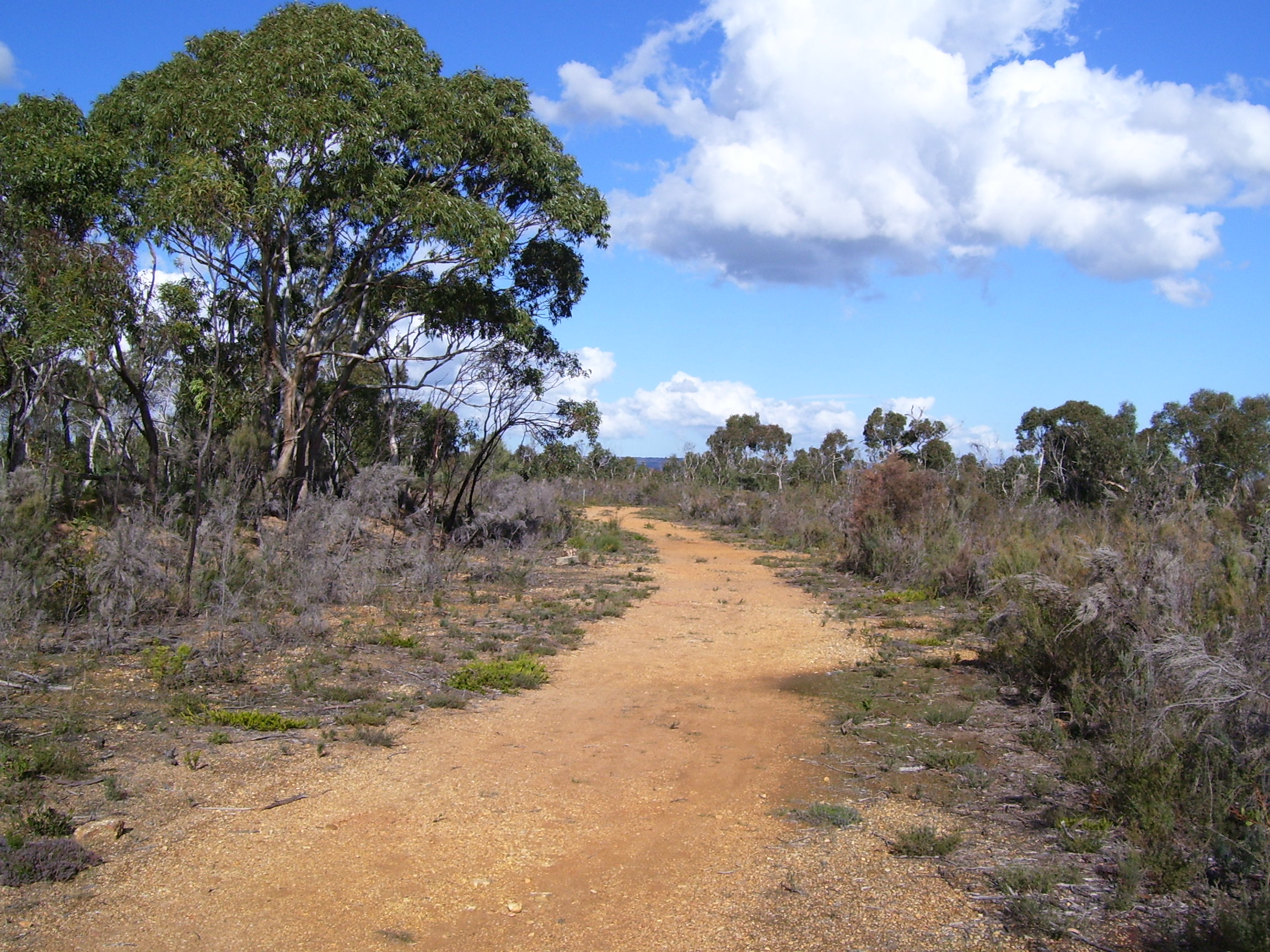
Old Quarry Track

2 hr loop, 4 kilometres (2.5 mi) loop (Gate 11).

This patch of native vegetation is a very important conservation area, despite a history of timber cutting, quarrying and grazing.

=== Nature Hike ===
2 hr loop, 3.5 kilometres (2.2 mi) loop (Gate 6).

The Nature Hike includes good views of the gorge, while trails provide an opportunity to view many species of birds and the occasional lizard.

=== Echidna Hike ===
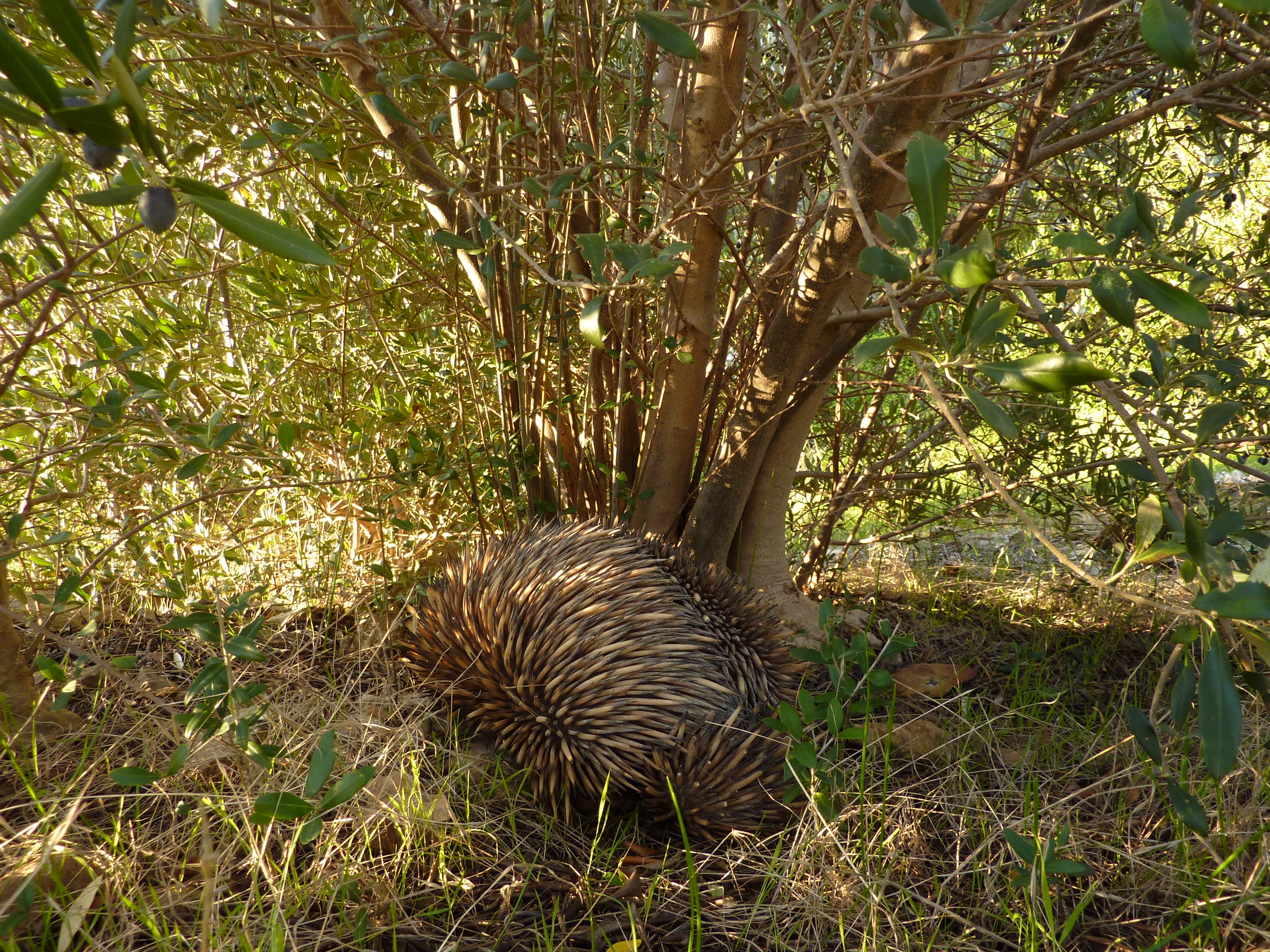
An echidna under an olive tree

2.5 hr loop, 3.5 kilometres (2.2 mi) loop (Gate 7).

The Echidna Trail winds its way amongst some of the best remnant vegetation and visits six heritage sites, including huts and houses built in the 1880s. The dominant overstorey species is peppermint box, with river red gum in the gullies and pink gum on the higher slopes. Other plant species include sheoak, golden wattle, a small stand of native pine and various herbaceous ground covers. Twenty-seven native orchid species have been recorded in the area.

=== Sundews Ridge Hike ===
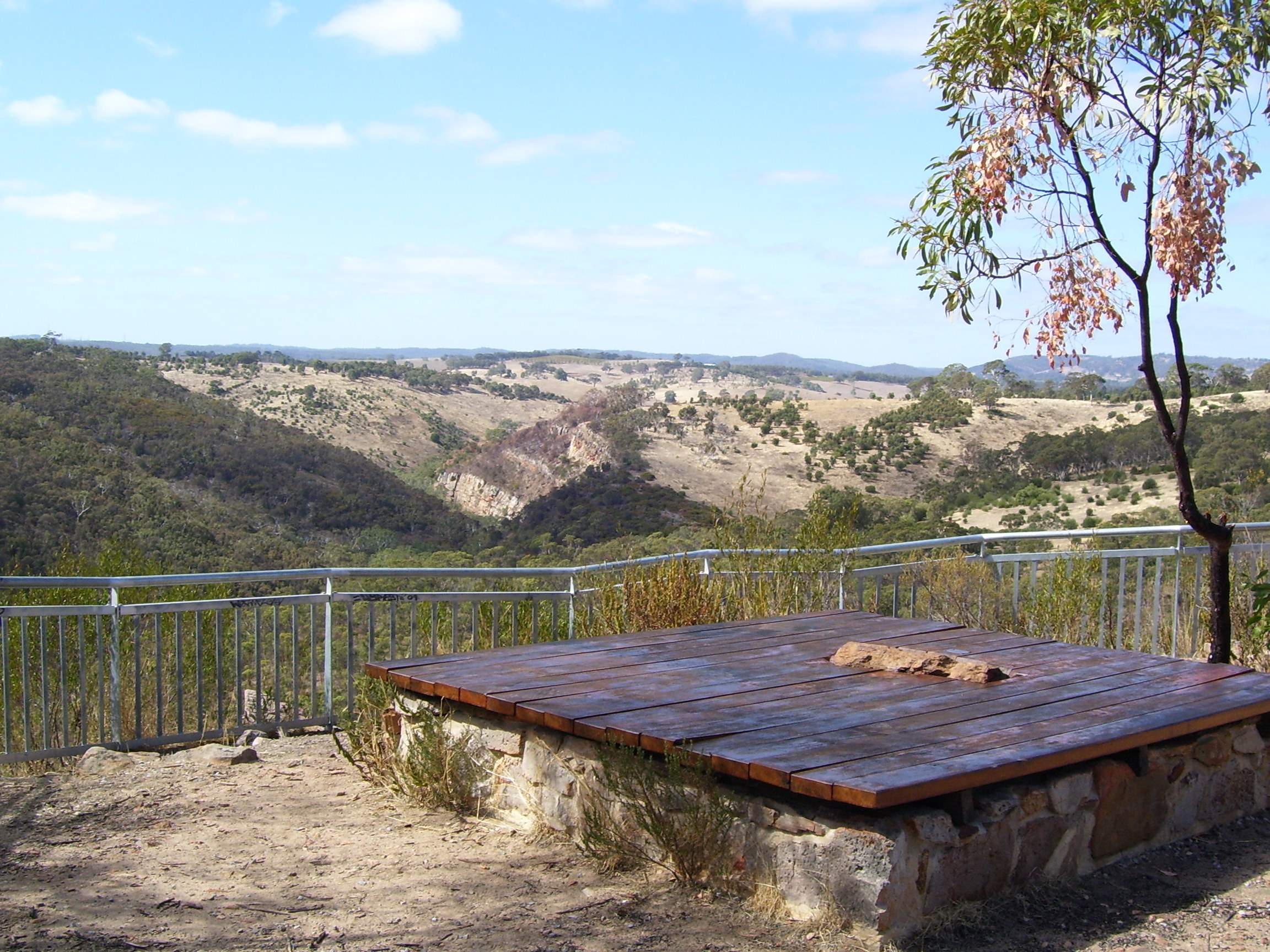
Sundews Lookout

2 hr loop, 4 kilometres (2.5 mi) loop (Gate 6).

A relatively short hike to view the rocky outcrops and meandering Onkaparinga River from the Sundews Lookout.

=== Gorge Track ===
4 hr return, 3.5 kilometres (2.2 mi) return (Gate 18).

This trail leads to viewpoints overlooking the gorge before descending to the river.

=== Sundews River Hike ===
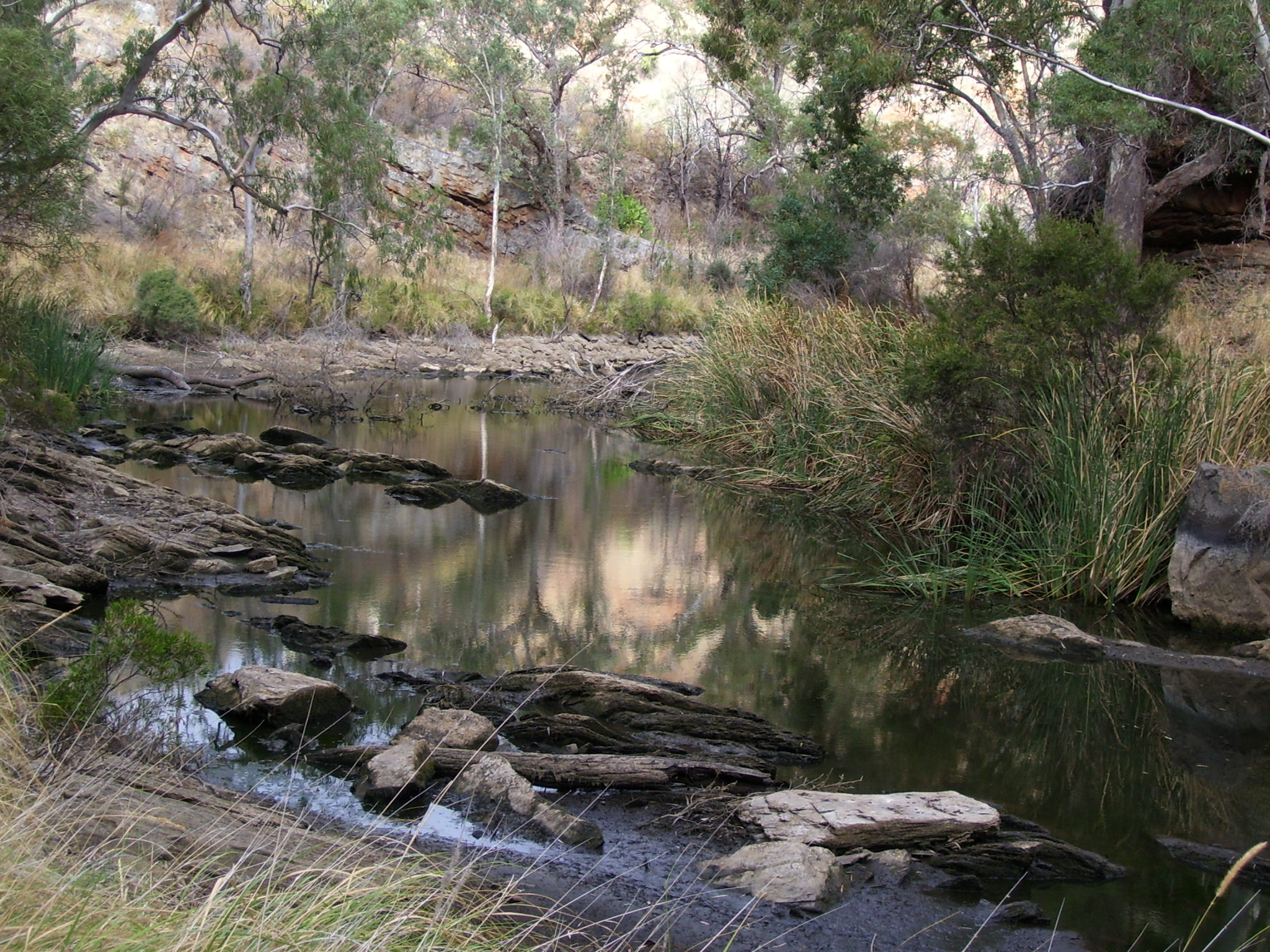
Onkaparinga River at the end of Sundews River Hike

4 hr loop, 4 kilometres (2.5 mi) loop (Gate 6).

This rocky trail descends steeply from the Sundews Lookout to the bottom of the gorge, and then follows the river downstream for a short distance before returning up the steep slopes of the gorge to the ridge and then the car park.

=== Rock climbing ===
Climbing is permitted on the designated cliff area near Gate 10. Specific skills and equipment are required. Climbers are required to contact the Belair District Office first.

== See also ==
- List of protected areas in Adelaide
- Protected areas of South Australia

== Further information ==
- Whitaker, Michael L (2013), Twelve more walks in the Onkaparinga River National and Recreation Parks, Friends of Onkaparinga Park, S.Aust.
