= Talisker Conservation Park =

Protected area in South Australia

- IUCN category VI (protected area with sustainable use of natural resources)
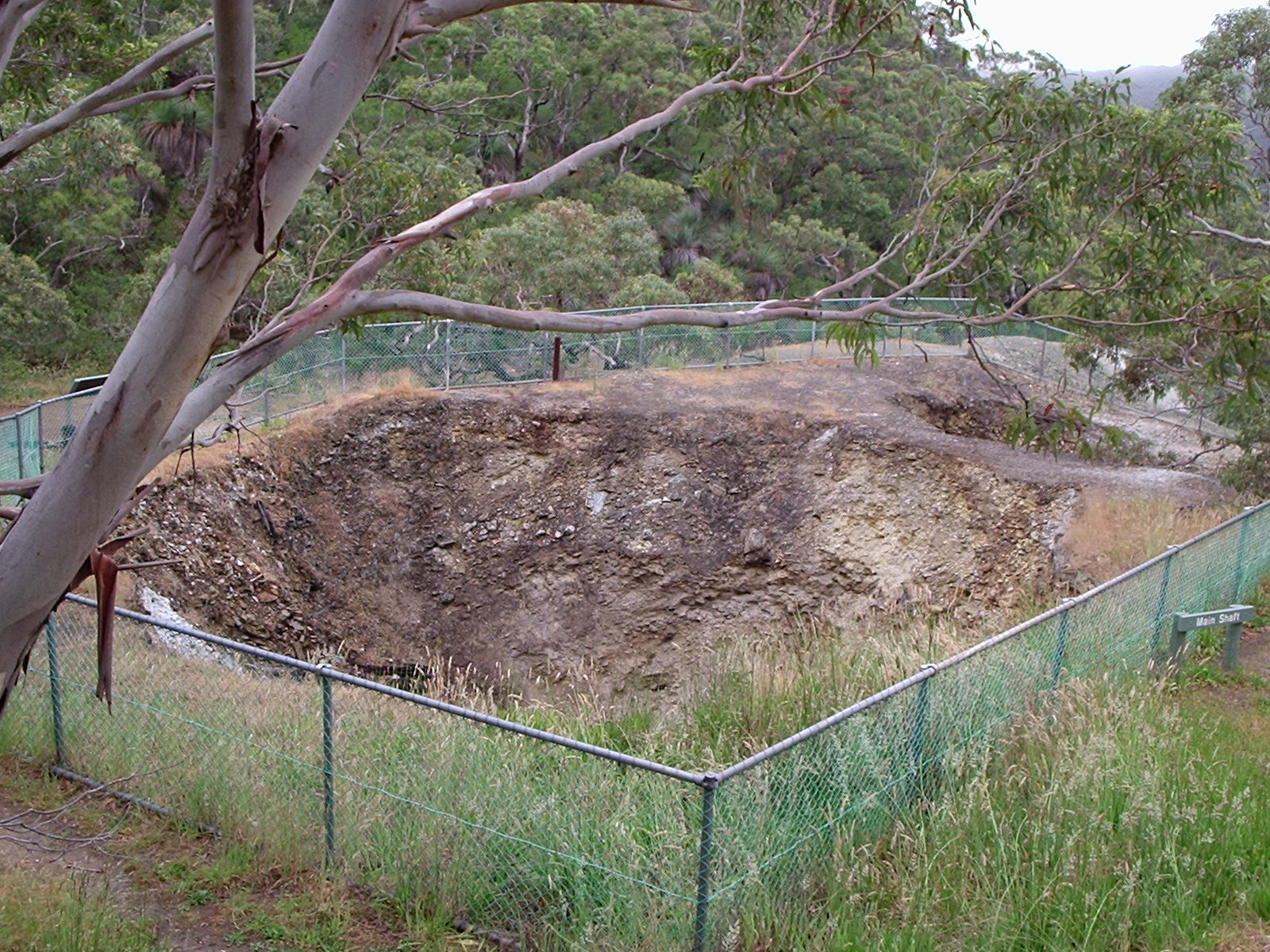
- Talisker mine open cut

- Location within South Australia
- Location: South Australia, Silverton
- Nearest city: Cape Jervis
- Coordinates: 35°37′20″S 138°09′08″E
- Area: 2.11 km^{2} (0.81 sq mi)
- Established: 28 November 1985
- Visitors: "25,000-30,000" (Note: Visitor numbers shared with Deep Creek Conservation Park) (in 1997)
- Governing body: Department for Environment and Water

Talisker Conservation Park is a protected area in the Australian state of South Australia located on the south-western area of the Fleurieu Peninsula near the town of Cape Jervis and adjacent to Deep Creek Conservation Park. The conservation park covers 211 ha (520 acres) including areas of thick scrub, some steep walking tracks and the heritage-listed remains of a nineteenth century silver and lead mine.

Talisker became a conservation park in 1976 after a period of 104 years of intermittent mining activity in the area. The conservation park owes its name to the two McLeod brothers who discovered an outcrop of silver-lead ore while searching for gold in 1862. The Talisker Mining company was formed the same year to extract the ore from the lode the McLeods named the "Talisker of Scotland" after a locality in their homeland, the Isle of Skye.

Land within the conservation park's boundaries is known to be a site for Pterostylis bryophila (Hindmarsh Valley greenhood), a species of plant which is listed as "critically endangered" by the Commonwealth Environment Protection and Biodiversity Conservation Act 1999 and as "endangered" by the South Australian National Parks and Wildlife Act 1972.

The conservation park is classified as an IUCN Category VI protected area.
