= Clarendon, South Australia =

Clarendon
- Suburb
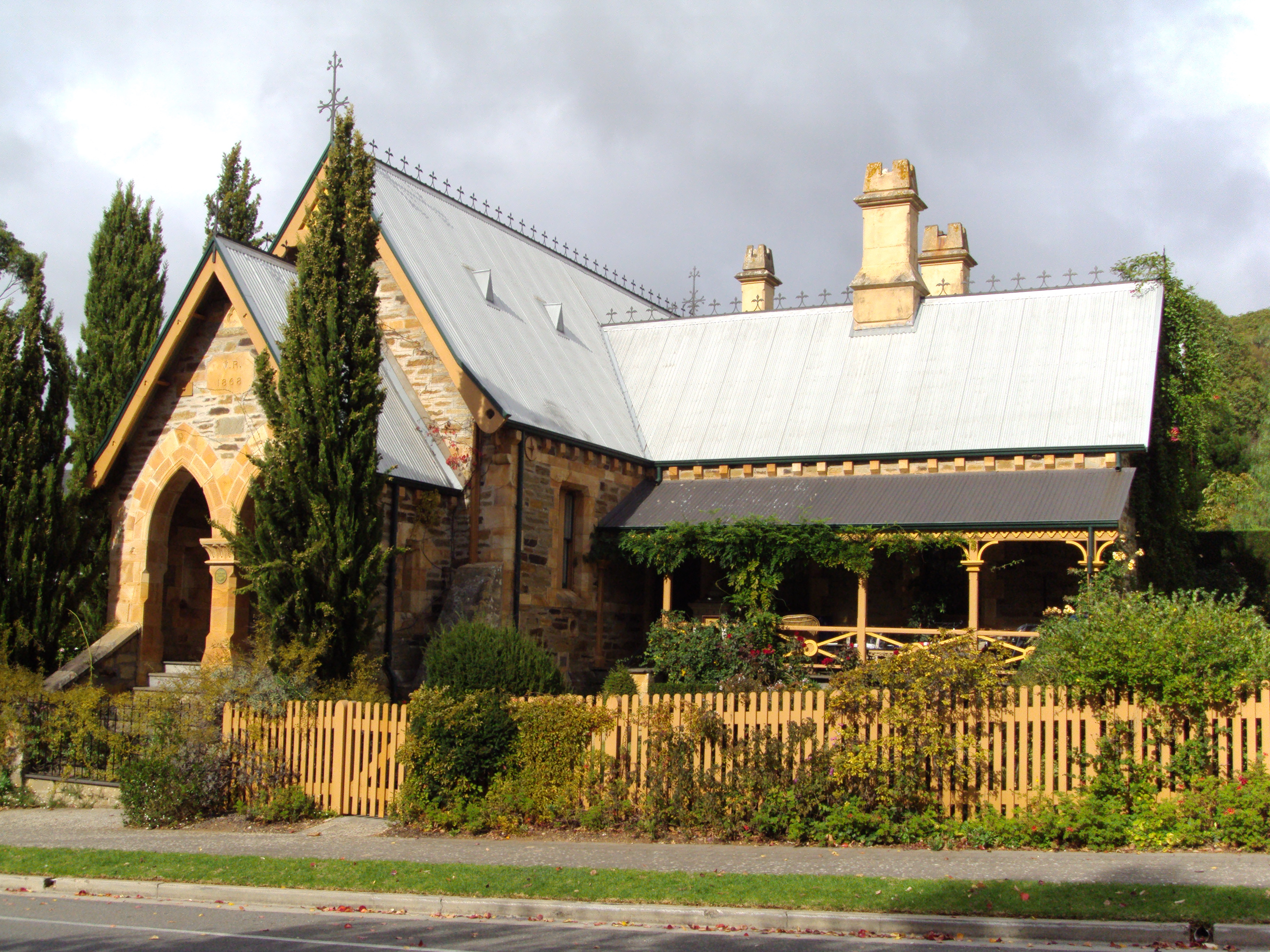
- Clarendon Police Station and Court House (built 1868)

- Coordinates: 35°07′0″S 138°38′0″E
- Country: Australia
- State: South Australia
- Region: Southern Adelaide
- LGA: City of Onkaparinga
- Location: 35.5 km (22.1 mi) from Adelaide
- Established: 1840

Government
  - State electorate: Heysen
  - Federal division: Mayo
- Elevation: 188 m (617 ft)

Population
  - Total: 643 (SAL 2021)
- Postcode: 5157
- County: Adelaide
Suburbs around Clarendon
Happy Valley	Chandlers Hill	Cherry Gardens
Woodcroft	Clarendon	Dorset Vale
Onkaparinga Hills	Blewitt Springs	Kangarilla

Clarendon /ˈklærəndən/ is a small town in the Adelaide Hills, about 25–30 kilometres (16–19 mi) south of the Adelaide city centre and now regarded as an outer suburb of Adelaide. It lies within the City of Onkaparinga council area. The Clarendon Weir is located in the town area, on the Onkaparinga River.

== History ==
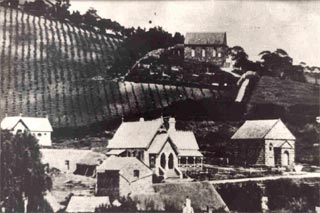
Vineyards and Police Station, date unknown

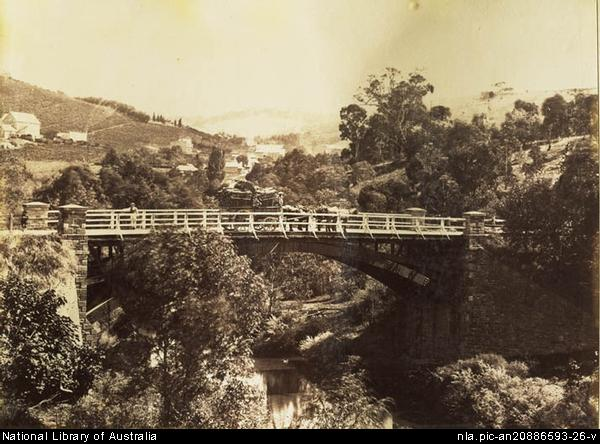
Clarendon bridge around 1869

The Kaurna people were the original inhabitants of the area.

On 21 October 1840, Richard Blundell was granted the title to Section 801 of the Hundred of Noarlunga, after the area had been surveyed. In 1846 James Philcox purchased part of the section and subdivided it, selling the allotments and creating the town. In 1848, what remained of Section 801 was sold to Philcox's friend George Morphett, who later surveyed more allotments, and others added blocks adjacent to the town.

In December 1846 the Clarendon vineyards were developed on land purchased by English benefactor William Augustine Leigh (1802–1873), one of many parcels of land bought through his agent Sir John Morphett (including two town acres between Currie and Hindley streets in the city blocks, hence the naming of Leigh Street). A vineyard was created by 1849, probably by John or George Morphett. Edward Peake bought the winery from Leigh, built the first cottage on the site, and sold it to Joseph Gillard, who owned it for 40 years, selling most of the wine to Penfolds. The winery complex was converted into a conference centre in the 1970s.

By 1866 the town was described as a regional centre "in the midst of a fine agricultural district, where wheat, peas, and potatoes are largely grown". The Clarendon area, Coromandel Valley and Kangarilla focused on orchards, market gardens and timber production in the early years, but after revised farming practices were introduced after the 1860s, vineyards were planted at Clarendon and other areas, and many wineries began producing and exporting wine. Early trade was built around local vineyards and around proximity to the Onkaparinga River, and from 1894 to 1896 the Clarendon Weir was constructed, enhancing the local economy.

== Heritage buildings ==
Many buildings in Clarendon were put on the Register of the National Estate and restored over time, including the Gothic Court House and Police Station, the Bible Christian Methodist Church, the 1875 Methodist Church (now Uniting), the Oddfellows Hall and General Store.

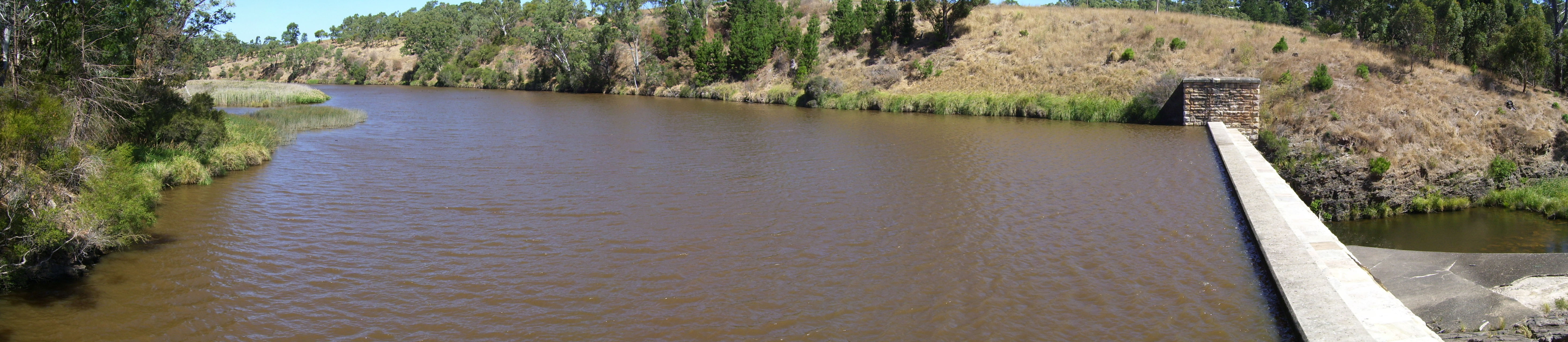
Clarendon Weir panorama
