= Onkaparinga River Recreation Park =

Protected area in South Australia

- IUCN category III (natural monument or feature)
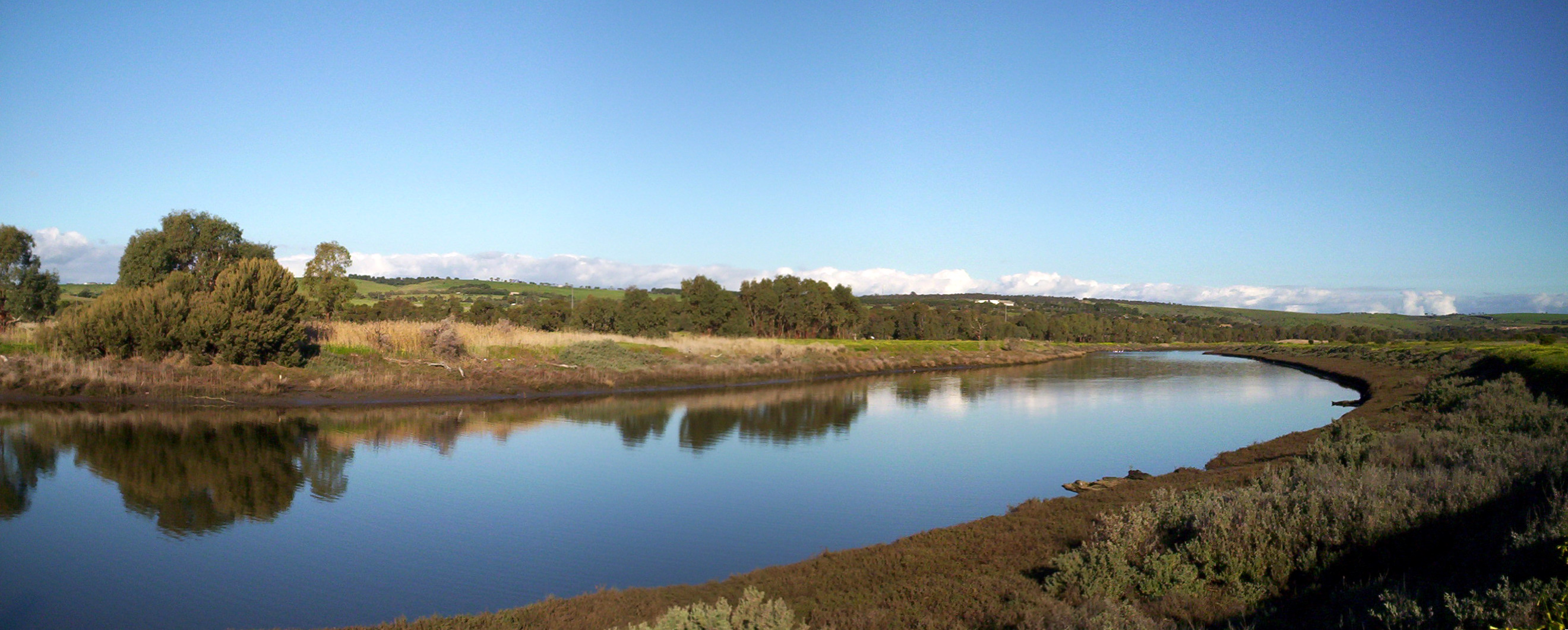
- Onkaparinga Estuary

- Location within South Australia
- Location: South Australia
- Nearest city: Port Noarlunga South
- Coordinates: 35°9′51.8″S 138°29′26.6″E
- Area: 2.67 km^{2} (1.03 sq mi)
- Established: 7 November 1985
- Governing body: Department for Environment and Water
- Website: Official website

Onkaparinga River Recreation Park is a protected area occupying land in the estuary of the Onkaparinga River in South Australia. The recreation park which was established in 1985 is approximately 32 km (20 mi) from Adelaide city centre. It is the venue for recreational activities such as walking, canoeing, kayaking, recreational fishing and picnics.

== Description ==
The recreation park occupies the majority of the portion of the river's catchment area between Main South Road near Old Noarlunga in the east and Commercial and Saltfleet Roads at Port Noarlunga in the west. The occupied land is located within the following suburbs in the City of Onkaparinga: Noarlunga Downs, Port Noarlunga South and Seaford Meadows. A combined pedestrian/cycle track known as the Coast to Vines Rail Trail has an easement that passes through the recreation park on its east side following the alignment of the former Willunga railway line. The Seaford railway line passes over the recreation park on a 1.2 km (0.75 mi) elevated bridge (known as the Onkaparinga Valley Bridge) which was built between 2011 and 2014. It is classified as an IUCN Category III protected area.

== History ==
Most of the land now dedicated to the recreation park was purchased in the period 1973 to 1977 by a former SA government agency, the State Planning Authority. The purpose of the land acquisition which included land along the full length of Onkaparinga River was threefold. Firstly, it was ‘to provide open space for recreational purposes’, secondly, ‘to preserve the natural character of the landscape, including the native flora and fauna’ and thirdly, ‘to function as a buffer between areas of urban and rural land.’ In 1982, the majority of the land was transferred to the then Department for Environment and Heritage which established the recreation park in 1985. In 1993, all of the land east of Main South Road (known as the gorge section’) was reclassified as the Onkaparinga River National Park. For managerial and administrative purposes, the recreation park and the national park are known collectively as the ‘Onkaparinga River Reserve’.

== Prior use of the land ==
=== Aboriginal use ===
As of 2004, radiocarbon dating of material recovered via archaeological excavation from known Aboriginal sites in the river's estuary suggest continuous use of the land prior to European colonisation for as long ago as 7,500 years BP.

=== European use ===
Land in the locality including the Onkaparinga floodplain was surveyed and became available for selection in February 1839. Most of the land in the recreation park was a farm originally purchased about 1861 by John Jared, an immigrant who arrived from Lincolnshire, England. The original purchase of 240 acres (97 ha) was expanded to 400 acres (160 ha). Jared named the farm ‘Clear Farm’ and built a house on the property in 1862. Jared was succeeded in 1871 by his son, John William, who renamed the property ‘Pringle Farm’. The property remained in the Jared family until the 1970s when it was purchased by the State Planning Authority. The remains of Pringle Farm which was listed on the South Australian Heritage Register on 11 April 1996 are conserved within the recreation park.

== Recreational uses ==
The recreation park features a system of walking tracks. Two are named and signposted: the Wetlands Walk on the north side of the river and the Pringle Farm Walk on the south side of the river. Canoeing, kayaking and recreational fishing is permitted in the waters of the Onkaparinga River within the recreation park's boundaries. Dogs are permitted in the recreation park, but must be kept on a leash at all times. Vehicle parking areas, toilets and a picnic ground are provided both within the recreation park and just outside its boundaries. A recreational airfield of 900 m (3,000 ft) length which is known as the Old Noarlunga Airfield is located in the south east corner of the recreation park. It is leased by two organisations, the South Coast Flying Club Inc and the Noarlunga Model Aero Sports Inc, for flying respectively vintage aircraft and model aircraft.

== Associated protected areas ==
The full extent of the River Onkaparinga from the recreational park's eastern boundary at Old Noarlunga to its western boundary at Port Noarlunga is part of both the Port Noarlunga Reef Aquatic Reserve and the Encounter Marine Park. With respect to the aquatic reserve, the only permitted fishing activity is ‘line fishing and hand net fishing for bait shrimp only’.

== See also ==
- List of protected areas in Adelaide
