= Onkaparinga River =

River in South Australia

Onkaparinga
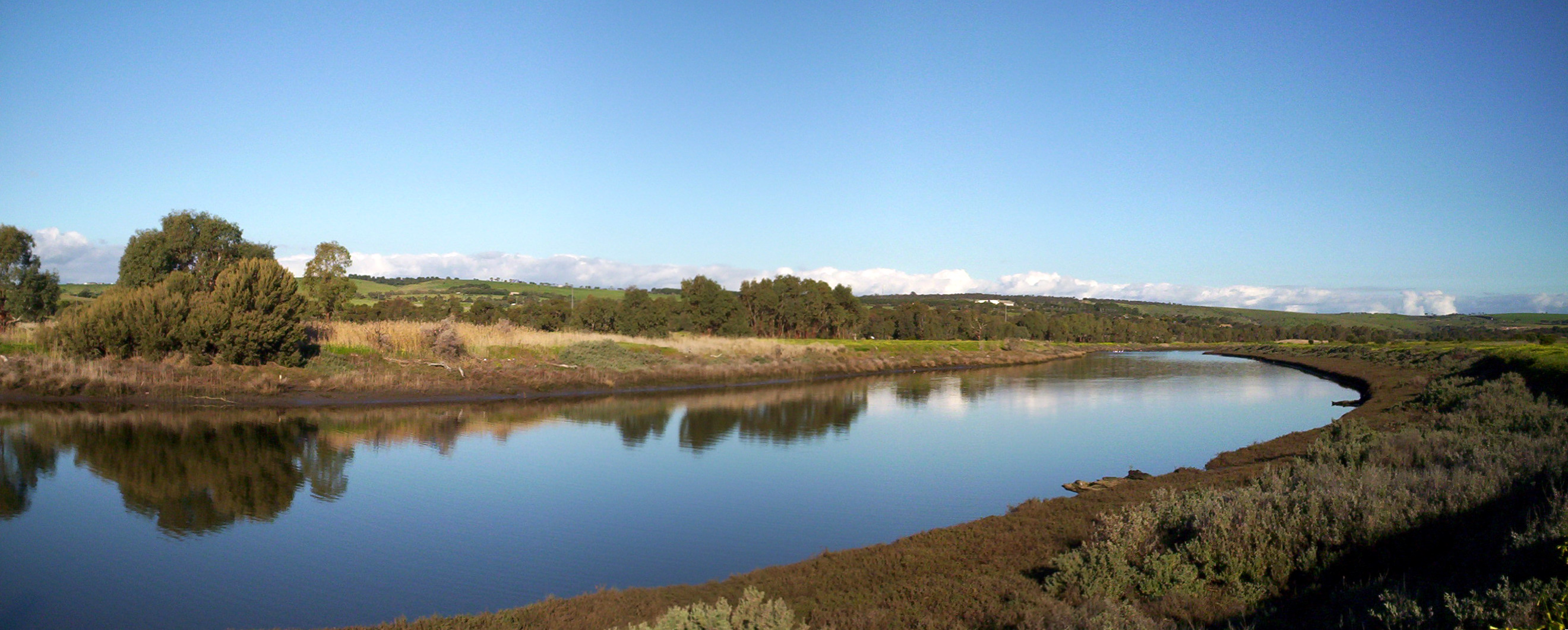
- Onkaparinga River estuary

- Location of the river mouth in South Australia
- Native name: Ngangkiparri (Kaurna)

Location
- Country: Australia
- State: South Australia
- Region: Southern Adelaide
- Local government area: City of Onkaparinga
- Towns: Woodside, Oakbank, Clarendon

Physical characteristics
- Source: Mount Lofty Range
  - location: between Charleston and Mount Torrens
  - elevation: 422 m (1,385 ft)
- Mouth: Gulf St Vincent
  - location: between Port Noarlunga South and Port Noarlunga
  - coordinates: 35°09′53″S 138°28′10″E
  - elevation: 0 m (0 ft)
- Length: 88 km (55 mi)
- Basin size: 562 km^{2} (217 sq mi)

Basin features
- Protected areas: Encounter Marine Park; Onkaparinga River National Park; Onkaparinga River Recreation Park; Port Noarlunga Reef Aquatic Reserve

The Onkaparinga River, known as Ngangkiparri or Ngangkiparingga ("place of the women’s river") in the Kaurna language, is a river in the Southern Adelaide region in the Australian state of South Australia. Rising in the Mount Lofty Ranges, the river's estuary extends from Old Noarlunga to the river's mouth between the suburbs of Port Noarlunga and Port Noarlunga South.

== Etymology and history ==
The name derives from the language of the Kaurna people, a word written as either Ngangkiparri or Ngangkiparingga (the -ngga suffix means "at"). Translated, it means "place of the women’s river".

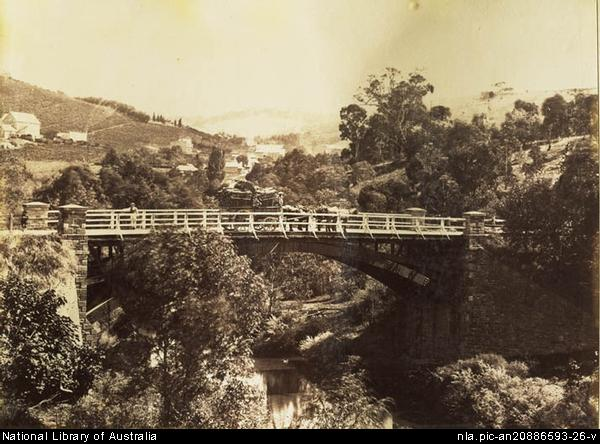
Bridge over the Onkaparinga at Clarendon circa 1869

On 13 April 1831, British military officer Captain Collet Barker and his party arrived at Cape Jervis on the Isabella. He examined the east coast of Gulf St Vincent and found the Onkaparinga River on 15 April. After anchoring and heading inland Barker then explored the ranges inland, north of the present site of Adelaide, and climbed Mount Lofty where he also sighted the Port River inlet, Barker Inlet and the future Port Adelaide.

In 1837 Surveyor-General of South Australia Colonel William Light named it Field's River, or the Field River, after Lieutenant William George Field RN (1804–1850) of the brig Rapid (one of the "first fleet"), who carried out the first surveys in the vicinity of its estuary, but subsequent Governor George Gawler soon reinstated the Indigenous name.

The first European settlers to explore its sources and the Onkaparinga Valley were the party of George Imlay and John Hill in January 1838.

== Course and features ==
The Onkaparinga River rises on the slopes of the Mount Lofty Range between Mount Torrens and Charleston and flows generally southwesterly, south of the Adelaide city centre, to reach its mouth at Port Noarlunga. The catchment area is over 500 square kilometres (190 square miles) in area, and in part includes the protected areas of the Encounter Marine Park, the Onkaparinga River National Park, the Onkaparinga River Recreation Park and the Port Noarlunga Reef Aquatic Reserve. The river descends 422 metres (1,385 ft) over its 88-kilometre (55 mi) course.

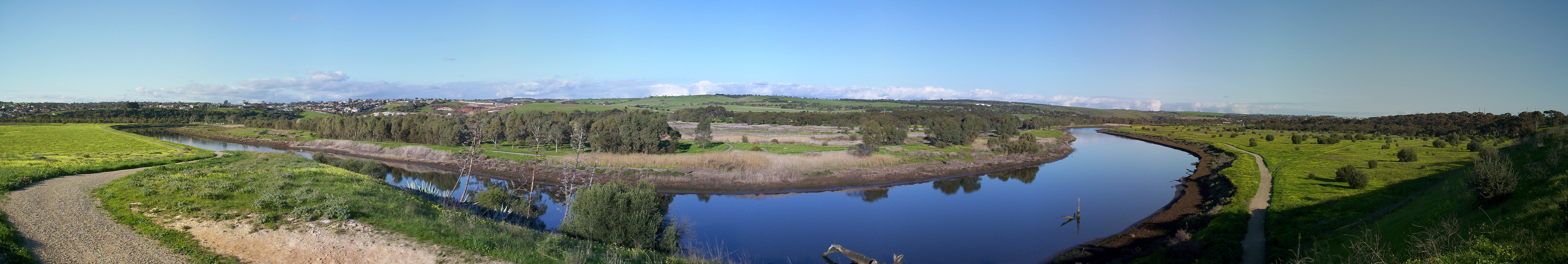
Onkaparinga Estuary on winter afternoon at Noarlunga Downs, facing east

The Onkaparinga River is the second major river within the Adelaide metropolitan area, after the River Torrens. It is a source of fresh water for Adelaide. Mount Bold Reservoir was constructed between 1932 and 1938 along a section of its path approximately 20 kilometres (12 miles) inland. Much of its flow is diverted via a tunnel from the Clarendon Weir to the Happy Valley Reservoir, that in turn supplies some 40 per cent of Adelaide's water supply. Most years the flow to the reservoir is supplemented by water pumped from the River Murray via a pipeline from Murray Bridge.

Downstream from Mount Bold Reservoir is the Clarendon Weir. To maintain levels at Clarendon Weir, water is released only as required. The Onkaparinga Gorge extends from Clarendon to Old Noarlunga. An estuary extends from Old Noarlunga to the river's mouth between the suburbs of Port Noarlunga and Port Noarlunga South. The estuary is a significant breeding area for local marine fish species.

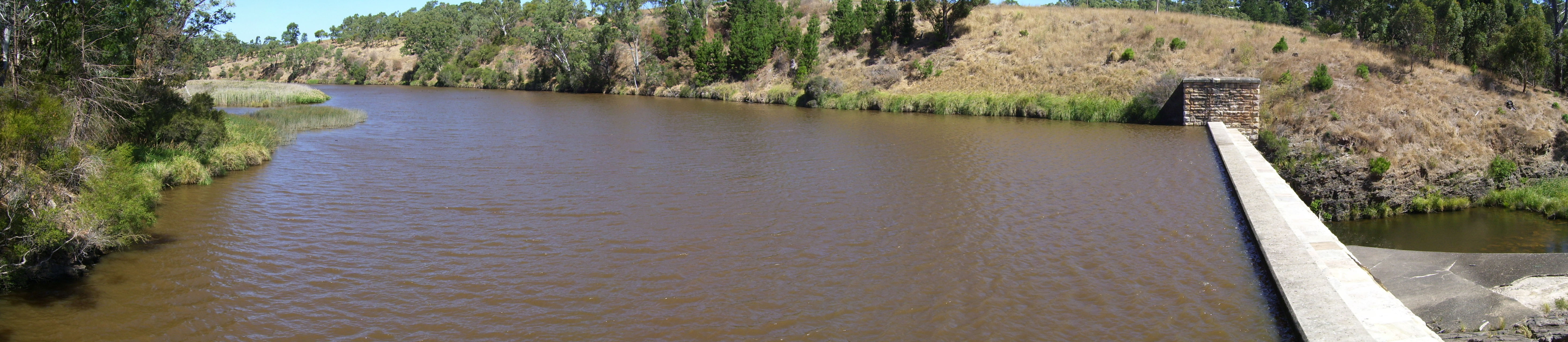
Onkaparinga at Clarendon Weir

The Coast to Vines rail trail crosses over the river just west of where Main South Road crosses over. The Seaford railway line passes over the river on a 1.2-kilometre (0.75 mi) elevated bridge (known as the Onkaparinga Valley Bridge) which was built between 2011 and 2014.

== See also ==
- List of rivers of Australia § South Australia
