= Clarendon Weir =

Weir in Adelaide, South Australia

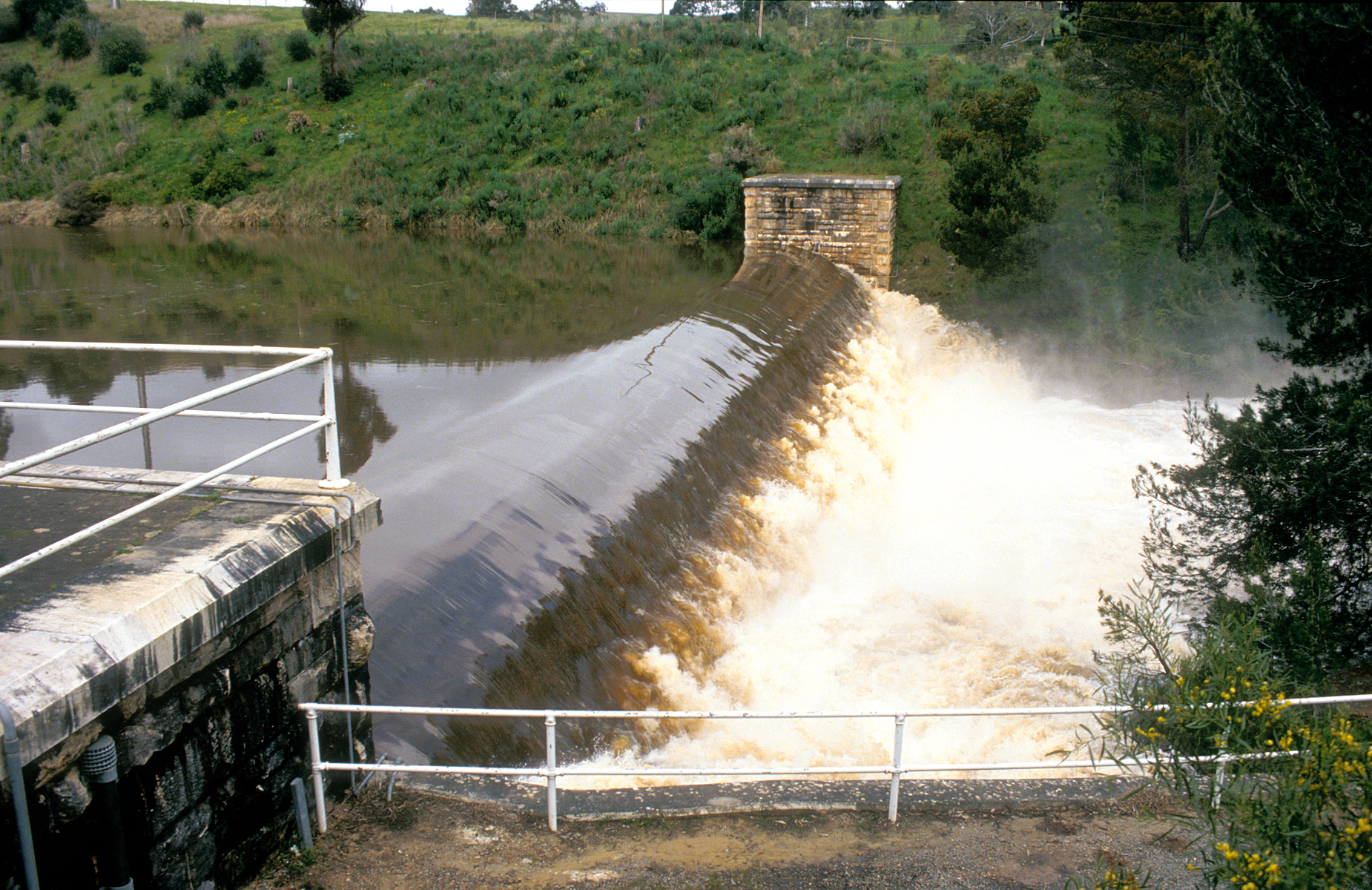
- Flood waters surge over the weir, 1992

- Location of the weir in the Adelaide metropolitan area
- Interactive map of Clarendon Weir
- Country: Australia
- Location: Clarendon, Adelaide, South Australia
- Coordinates: 35°06′42″S 138°38′05″E
- Purpose: Water supply
- Status: Operational
- Construction began: 1894
- Opening date: 1896
- Built by: J Wishart & Son
- Owner: Government of South Australia
- Operator: SA Water

Dam and spillways
- Type of dam: Gravity dam
- Impounds: Onkaparinga River
- Height: 15 m (49 ft)
- Length: 83 m (272 ft)
- Width (crest): 61 m (200 ft)
- Dam volume: 47×10^{3} m^{3} (1.7×10^{6} cu ft)
- Spillway type: Uncontrolled
- Spillway capacity: 1,030 m^{3}/s (36,000 cu ft/s)

Reservoir
- Total capacity: 320 ML (260 acre⋅ft)
- Catchment area: 445 km^{2} (172 sq mi)
- Surface area: 8.5 ha (21 acres)
- Normal elevation: 171 m (561 ft) AHD

South Australian Heritage Register
- Official name: Clarendon Weir, Onkaparinga River
- Type: Utilities - Weir
- Designated: 8 November 1984
- Reference no.: 12711

The Clarendon Weir is a concrete gravity weir across the Onkaparinga River, located in the suburb of Clarendon, approximately 20 kilometres (12 mi) south of the Adelaide city centre, in South Australia.

== Overview ==
Built in 1894–96 as a solution to Adelaide's sewer problems, the weir supplied water to the Adelaide plains to flush the sewers as there simply was not enough water to keep the population healthy. A tunnel was built with ponies and carts through the hills to Happy Valley where a reservoir was built. The water flowed by gravity from the Weir through the tunnel to Happy Valley Reservoir. There is no other catchment for this reservoir. Mt Bold Reservoir was added in the 1940s to again supplement Adelaide's water supply with the Clarendon Weir acting as a holding dam down stream. The water is used to supply about half of the Adelaide region's water needs.

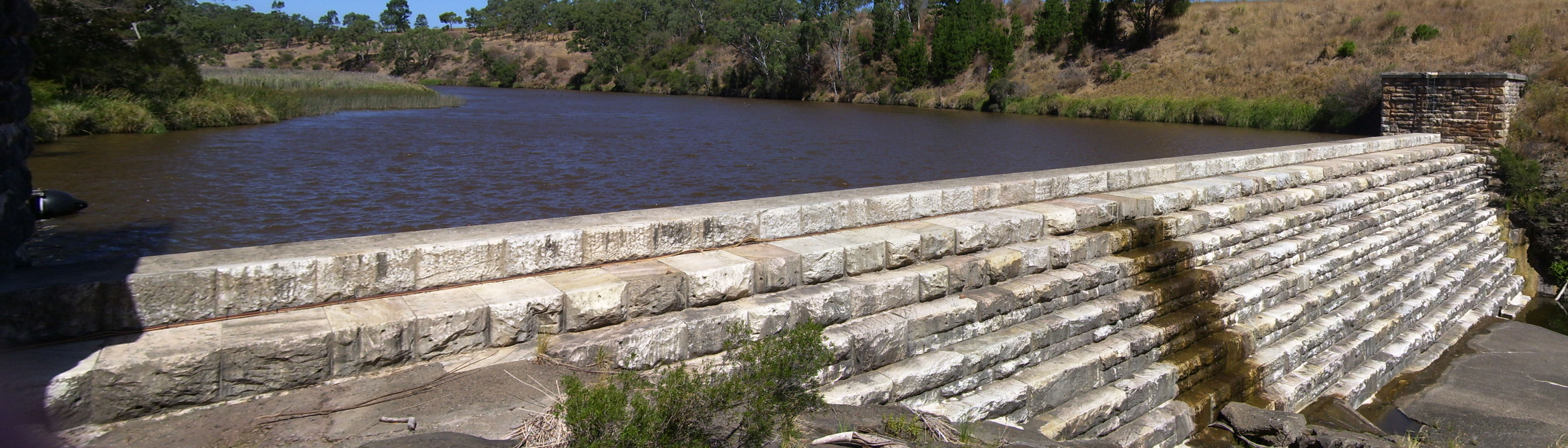
The marble wall of the weir, in 2010

The weir wall is 15 metres (49 ft) high and 83 metres (272 ft) long. When full, the reservoir has capacity of 320 megalitres (260 acre⋅ft) and covers 8.5 hectares (21 acres), drawn from a catchment area of 445 square kilometres (172 sq mi). The uncontrolled spillway has a flow capacity of 1,030 cubic metres per second (36,000 cu ft/s).

In the mid-1960s, the wall of the Clarendon Weir, originally constructed with large blocks of Macclesfield marble, was raised from 14 metres (46 ft) to its current height of 14.6 metres (48 ft).

The weir was listed on the former Register of the National Estate, and was added to the South Australian Heritage Register on 8 November 1984.

== See also ==
- List of reservoirs and dams in South Australia
