= Pterostylis bryophila =

Hindmarsh Valley greenhood

Conservation status
- Critically endangered (EPBC Act)

Scientific classification
- Kingdom: Plantae
- Clade: Tracheophytes
- Clade: Angiosperms
- Clade: Monocots
- Order: Asparagales
- Family: Orchidaceae
- Subfamily: Orchidoideae
- Tribe: Cranichideae
- Genus: Pterostylis
- Species: P. bryophila

Binomial name
- Pterostylis bryophila D.L.Jones

Synonyms
- Diplodium bryophilum (D.L.Jones) D.L.Jones & M.A.Clem.

Species of orchid

Pterostylis bryophila, commonly known as the Hindmarsh Valley greenhood, is a species of orchid endemic to South Australia. As with similar greenhoods, plants in flower differ from those that are not. In this species, plants not in flower have a rosette of leaves lying flat on the ground, but those in flower have a single small, shiny, bright green and white flower with a protruding, platform-like sinus between the lateral sepals.

== Description ==
Pterostylis bryophila is a terrestrial, perennial, deciduous, herb with an underground tuber and when not in flower, a rosette of between three and five leaves, each leaf 10–22 mm (0.4–0.9 in) long and 5–15 mm (0.2–0.6 in) wide. When in flower, plants have a single flower 18–20 mm (0.7–0.8 in) long and 8–10 mm (0.3–0.4 in) wide on a stem 120–180 mm (5–7 in) tall with four or five stem leaves. The flowers are shiny, bright green and white and curve forwards. The dorsal sepal and petals are fused, forming a hood or "galea" over the column, the dorsal sepal pointed and longer than the petals. The lateral sepals are held closely against the galea, have erect thread-like tips 16–21 mm (0.6–0.8 in) long and a flat, protruding, U-shaped sinus between their bases. The labellum is 9–11 mm (0.35–0.43 in) long, about 3 mm (0.1 in) wide, curved, dark brown and just visible above the sinus. Flowering occurs from April to July.

== Taxonomy and naming ==
Pterostylis bryophila was first formally described in 1997 by David Jones from a specimen collected near the Hindmarsh Valley Reservoir. The description was published in The Orchadian.

== Distribution and habitat ==
The Hindmarsh Valley greenhood grows in moist, shady places in grassy woodland and forest. It is only known from two locations 40 km (20 mi) apart on the Fleurieu Peninsula.

== Conservation ==
Pterostylis bryophila is listed as "critically endangered" (CR) under the Environment Protection and Biodiversity Conservation Act 1999 (EPBC Act). The main threats to the species are habitat disturbance, grazing by kangaroos and rabbits (Oryctolagus cuniculus), inappropriate fire regimes and weed invasion.
