= Hindmarsh River =

Hindmarsh
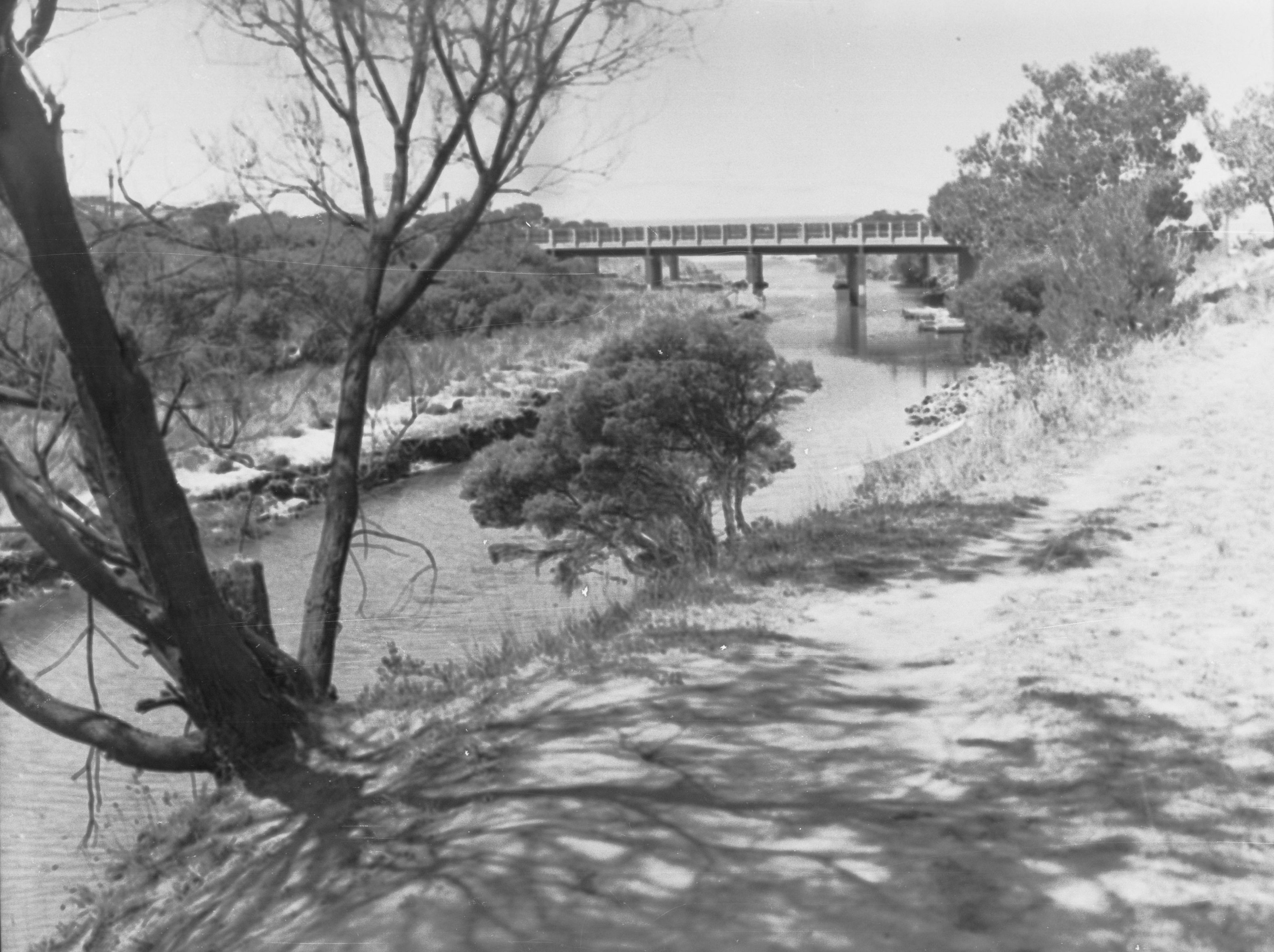
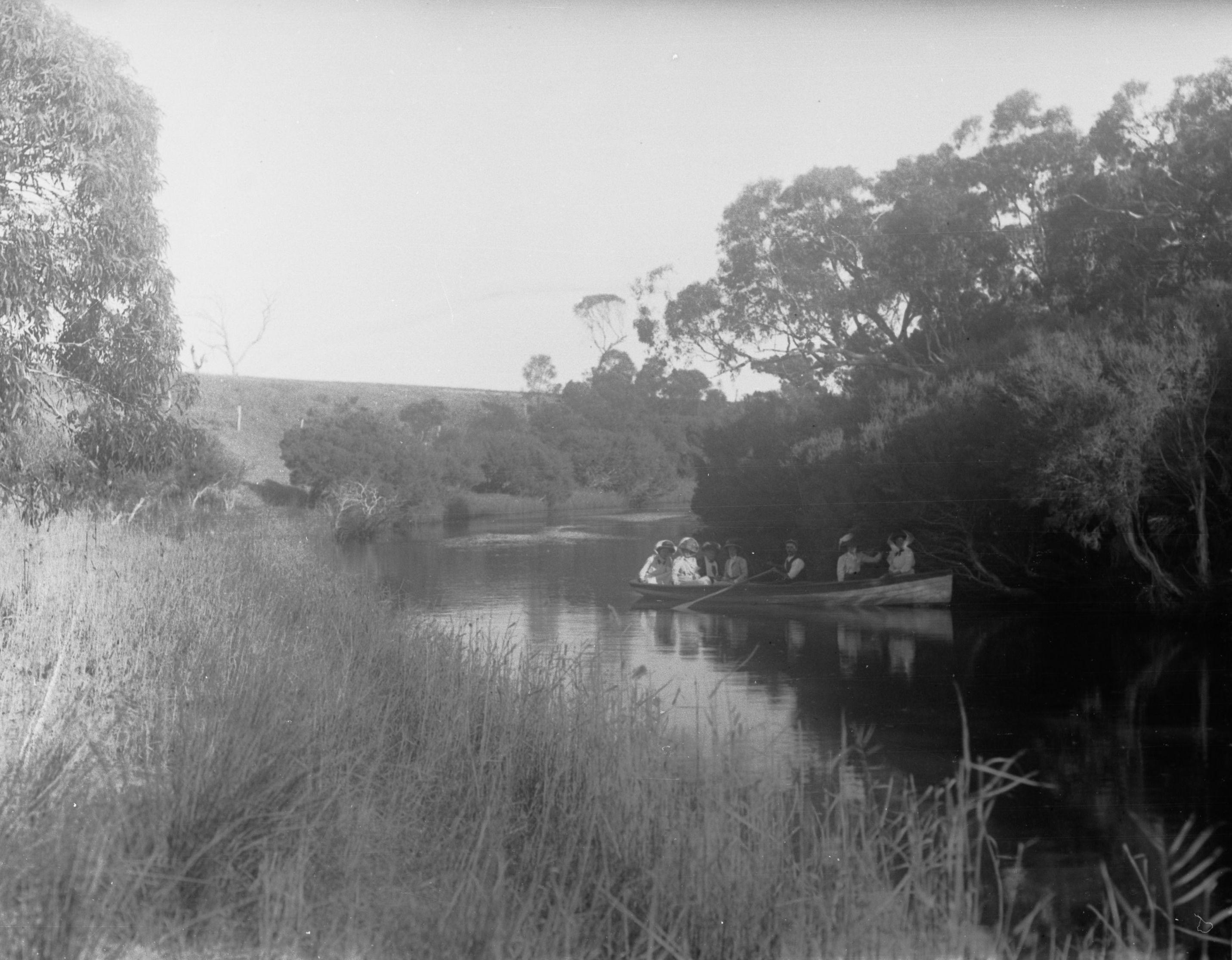
- Hindmarsh River bridge at Victor Harbor Rowboat on Hindmarsh River, ca. 1915

- Location of the river mouth in South Australia
- Etymology: Rear Admiral Sir John Hindmarsh KH, RN
- Native name: Yerltoworti (Kaurna)

Location
- Country: Australia
- State: South Australia
- Region: Fleurieu Peninsula

Physical characteristics
- Source: Mount Lofty Range
  - location: below Mount Cone
  - elevation: 257 m (843 ft)
- Mouth: Encounter Bay
  - location: Victor Harbor
  - coordinates: 35°32′38″S 138°37′53″E
  - elevation: 0 m (0 ft)
- Length: 23 km (14 mi)

Basin features
- Waterfall: Hindmarsh Falls

The Hindmarsh River is a river in the Fleurieu Peninsula region in the Australian state of South Australia.

== Course and features ==
The Hindmarsh River rises in the Mount Lofty Range below Mount Cone flows generally south by east through the Hindmarsh Valley before reaching its mouth and emptying into Encounter Bay at Victor Harbor. The river descends 257 metres (843 ft) over its 23-kilometre (14 mi) course.

== Etymology ==
The river is named in honour of Rear Admiral Sir John Hindmarsh KH, RN, the first Governor of South Australia.

== See also ==
- Rivers of South Australia
- Hindmarsh Valley Reservoir
