= Hindmarsh Valley Dam =

Dam in South Australia

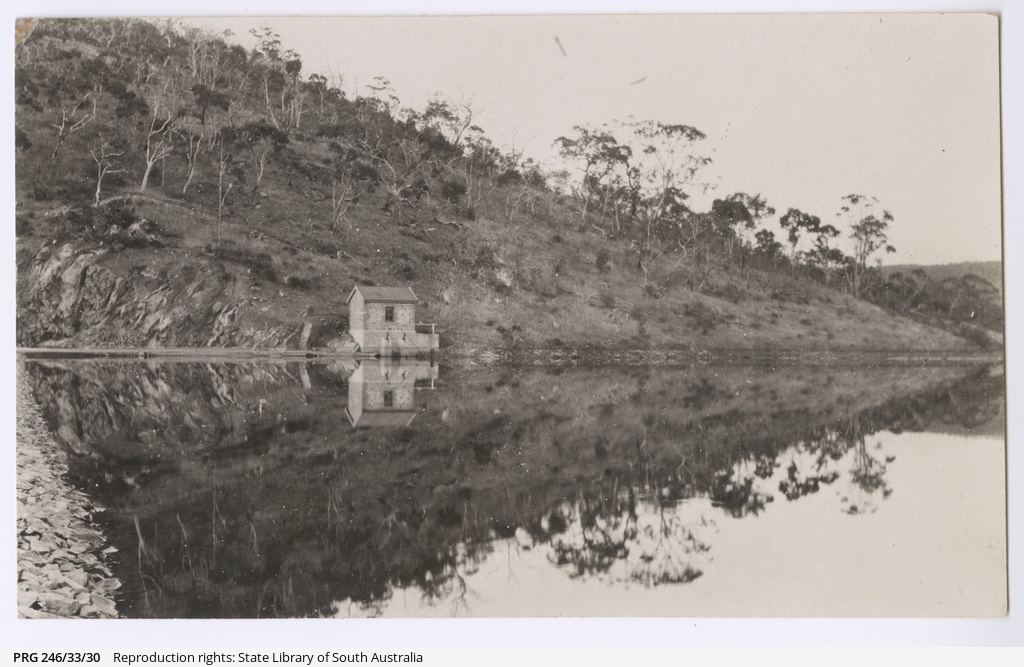
- The dam wall, in 1917

- Location of the dam in South Australia
- Interactive map of Hindmarsh Valley Dam
- Country: Australia
- Location: Hindmarsh Valley
- Coordinates: 35°28′12″S 138°36′02″E
- Purpose: Water supply
- Status: Decommissioned
- Construction began: November 1914
- Opening date: 25 June 1917
- Construction cost: A£69,000
- Owner: Government of South Australia
- Operator: SA Water

Dam and spillways
- Type of dam: Earth fill dam
- Impounds: Off-stream
- Height (foundation): 15 m (49 ft)
- Height (thalweg): 13.6 m (44.5 ft)
- Length: 232 m (761 ft)
- Elevation at crest: 69 m (226 ft) AHD
- Spillway type: Uncontrolled
- Spillway capacity: 58 m^{3}/s (2,000 cu ft/s)

Reservoir
- Creates: Hindmarsh Valley Reservoir
- Total capacity: 475 ML (385 acre⋅ft)
- Active capacity: 360 ML (290 acre⋅ft)
- Catchment area: 9 km^{2} (3.5 sq mi)
- Normal elevation: 67 m (220 ft) AHD

The Hindmarsh Valley Dam is a decommissioned off-stream earth-filled embankment dam, located in Hindmarsh Valley, approximately 11 kilometres (7 mi) north of the municipal seat in Victor Harbor, in South Australia. The dam was completed in 1917 and its resultant reservoir, the Hindmarsh Valley Reservoir, supplied potable water for Victor Harbor and environs. The reservoir has been used for recreational purposes since 2019; and for recycled water storage.

== Overview ==
The earth-filled dam is 15 metres (49 ft) high and 232 metres (761 ft) long. When full, the reservoir has the capacity of 475 megalitres (385 acre⋅ft), covers 10.9 hectares (27 acres), drawn from a relatively small catchment area of 9 square kilometres (3.5 sq mi). The uncontrolled spillway has a flow capacity of 58 cubic metres per second (2,000 cu ft/s).

The reservoir and its distribution system were designed and built by the state government’s Waterworks Department with construction being carried out from November 1914 to mid-1917. The majority of work involved the excavation of a natural depression and the construction of an embankment dam wall with a puddle core on land in section 159 of the cadastral unit of the Hundred of Goolwa. The reservoir was designed to receive water from two sources. The first was surface flow from a catchment which includes the hill known as Mount Billy to the immediate north and Peeralilla Hill to the immediate east. The second which was the main supply was obtained from the Hindmarsh River to the immediate west via an intake consisting of an intake chamber and a system of 0.61 metres (24 in) diameter reinforced concrete pipes.

Its original purpose was to supply only Victor Harbor, Middleton and Port Elliott, however water mains were extended to Goolwa after its residents petitioned the state government.

In 1978, a new spillway was constructed.

In 1983, land consisting of sections 159 and 160 of the Hundred of Goolwa and which includes the reservoir and part of its catchment was listed on the now-defunct Register of the National Estate with the following statement of significance:

This is a significant stand of natural vegetation due to its size and the diversity of plant communities which include savannah woodland in a fairly natural state. Some fine specimens of SA blue gum (Eucalyptus leucoxylon) and rough barked manna gum (E. huberana) can be seen. The presence of a reservoir adds to the habitat diversity and aesthetic appeal.

On 12 August 1999, land to the immediate north of the reservoir was proclaimed under the National Parks and Wildlife Act 1972 as the Mount Billy Conservation Park, and transferred from SA Water to the Department of Environment and Natural Resources.

On 18 November 1999, the Government of South Australia announced that the reservoir would be decommissioned and would be replaced with a new facility known as the Nettle Hill Water Storage Facility. The new facility which is located on Nettle Hill Road to the immediate north-west of the reservoir would receive treated water from the Myponga Reservoir.

As of 2007, the reservoir was used to store "seasonal excess recycled water" produced by the Victor Harbor Waste Water Treatment Plant. In September 2014, the reservoir was one of five regional water storage facilities listed for potential reuse for recreational activities such as fishing. However, as of January 2018, the necessary approvals had not been granted for recreational use of the reservoir.

== See also ==
- List of reservoirs and dams in South Australia
