= Mount Lofty Ranges =

Mountain range in South Australia

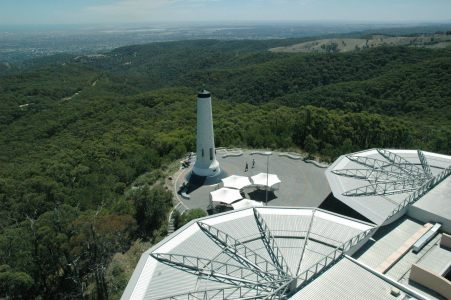
- The summit of Mount Lofty

Highest point
- Peak: Mount Bryan
- Elevation: 936 m (3,071 ft); AHD
- Isolation: 102.07 km (63.42 mi)
- Coordinates: 33°25′34″S 138°58′28″E

Dimensions
- Length: 300 km (190 mi) N–S
- Area: 1,640 km^{2} (630 mi^{2})

Naming
- Etymology: Mount Lofty

Geography
- Location within South Australia
- Country: Australia
- State: South Australia
- Parent range: Adelaide Rift Complex

Geology
- Orogeny: Delamerian
- Rock age: Cambrian
- Mountain type: Fault-block mountain
- Rock type: Sedimentary

Climbing
- Normal route: Heysen Trail
- Access: South Eastern Freeway

The Mount Lofty Ranges are a range of mountains in the Australian state of South Australia which for a small part of its length borders the east of Adelaide. The part of the range in the vicinity of Adelaide is called the Adelaide Hills and defines the eastern border of the Adelaide Plains.

== Location and description ==
The Mount Lofty Ranges stretch from the southernmost point of the Fleurieu Peninsula at Cape Jervis northwards for over 300 kilometres (190 mi) before petering out north of Peterborough. In the vicinity of Adelaide, they separate the Adelaide Plains from the extensive plains that surround the Murray River and stretch eastwards to Victoria.

The Heysen Trail traverses almost the entire length of the ranges, crossing westwards to the Flinders Ranges near Hallett.

The mountains have a Mediterranean climate with moderate rainfall brought by south-westerly winds, hot summers and cool winters. The southern ranges are wetter (with 900 millimetres (35 in) of rain per year) than the northern ranges (400 millimetres (16 in)).

=== Southern ranges ===
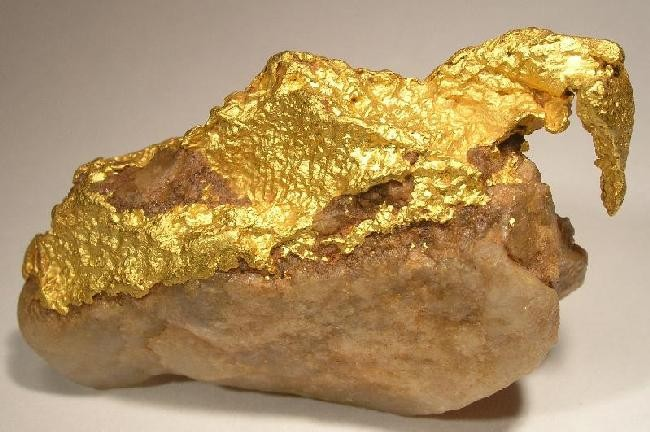
Unusual gold specimen from the old Victoria Gold Mine, probably the first gold mine worked in Australia, near Castambul.

The part of the ranges south of and including the Barossa Valley are commonly known as the South Mount Lofty Ranges, and the highest part of this section is the summit of Mount Lofty (710 m or 2,330 ft). The part of the ranges nearest Adelaide is called the Adelaide Hills and, further north, the Barossa Range.

The ranges encompass a wide variety of land usage, including significant residential development, particularly concentrated in the foothills, suburbs of Stirling and Bridgewater, and the towns Mount Barker and Victor Harbor in particular. Several pine plantation forests exist, most significantly around Mount Crawford and Cudlee Creek in the north and Kuitpo Forest and Second Valley in the south. Several protected areas exist near Adelaide where the hills face the city in order to preserve highly sought-after residential land: Black Hill Conservation Park, Cleland National Park and Belair National Park are the largest. The other significant parks in the southern ranges are Deep Creek National Park, on the rugged southern shores of the Fleurieu Peninsula, and Para Wirra Conservation Park at the southern edge of the Barossa Valley.

There are many wineries in the ranges. Two wine regions in particular are world-renowned: the Barossa Valley and McLaren Vale. Grapes are also grown in the Adelaide Hills and the Onkaparinga Valley.

Although no major mines operate in the southern ranges today, there are several large disused ones, and a myriad of small ones. An iron sulfide mine at Brukunga, northeast of Mount Barker, operated from 1955 to 1972, proving a valuable source for the production of superphosphate fertilisers vital for the postwar development of the State's outlying agricultural areas. The runoff from the mine unfortunately proved quite toxic for the local environment, and efforts have been underway since to alleviate the damage.

A small short-lived silver and lead mine in the foothills of the ranges at Glen Osmond was first opened just two years after the founding of the State in 1836: it is significant for being not only the first metal mine in the history of the State, but the first in all Australia. South Australia never experienced a nineteenth-century gold rush like those interstate, but gold was mined near both Echunga and Williamstown (in the Barossa). Other mines in the southern ranges include a nineteenth-century silver-lead mine at Talisker near Cape Jervis, which features many remaining old buildings, and the limestone mine at Rapid Bay, which ceased operations much more recently. Copper was mined at Kapunda, Truro and Kanmantoo and may be again and a zinc (and lead, silver and gold) mine is proposed near Strathalbyn. Quarries dot the ranges, the most spectacular and massive of which are in the Adelaide foothills; they supplied much of the quartzite which is to be seen in the enduring "sandstone architecture" of early Adelaide.

Today, only a single railway crosses the ranges: the major Adelaide to Melbourne railway line, which was first constructed in the 1870s and has had only minor realignments since (the most significant of which was the boring of a new tunnel at Sleeps Hill). Passenger services used to run from the city to Bridgewater in the heart of the hills and ranges, but now stop at Belair in the foothills. A railway approached the ranges at Willunga (although it was closed and removed in the 1960s and has since been replaced by a cycling trail). The Victor Harbor railway line (now used only for recreational purposes) largely skirts the eastern edge of the ranges. North of Adelaide, there was a railway to Angaston in the east of the Barossa Valley, and former railways to Truro and across the ranges near Eudunda to Morgan on the Murray River.

The ranges form part of the water supply for Adelaide, and there is an extensive infrastructure of reservoirs, weirs, and pipelines, on the Torrens, Onkaparinga, Little Para and Gawler River catchments. Mount Bold, South Para, Kangaroo Creek, and Millbrook reservoirs are the largest.

=== Northern ranges ===
The northern ranges, often confused with the southern Flinders Ranges, and sometimes referred to as the "Mid-North ranges" or "central hill country", stretch from hills near Kapunda in the south to arid ranges beyond Peterborough in the northeast. The highest peak in this section (and in all the Mount Lofty Ranges – despite the name) is Mount Bryan (936 m or 3,071 ft). Other significant peaks include New Campbell Hill (714 m or 2,343 ft) and Stein Hill (605 m or 1,985 ft), which overlooks Burra.

The northern ranges include Belvidere Range, Tothill Range and the Skilly Hills.

Mining, although totally absent today, was once a major industry in the northern ranges. The copper mine at Kapunda, just north of the Barossa, operated from 1842 to 1877 and was a major boost to the infant State's economy, but was soon overshadowed by the large workings at Burra, further north. The mine here operated from 1845 to 1877 with a few minor interruptions, and was superseded by even larger workings on the Yorke Peninsula. As testament to the volume of copper at Burra, however, the mine re-opened as an open-cut in 1971, before closing again ten years later.

The Clare Valley lies in a shallow fold of the northern Mount Lofty Ranges just southwest of Burra. It is yet another world-class wine-producing area, and is a very popular weekend tourist destination for people living in Adelaide. It is also home to the only conservation park in the northern ranges, Spring Gully.

The northern end of the ranges are home to two curiosities: a tiny township by the name of Yongala, familiar to South Australians for commonly being the coldest place in the state (being a hundred kilometres inland, and on a somewhat elevated plateau as with much of the Mid North). The other curiosity is a locality near Orroroo called "Magnetic Hill". The name stems from an optical illusion that creates the impression that a car rolls uphill.

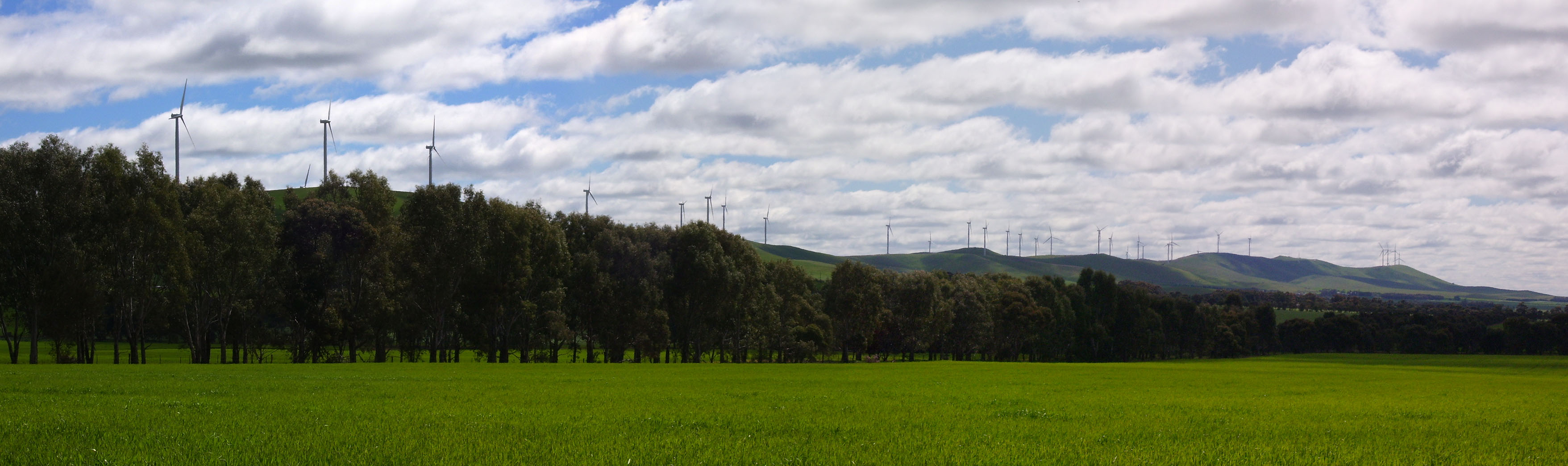
Wind turbines northwest of Burra.

== Geomorphology ==
The ranges are part of the Adelaide Rift Complex. The southern ranges and slopes of Mount Lofty overlooking the Adelaide Plains have been block-faulted to form a half-graben structure. The ranges when viewed from the beach or city have a "stepped" appearance, reflected in an early name for the ranges, "The Tiers".

There are several major normal faults in the Adelaide region, trending northeast to southwest defining these blocks:

- Para Fault. This runs from Gawler in the north, through Elizabeth, before disappearing under younger alluvium in the inner northern suburbs. The scarp which this fault has formed is covered with houses in the northern suburbs (Para Hills) and the township of Gawler is nestled at its base where the South Para River emerges from the range. Closer to the city the scarp becomes less defined and is unidentifiable beyond the low hill upon which North Adelaide rests.
- Eden-Burnside Fault Zone. This fault zone (composed of several different individual faults) lies at the base of the main scarp of the Adelaide Hills, separating the young Quaternary alluvium of the plains from the Proterozoic sedimentary rocks making up the ranges. It begins around One Tree Hill in the northern suburbs and extends as an escarpment of approximately 200 metres (660 ft) high in a slightly curving line for about 30 km (19 mi) before encountering the sea at Marino. This escarpment is known as the "Hills Face Zone" and is subject to special zoning restrictions; house prices are very high, as is demand for land, owing to the magnificent views, but many in the community are concerned with maintaining green hills as a background to the plains. A number of creeks cut deep notches in the scarp; one of these, Glen Osmond Creek, provides the site for the major road east out of Adelaide, now called the South Eastern Freeway; only a handful of other major roads extend up the scarp.
- Kitchener Fault. This long fault, just a little further to the east, extends from north of the Barossa Valley past the Torrens gorge to meet the Eden Fault in the vicinity of Greenhill. It is most apparent as a fault scarp around Williamstown and Kersbrook.
- Clarendon Fault. Running largely parallel to the Eden-Burnside Fault, this forms the escarpment within Belair National Park, which also runs south-east to form the eastern boundary of the southern suburbs, before ending at Old Noarlunga, where the Onkaparinga River emerges from the ranges. An escarpment also extends from the northern end of this fault to form the upper 'tier' of Mount Lofty: Measdays Hill (now carved in half by a massive cutting for the SE Freeway at Crafers West) and Mount Lofty itself are at the top of this scarp.
- Willunga Fault. This fault runs parallel to the Clarendon Fault, further south once more, and is the southernmost of the faults. The escarpment it lies at the base of is similarly dramatic, beginning in the Scott Creek Conservation Park and running southwest: Mount Bold Reservoir forms where the Onkaparinga River has been dammed in the middle of the escarpment. Further south, the townships of Kangarilla and Willunga nestle in gullies of the scarp, and the increasingly dramatic and bare face of "The Range", as it is known (properly Sellicks Hill Range) meets the sea at Sellicks Beach.
- Bremer and Palmer Fault Zones. These faults are at the eastern edge of the Mount Lofty Ranges block, and form even more dramatic escarpments than those in the west due to the general lack of the vegetation in the countryside. The latter fault zone is the eastern edge of the metamorphosed Proterozoic rocks of the Kanmantoo group; to the east lie the younger sediments of the Murray River. Towns like Palmer, Sedan, and Cambrai, lie at the foot of the scarp.

All the fault zones are still active today, along with the rest of the ranges, and minor earthquakes are relatively common. Larger quakes in the southern ranges are fairly rare: the last to hit a major centre was the 1954 Adelaide earthquake that occurred on 1 March. It measured 5.5 on the Richter scale.

A significant aspect of the geology of the Adelaide area is a number of Tertiary marine sands deposits, many of which have been extensively quarried. One of these deposits is around the outer-northern suburb of Golden Grove; another area is around McLaren Vale.

== Ecology ==
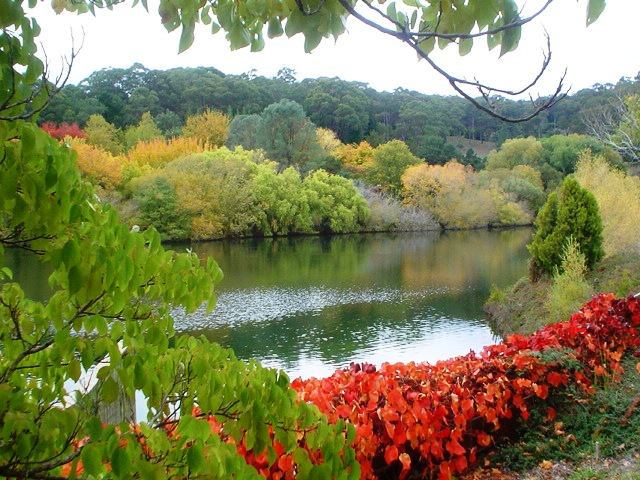
Mount Lofty Botanic Garden

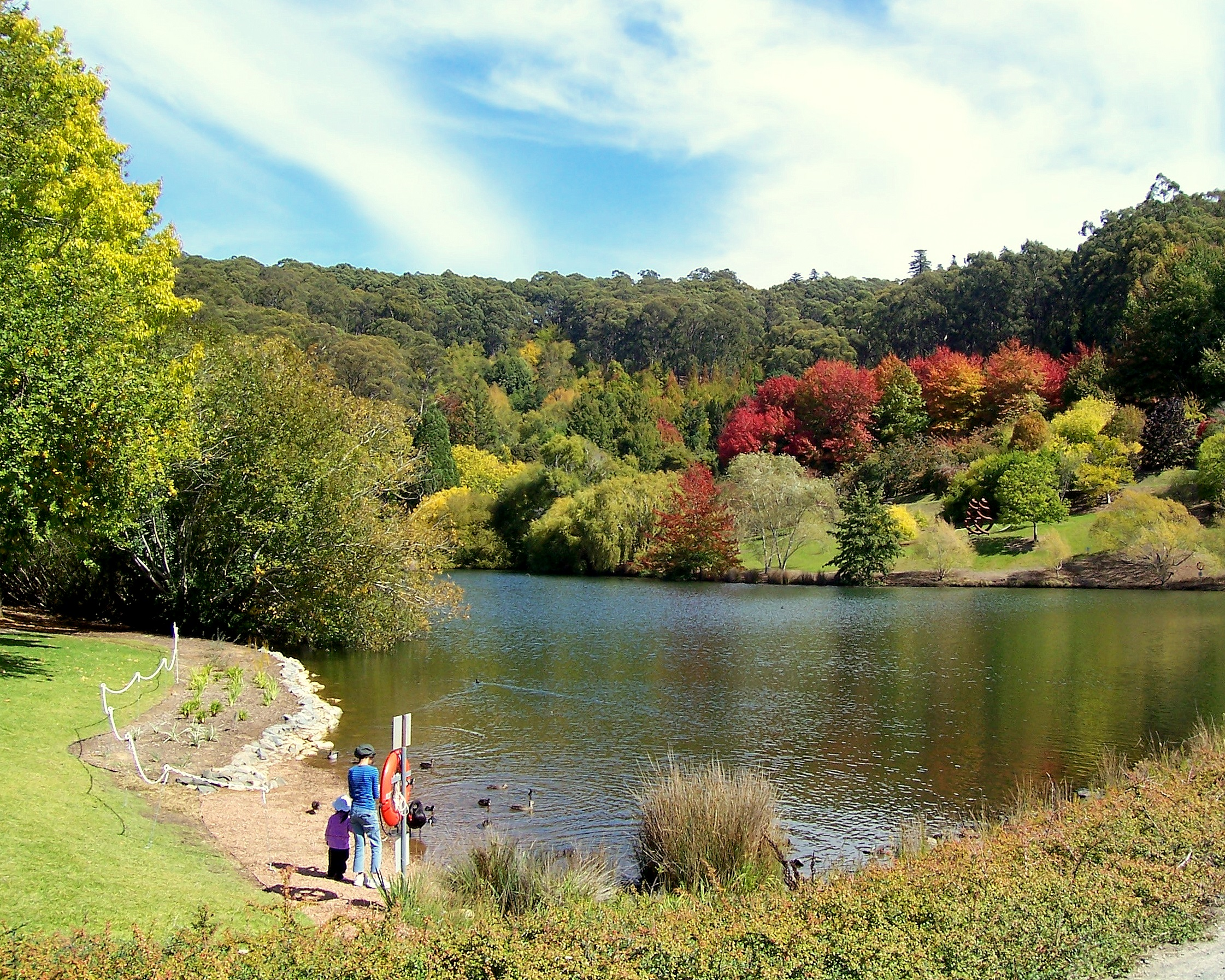
Mount Lofty Botanic Garden Lake

=== Flora ===
The natural habitat of the mountainsides is woodland of eucalyptus trees mixed with golden wattle acacia trees on the lower slopes, all with an undergrowth of shrubs and herbs. The flowers include a number of endemic orchids. Similar habitats can be found on the offshore Kangaroo Island which is included by the World Wildlife Fund in the Mount Lofty woodlands ecoregion.

=== Fauna ===
The mountains are home to a number of marsupials such as the koala, western gray kangaroo, southern brown bandicoot along with the egg laying echidna. Birds include the southern emu-wren which is endemic to the Fleurieu Peninsula. There are a number of reptiles including the endangered Adelaide pygmy blue-tongue skink.

=== Threats and preservation ===
Biodiversity losses have been severe in the ranges due to the clearance of temperate woodlands. The hillsides have largely been cleared of woodland for fruit growing and other agriculture and the urban growth of Adelaide particularly on the lower slopes, leading to loss of habitat and local extinction of wildlife species including all species of bettong and quoll marsupials and birds including regent honeyeater (Xanthomyza phrygia), swift parrot (Lathamus discolor), king quail (Coturnix chinensis), brown quail (C. ypsilophora), and azure kingfisher (Alcedo azurea). Clearance and agriculture are ongoing and livestock grazing continues to cause damage to habitats while introduced cats, foxes and rabbits are a threat to habitats and wildlife. Protected areas tend to be small and fragmented.

== See also ==
- Flinders Ranges
- McLaren Vale (wine)
- Barossa Valley (wine)
