= List of VFL/AFL and AFL Women's players from South Australia =

This is a list of players from South Australia to have played in the Australian Football League (AFL) and the AFL Women's (AFLW), the two pre-eminent competitions of Australian rules football.

Note that prior to the full professionalism of the game and the expansion of the Victorian competition nationally during the 1980s, most top level South Australians played in the state-based SANFL competition and represented South Australia in interstate matches.

== Men's ==
=== Current player gallery ===
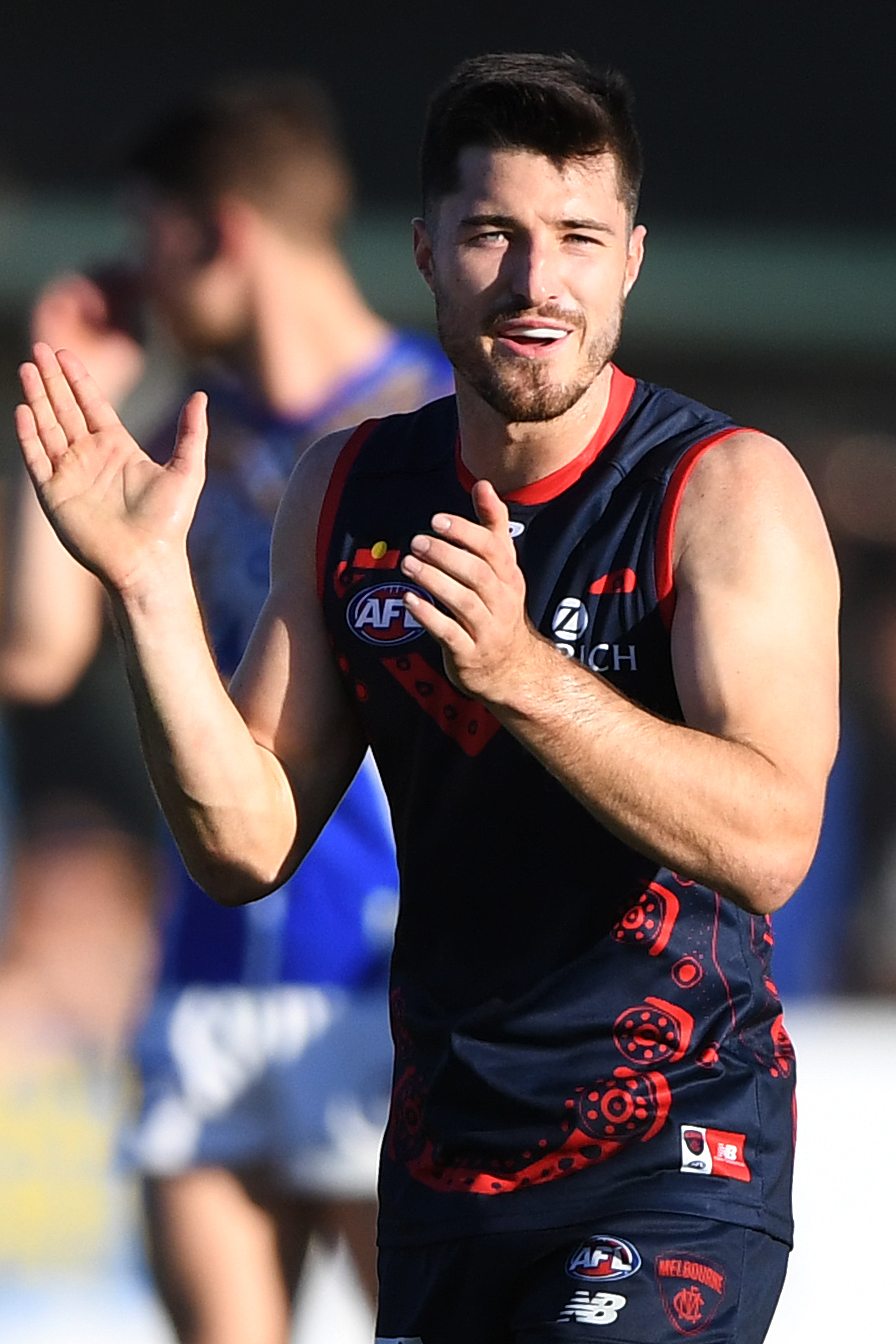
Alex Neal-Bullen is from Adelaide

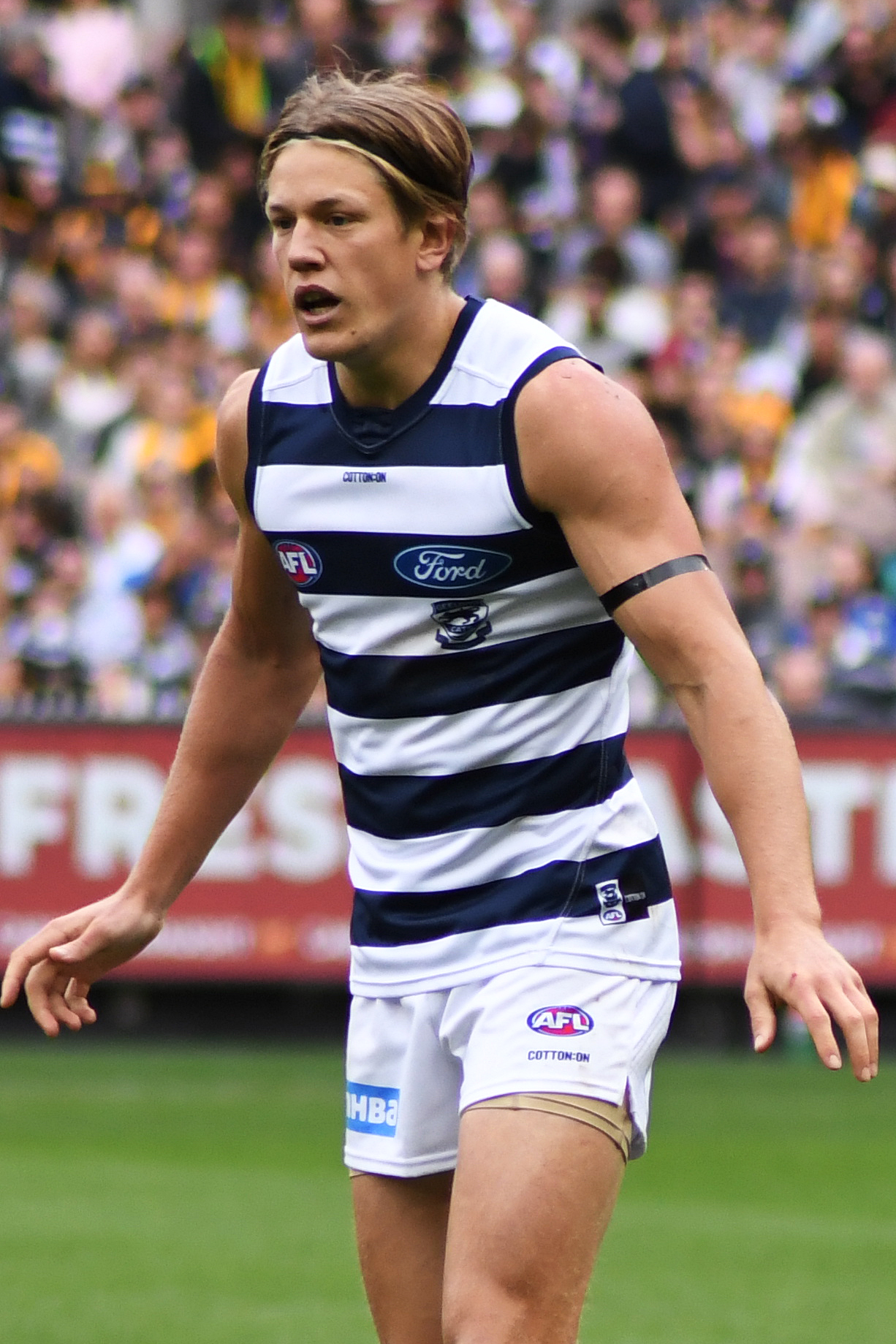
Rhys Stanley is from Berri

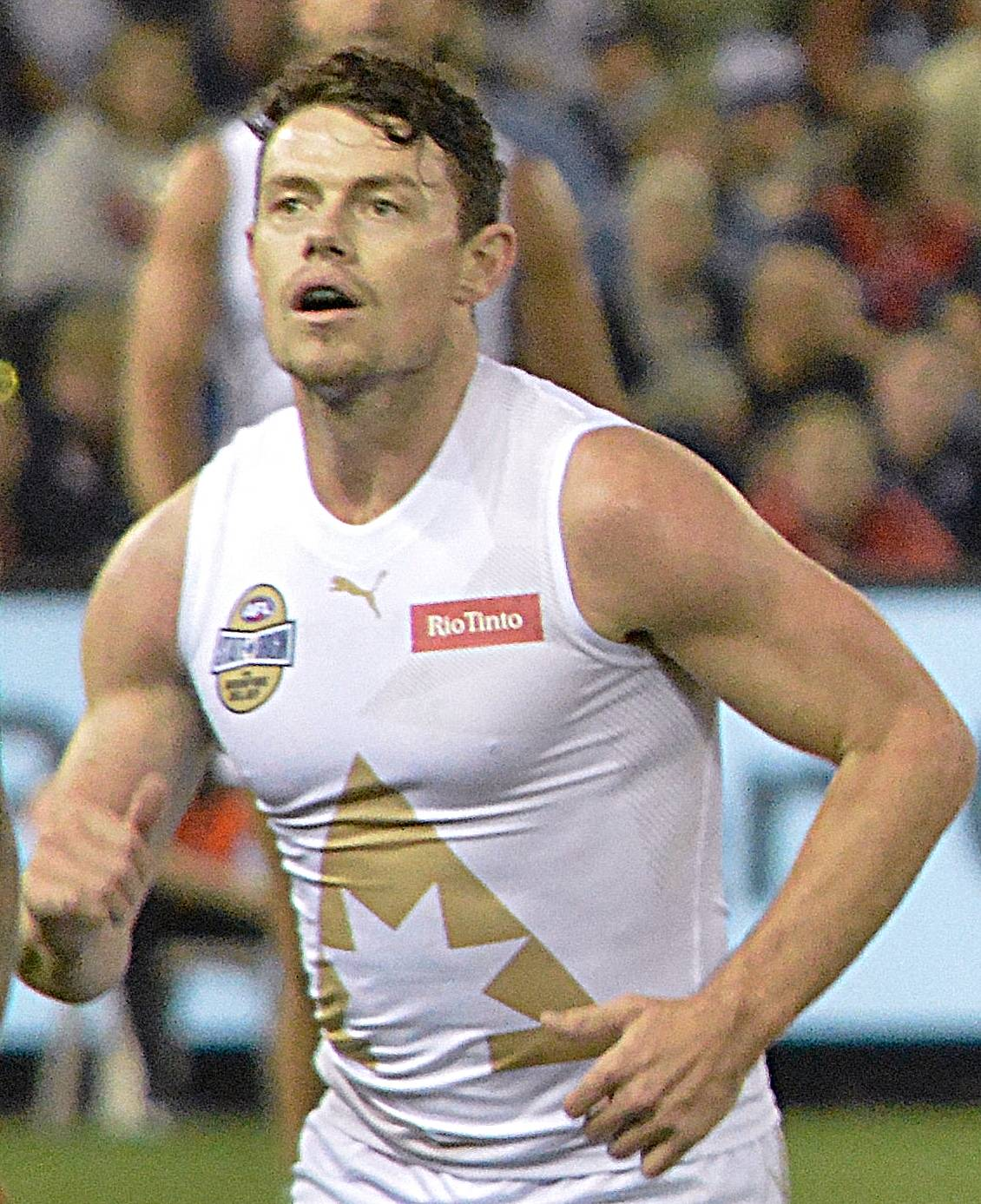
Lachie Neale is from Naracoorte and Kybybolite

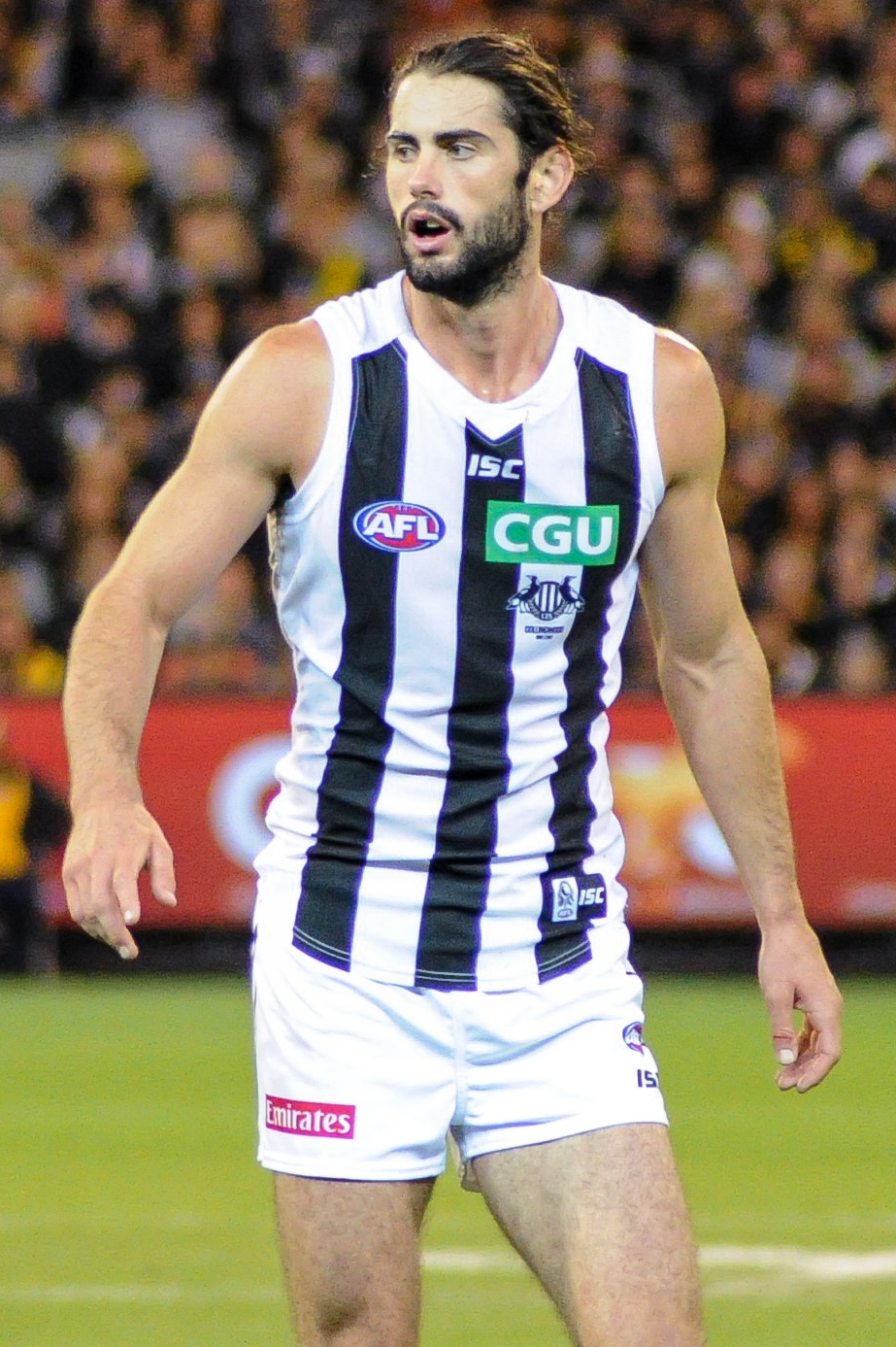
Brodie Grundy is from Adelaide

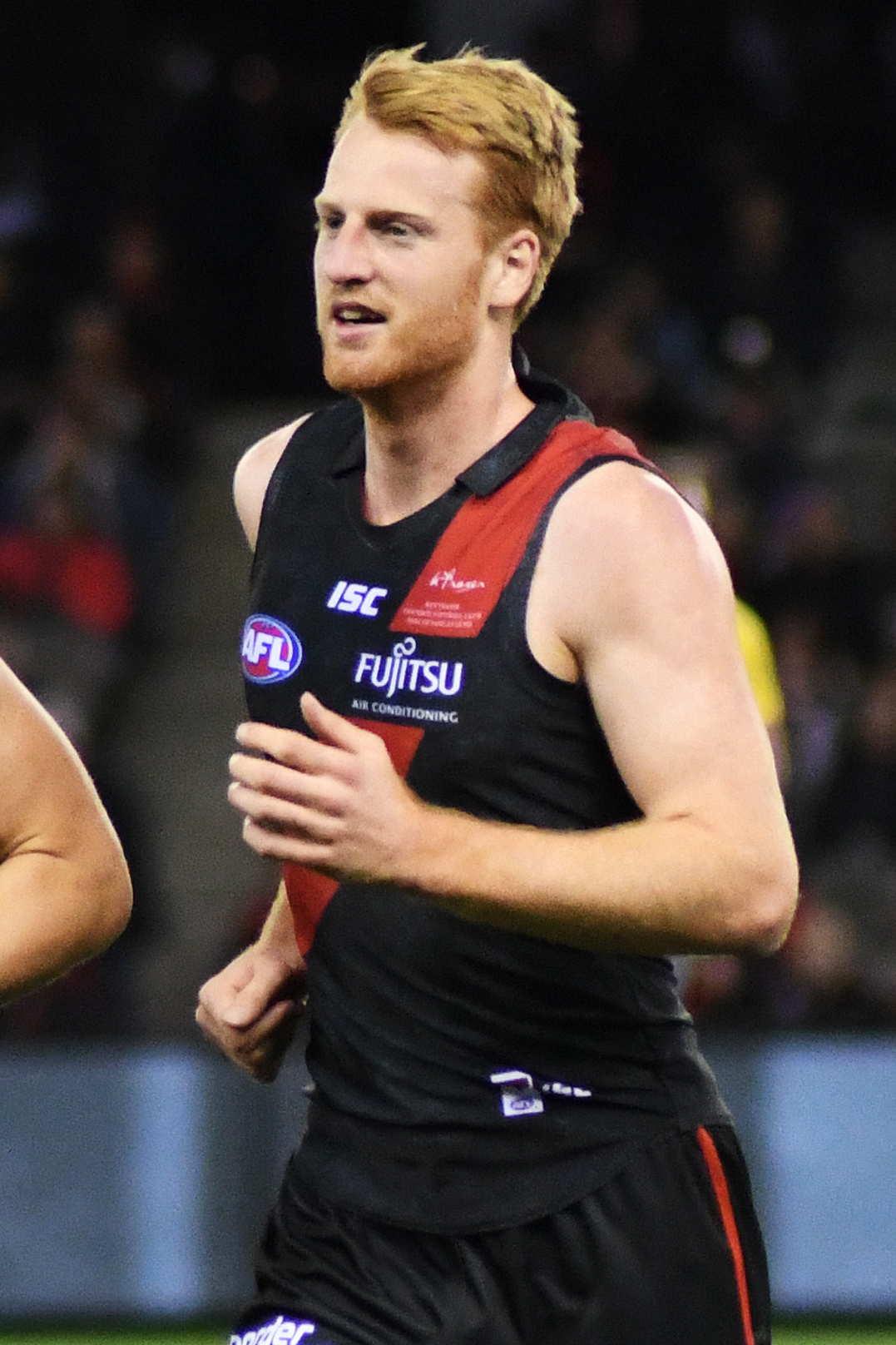
Aaron Francis is from Adelaide

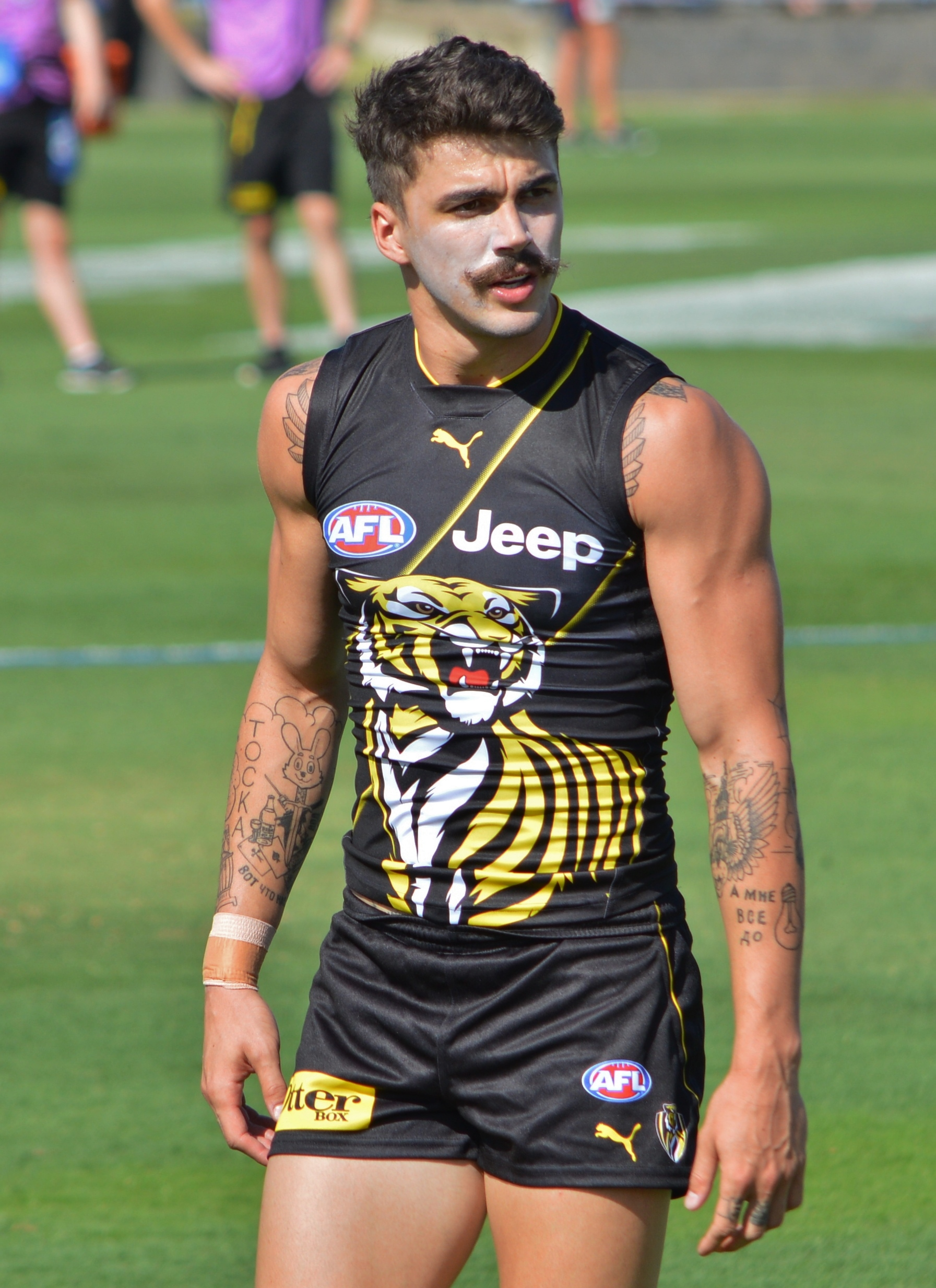
Oleg Markov is from Adelaide

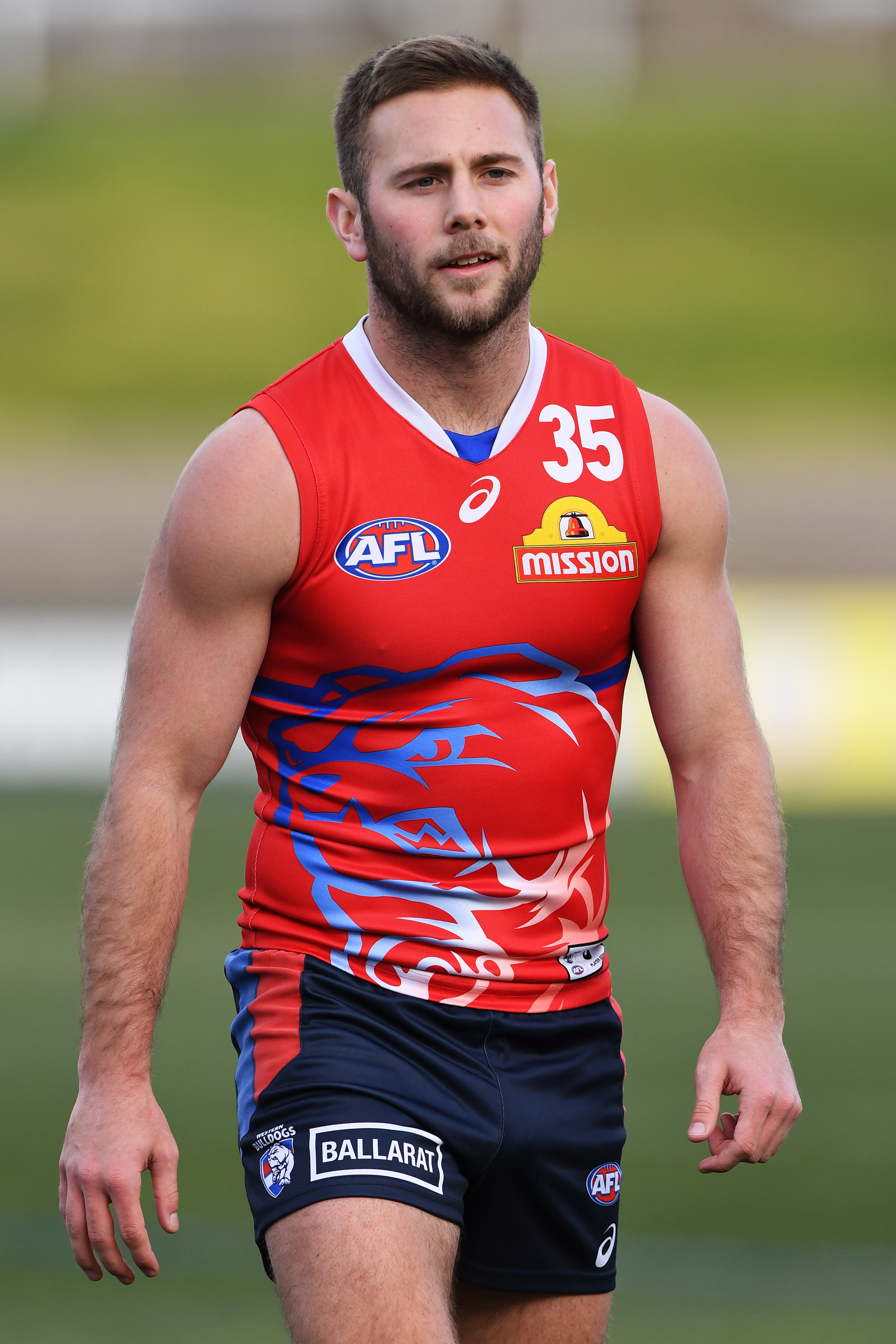
Caleb Daniel is from Adelaide

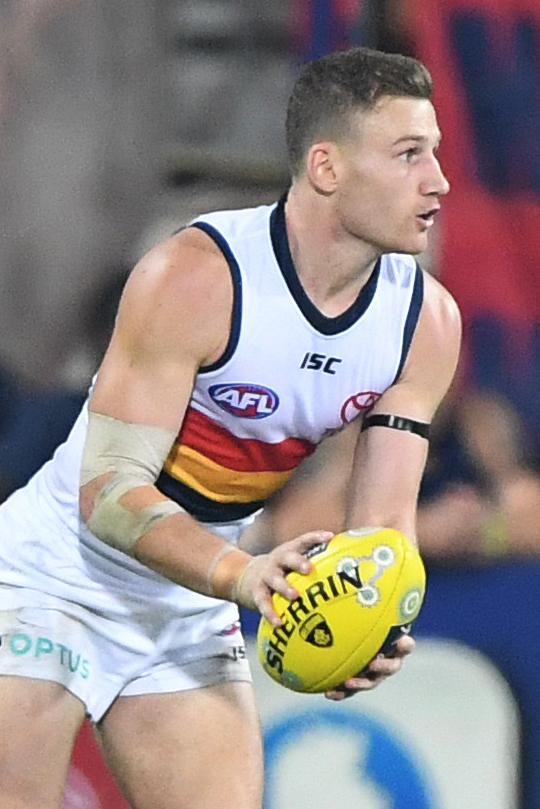
Rory Laird is from Adelaide

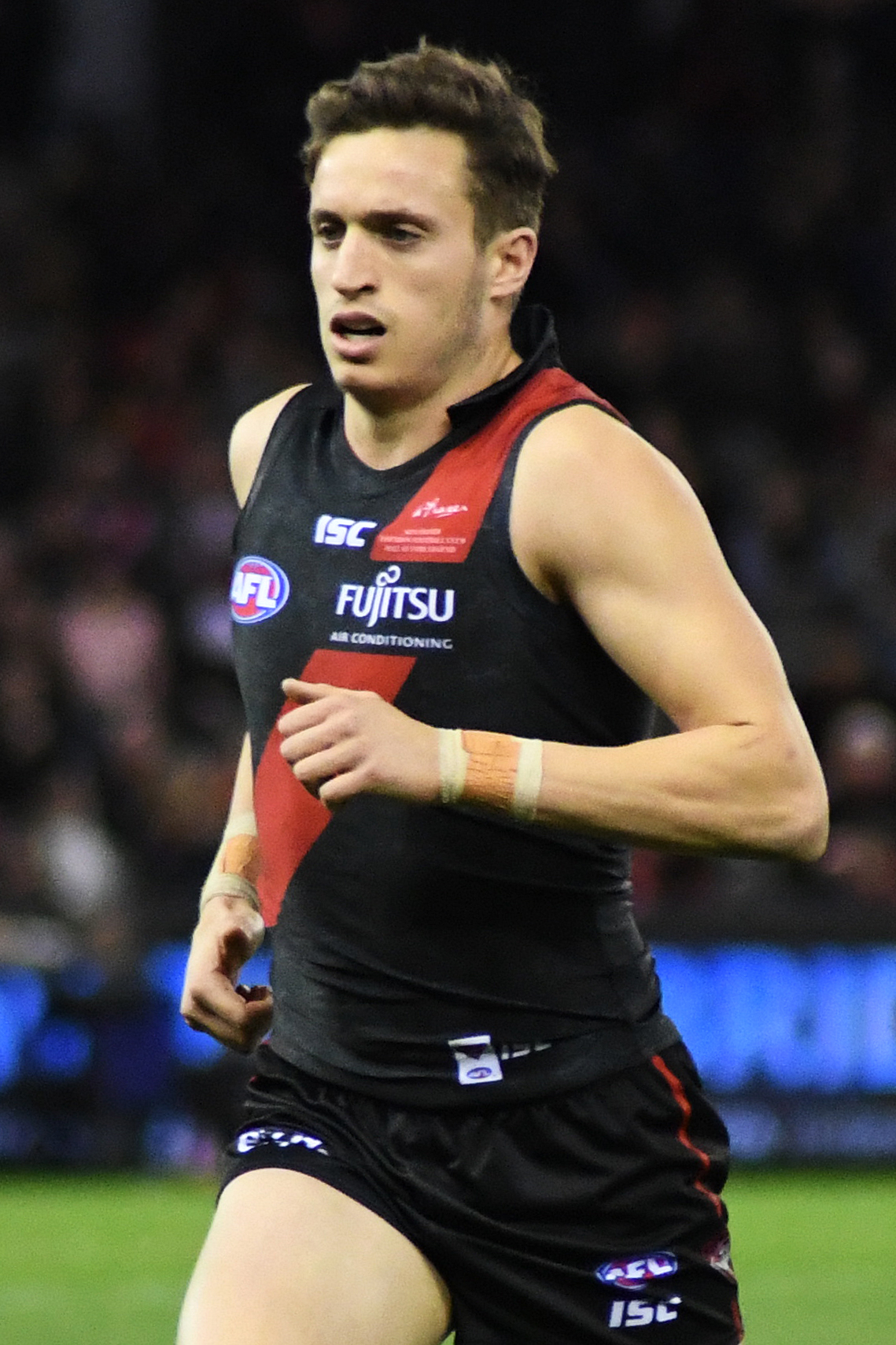
Orazio Fantasia is from Adelaide

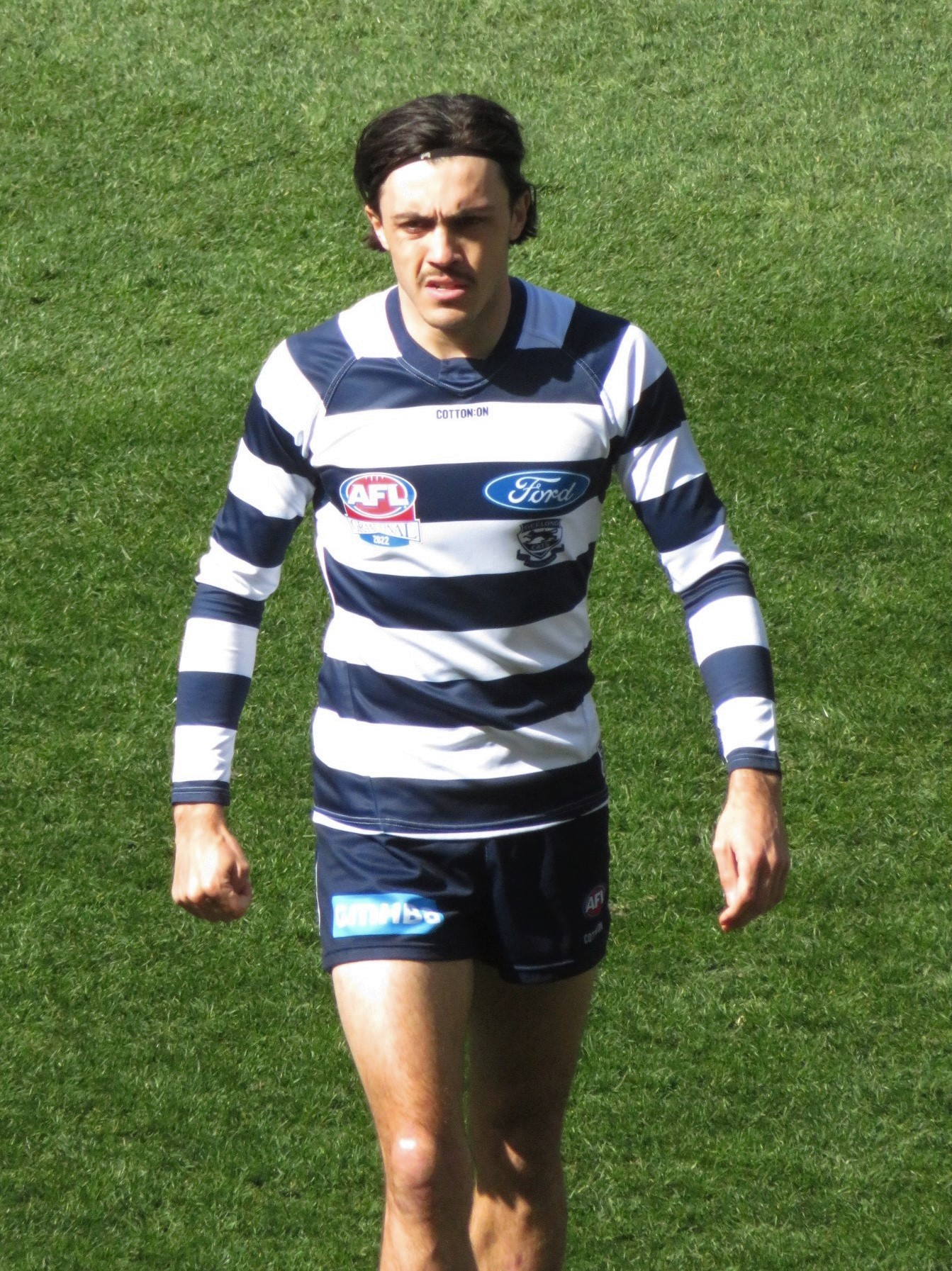
Brad Close is from Mount Gambier

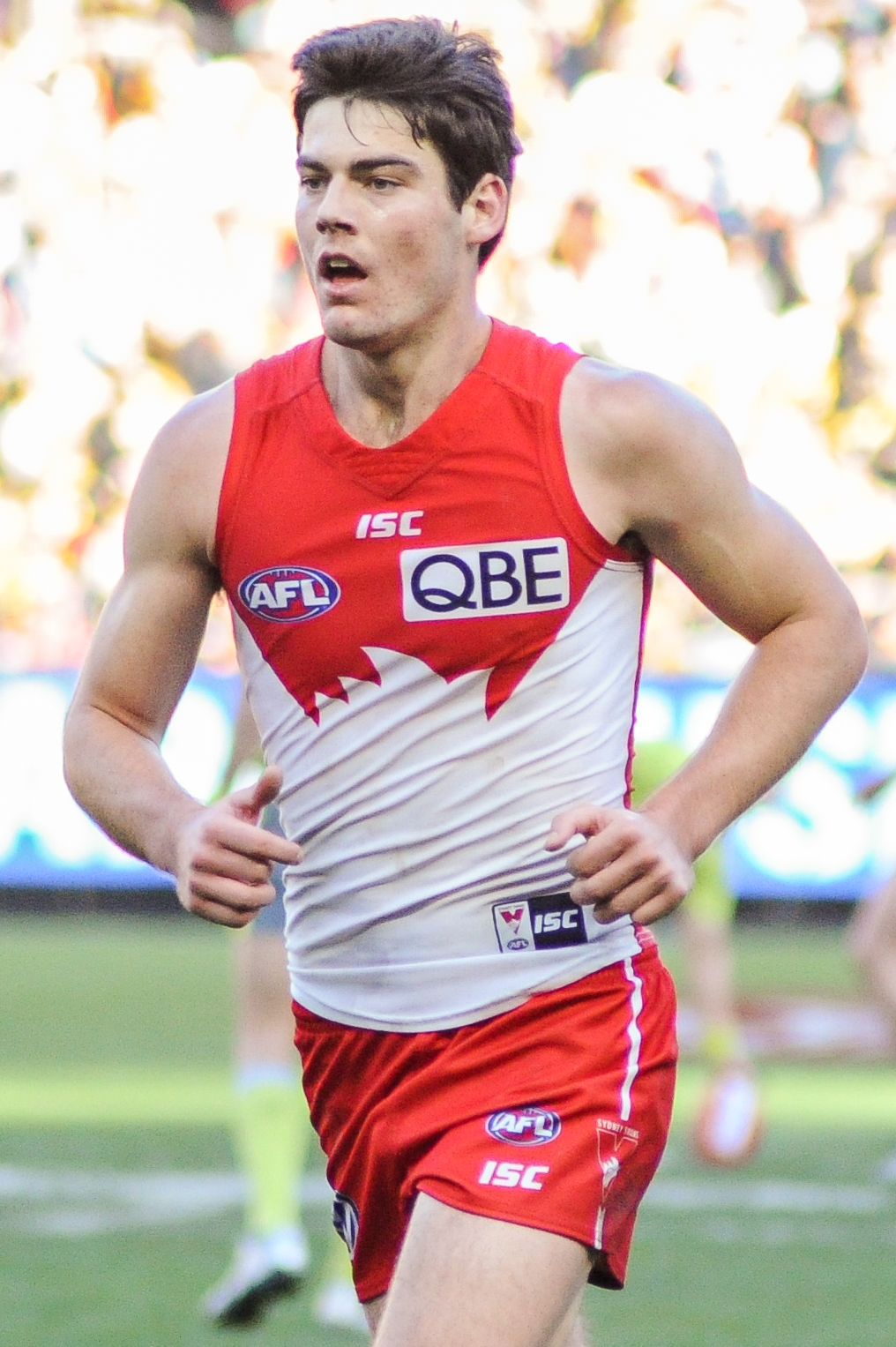
George Hewett is from Adelaide

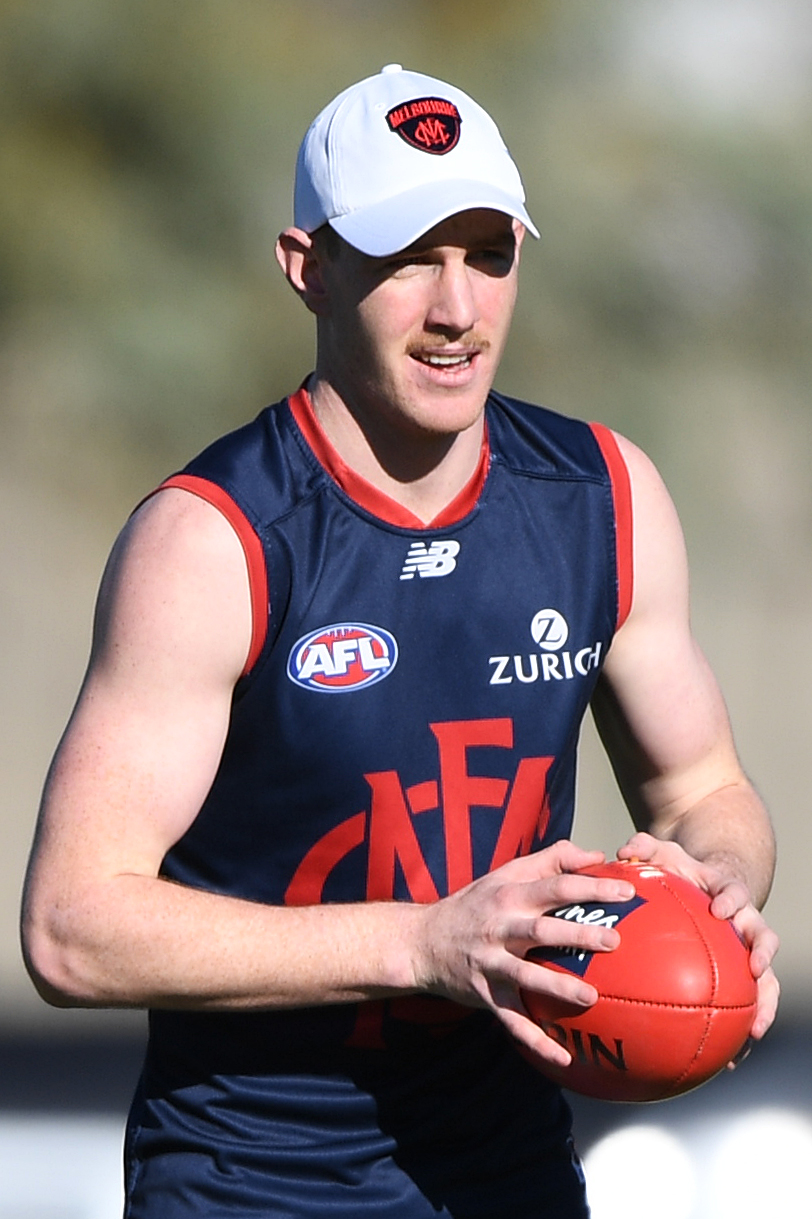
Harrison Petty is from Wudinna

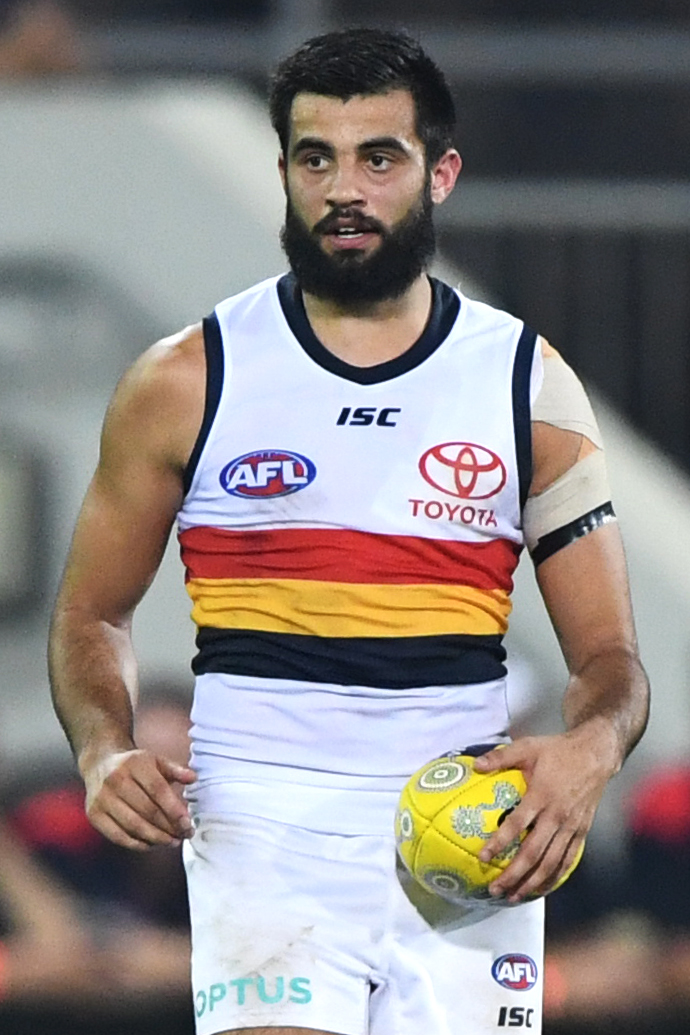
Wayne Milera is from Adelaide

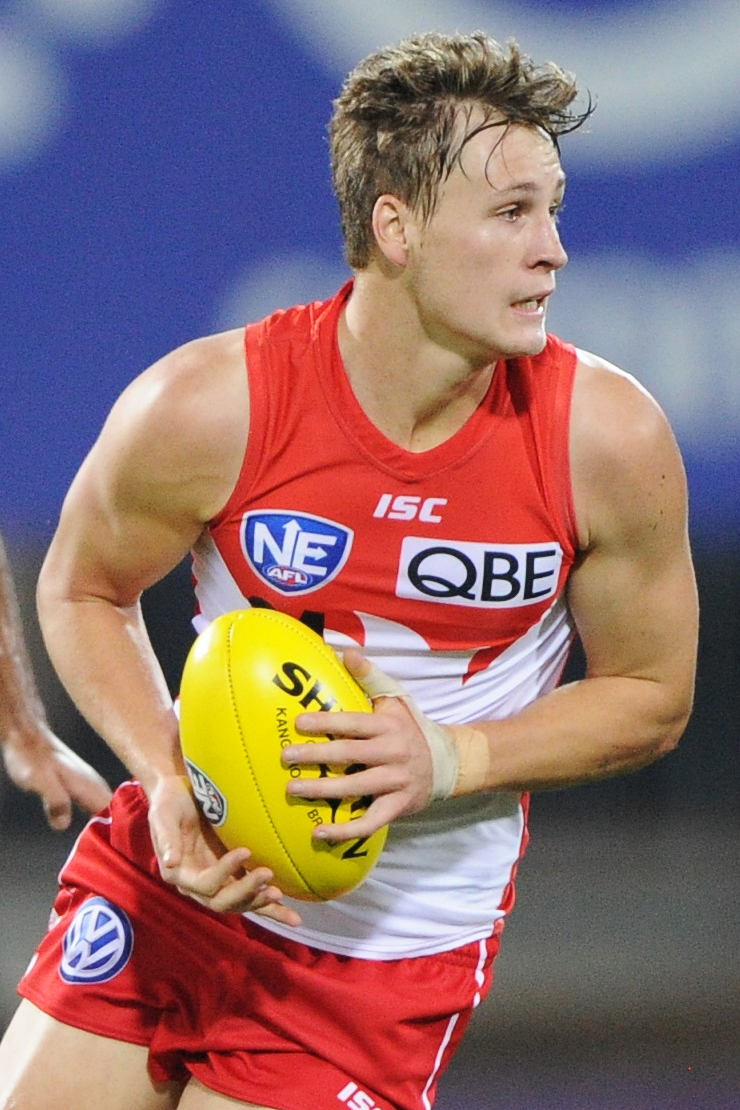
Jordan Dawson is from Kingston SE

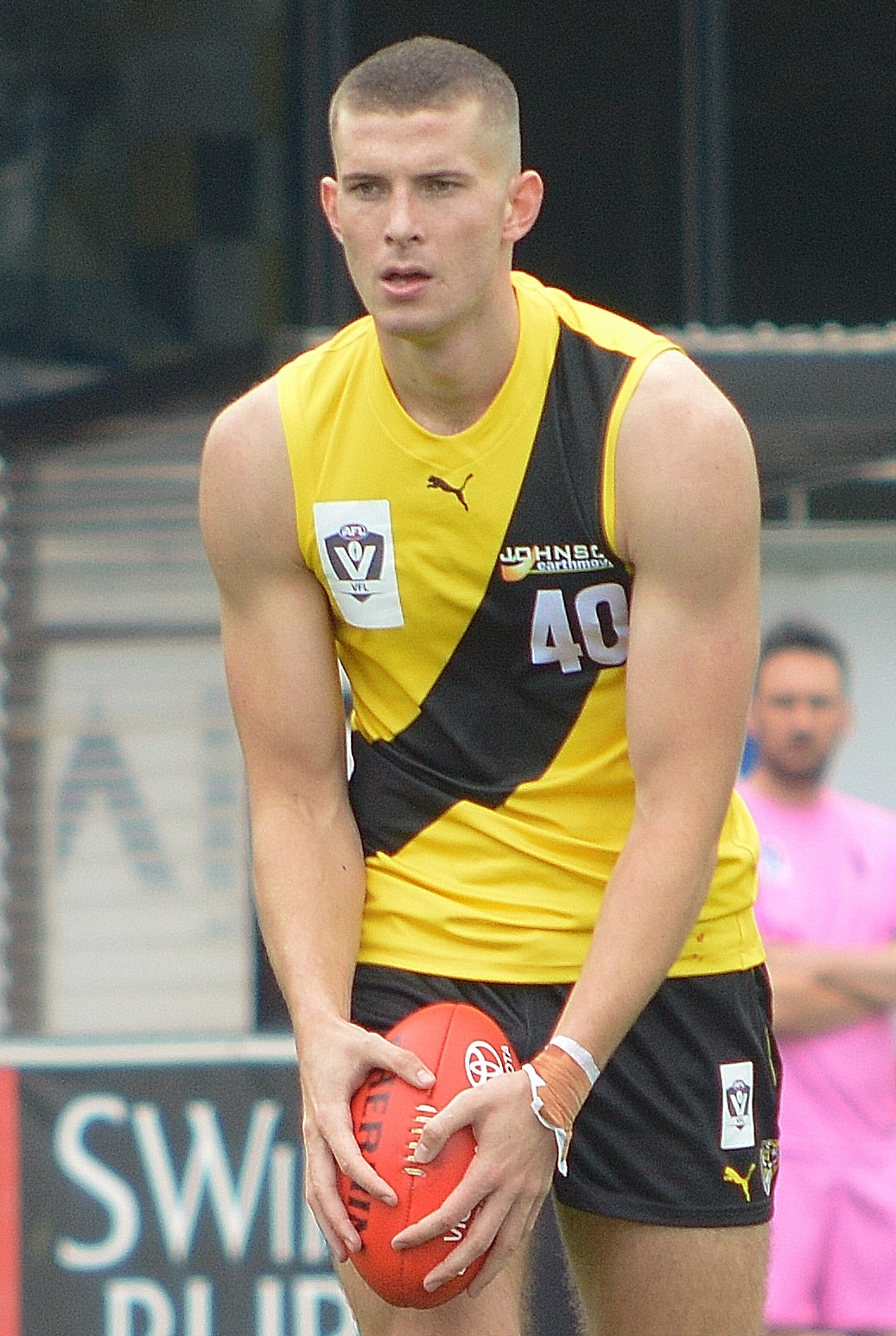
Callum Coleman-Jones is from Adelaide

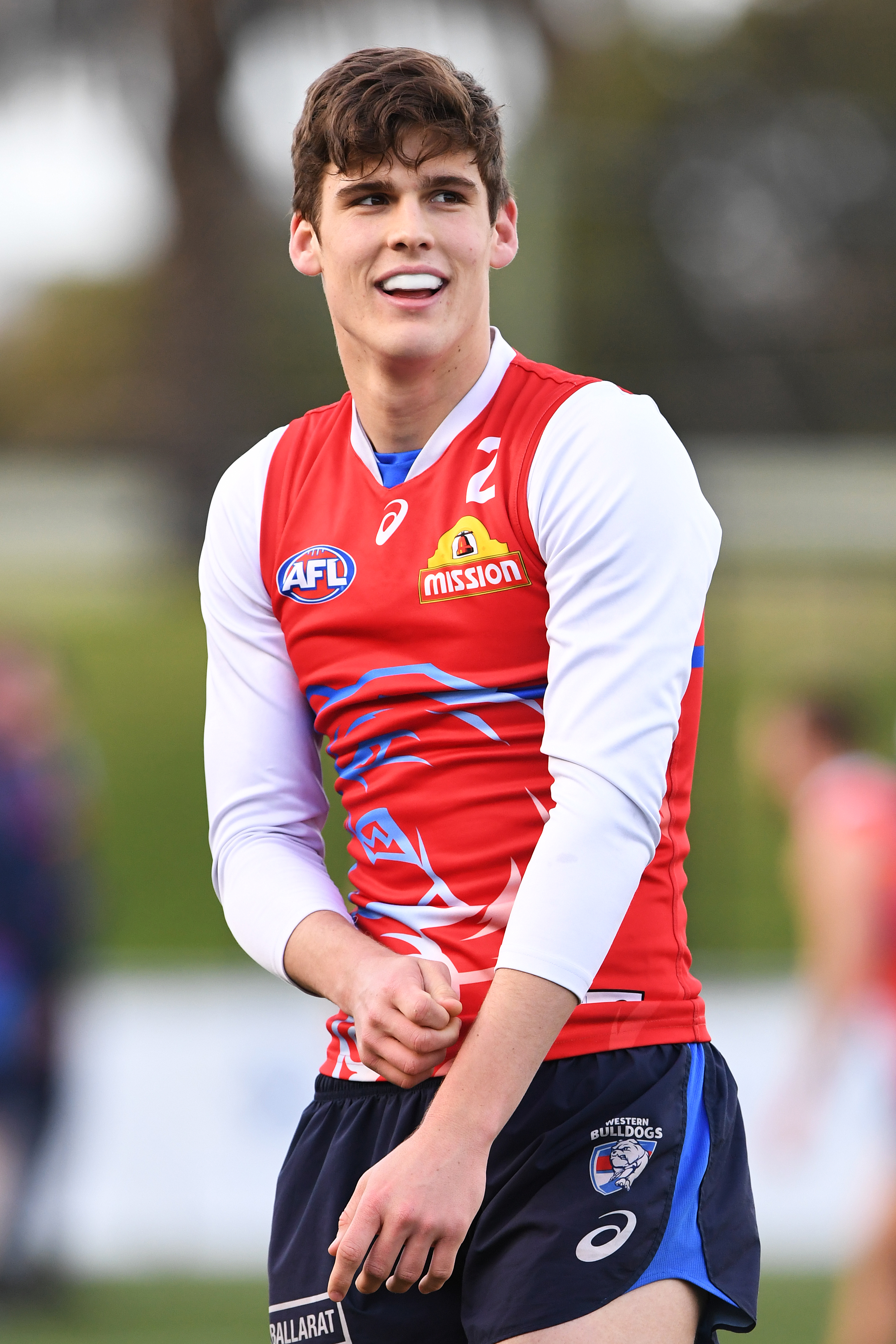
Lewis Young is from Adelaide

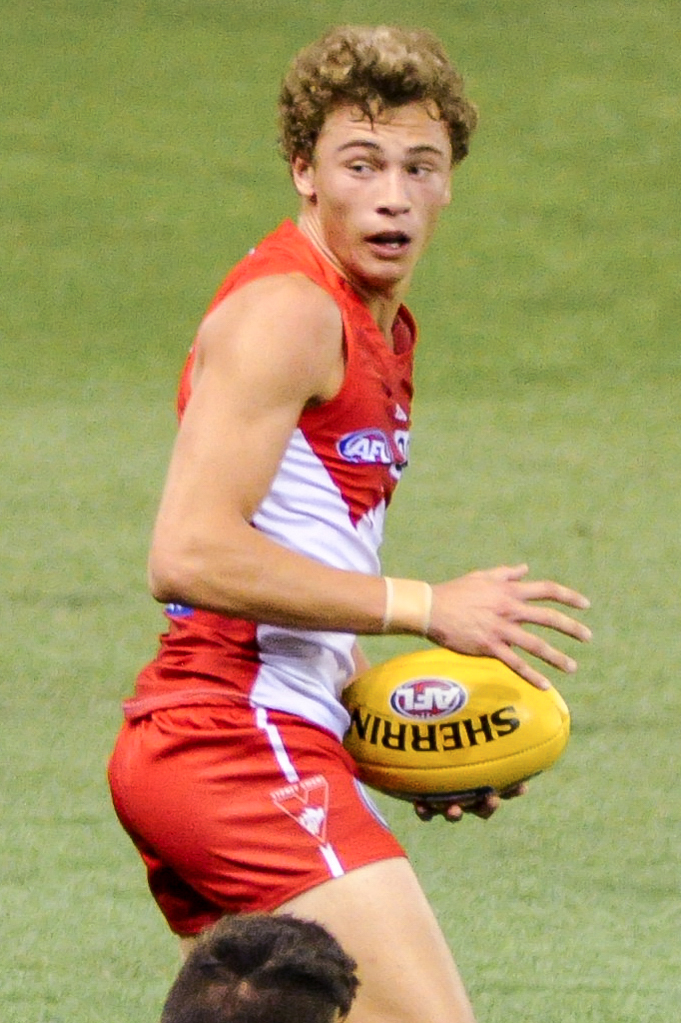
Will Hayward is from Adelaide

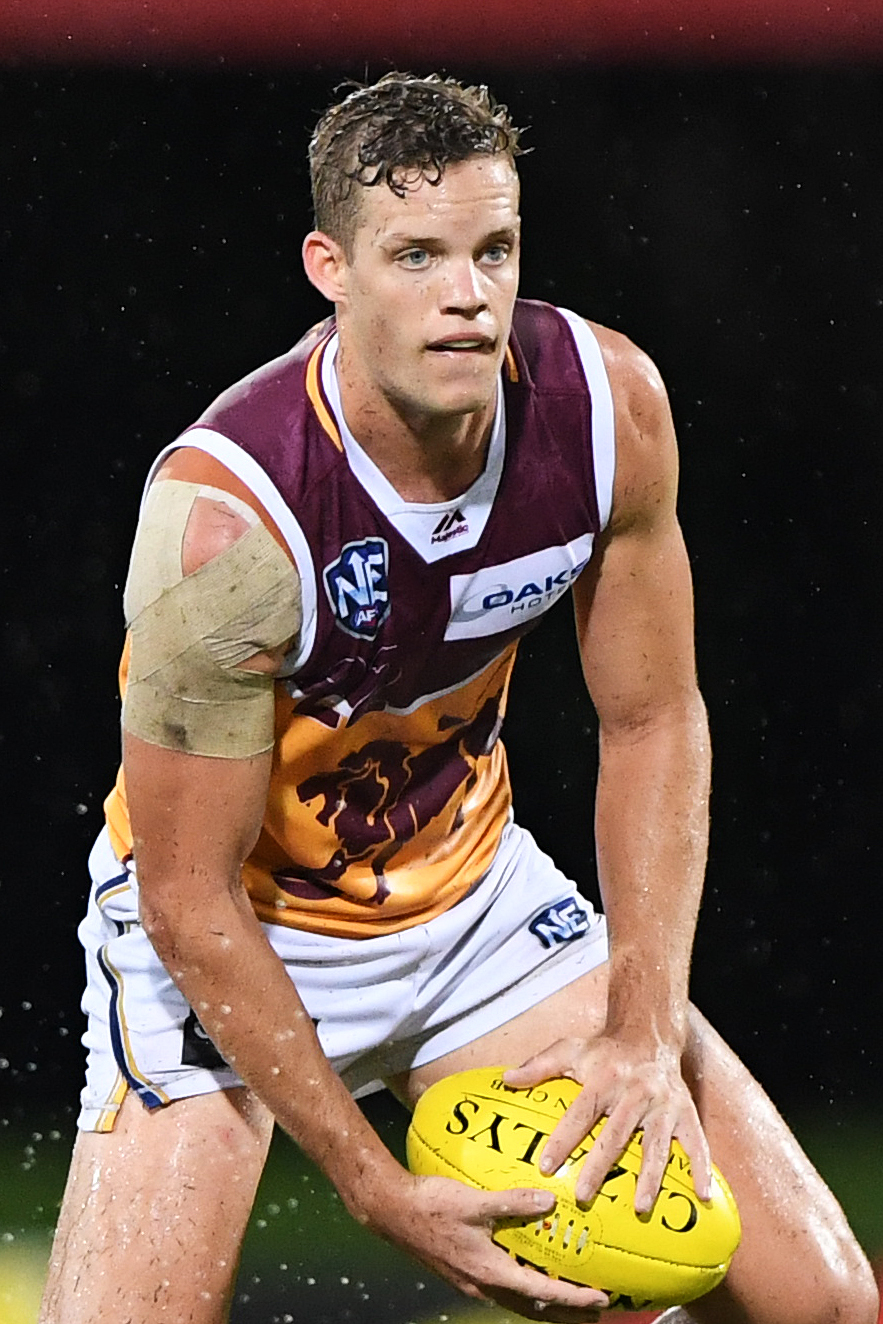
Mitch Hinge is from Adelaide

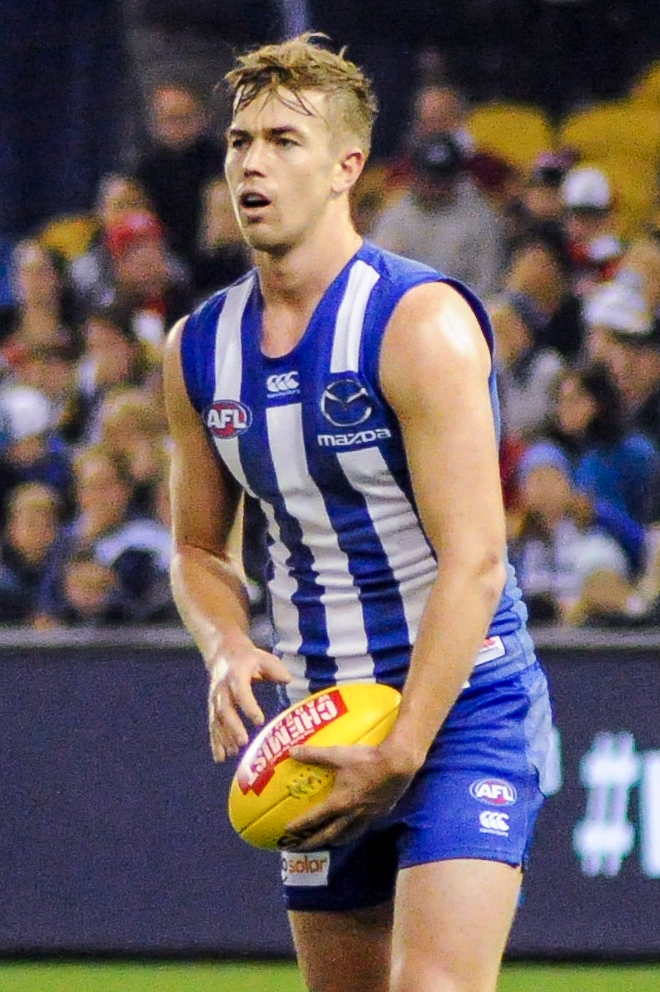
Trent Dumont is from Adelaide

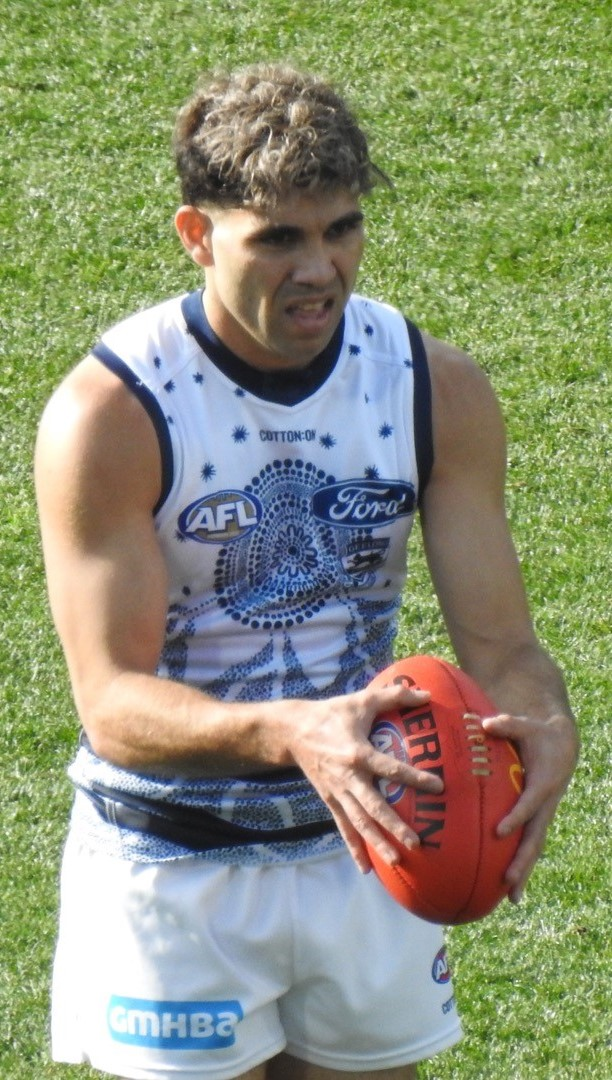
Tyson Stengle is from Adelaide

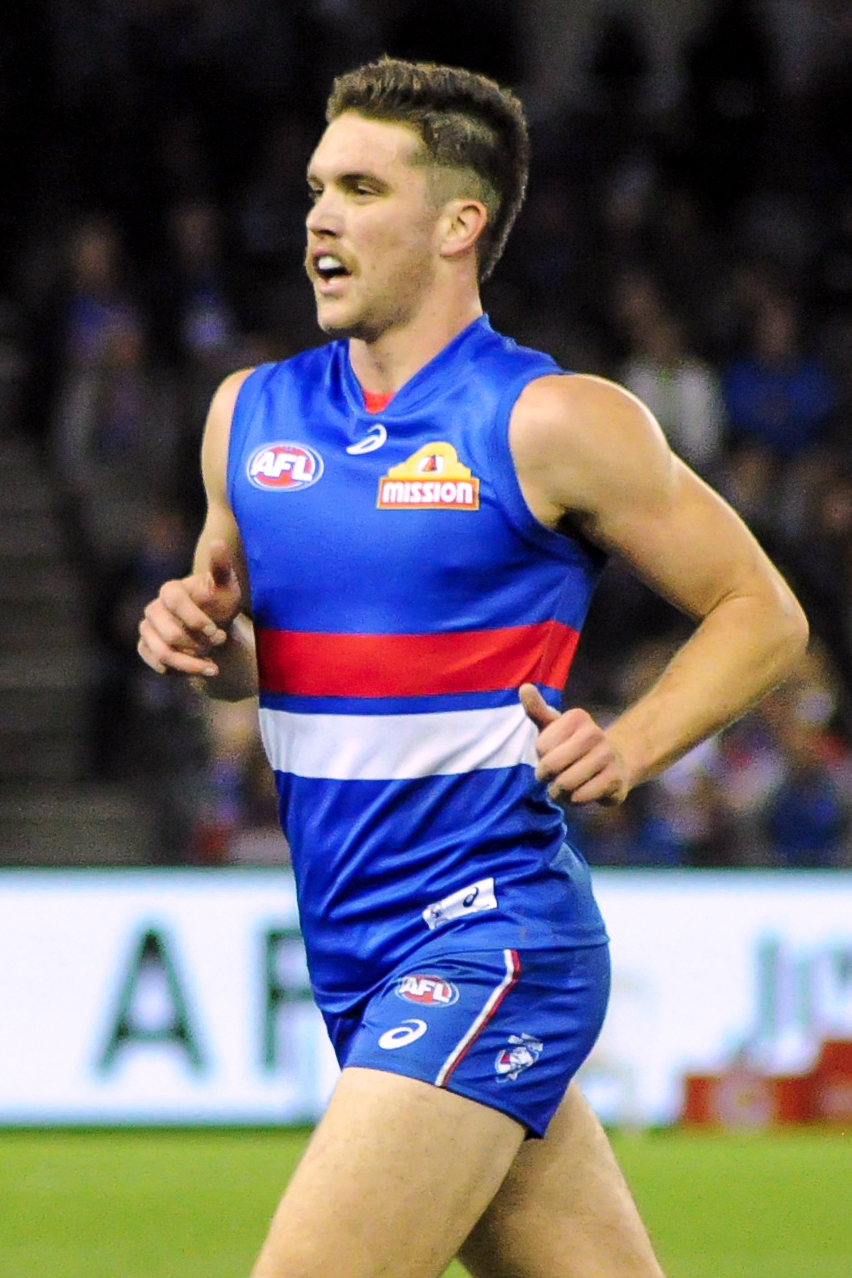
Bailey Williams is from Adelaide

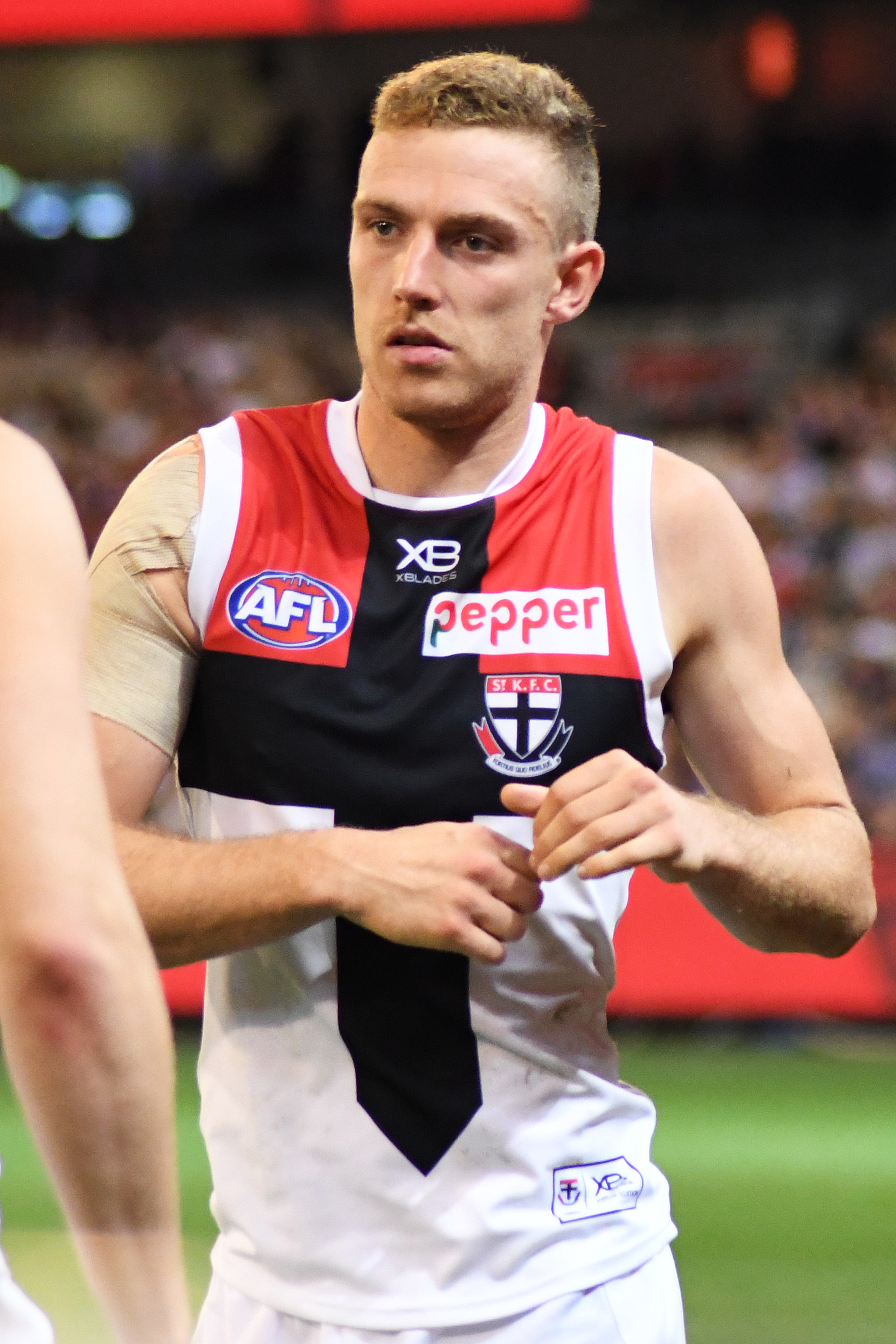
Callum Wilkie is from Adelaide

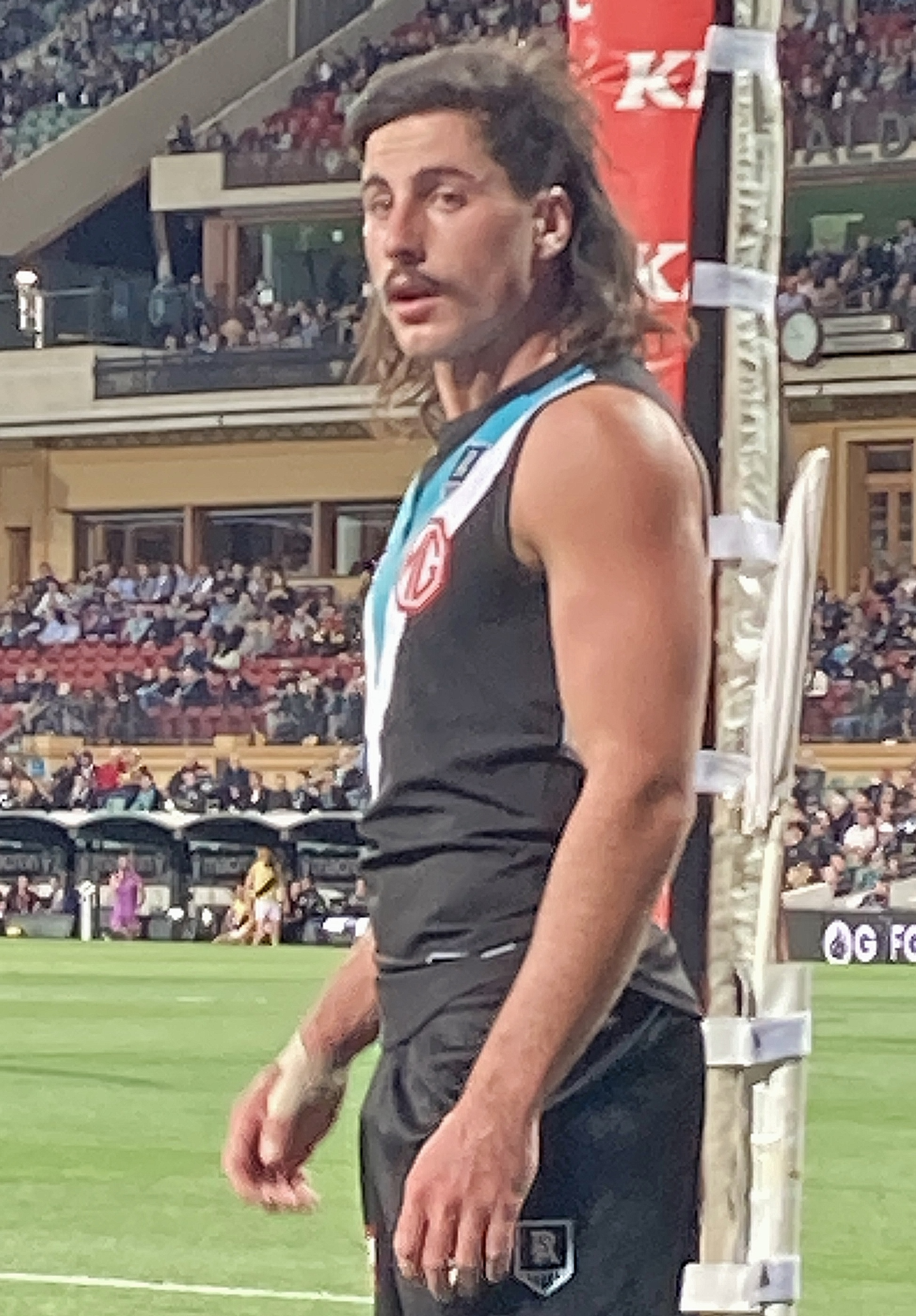
Lachie Jones is from Bute

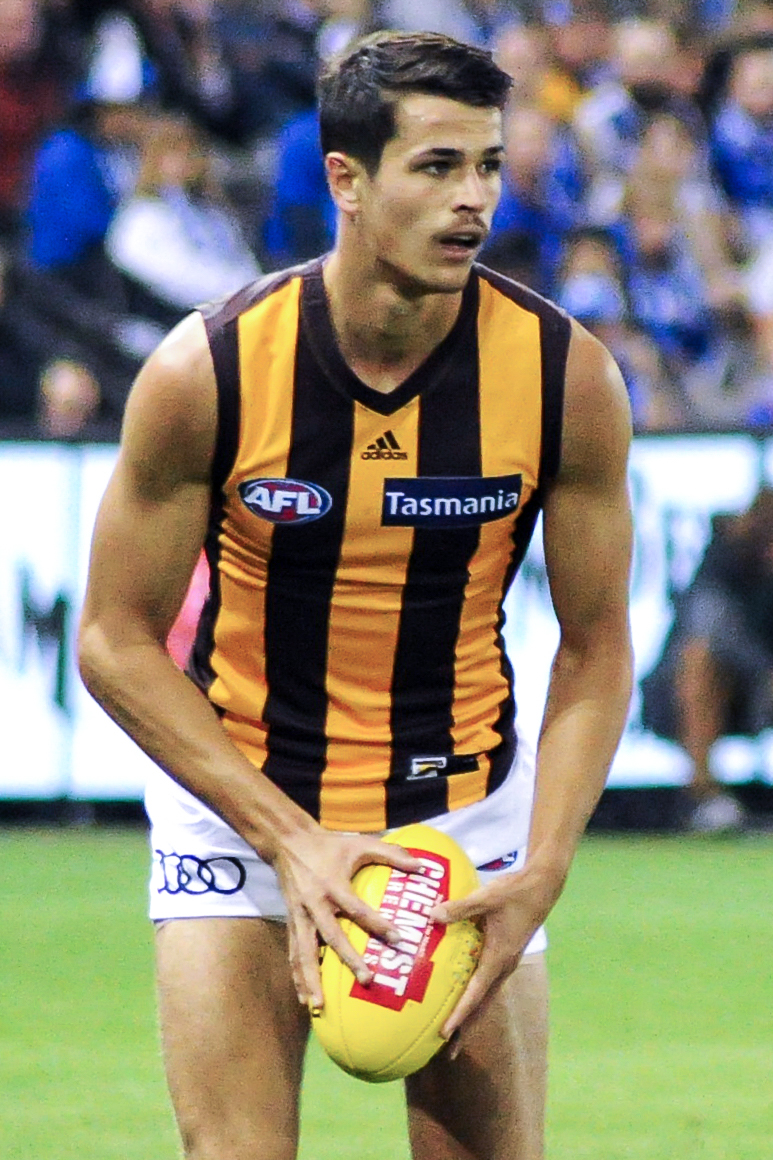
Ryan Burton is From Adelaide

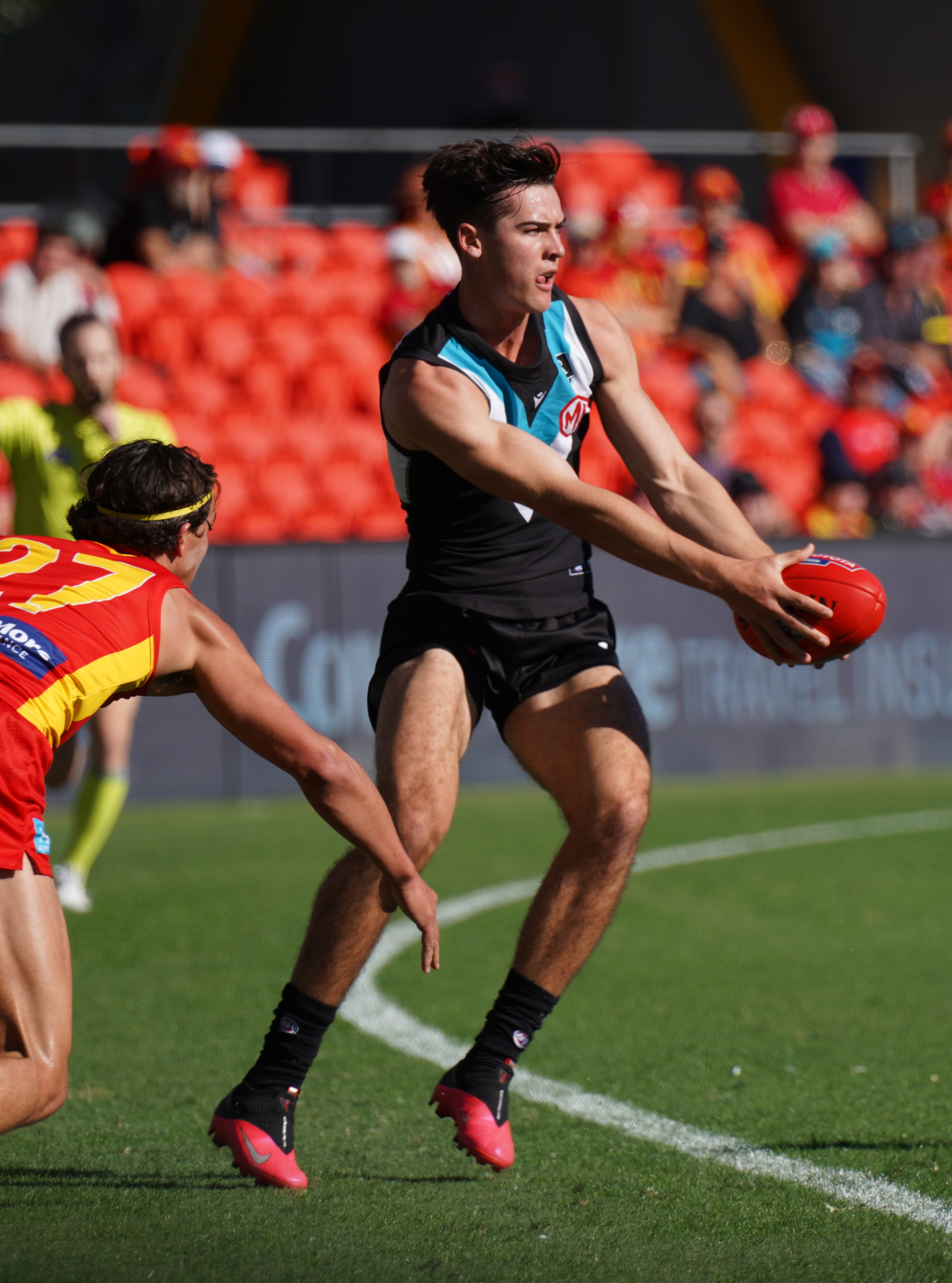
Connor Rozee is from Port Augusta

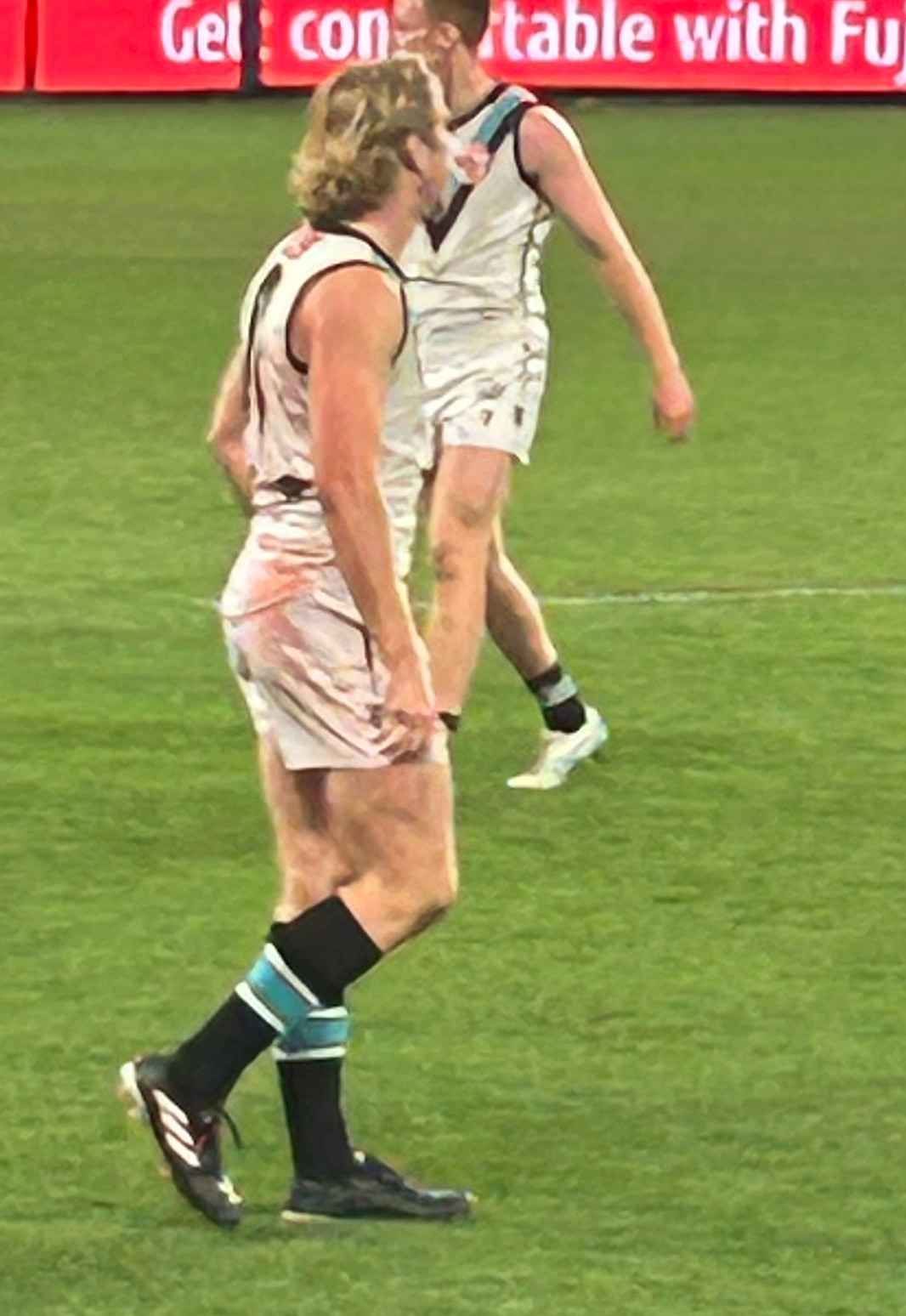
Jason Horne-Francis is from Adelaide

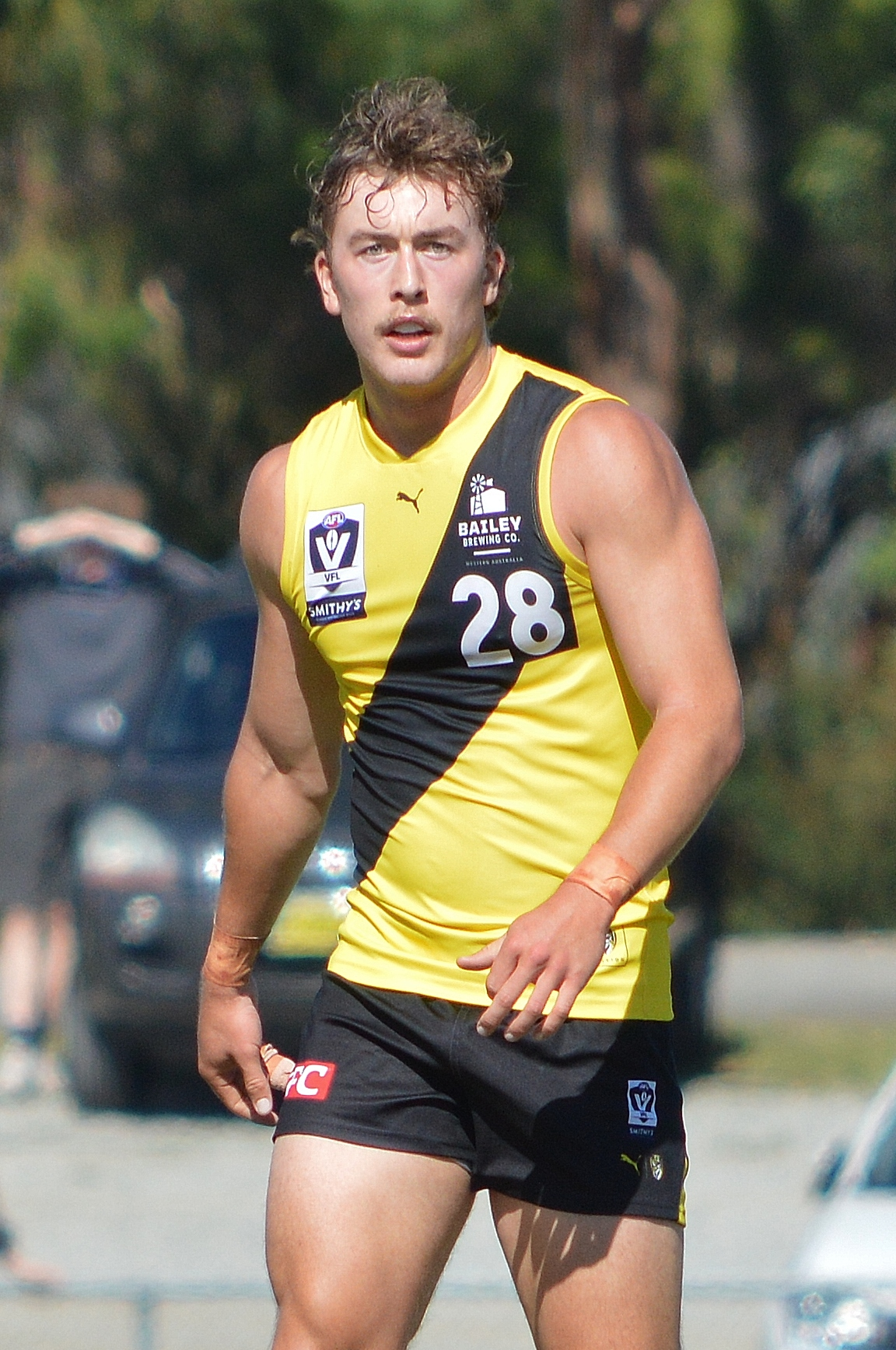
Kane McAuliffe is from Adelaide

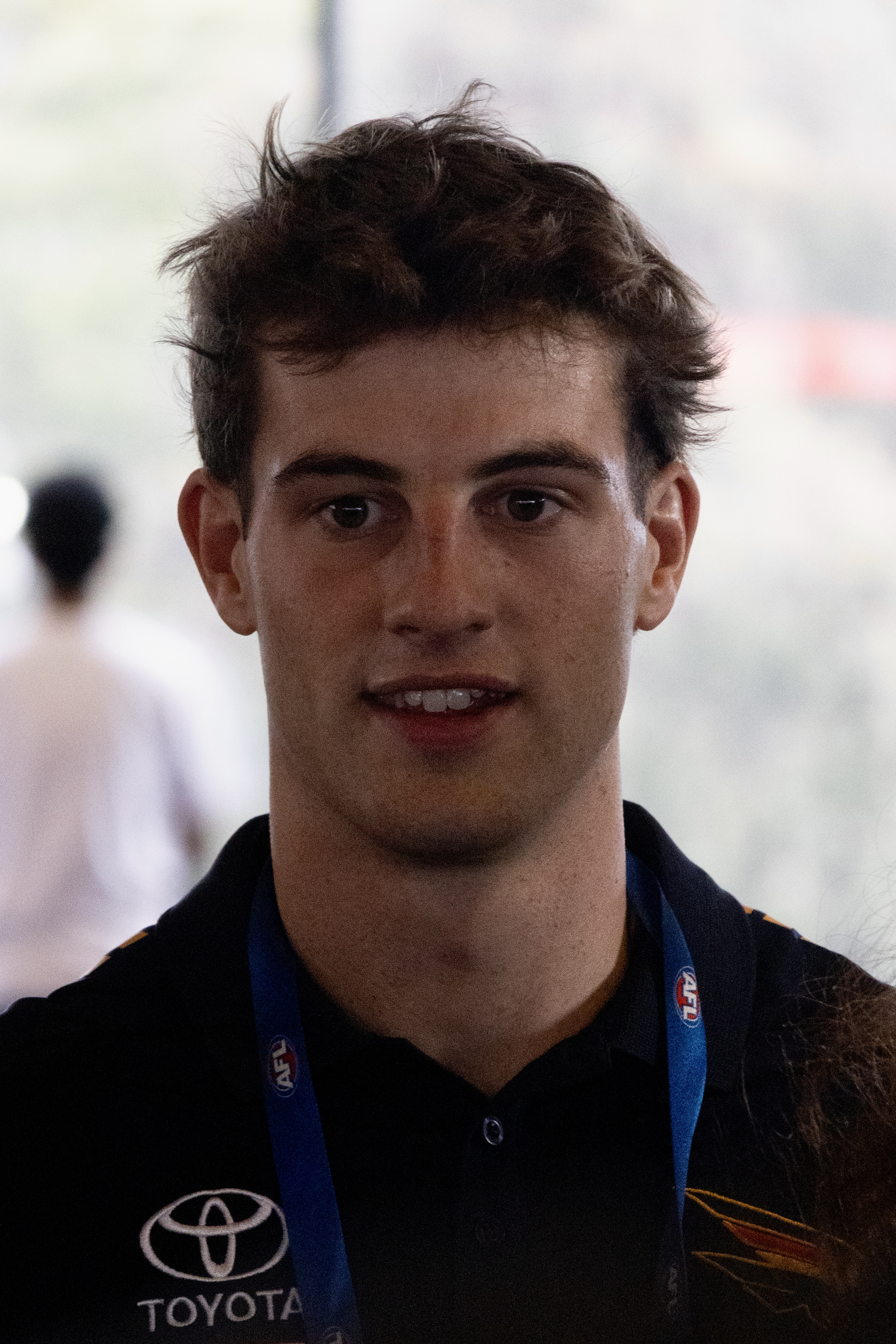
Billy Dowling is from Adelaide

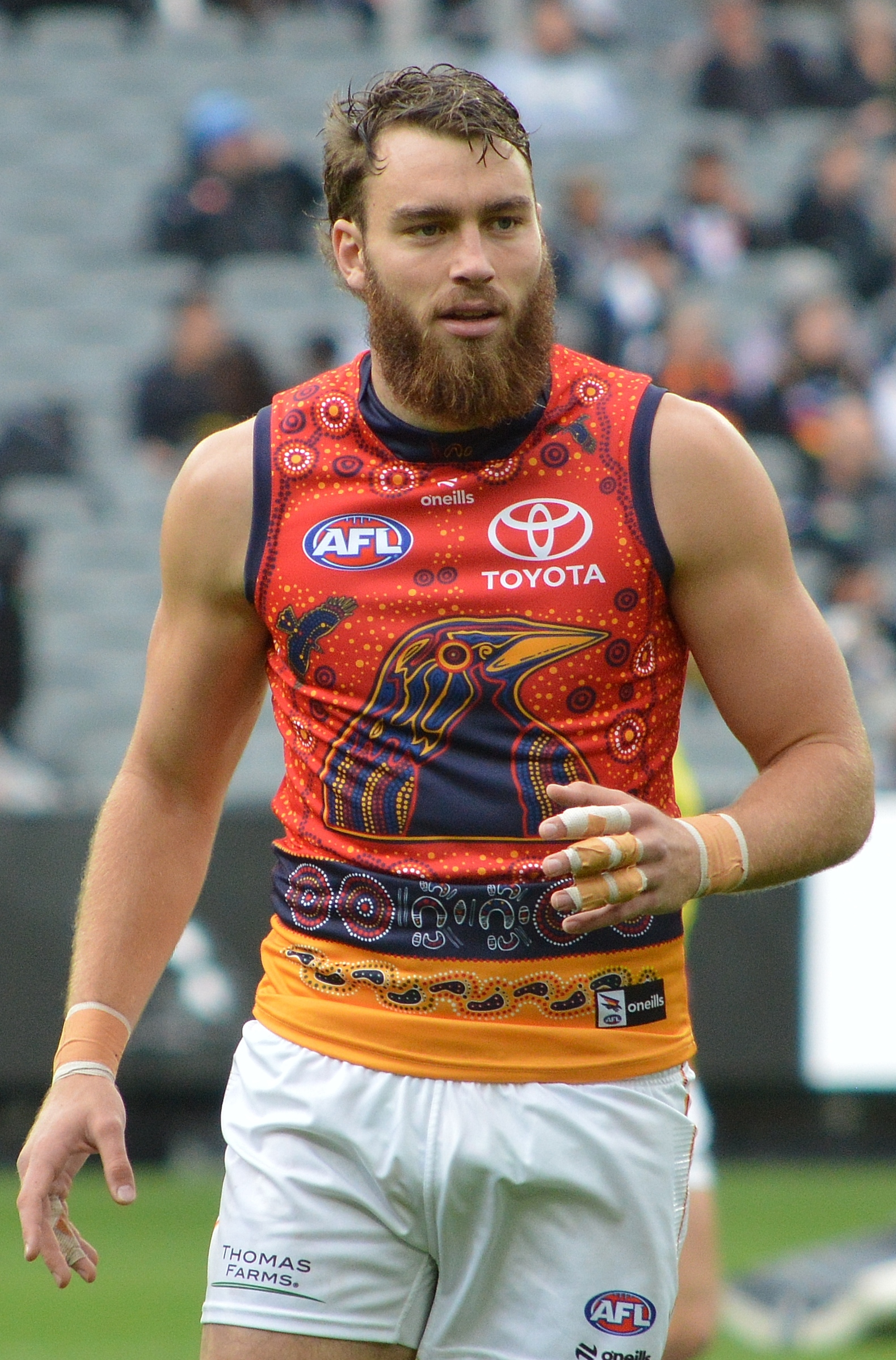
Riley Tilthorpe is from Adelaide

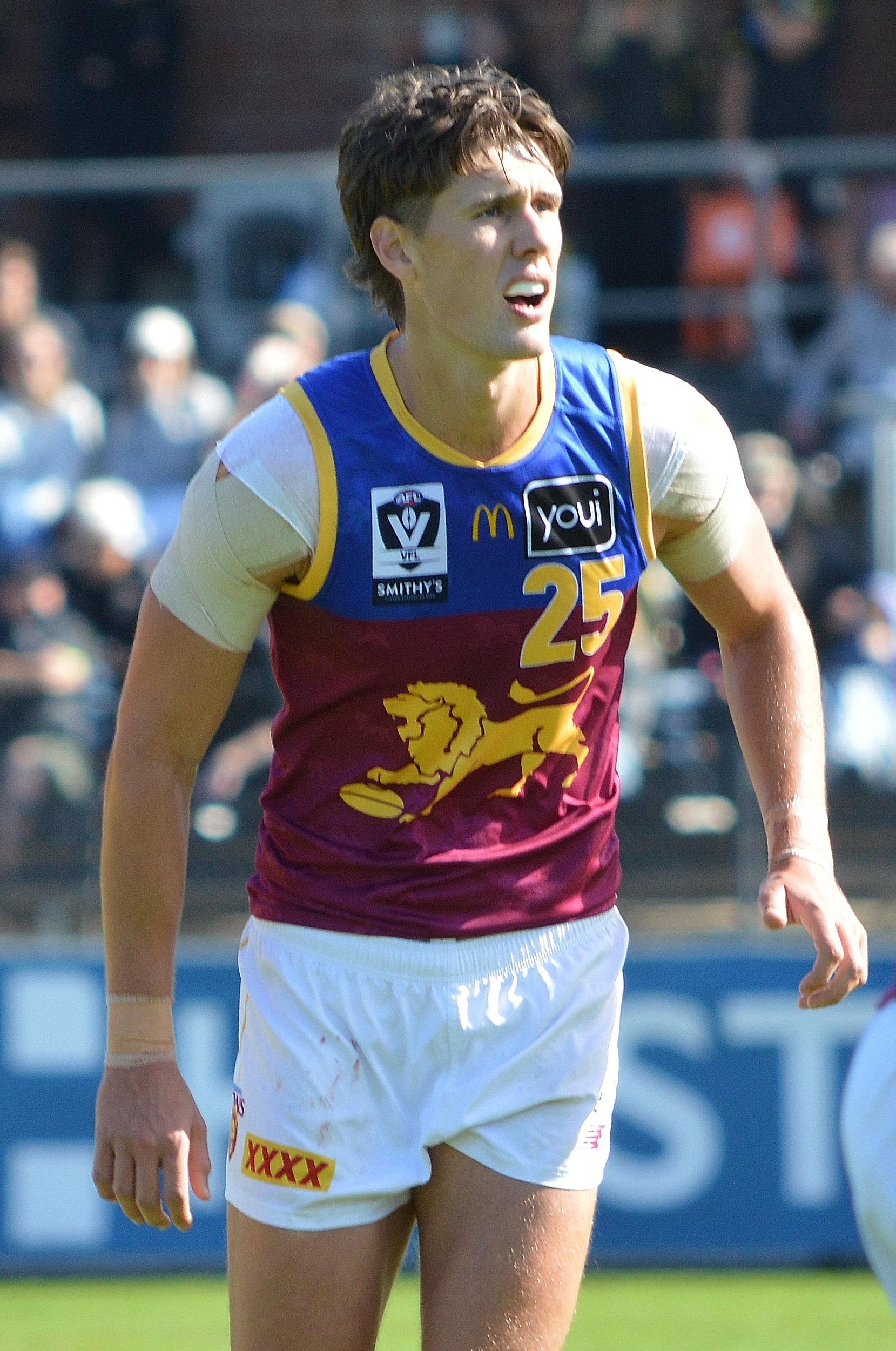
Henry Smith is from Adelaide

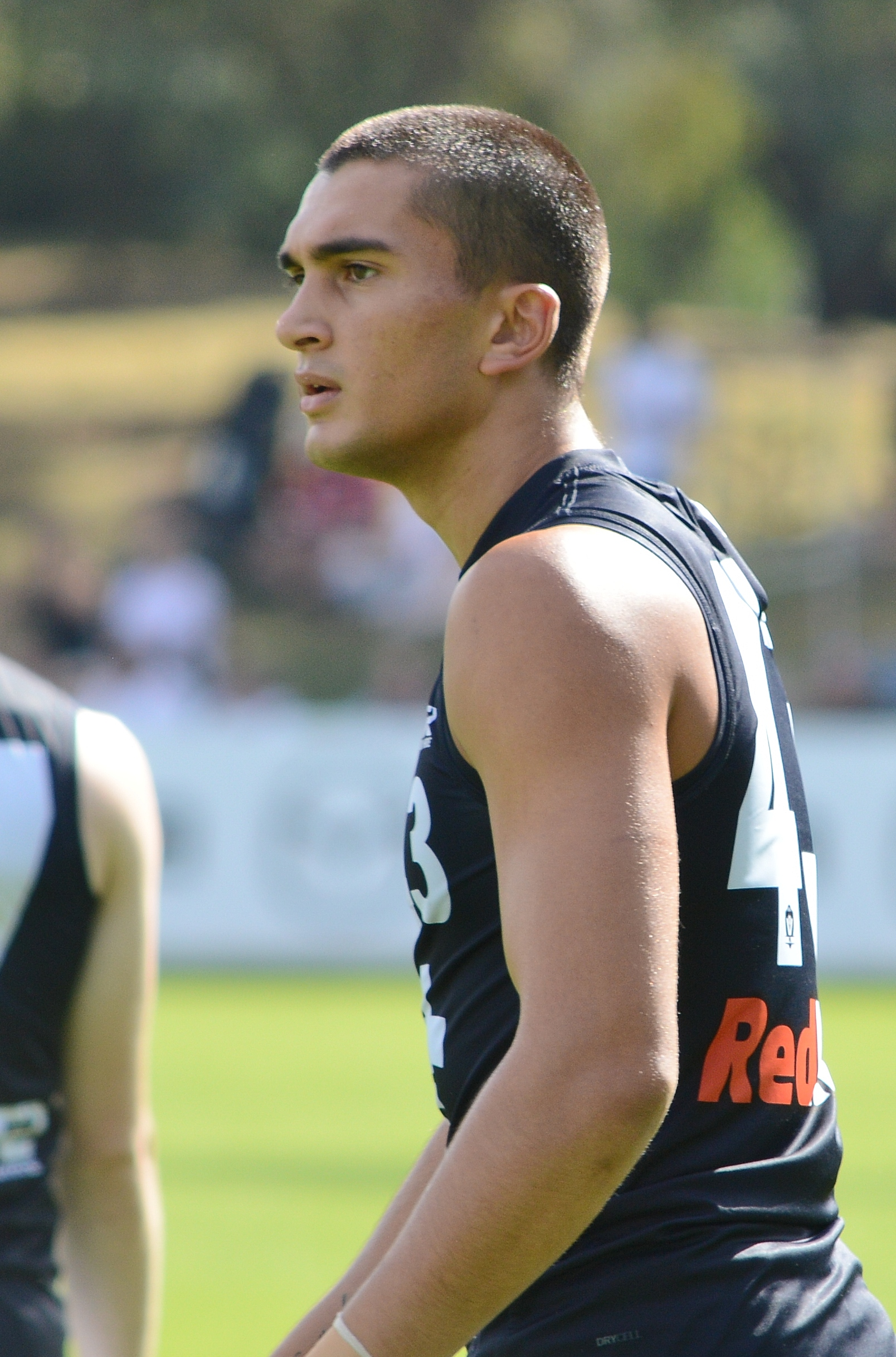
Ashton Moir is from Adelaide

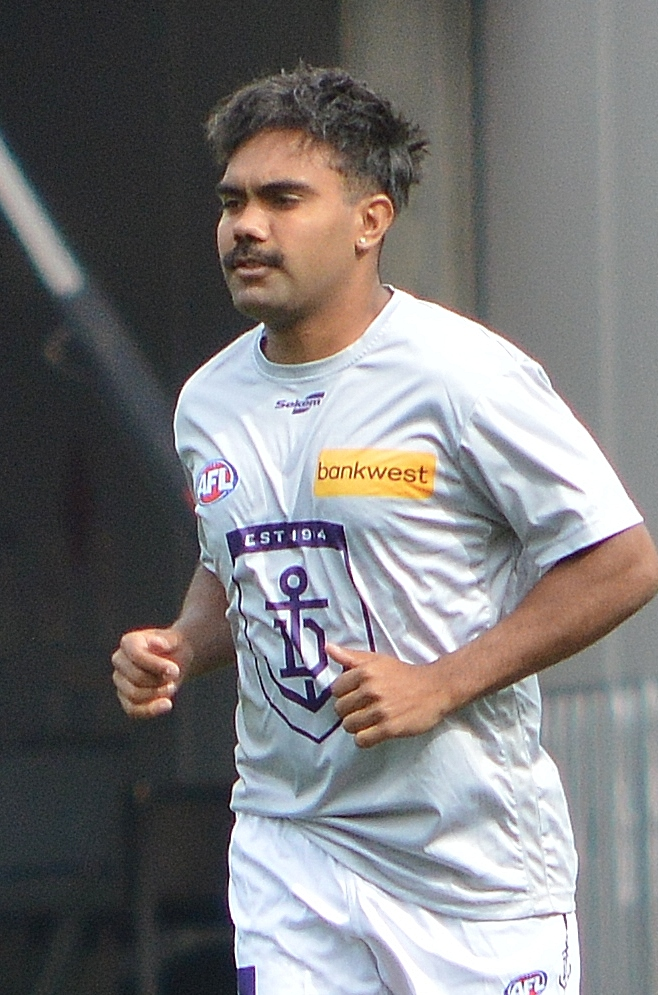
Isiah Dudley is from Port Lincoln

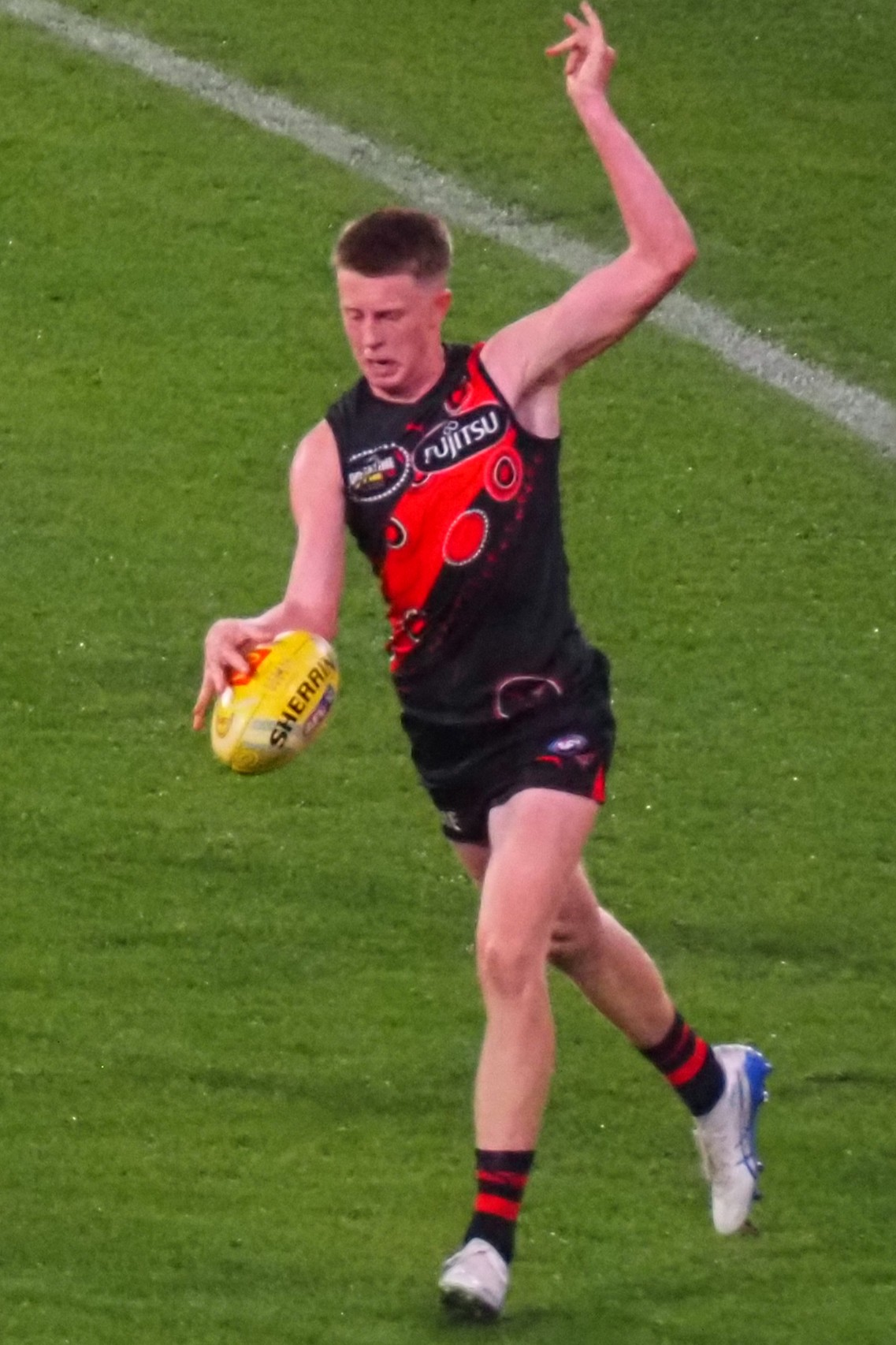
Angus Clarke is from Tantanoola

=== List of AFL players ===
Currently on an AFL senior list

Player	SA junior/senior club/s	Representative honours	AFL Draft	Selection	AFL Years	AFL Club/s	AFL Games	AFL (Goals)	Connections to South Australia, Notes & References
Jacob Newton	Norwood	U18 (2025)	2025 (mid-season)	(mid-season #9)	2025-	West Coast	2	1	Raised in Adelaide
Alex Dodson	Payneham NU JFC, Sturt		2024	#53	2025-	St Kilda	1	0	Raised in Adelaide
Charlie West	Woodville-West Torrens		2024	#50	2025-	Collingwood	1	1	Raised in Adelaide
Mani Liddy	Kersbrook, Sturt, Central District, Port Adelaide		2025 (mid season)	(Mid Season rookie #16)	2025-	Port Adelaide	9	1	Raised in Kersbrook
Hugh Jackson	Crystal Brook, Rostrevor College, North Adelaide, Port Adelaide		2021	#55	2025-	Port Adelaide	9	1	Raised in Crystal Brook
Isaiah Dudley	Central District		2024	PSS	2025-	Fremantle	16	15	Born in Port Lincoln, raised in Adelaide
Lucas Camporeale	Glenelg		2024	#54	2025-	Carlton	2	0	Recruited from Adelaide
Sid Draper	Willunga, South Adelaide, Adelaide		2024	#4	2025-	Adelaide	9	3	Born and raised in Adelaide
Liam Fawcett	Pooraka, Central District		2023	#43	2025-	Richmond	1	1	Raised in Adelaide
Isaac Keeler	South Augusta, North Adelaide		2022	#44	2025-	St Kilda	11	10	Raised in Port Augusta (Kokatha, Mirning)
Tom Cochrane	Port District, Central District, Port Adelaide		2024	#13	2025-	Port Adelaide	3	2	Raised in Adelaide
Harry Lemmey	Flagstaff Hill, South Adelaide		2022	#47	2024-	Carlton	-	-	Raised in Adelaide
Ashton Moir	Edwardstown, Glenelg		2023	#29	2024-	Carlton	3	2	Raised in Adelaide
Henry Smith	Blackwood, Woodville-West Torrens		2020	#48	2024-	Brisbane Lions	1	0	Raised in Adelaide
Logan Evans	Norwood, Port Adelaide		2021	Rookie (#12)	2024-	Port Adelaide	1	0	Raised in Adelaide
Billy Dowling	North Adelaide, Walkerville, Adelaide		2022	#43	2024-	Adelaide	1	0	Born and raised in Adelaide
Loch Rawlinson	Mitcham, Sturt	U18 (2023)	2023	Rookie	2024-	West Coast	1	0	Raised in Adelaide
Kane McAuliffe	Central Augusta, North Adelaide	U18 (2023)	2023	#40	2024-	Richmond	1	0	Raised in Port Augusta
Max Michalanney	Norwood, Adelaide		2022	#17	2023-	Adelaide	22	0	Raised in Adelaide
Mattaes Phillipou	PHOS Camden, Woodville-West Torrens		2022	#10	2023-	St Kilda	24	13	Raised in Adelaide
Tom Emmett	Payneham Norwood Union, Sturt		2022	#41	2023-2024	Fremantle	15	11	Born and raised in Adelaide
Jakob Ryan	Brighton Districts & Old Scholars, Sacred Heart College, Torrens University, Glenelg		2022	#28	2023-	Collingwood	1	0	Raised in Adelaide
James Borlase	Unley, Sturt, Port Adelaide		2020 (rookie)		2023-	Port Adelaide	2	0	Raised in Adelaide
Matthew Coulthard	Port Noarlunga, Glenelg		2023	#3	2023-	Richmond	4	1	Raised in Port Noarlunga
Jacob Bauer	North Adelaide		2022 (rookie)	Rookie (#10)	2023-	Richmond	3	3	Recruited from Adelaide
Harry Barnett	Goodwood, West Adelaide		2022	#23	2023-	West Coast	1	0	Raised in Adelaide
Jason Horne-Francis	Christies Beach, South Adelaide, Port Adelaide	U16 (c), U19 (2021 c)	2021	#1	2022-	North Melbourne, Port Adelaide	42	20	Raised in Adelaide
Nasiah Wanganeen-Milera	Glenelg	U18 (2021)	2022	#11	2022-	St Kilda	41	5	Raised in Adelaide
Kaine Baldwin	Glenelg	U16 (2018 c)	2021	Supplemental	2022-2024	Essendon	8	2	Born and raised in Adelaide
Jase Burgoyne	Port District, Henley High School, Woodville-West Torrens, Port Adelaide		2021	#60	2022-	Port Adelaide	16	2	Raised in Adelaide
Jacob Wehr	Balaklava, Woodville-West Torrens		2020	#59	2022-	Greater Western Sydney	25	4	Raised in Adelaide
Oscar Adams	Glenelg		2021	#51	2022-	St Kilda, Gold Coast	8	0	Recruited from Adelaide
Jye Menzie	South Adelaide		2022	Mid-season Rookie (#15)	2022-	Essendon	24	25	Recruited from Adelaide
Tex Wanganeen	Sturt			Rookie	2022-2024	Essendon	5	1	Raised in Adelaide
Jack Hayes	Woodville-West Torrens		2022	Preseason Supplemental	2022-2024	St Kilda	5	6	Raised in Adelaide
Harvey Harrison	Golden Grove, Tyndale Christian College, North Adelaide		2021	#52	2022-	Collingwood	4	3	Raised in Adelaide
Matty Roberts	Langhorne Creek, St Peter's College, South Adelaide		2021	#34	2022-	Sydney	12	2	Raised in Adelaide
Kaine Baldwin	Glenelg	U16	2021	Supplementary	2022-	Collingwood	8	2	Recruited from Adelaide
Josh Carmichael	West Adelaide		2022	Mid-season (#9)	2022-2024	Collingwood	8	4	Recruited from Adelaide
Leek Aleer	Angle Vale. Central District		2021	#15	2022-	Greater Western Sydney	6	0	Recruited from Adelaide
Alastair Lord	Norwood		2021	#46	2022-	Essendon	1	0	Recruited from Adelaide
Luke Pedlar	Kingston, Glenelg, Adelaide		2020	#11	2021-	Adelaide	26	26	Born in Mount Gambier, raised in Kingston SE and Adelaide
Elijah Hollands	-		2020	#7	2021-	Gold Coast, Carlton	14	8	Born and raised in Adelaide
Riley Thilthorpe	Goodwood, West Adelaide, Adelaide		2020	#2	2021-	Adelaide	46	44	Raised in Adelaide
Beau McCreery	Cove, South Adelaide		2020	#44	2021-	Collingwood	62	44	Raised in Adelaide
Lachie Jones	Woodville-West Torrens		2020	#16	2021-	Port Adelaide	21	5	Raised in Bute
Jed McEntee	Mitcham, Sturt		2021 (mid-season)	#13	2021-	Port Adelaide	35	21	Raised in Adelaide
Tom Powell	Concordia, Unley Jets, Scotch College, Sturt	U18 (2020)	2020	#13	2021-	North Melbourne	47	18	Raised in Adelaide
Caleb Poulter	Ardrossan, Woodville-West Torrens		2020	#30	2021-	Collingwood, Western Bulldogs	19	4	Raised in Ardrossan
Ash Johnson	Scotch Old Colegians, Sturt		2020	Mid-season (#3)	2021-	Collingwood	26	36	Recruited from Adelaide
Brayden Cook	Happy Valley, Adelaide		2020	#25	2021-2023	Adelaide	12	3	Born in Mount Barker, raised in Adelaide
Jack Saunders	Walkerville, Unley, Norwood		2021 (Rookie)	Rookie (#4)	2021-2022	Hawthorn	1	1	Raised in and recruited from Adelaide
Michael Frederick	Woodville-West Torrens		2019	#61	2020-	Fremantle	59	64	Born and raised in Adelaide
Will Day	PHOS Camden, Glenelg Junior, West Adelaide	U18 (2019)	2019	#13	2020-	Hawthorn	54	10	Raised in Adelaide
Kysaiah Pickett	Port District, Woodville-West Torrens		2019	#12	2020-	Melbourne	89	133	Recruited from South Australia
Connor Budarick	-		2019	#16	2020-	Gold Coast	26	1	Born and raised in Robe
Brad Close	North Gambier, Glenelg		2019	#14	2020-	Geelong	76	64	Born and raised in Mount Gambier
Sam Draper	South Adelaide		2017	#1	2020-	Essendon	57	25	Born and raised in Adelaide
Harry Schoenberg	Woodville-West Torrens, Adelaide		2019	#24	2020-	Adelaide	61	22	Born in Marrabel, raised in Adelaide
Connor Rozee	South Augusta, North Adelaide, Port Adelaide		2018	#5	2019-	Port Adelaide	106	98	Born and raised in Port Augusta
Callum Wilkie	Walkerville, North Adelaide		2019 Rookie Draft	Rookie (#3)	2019-	St Kilda	107	1	Raised in Adelaide
John Noble	North Adelaide		2019	Mid-season (#14)	2019-	Collingwood	93	7	Raised in Adelaide
Izak Rankine	Edwardstown, Flinders Park, West Adelaide, Adelaide		2018	#3	2019-	Gold Coast, Adelaide	68	93	Born and raised in Adelaide
Jack Lukosius	Henley, Woodville-West Torrens		2018	#2	2019-	Gold Coast	96	59	Born and raised in Adelaide
Brandon Zerk-Thatcher	Sturt, Port Adelaide		2017	#66	2019-	Essendon, Port Adelaide	51	0	Raised in Adelaide
Kade Chandler	Western United Tigers, Norwood		2019	#15	2019-	Melbourne	39	31	Born and raised in Charra
Tom Sparrow	Bridgewater, South Adelaide				2019-	Melbourne	77	29	Raised in Adelaide
Shane McAdam	Sturt, Adelaide				2019-	Melbourne	50	72	Raised in and recruited from Adelaide
Jordon Sweet	Tea Tree Gully, North Adelaide, Port Adelaide		2019	Rookie (#23)	2019-	Western Bulldogs, Port Adelaide	11	2	Raised in and recruited from Adelaide
Chris Burgess	Flinders Park, Adelaide		2018	Pre-draft selection	2019-	Gold Coast, Adelaide	44	21	Raised in Adelaide
Nathan Kreuger	Victor Harbour, South Adelaide				2019-2024	Geelong, Collingwood	15	7	Raised in Victor Harbour
Darcy Fogarty	Rostrevor College, Glenelg		2017	#12	2018-	Adelaide	79	117	Raised in Lucindale and Adelaide
Callum Coleman-Jones	Blackwood, Sturt	U15 (2014), U16 (2015), U18 (2017 c)	2017	#20	2018-	Richmond, North Melbourne	31	20	Raised in Adelaide
Charlie Ballard	Mitcham, Sturt	U18 (2017)	2017	#42	2018-	Gold Coast	110	2	Raised in Adelaide
Harrison Petty	Wudinna United, Norwood		2017	#37	2018-	Melbourne	65	20	Born and raised in Wudinna
Lewis Young	Sturt		2016	#49	2017-	Western Bulldogs, Carlton	58	2	Raised in Adelaide
Will Hayward	North Adelaide		2016	#21	2017-	Sydney	148	181	Raised in Adelaide
Brennan Cox	Woodville-West Torrens		2016	#41	2017-	Fremantle	103	31	Raised in Adelaide
Peter Ladhams	Modbury, Norwood, Port Adelaide		2017	#9	2017-	Port Adelaide, Sydney	50	25	Raised in Adelaide
Mitch Hinge	Glenelg		2017	#20	2017-	Brisbane Lions, Adelaide	43	5	Raised in Adelaide
Tyson Stengle	Portland, Port Adelaide, Woodville-West Torrens, Adelaide,	U18 (2016)	2016	#6	2017-	Richmond, Adelaide, Geelong	73	122	Raised in Adelaide
Willie Rioli	Glenelg, Port Adelaide		2016	#52	2017-2025	West Coast, Port Adelaide	109	151	Recruited from Adelaide
Toby Pink	Glenelg		2017 (rookie)	Rookie (#54)	2017-2024	Sydney, North Melbourne	15	7	Raised in Adelaide
Ryan Burton	PHOS Cambden, Sacred Heart College, North Adelaide, Port Adelaide	U18 (2014)	2015	#19	2016-	Hawthorn, Port Adelaide	139	21	Raised in and recruited from Adelaide
Riley Bonner	Goodwood, West Adelaide, Port Adelaide		2015	#37	2016-2024	Port Adelaide, St Kilda	113	15	Raised in and recruited from Adelaide
Will Snelling	Goodwood, West Adelaide, Port Adelaide		2016 Rookie	Rookie (#10)	2016-2023	Port Adelaide, Essendon	65	29	Raised in and recruited from Adelaide
Jordan Dawson	Sturt, Adelaide		2015	#56	2016-	Sydney, Adelaide	122	57	Born and raised in Kingston SE
Mason Redman	Glenelg, Adelaide	U18	2015	#30	2016-	Essendon	103	18	Born and raised in Millicent
Wayne Milera	Central District, Adelaide	U18	2015	#11	2016-	Adelaide	96	29	Raised in Adelaide
Bailey Williams	Brighton Secondary, Glenelg		2015	#48	2016-	Western Bulldogs	127	29	Raised in Adelaide
Aaron Francis	West Adelaide		2015	#6	2016-	Essendon, Sydney	74	13	Raised in Adelaide
Oleg Markov	Gepps Cross, North Adelaide	U18	2015	#50	2016-2024	Richmond, Gold Coast, Collingwood	86	7	Raised in Adelaide
Josh Schache	-		2015	#2	2016-2024	Brisbane Lions, Western Bulldogs, Melbourne	76	79	Born in Adelaide
George Hewett	North Adelaide		2013	#32	2015-	Sydney, Carlton	156	39	Raised in Adelaide
Alex Neal-Bullen	Mitchell Park, Glenelg		2014	#40	2015-	Melbourne	159	112	Raised in Adelaide
Caleb Daniel	Edwardston, South Adelaide		2014	#46	2015-	Western Bulldogs	175	47	Raised in Adelaide
Sam Durdin	West Adelaide, Glenelg		2014	#16	2015-2024	North Melbourne, Carlton	24	1	Raised in Adelaide
Trent Dumont	Norwood, Port Adelaide		2013	#307	2014-	North Melbourne, Port Adelaide	121	28	Raised in Adelaide
James Aish	Norwood, Glenelg		2013	#7	2014-2025	Brisbane Lions, Collingwood, Fremantle	186	33	Raised in Adelaide
Sean Lemmens	Salisbury, Port Adelaide		2013	#27	2014-2025	Gold Coast	148	25	Raised in Adelaide
Orazio Fantasia	Payneham Norwood Union, Norwood, Port Adelaide		2013	#55	2014-	Essendon, Port Adelaide, Carlton	100	141	Born and raised in Adelaide
Rory Laird	Kenilworth, West Adelaide, Adelaide		2011	Rookie (#5)	2013-	Adelaide	228	29	Born in South Australia, raised in Adelaide
Jimmy Toumpas	Woodville-West Torrens, Port Adelaide	U18 (2012c)	2012	#4	2013-2018	Port Adelaide	37	7	Raised in Adelaide
Brodie Grundy	Sturt		2012	#18	2013-	Collingwood, Melbourne, Sydney	204	71	Born and raised in Adelaide
Chad Wingard	Imperial, Sturt, Port Adelaide		2011	#6	2012-2024	Port Adelaide, Hawthorn	218	300	Born and raised in Murray Bridge
Lachie Neale	Kybybolite, St Peters College, Glenelg	U18 (2011)	2011	#58	2012-	Fremantle, Brisbane Lions	250	116	Raised in Kybybolite
Lincoln McCarthy	Bordertown, Glenelg		2011	#66	2012-	Geelong, Brisbane Lions	140	154	Raised in Bordertown
Brodie Smith	West Lakes, Henley, Woodville-West Torrens, Adelaide		2010	#14	2011-2025	Adelaide	273	74	Raised in Adelaide
Tom Jonas	Rostrevor College, Norwood, Port Adelaide		2011	#16	2011-2023	Port Adelaide	215	2	Raised in Adelaide
Scott Lycett	Thevenard, Port Adelaide		2010	#29	2011-2023	Gold Coast	146	61	Born in Ceduna, raised in Thevenard
Jared Polec	Woodville-West Torrens		2010	#5	2011-2022	Brisbane Lions, Port Adelaide. North Melbourne	148	75	Born and raised in Adelaide
Sam Day	Sturt	U18	2011	#3	2011-2025	Gold Coast, Brisbane Lions	168	120	Born and raised in Adelaide
Rhys Stanley	West Adelaide		2008	#47	2010-	St Kilda, Geelong	196	105	Born and raised in Berri and Adelaide
Jack Redden	Keith, Glenelg		2008	#25	2009-2022	Brisbane Lions, West Coast	263	80	Raised in Adelaide
Shane Edwards	Golden Grove, North Adelaide		2006	#26	2007-2022	Richmond	303	189	Born and raised in Adelaide
Shannon Hurn	Central District	U18 (2005)	2005	#13	2006-2023	West Coast	333	50	Born in Angaston and raised in Angaston and Nuriootpa
Eddie Betts	Mallee Park, Adelaide		2004	(pre-season) #3	2005-2021	Adelaide, Carlton	350	640	Raised in Port Lincoln (Wirangu, Kokatha)
Shaun Burgoyne	Mallee Park, Port Adelaide		2000	#12	2001-2021	Port Adelaide, Hawthorn	407	302	Raised in Port Lincoln (Kokatha)
Matthew Pavlich	Sacred Heart College, Woodville-West Torrens		1999	#4	2000-2016	Fremantle	353	700	Born and raised in Adelaide
Adam Goodes			1997	#43	1999-2015	Sydney	372	464	Born and raised in Wallaroo (Adnyamathanha, Narungga)
Warren Tredrea	Port Adelaide		1996	Zone selection	1997-2010	Port Adelaide	255	549	Born in South Australia, raised in Adelaide
Michael O'Loughlin	Central District		1994	#40	1995-2009	Sydney	303	521	Born and raised in Adelaide (Kaurna, Ngarrindjeri)
Tony Modra	West Adelaide, Adelaide	1992-1997			1991-2001 (6 caps)	Adelaide, Fremantle	165	588	Born in McLaren Vale, raised in Christies Beach and Loxton
David Grenvold	Glenelg		1987	#45	1989-1996	Essendon	112	18	Born and raised in Bordertown
Tony Hall	Glenelg, Adelaide	1988, 1989, 1992, 1993			1988-1995	Hawthorn, Adelaide	217	278	Raised in Adelaide
Bruce Abernethy	Rosewater, Port Adelaide	10 caps			1982-1992	North Melbourne, Collingwood, Adelaide	112	39	Raised in Adelaide
Darryl Cowie	Gawler Central, Central District				1982-1987	St Kilda, Richmond	63	9	Raised in and recruited from Adelaide
Stephen Copping	Glenelg				1982-1984	Essendon	42	88	Raised in and recruited from Adelaide
Wayne Slattery	South Adelaide				1982	St Kilda	11	12	Raised in and recruited from Adelaide
Geoff Linke	South Adelaide		1981	#15	1982	St Kilda	2	3	Raised in and recruited from Adelaide
Craig Bradley	Port Adelaide				1981-2002	Carlton	375	247	Born and raised in Adelaide
Stephen Kernahan	Glenelg	1983–1996 (16 caps)			1981-1997	Carlton	251	738	Born and raised in Adelaide
Bert Renfrey	North Adelaide, Norwood, Sturt				1907	St Kilda	15	0	Born and raised in Adelaide
Harry Laxton					1904-1907	Essendon	44	3	Born in Aldgate
Alf Swift					1904	Essendon	7	2	Born in Port Elliot
Mick Pleass					1904	Essendon	132	45	Born in Kent Town
Dick McCabe					1897-1907	South Melbourne	148	18	Born in Farrell Flat

== Women's ==
=== Current player gallery ===
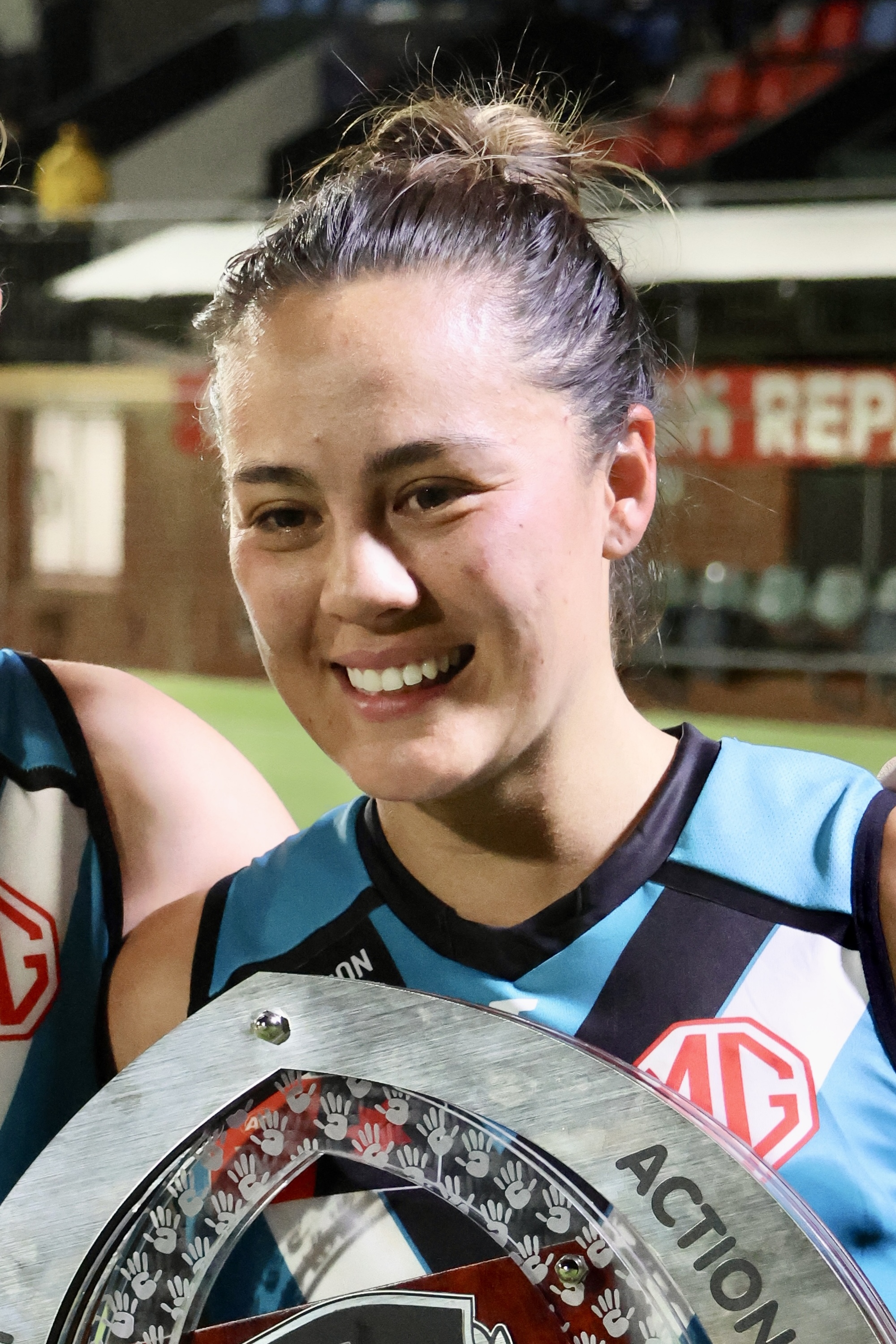
Justine Mules

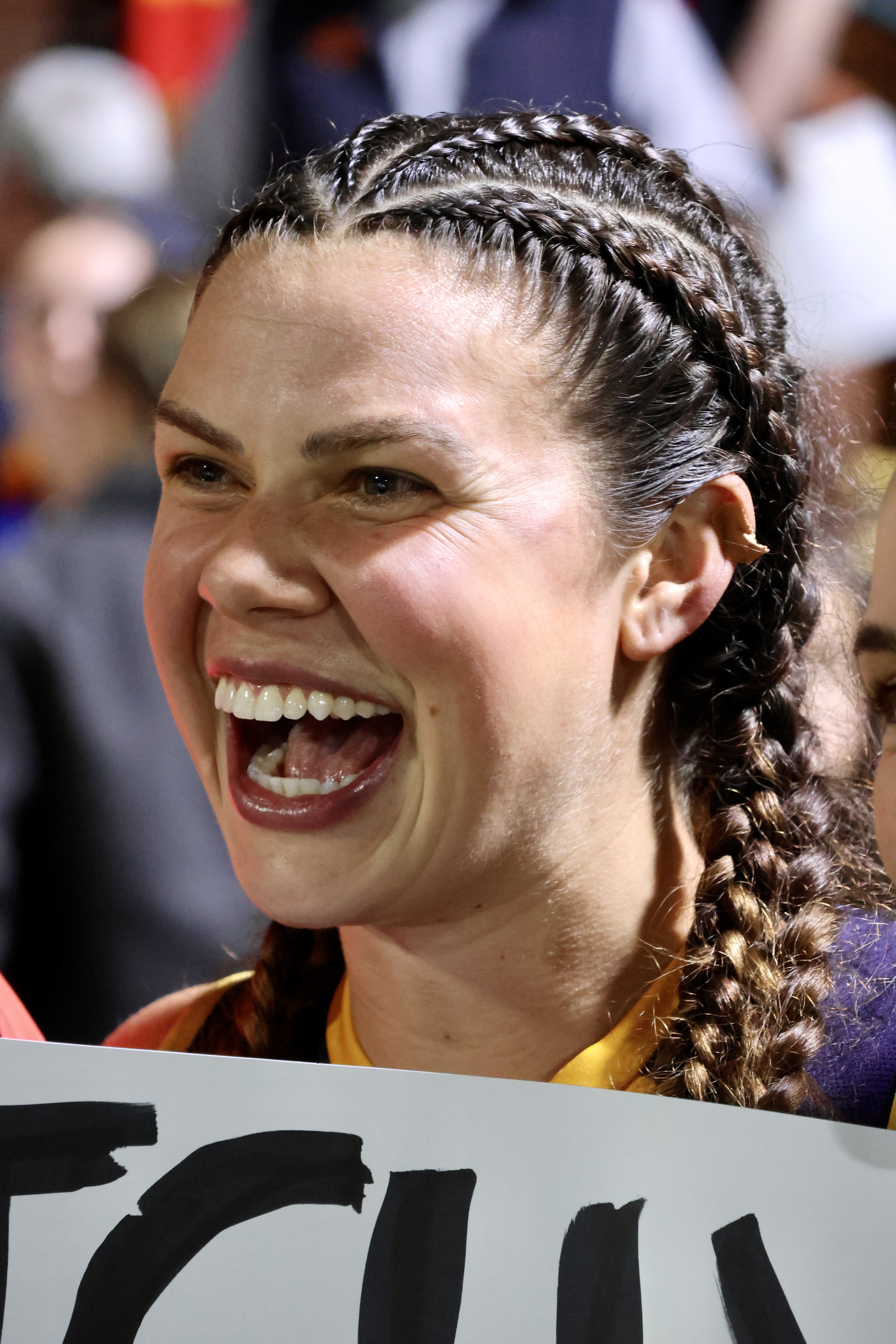
Anne Hatchard

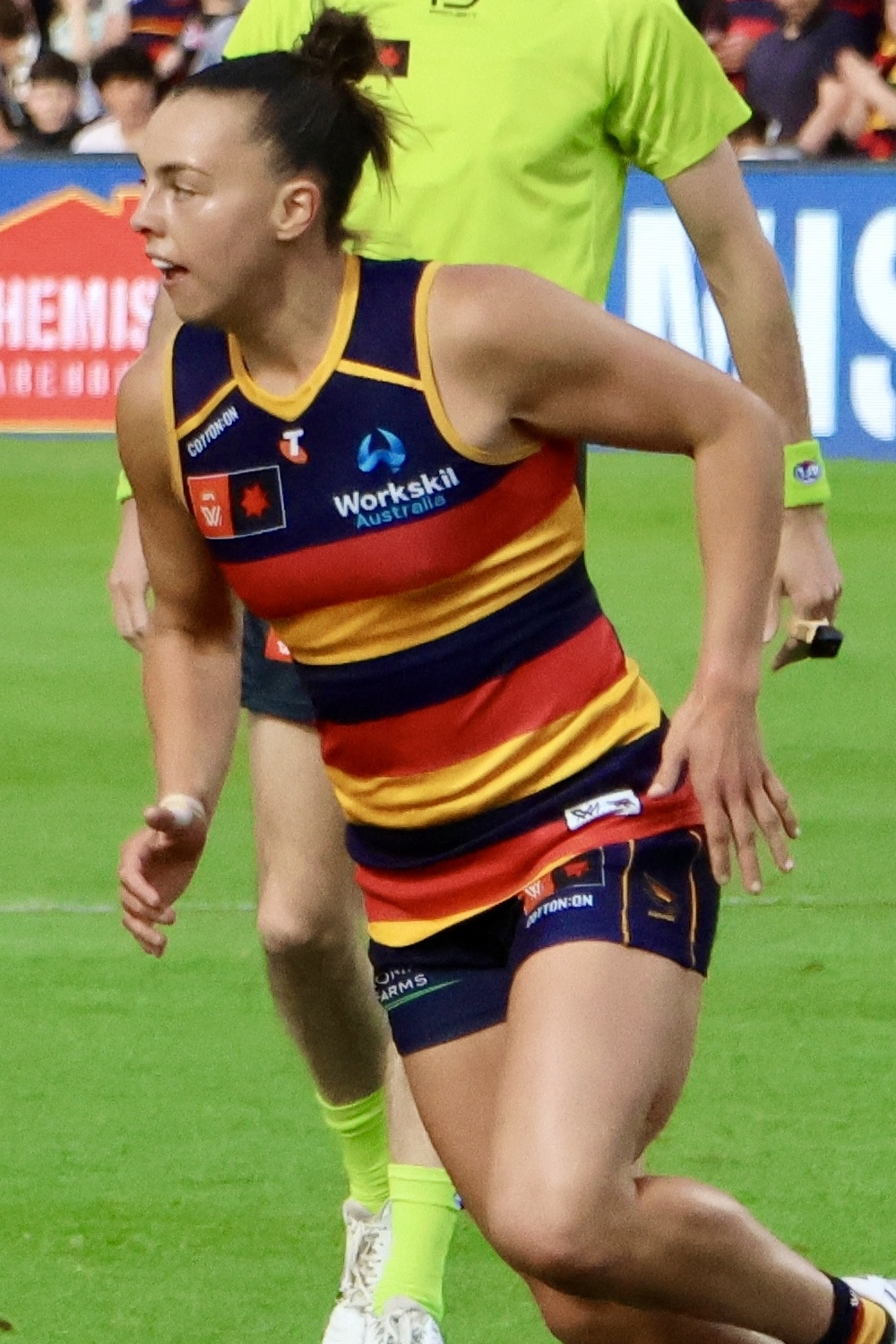
Ebony Marinoff

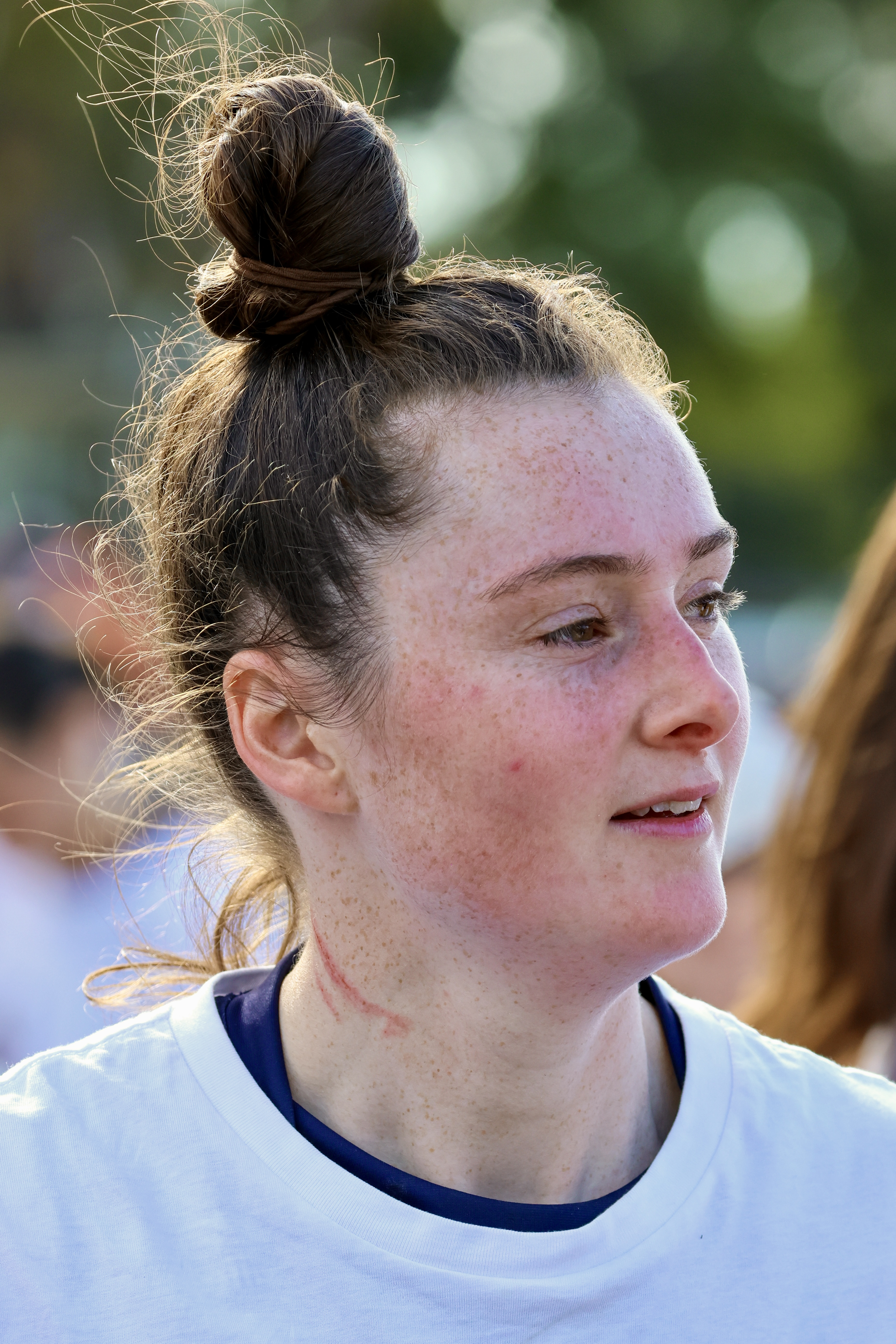
Sarah Allan

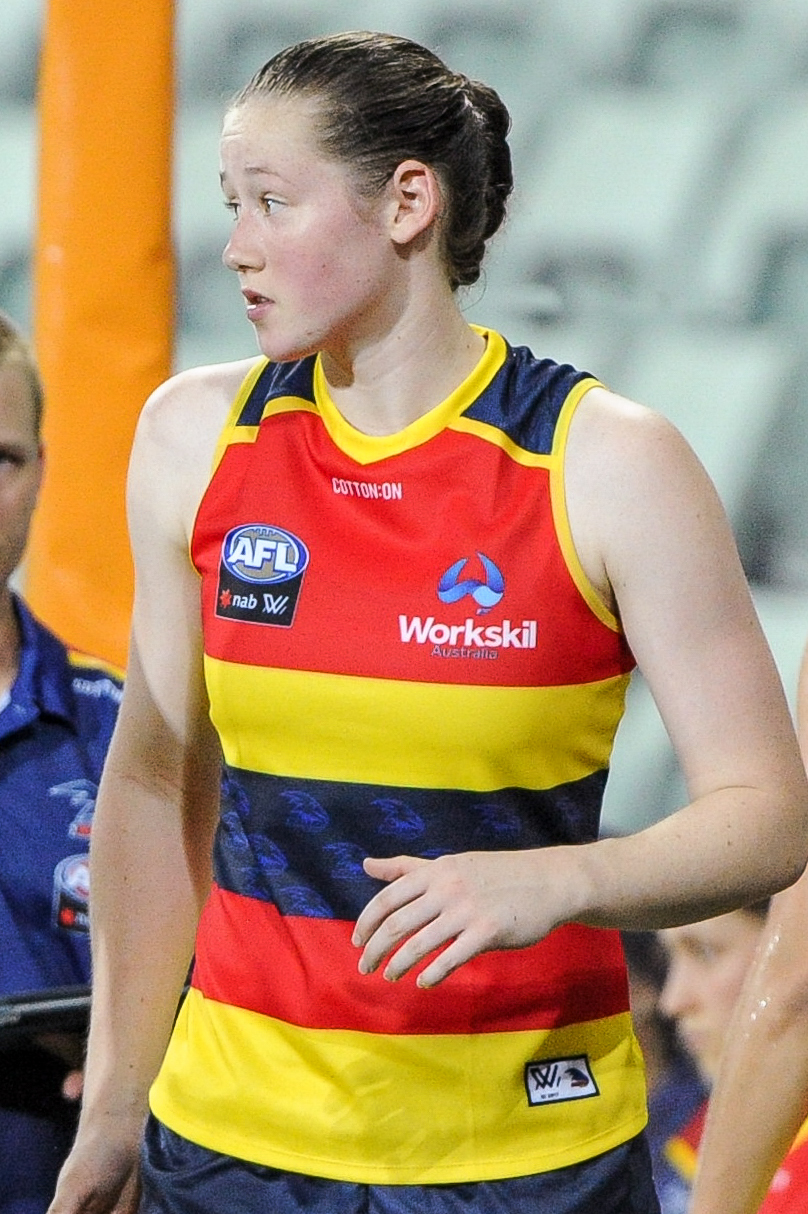
Jess Allan

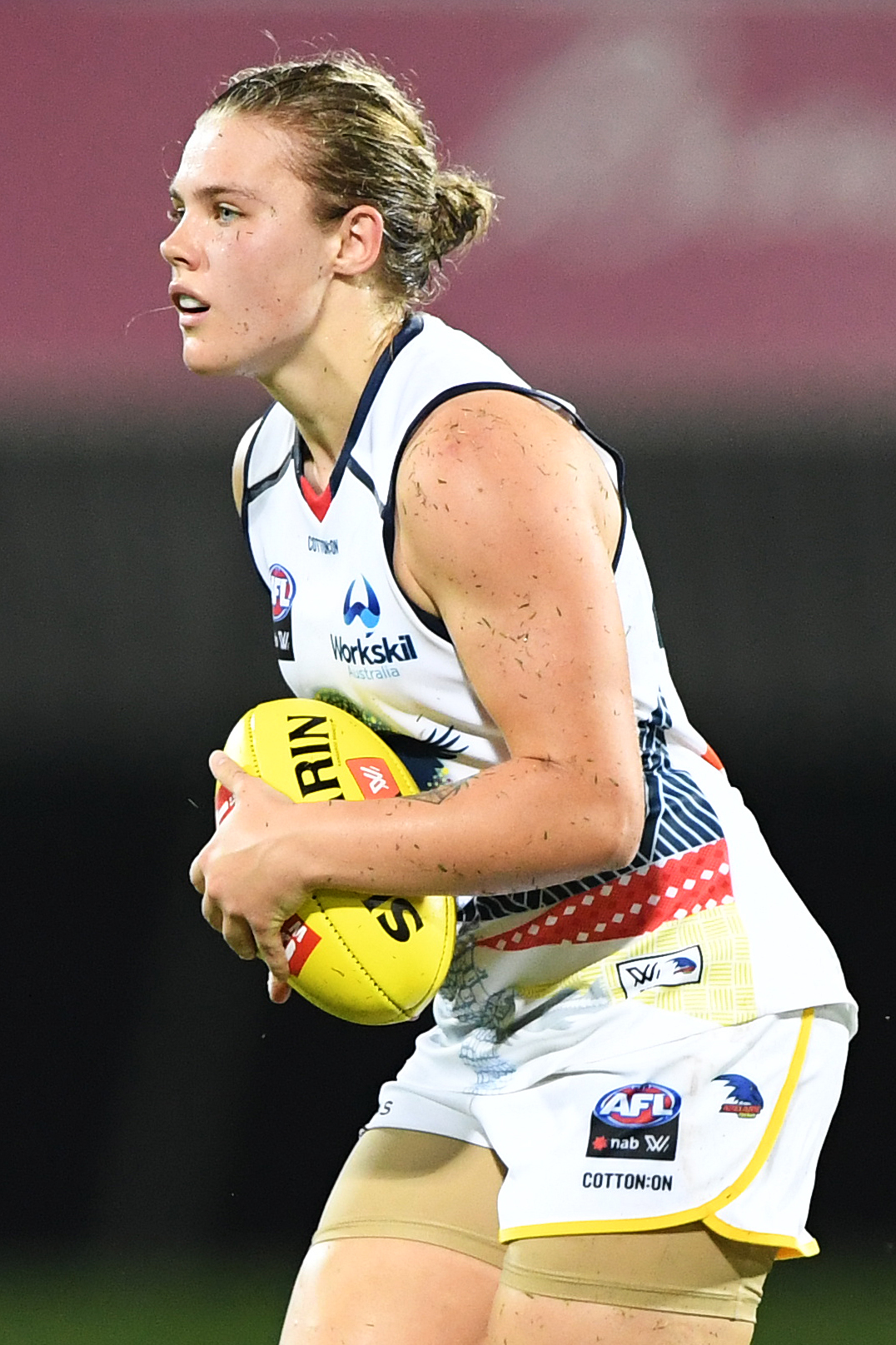
Chloe Scheer

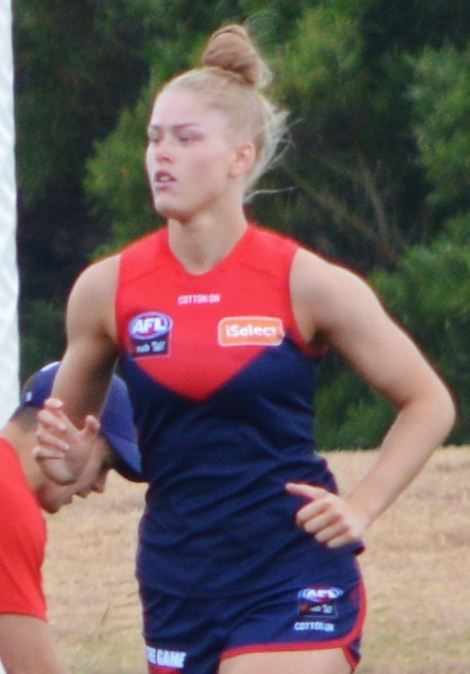
Ashleigh Woodland

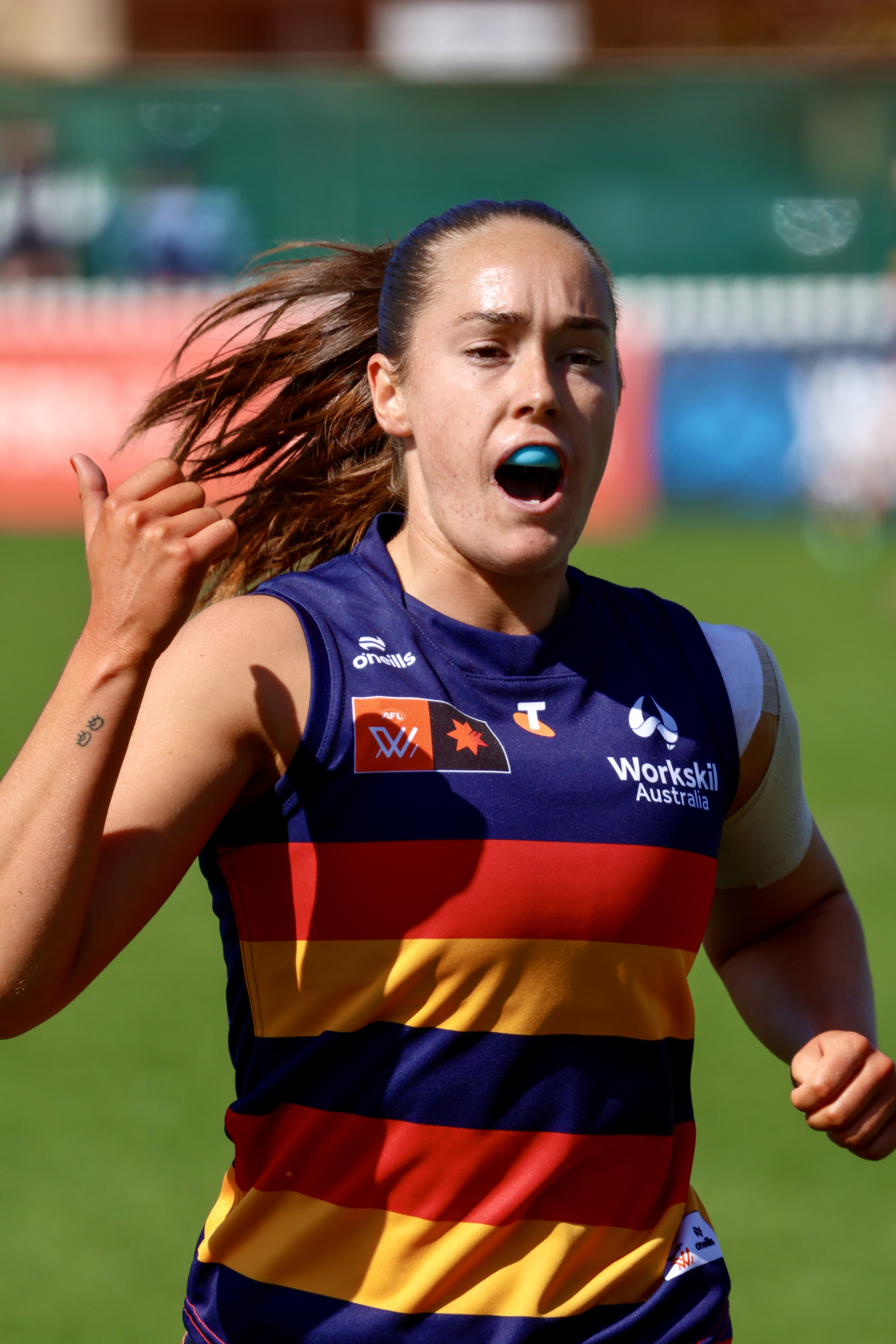
Maddi Newman

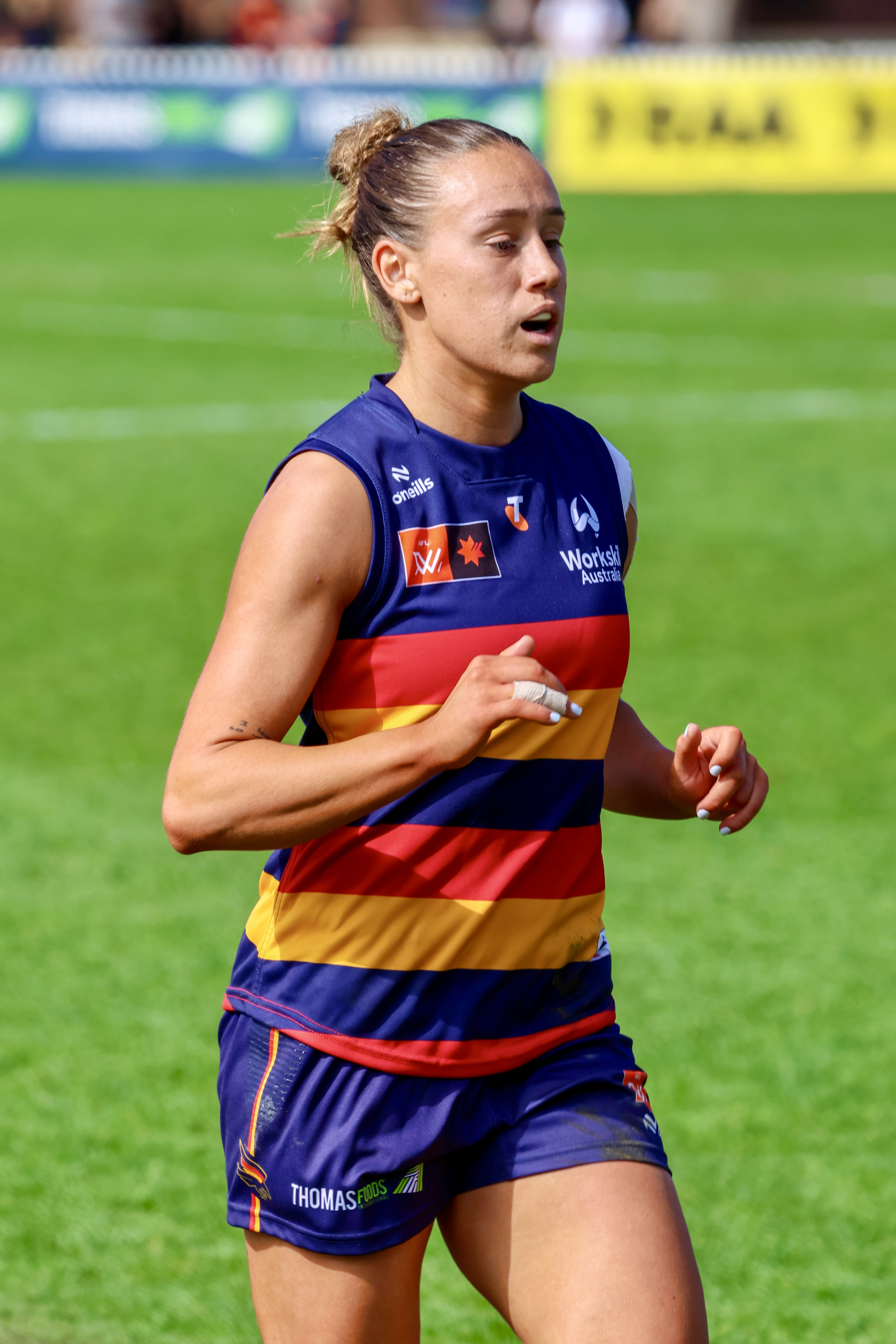
Hannah Munyard

Katelyn Pope

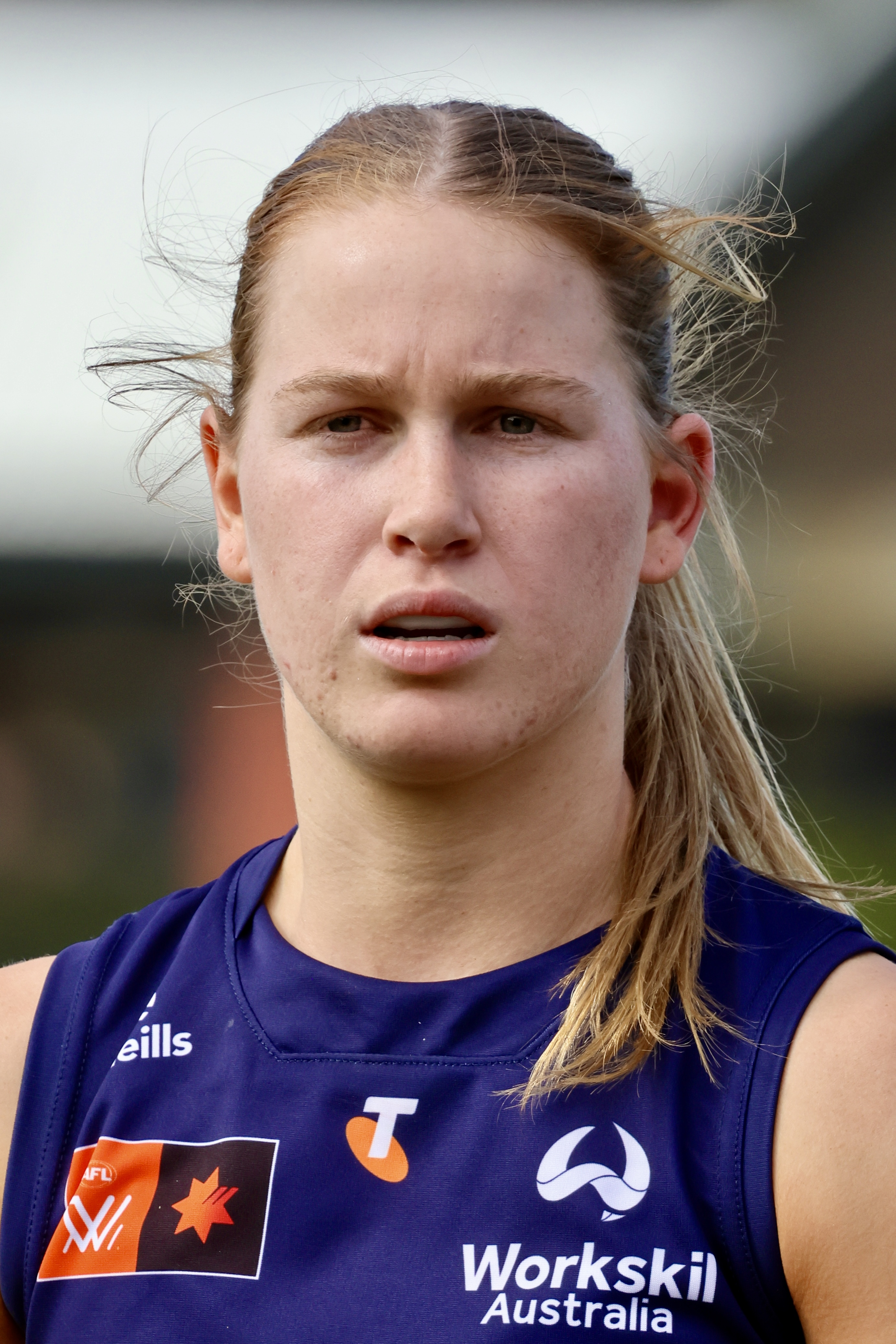
Teah Charlton

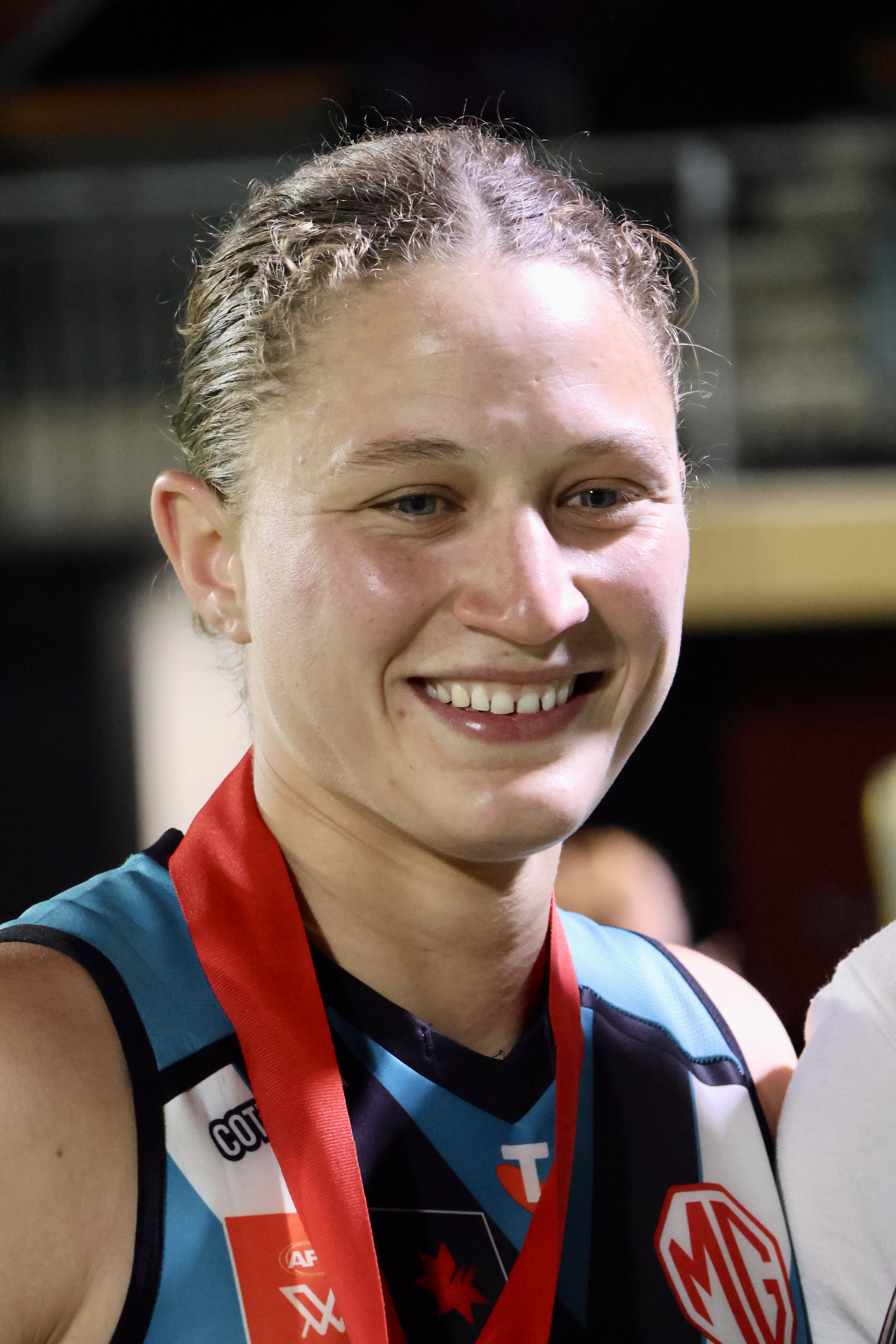
Abbey Dowrick

Zoe Prowse

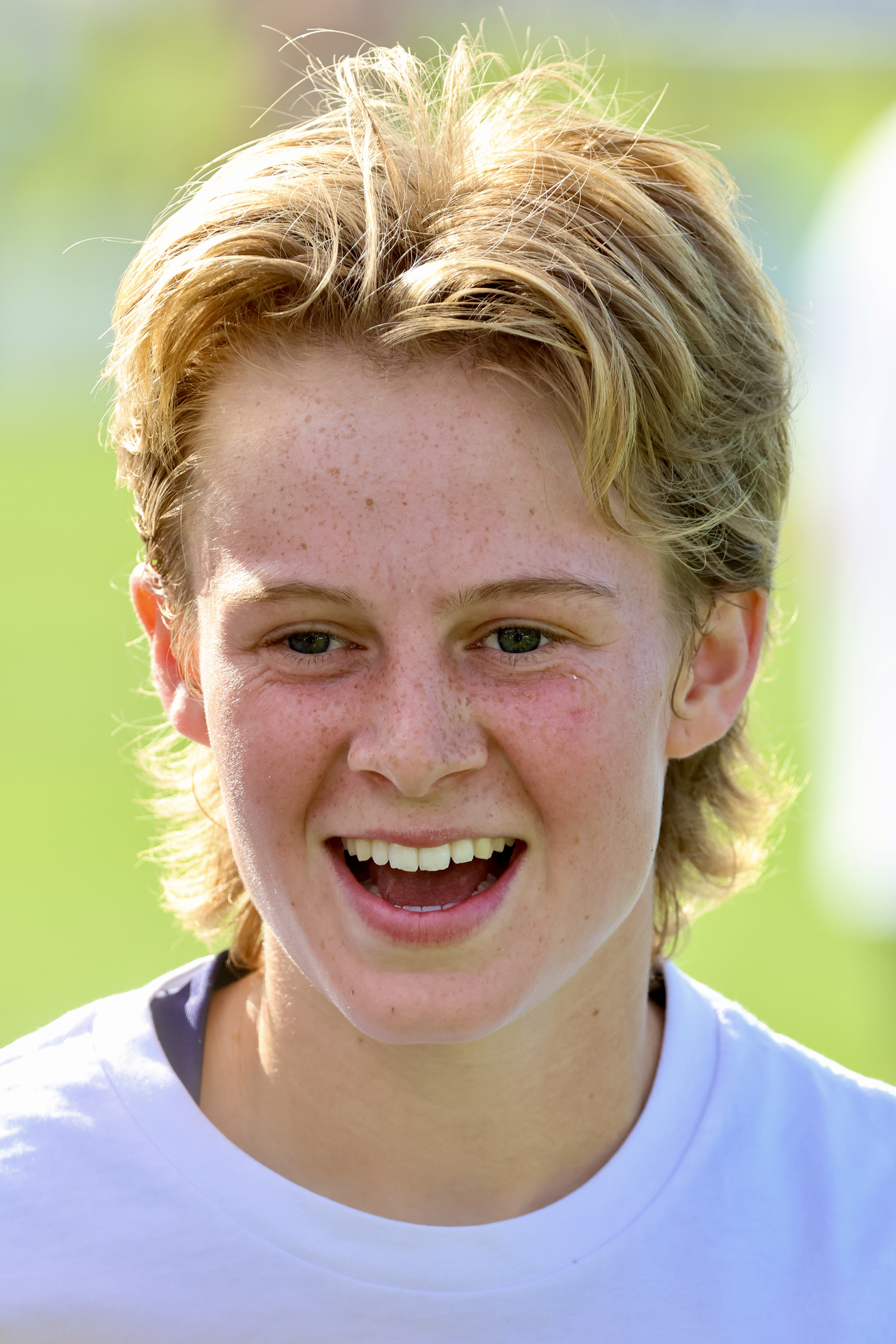
Brooke Tonon

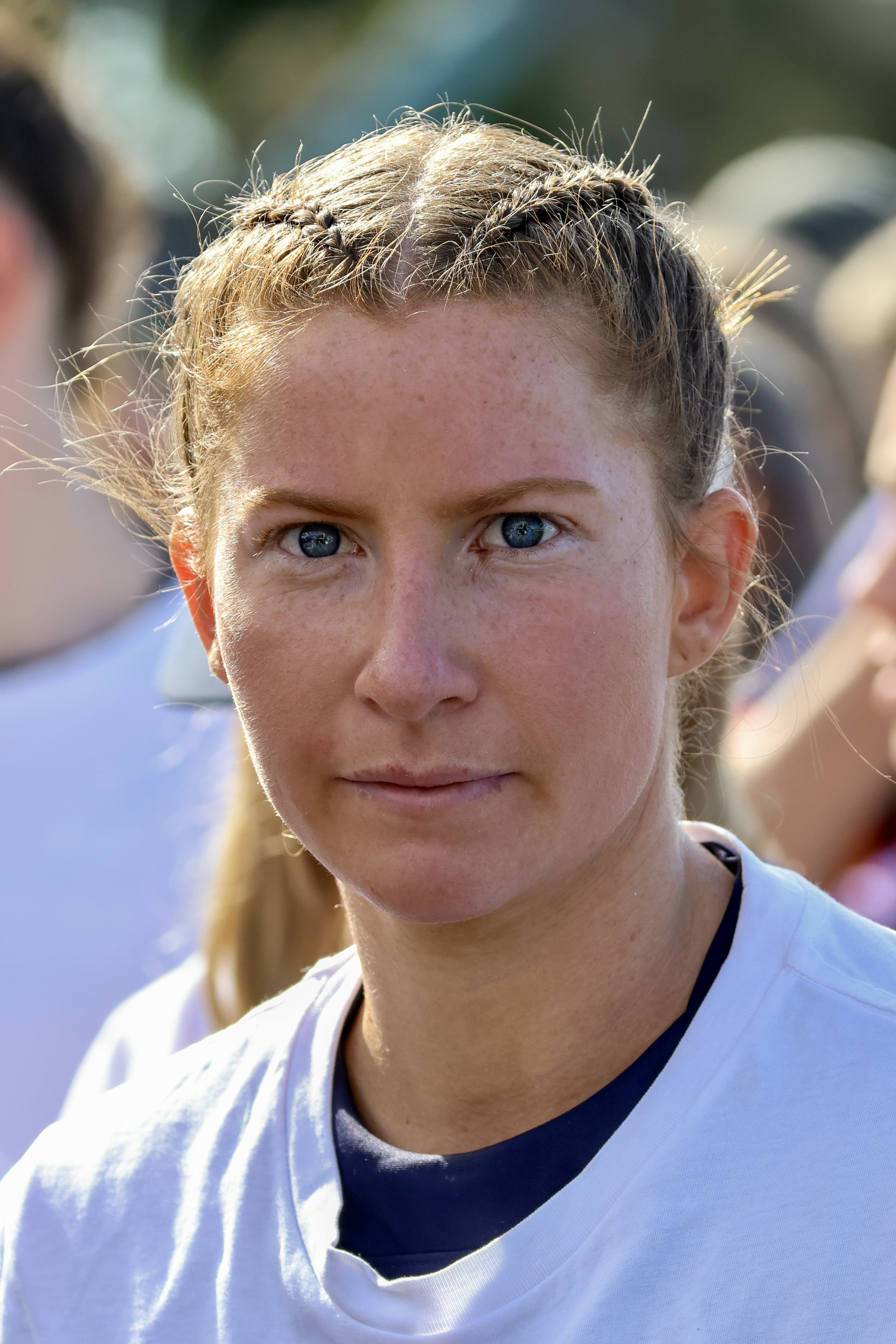
Sarah Goodwin

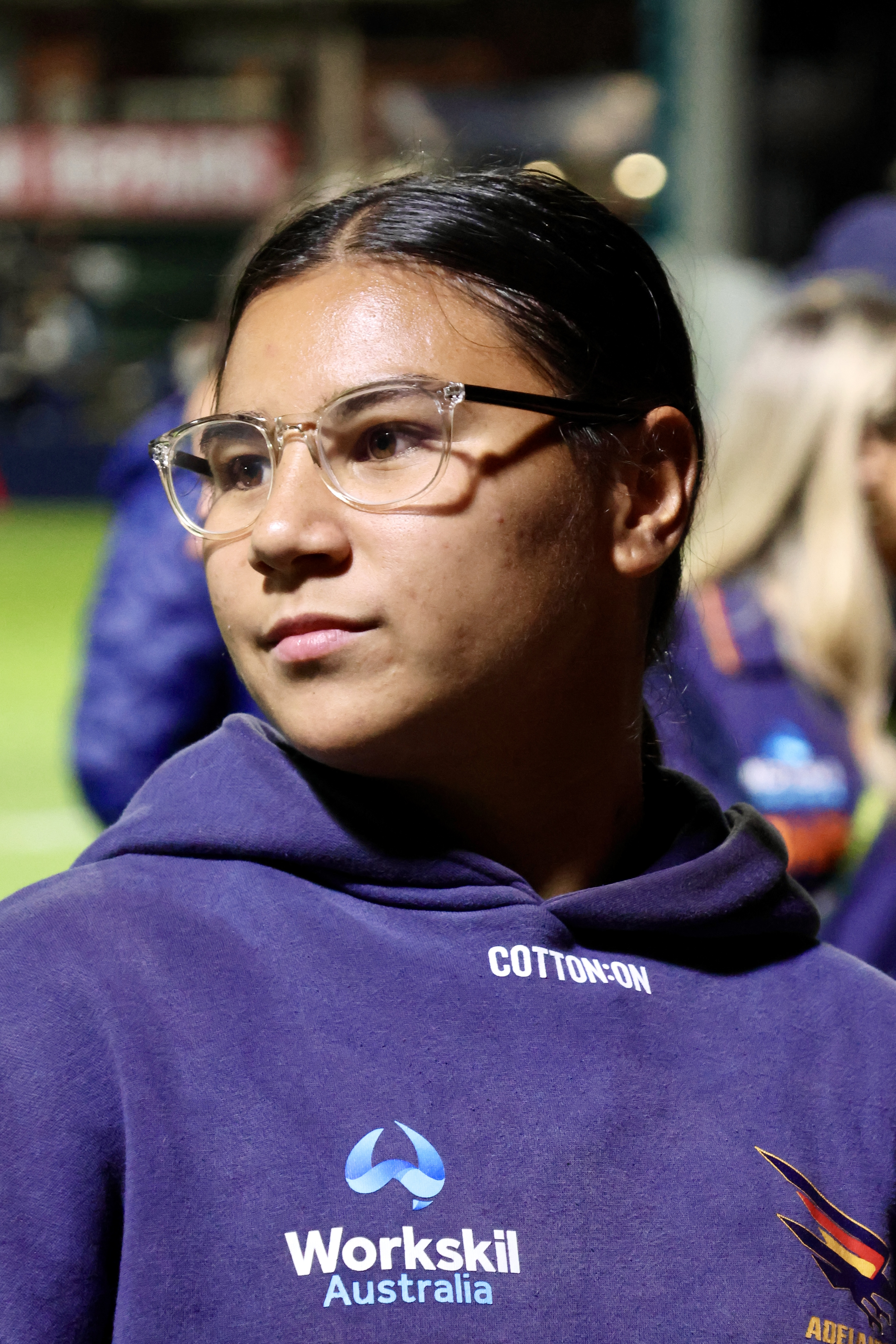
Hannah Ewings

Matilda Scholz

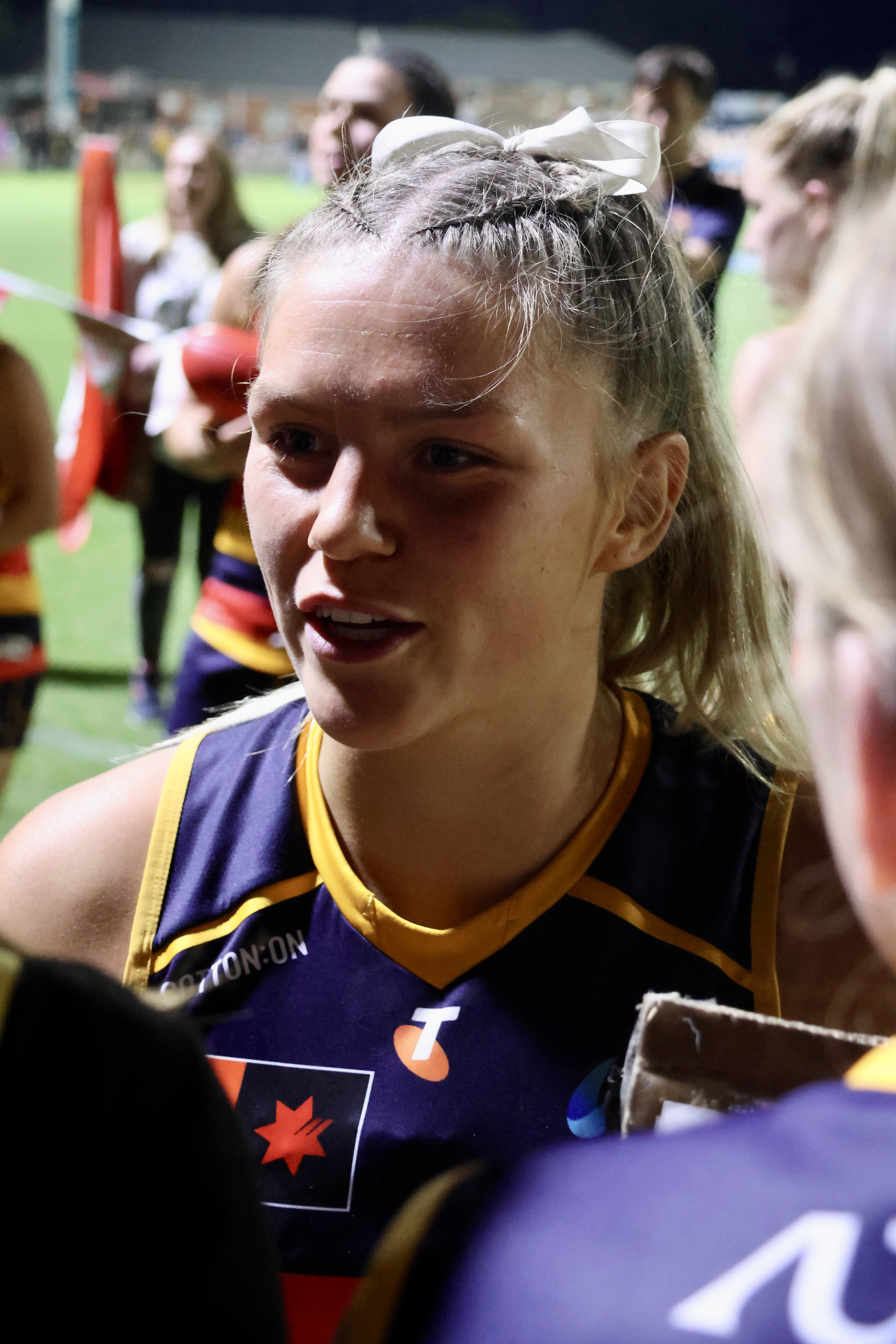
Brooke Boileau

Jasmine Evans

Player	Status	SA Indigenous links	SA Place of birth	SA junior club/s	SA senior club/s	SA Representative	AFLW Draft	Selection	AFLW debut year	AFLW Games	AFLW (Goals)	Connections to South Australia, Notes & References
Lily Smart	Inactive			Mt Lofty	Sturt	U18 (2025)	2026	11	Yet to debut			
Lauren Clifton	Active			Willunga	South Adelaide	U16 (2019), U18 (2020), U19 (2021)	2026	9	2026, R5	4	0	
Jasmine Evans	Active			Salisbury	Central District, Port Adelaide	U18 (2024)	2024	33	2025, R1	6	0	
Brooke Boileau	Active			Mount Compass	Adelaide	U18 (2023)	2023	22	2024, R1	18	3	Raised in and recruited from Victor Harbor
Lauren Young	Active			Goodwood Saints	West Adelaide, Port Adelaide	U18 (2021, 2023)	2023	Expansion U18 Talent Pathway pre-signing	2025, R6	11	8	
Elaine Grigg	Active			North Adelaide	Central Districts	U18 (2022, 2023)	2023	6	2024, R1	30	9	Recruited from Adelaide
Molly Brooksby	Active		Adelaide	Golden Grove	Port Adelaide	U18 (2022, 2023)	2023	Expansion U18 Talent Pathway pre-signing	2024, R1	34	0	Raised in Adelaide
Shineah Goody	Active			Henley, Edithburgh	Port Adelaide	U18 (2022, 2023)	2023	Expansion U18 Talent Pathway pre-signing	2024, R1	33	6	Raised in Edithburgh
Piper Window	Active			Morphettville Park	Port Adelaide	U18 (2022, 2023)	2023	19	2024, R1	19	0	Raised in Adelaide
Caitlin Wendland	Active			Willaston	Central Districts		2023	Replacement	2023, R6	14	1	Raised in Adelaide (Willaston)
Mattea Breed	Active			Norwood, Payneham Norwood Union	North Adelaide		2023	4	2023, R1	20	2	Recruited from Adelaide
Matilda Scholz	Active		Adelaide	Mitcham, Goodwood	Glenelg, Port Adelaide	U18 (2022, 2023)	2023	Priority signing	2023, R1	42	12	Raised in Adelaide
Jade Halfpenny	Inactive			Golden Grove	Norwood, Port Adelaide	U19 (2021)	2022	Open-age selection	2022, S2 R3	8	2	Raised in and recruited from Adelaide
Taylor Ortlepp	Inactive			-	-		2022	Rookie	2022, S2 R6	9	1	Raised in Adelaide
Leah Cutting	Inactive			Morphettville Park	Norwood		2021	Free agent	2022, R1	8	0	Raised in Adelaide
Olivia Fuller	Inactive			Millicent			2021	Mature-age concession	2022, R1	20	1	Raised in Millicent
Jessica Waterhouse	Inactive			Christie's Beach, Happy Valley	Adelaide		2022	Free agent	2022, S2 R5	12	5	Raised in Adelaide
Olivia Levicki	Inactive		Balaklava		Port Adelaide		2022	Rookie	2022, S2 R1	13	2	Born in Balaklava
Hannah Ewings	Active			Roopena, SMOSH West Lakes	North Adelaide, Port Adelaide	U18 (2022)	2022	3	2022, S2 R1	21	8	Raised in Whyalla
Sarah Goodwin	Active			Plympton, Goodwood Saints	Glenelg, Port Adelaide, Adelaide	U18 (2022)	2022	7	2022, S2 R4	54	3	
Jess Good	Active			Blackwood	Sturt		2022	Free agent	2022, S2 R1	51	6	Raised in Adelaide
Abbie Ballard	Inactive			Peake, Strathalbyn	West Adelaide, Adelaide	U18 (2018)	2021	34	2022, S2 R3	28	8	Raised in Adelaide
Brooke Tonon	Active			East Gambier, Scotch College	Glenelg, Adelaide		2021	20	2022, S2 R5	22	0	Raised in Mount Gambier
Zoe Prowse	Active			Glenunga, Mt Lofty	Sturt, Adelaide	U19 (2021)	2021	17	2022, R10	47	4	Raised in Adelaide
Ella Boag	Active			Henley	Glenelg, Port Adelaide	U18 (2022)	2022	31	2022, S2 R6	41	7	
Sachi Syme	Active			Port Lincoln	Norwood, Port Adelaide	U18 (2022)	2022	23	2022, S2 R1	43	2	
Julia Teakle	Active				Central District, Port Adelaide	U18 (2022)	2022	Open-age selection	2022, S2 R1	29	20	Western Australian product
Abbey Dowrick	Active				Woodville-West Torrens, Port Adelaide	U18 (2018)	2022	Open-age selection	2022, S2 R1	52	13	Western Australian product.
Amelie Borg	Active			Golden Grove	North Adelaide, Port Adelaide	U18 (2022)	2022	61	2022, S2 R1	53	0	
Teah Charlton	Active			Christie's Beach	South Adelaide, Adelaide	U18 (2018, 2019)	2020	4	2021, R1	85	19	Raised in Adelaide
Tahlia Meyer	Active			Morphettville Park	South Adelaide		2020	Free agent	2021, R1	21	2	Raised in Adelaide
Montana McKinnon	Active			South Adelaide	Adelaide	U18 (2018)	2020	14	2021, R1	36	1	
Katelyn Pope	Active			North Adelaide	Port Adelaide		2021	Injury replacement	2021, R2	23	5	Raised in Adelaide
Caitlin Gould	Active			Glenelg	Adelaide		2019	68	2020, R1	48	34	Raised in Adelaide
Cheyenne Hammond	Active			Willunga, Christie's Beach	South Adelaide, Port Adelaide		2019	57	2020, R1	40	2	Raised in Willunga
Chelsea Biddell	Active			West Adelaide	Adelaide		2019	102	2020, R1	72	4	Raised in Adelaide
Rachelle Martin	Inactive			West Adelaide	Adelaide	U18 (2018)	2020	45	2020, R1	46	14	Raised in Adelaide
Hannah Munyard	Active				South Adelaide, Adelaide		2020	Free agent	2020, R1	60	11	Raised in Adelaide
Najwa Allen	Active			Norwood	Adelaide		2019	37	2020, R1	55	0	Recruited from Adelaide
Madison Newman	Active			West Adelaide	Adelaide	U18 (2018, 2019)	2019	100	2020, R1	69	7	Recruited from Adelaide
Ashleigh Woodland	Active				North Adelaide, Adelaide		2018	Free agent	2019, R1	75	71	Raised in Adelaide
Chloe Scheer	Active			Salisbury West, Modbury	North Adelaide, Adelaide		2018	37	2019, R1	56	69	Raised in Adelaide (Gawler)
Hannah Button	Inactive		Yorke Peninsula	West Adelaide	Adelaide		2019	53	2019, R1	39	3	
Ebony O'Dea	Inactive		Springton	West Adelaide	Adelaide		2019	53	2019, R1	50	2	Born in Springton, raised in Adelaide
Marijana Randall	Retired			Norwood	Adelaide		2017	32	2018, R1	50	2	Raised in Adelaide
Eloise Jones	Active			Morphettville Park	Adelaide		2017	24	2018, R1	78	56	Raised in Adelaide
Jessica Allan	Active			Salisbury	Adelaide		2017	8	2018, R1	58	0	Raised in Beachport and Millicent
Tait Mackrill	Inactive			Broughton-Mundoora, Morphettville Park			2017	Rookie	2018, R1	22	5	Raised in Port Broughton
Sarah Allan	Active			Salisbury	Adelaide		2017	122	2017, R1	103	1	Raised in Beachport and Millicent
Ebony Marinoff	Active		Adelaide	Morphettville Park	Adelaide		2016	7	2017, R1	114	32	Raised in Adelaide
Anne Hatchard	Active			Morphettville Park	Adelaide		2016	87	2017, R1	109	44	Raised in Adelaide
Justine Mules	Active			Morphettville Park	Adelaide, Port Adelaide		2016	133	2017, R1	68	7	Raised in Adelaide
Deni Varnhagen	Retired			Morphettville Park	Adelaide		2016	26	2017, R1	33	6	Raised in Adelaide
Dayna Cox	Retired			Morphettville Park	Adelaide		2016	Free agent	2017, R1	32	0	Raised in Adelaide
Erin Phillips	Retired				Adelaide, Port Adelaide		2016	Rookie	2017, R1	66	52	Raised in Adelaide

== See also ==
- Australian rules football in South Australia
