= 2026 AdFL season =

2026 premiership season
- Date: 18 April – 19 September 2026

The 2026 AdFL season is the 108th season of the Adelaide Footy League (AdFL).

The season began on 18 April and scheduled to finish 19 September.

There are 7 Men's Divisions with Seniors and Reserve, as well as 8 C-Grade divisions. There are 6 Women's Divisions, with seniors and reserves for divisions 1 and 2.

== Team Changes ==
At the end of the 2025 season, Mawson Lakes and Greenacres had notified the competition of their intention to merge for the 2026 season. The merger did not go ahead as the clubs failed to meet timelines for a merger within the leagues regulations. Therefore Mawson Lakes went into recess for 2026 as it has player and volunteer shortages.

2026 AdFL season
| Division | Promoted to division | Relegated to division | Resigned |
|---|---|---|---|
| Division 1 | Tea Tree Gully, Athelstone | N/A | |
| Division 2 | Westminster OS, Unley Mercedes Jets | Broadview, Prince Alfred OC | |
| Division 3 | Plympton, Walkerville | Adelaide University, Lockleys | |
| Division 4 | Marion, Pulteney | Hope Valley, Scotch OC | |
| Division 5 | Fitzroy, St Paul's OS | Kenilworth, SMOSH West Lakes | |
| Division 6 | Elizabeth | Trinity OS, Gaza | |
| Division 7 | N/A | West Croydon, Adelaide Lutheran | Mawson Lakes |

=== Locations ===
Colours indicate club's highest level of competition
Red = Division 1
Orange= Division 2
Yellow = Division 3
Green = Division 4
Light blue = Division 5
Blue = Division 6
Pink= Division 7
Purple = Women only

== Division 1 ==
=== Seniors ===
Win-Loss Home matches are indicated in bold.

| + | Win | | Eliminated |
| − | Loss | X | Bye |
| | Draw | | |

| Team | Home-and-away season | | | | | | | | | | | | | | | | | | Finals series | | | |
| Team | 1 | 2 | 3 | 4 | 5 | 6 | 7 | 8 | 9 | 10 | 11 | 12 | 13 | 14 | 15 | 16 | 17 | 18 | FW1 | FW2 | FW3 | GF |
|---|---|---|---|---|---|---|---|---|---|---|---|---|---|---|---|---|---|---|---|---|---|---|
| Athelstone | ROC -47 | SALN +16 | TTG -13 | SHOC 0 | PNU +109 | PD +51 | GLE -16 | SPOC +14 | GG +6 | ROC -4 | SALN -32 | TTG -5 | SHOC +51 | PNU +91 | **PD** | GLE | SPOC | **GG** | | | | |
| Glenunga | SHOC +41 | GG -11 | SPOC -40 | ROC -23 | SALN -6 | TTG 0 | ATH +16 | PD -5 | PNU +118 | SHOC +12 | GG +15 | SPOC +14 | ROC +46 | SALN +84 | TTG | **ATH** | **PD** | PNU | | | | |
| Golden Grove | PD +20 | GLE +11 | SHOC +10 | SPOC +22 | ROC -16 | SALN +31 | TTG +15 | PNU +114 | ATH -6 | PD -43 | GLE -15 | SHOC +31 | SPOC +65 | ROC +58 | SALN | **TTG** | **PNU** | ATH | | | | |
| Payneham Norwood Union | SPOC -59 | ROC -30 | SALN -106 | TTG -38 | ATH -109 | SHOC -114 | PD -114 | GG -114 | GLE -118 | SPOC -47 | ROC -29 | SALN -41 | TTG -33 | ATH -91 | **SHOC** | PD | GG | **GLE** | | | | |
| Port District | GG -20 | SPOC 0 | ROC +70 | SALN +22 | TTG +30 | ATH -51 | PNU +114 | GLE +5 | SHOC +46 | GG +43 | SPOC -33 | ROC +24 | SALN -70 | TTG +109 | ATH | **PNU** | GLE | **SHOC** | | | | |
| Rostrevor OC | ATH +47 | PNU +30 | PD -70 | GLE +23 | GG +16 | SPOC +30 | SHOC +3 | TTG +25 | SALN -28 | ATH +4 | PNU +29 | PD -24 | GLE -46 | GG -58 | **SPOC** | SHOC | **TTG** | SALN | | | | |
| Sacred Heart OC | GLE -41 | TTG +31 | GG -10 | ATH 0 | SPOC +4 | PNU +114 | ROC -3 | SALN -42 | PD -46 | GLE -12 | TTG -30 | GG -31 | ATH -51 | SPOC -10 | PNU | **ROC** | **SALN** | PD | | | | |
| Salisbury North | TTG +19 | ATH -16 | PNU +106 | PD -22 | GLE +6 | GG -31 | SPOC +41 | SHOC +42 | ROC +28 | TTG +10 | ATH +32 | PNU +41 | PD +70 | GLE -84 | **GG** | SPOC | SHOC | **ROC** | | | | |
| St. Peters OC | PNU +59 | PD 0 | GLE +40 | GG -22 | SHOC -4 | ROC -30 | SALN -41 | ATH -14 | TTG -10 | PNU +47 | PD +33 | GLE -14 | GG -65 | SHOC +10 | ROC | **SALN** | **ATH** | TTG | | | | |
| Tea Tree Gully | SALN -19 | SHOC -31 | ATH +13 | PNU +38 | PD -30 | GLE 0 | GG -15 | ROC -25 | SPOC +10 | SALN -10 | SHOC +30 | ATH +5 | PNU +33 | PD -109 | **GLE** | GG | ROC | **SPOC** | | | | |

Source: PlayHQ

Ladder

| Team | Pld | W | L | D | PF | PA | PP | Pts |
|---|---|---|---|---|---|---|---|---|
| Port District | 14 | 10 | 3 | 1 | 1198 | 843 | 58.69 | 21 |
| Golden Grove | 14 | 10 | 4 | 0 | 1216 | 919 | 56.95 | 20 |
| Salisbury North | 14 | 10 | 4 | 0 | 1176 | 934 | 55.73 | 20 |
| Rostrevor OC | 14 | 9 | 5 | 0 | 956 | 975 | 49.50 | 18 |
| Glenunga | 14 | 8 | 5 | 1 | 1152 | 891 | 56.38 | 17 |
| Athelstone | 14 | 7 | 6 | 1 | 1219 | 998 | 54.98 | 15 |
| Tea Tree Gully | 14 | 6 | 7 | 1 | 940 | 1050 | 47.23 | 13 |
| St. Peters OC | 14 | 4 | 9 | 1 | 937 | 1014 | 48.02 | 9 |
| Sacred Heart OC | 14 | 3 | 10 | 1 | 937 | 1064 | 46.82 | 7 |
| Payneham Norwood Union | 14 | 0 | 14 | 0 | 604 | 1647 | 26.83 | 0 |

Ladder and Win-Loss correct as 28/07/2026 PlayHQ

== Division 2 ==
=== Seniors ===
| Team | Home-and-away season | | | | | | | | | | | | | | | | | | Finals series | | | |
| Team | 1 | 2 | 3 | 4 | 5 | 6 | 7 | 8 | 9 | 10 | 11 | 12 | 13 | 14 | 15 | 16 | 17 | 18 | FW1 | FW2 | FW3 | GF |
|---|---|---|---|---|---|---|---|---|---|---|---|---|---|---|---|---|---|---|---|---|---|---|
| Brighton | PAOC -13 | OI -14 | BRO -1 | FP +26 | WOS +95 | MOD -10 | GS +18 | UMJ -39 | HEN -18 | PAOC +42 | OI +39 | BRO +1 | FP +39 | WOS +86 | MOD | **GS** | **UMJ** | HEN | | | | |
| Broadview | HEN +7 | PAOC -26 | BRI +1 | WOS -34 | GS 0 | UMJ +15 | OI +20 | MOD -1 | FP +56 | HEN -18 | PAOC +11 | BRI -1 | WOS +73 | GS -6 | UMJ | **OI** | **MOD** | FP | | | | |
| Flinders Park | GS -1 | UMJ +43 | OI -64 | BRI -26 | MOD -22 | HEN 0 | PAOC +2 | WOS 0 | BRO -56 | GS -7 | UMJ +72 | OI -36 | BRI -39 | MOD +20 | **HEN** | PAOC | WOS | **BRO** | | | | |
| Goodwood Saints | FP +1 | MOD +33 | HEN -22 | PAOC -33 | BRO 0 | WOS +7 | BRI +18 | OI -14 | UMJ -3 | FP +7 | MOD +18 | HEN -41 | PAOC +2 | BRO +6 | **WOS** | BRI | **OI** | UMJ | | | | |
| Henley | BRO -7 | WOS +58 | GS +22 | UMJ -10 | OI -16 | FP 0 | MOD +4 | PAOC +20 | BRI +18 | BRO +18 | WOS +42 | GS +41 | UMJ +54 | OI +23 | FP | **MOD** | PAOC | **BRI** | | | | |
| Modbury | WOS +4 | GS -33 | UMJ +1 | OI +17 | FP +22 | BRI +10 | HEN -4 | BRO +1 | PAOC -27 | WOS +24 | GS +18 | UMJ +63 | OI -92 | FP -20 | **BRI** | HEN | BRO | **PAOC** | | | | |
| Old Ignatians | UMJ +44 | BRI +14 | FP +64 | MOD -17 | HEN +16 | PAOC -44 | BRO -20 | GS +14 | WOS +17 | UMJ +18 | BRI -39 | FP +36 | MOD +92 | HEN -23 | **PAOC** | BRO | GS | WOS | | | | |
| Prince Alfred OC | BRI +13 | BRO +26 | WOS +57 | GS +33 | UMJ +6 | OI +44 | FP -2 | HEN -20 | MOD +27 | BRI -42 | BRO -11 | WOS +60 | GS -2 | UMJ +96 | OI | **FP** | **HEN** | MOD | | | | |
| Unley Mercedes | OI -44 | FP -43 | MOD -1 | HEN +10 | PAOC -6 | BRO -15 | WOS -35 | BRI +39 | GS +3 | OI -18 | FP -72 | MOD -63 | HEN -54 | PAOC -96 | BRO | WOS | BRI | GS | | | | |
| Westminster OS | MOD -4 | HEN -58 | PAOC -57 | BRO +34 | BRI -95 | GS -7 | UMJ +35 | FP 0 | OI -17 | MOD -24 | HEN -42 | PAOC -60 | BRO -73 | BRI -86 | GS | **UMJ** | **FP** | **OI** | | | | |

| Team | Pld | W | L | D | PF | PA | PP | Pts |
|---|---|---|---|---|---|---|---|---|
| Henley | 14 | 10 | 3 | 1 | 1215 | 948 | 56.17 | 21 |
| Prince Alfred OC | 14 | 9 | 5 | 0 | 1187 | 902 | 56.82 | 18 |
| Old Ignatians | 14 | 9 | 5 | 0 | 947 | 775 | 54.99 | 18 |
| Brighton Bombers | 14 | 8 | 6 | 0 | 1184 | 933 | 55.92 | 16 |
| Modbury | 14 | 8 | 6 | 0 | 971 | 1023 | 48.69 | 16 |
| Broadview | 14 | 7 | 6 | 1 | 1078 | 981 | 52.35 | 15 |
| Goodwood Saints | 14 | 7 | 6 | 1 | 818 | 875 | 48.31 | 15 |
| Flinders Park | 14 | 4 | 8 | 2 | 871 | 985 | 46.92 | 10 |
| Unley Mercedes Jets | 14 | 3 | 11 | 0 | 755 | 1150 | 39.63 | 6 |
| Westminster OS | 14 | 2 | 11 | 1 | 924 | 1378 | 40.13 | 5 |

Ladder and Win-Loss correct as 28/07/2026 PlayHQ

== Division 3 ==
=== Seniors ===
| Team | Home-and-away season | | | | | | | | | | | | | | | | | | Finals series | | | |
| Team | 1 | 2 | 3 | 4 | 5 | 6 | 7 | 8 | 9 | 10 | 11 | 12 | 13 | 14 | 15 | 16 | 17 | 18 | FW1 | FW2 | FW3 | GF |
|---|---|---|---|---|---|---|---|---|---|---|---|---|---|---|---|---|---|---|---|---|---|---|
| Adelaide University | POS -4 | EDW -80 | LOC -3 | SR -130 | KIL -30 | NH -24 | PHOSC -66 | WAL -48 | PLY -135 | POS -69 | EDW -19 | LOC -27 | SR -45 | KIL -109 | **NH** | PHOSC | WAL | **PLY** | | | | |
| Edwardstown | NH -26 | AU +80 | PHOSC -12 | LOC +28 | PLY -4 | SR -43 | WAL -54 | POS +4 | KIL 0 | NH +1 | AU +19 | PHOSC -37 | LOC +12 | PLY -28 | SR | **WAL** | **POS** | KIL | | | | |
| Kilburn | PHOSC -53 | PLY +5 | WAL -26 | POS +12 | AU +30 | LOC +12 | SR -70 | NH -16 | EDW 0 | PHOSC +3 | PLY -79 | WAL -59 | POS -11 | AU +109 | LOC | **SR** | NH | **EDW** | | | | |
| Lockleys | WAL -1 | POS -40 | AU +3 | EDW -28 | SR -17 | KIL -12 | NH +23 | PLY -17 | PHOSC -2 | WAL -15 | POS +9 | AU +27 | EDW -12 | SR -31 | **KIL** | NH | PLY | **PHOSC** | | | | |
| North Haven | EDW +26 | PHOSC +15 | PLY +11 | WAL +5 | POS +45 | AU +24 | LOC -23 | KIL +16 | SR +1 | EDW -1 | PHOSC -69 | PLY -22 | WAL -40 | POS +17 | AU | **LOC** | **KIL** | SR | | | | |
| Pembroke OS | AU +4 | LOC +40 | SR -34 | KIL -12 | NH -45 | PHOSC -23 | PLY +56 | EDW -4 | WAL -51 | AU +69 | LOC -9 | SR -59 | KIL +11 | NH -17 | **PHOSC** | PLY | EDW | **WAL** | | | | |
| PHOS Camden | KIL +53 | NH -15 | EDW +12 | PLY -16 | WAL -65 | POS +23 | AU +66 | SR -10 | LOC +2 | KIL -3 | NH +69 | EDW +37 | PLY +7 | WAL +5 | POS | **AU** | **SR** | LOC | | | | |
| Plympton | SR -7 | KIL -5 | NH -11 | PHOSC +16 | EDW +4 | WAL +44 | POS -56 | LOC +17 | AU +135 | SR -6 | KIL +79 | NH +22 | PHOSC -7 | EDW +28 | WAL | **POS** | **LOC** | AU | | | | |
| Seaton Ramblers | PLY +7 | WAL -17 | POS +34 | AU +130 | LOC +17 | EDW +43 | KIL +70 | PHOSC +10 | NH -1 | PLY +6 | WAL -69 | POS +59 | AU +45 | LOC +31 | **EDW** | KIL | PHOSC | **NH** | | | | |
| Walkerville | LOC +1 | SR +17 | KIL +26 | NH -5 | PHOSC +65 | PLY -44 | EDW +54 | AU +48 | POS +51 | LOC +15 | SR +69 | KIL +59 | NH +40 | PHOSC -5 | **PLY** | EDW | **AU** | POS | | | | |

| Team | Pld | W | L | D | PF | PA | PP | Pts |
|---|---|---|---|---|---|---|---|---|
| Walkerville | 14 | 11 | 3 | 0 | 1283 | 892 | 58.98 | 22 |
| Seaton Ramblers | 14 | 11 | 3 | 0 | 1275 | 910 | 58.35 | 22 |
| PHOS Camden | 14 | 9 | 5 | 0 | 1153 | 988 | 53.85 | 18 |
| North Haven | 14 | 9 | 5 | 0 | 932 | 927 | 50.13 | 18 |
| Plympton | 14 | 8 | 6 | 0 | 1101 | 848 | 56.49 | 16 |
| Edwardstown | 14 | 6 | 7 | 1 | 949 | 1009 | 48.46 | 13 |
| Kilburn | 14 | 6 | 7 | 1 | 1092 | 1235 | 46.92 | 13 |
| Pembroke OS | 14 | 5 | 9 | 0 | 900 | 974 | 48.02 | 10 |
| Lockleys | 14 | 4 | 10 | 0 | 1085 | 1198 | 47.52 | 8 |
| Adelaide University | 14 | 0 | 14 | 0 | 709 | 1498 | 32.12 | 0 |

Ladder and Win-Loss correct as 28/07/2026 PlayHQ

== Division 4 ==
=== Seniors ===
| Team | Home-and-away season | | | | | | | | | | | | | | | | | | Finals series | | | |
| Team | 1 | 2 | 3 | 4 | 5 | 6 | 7 | 8 | 9 | 10 | 11 | 12 | 13 | 14 | 15 | 16 | 17 | 18 | FW1 | FW2 | FW3 | GF |
|---|---|---|---|---|---|---|---|---|---|---|---|---|---|---|---|---|---|---|---|---|---|---|
| CBC OC | HEC -55 | HV +18 | CLG +21 | MIT +38 | MP +31 | PUL +17 | MAR -26 | SOC -26 | GC +40 | HEC +18 | HV +29 | CLG +24 | MIT +40 | MP -1 | **PUL** | **MAR** | SOC | **GC** | | | | |
| Colonel Light Gardens | MIT -29 | MP -13 | CBC -21 | MAR -5 | GC +18 | SOC -36 | HEC -47 | PUL -8 | HV -43 | MIT -1 | MP +38 | CBC -24 | MAR -60 | GC +12 | **SOC** | HEC | PUL | **HV** | | | | |
| Gepps Cross | PUL +55 | SOC -23 | HEC -57 | HV -5 | CLG -18 | MIT +26 | MP -14 | MAR -51 | CBC -40 | PUL +4 | SOC -100 | HEC -52 | HV +38 | CLG -12 | MIT | **MP** | **MAR** | CBC | | | | |
| Hectorville | CBC +55 | MAR +44 | GC +57 | SOC +36 | PUL +163 | HV 0 | CLG +47 | MP +52 | MIT +63 | CBC -18 | MAR +16 | GC +52 | SOC -25 | PUL +50 | HV | **CLG** | **MP** | MIT | | | | |
| Hope Valley | MP +20 | CBC -18 | MAR +38 | GC +5 | SOC +49 | HEC 0 | PUL +34 | MIT +24 | CLG +43 | MP -39 | CBC -29 | MAR -23 | GC -38 | SOC -27 | **HEC** | PUL | **MIT** | CLG | | | | |
| Marion | SOC +15 | HEC -44 | HV -38 | CLG +5 | MIT +41 | MP +36 | CBC +26 | GC +51 | PUL +36 | SOC -30 | HEC -16 | HV +23 | CLG +60 | MIT +80 | MP | CBC | GC | **PUL** | | | | |
| Mitcham | CLG +29 | PUL +34 | MP +3 | CBC -38 | MAR -41 | GC -26 | SOC -11 | HV -24 | HEC -63 | CLG +1 | PUL +33 | MP +50 | CBC -40 | MAR -80 | **GC** | SOC | HV | **HEC** | | | | |
| Morphettville Park | HV -20 | CLG +13 | MIT -3 | PUL -8 | CBC -31 | MAR -36 | GC +14 | HEC -52 | SOC -30 | HV +39 | CLG -38 | MIT -50 | PUL -14 | CBC +1 | **MAR** | GC | HEC | **SOC** | | | | |
| Pulteney | GC -55 | MIT -34 | SOC -64 | MP +8 | HEC -163 | CBC -17 | HV -34 | CLG +8 | MAR -36 | GC -4 | MIT -33 | SOC -23 | MP +14 | HEC -50 | CBC | **HV** | **CLG** | MAR | | | | |
| Scotch OC | MAR -15 | GC +23 | PUL +64 | HEC -36 | HV -49 | CLG +36 | MIT +11 | CBC +26 | MP +30 | MAR +30 | GC +100 | PUL +23 | HEC +25 | HV +27 | CLG | **MIT** | **CBC** | MP | | | | |

| Team | Pld | W | L | D | PF | PA | PP | Pts |
|---|---|---|---|---|---|---|---|---|
| Hectorville | 14 | 11 | 2 | 1 | 1280 | 688 | 65.04 | 23 |
| Scotch OC | 14 | 11 | 3 | 0 | 1214 | 919 | 56.91 | 22 |
| Marion | 14 | 10 | 4 | 0 | 1068 | 823 | 56.47 | 20 |
| CBC Old Collegians | 14 | 10 | 4 | 0 | 1159 | 991 | 53.90 | 20 |
| Hope Valley | 14 | 7 | 6 | 1 | 1152 | 1113 | 50.86 | 15 |
| Mitcham | 14 | 6 | 8 | 0 | 930 | 1103 | 45.74 | 12 |
| Morphettville Park | 14 | 5 | 9 | 0 | 993 | 1180 | 45.69 | 10 |
| Gepps Cross | 14 | 4 | 10 | 0 | 889 | 1138 | 43.85 | 8 |
| Colonel Light Gardens | 14 | 3 | 11 | 0 | 910 | 1129 | 44.62 | 6 |
| Pulteney | 14 | 2 | 12 | 0 | 777 | 1288 | 37.62 | 4 |

Ladder and Win-Loss correct as 28/07/2026 PlayHQ

== Division 5 ==
=== Seniors ===
| Team | Home-and-away season | | | | | | | | | | | | | | | | | | Finals series | | | |
| Team | 1 | 2 | 3 | 4 | 5 | 6 | 7 | 8 | 9 | 10 | 11 | 12 | 13 | 14 | 15 | 16 | 17 | 18 | FW1 | FW2 | FW3 | GF |
|---|---|---|---|---|---|---|---|---|---|---|---|---|---|---|---|---|---|---|---|---|---|---|
| Eastern Park | WS -66 | POO -104 | SPOS +35 | FIT +15 | KEN +14 | GRE -63 | POR +120 | SMOSH -65 | SAL -67 | WS -12 | POO -8 | SPOS +30 | FIT +49 | KEN -12 | GRE | **POR** | **SMOSH** | SAL | | | | |
| Fitzroy | SMOSH -25 | WS -10 | POO -78 | EP -15 | SPOS +21 | KEN +21 | GRE -120 | SAL +5 | POR +93 | SMOSH -57 | WS -21 | POO -67 | EP -49 | SPOS -10 | KEN | **GRE** | SAL | POR | | | | |
| Greenacres | POR +155 | SAL +37 | SMOSH +19 | WS -2 | POO +19 | EP +63 | FIT +120 | SPOS +119 | KEN +49 | POR +172 | SAL +64 | SMOSH +20 | WS +13 | POO -66 | EP | FIT | SPOS | **KEN** | | | | |
| Kenilworth | SAL -26 | SMOSH -85 | WS +28 | POO -100 | EP -14 | FIT -21 | SPOS +81 | POR +71 | GRE -49 | SAL -49 | SMOSH +54 | WS +2 | POO -12 | EP +12 | **FIT** | SPOS | **POR** | GRE | | | | |
| Pooraka | SPOS +42 | EP +104 | FIT +78 | KEN +100 | GRE -19 | POR +110 | SAL +20 | WS +1 | SMOSH +13 | SPOS +90 | EP +8 | FIT +67 | KEN +12 | GRE +66 | POR | **SAL** | **WS** | SMOSH | | | | |
| Portland | GRE -155 | SPOS -41 | SAL -167 | SMOSH -163 | WS -52 | POO -110 | EP -120 | KEN -71 | FIT -93 | GRE -172 | SPOS -24 | SAL -137 | SMOSH -117 | WS -142 | **POO** | EP | KEN | **FIT** | | | | |
| Salisbury | KEN +26 | GRE -37 | POR +167 | SPOS +51 | SMOSH +8 | WS +26 | POO -20 | FIT -5 | EP +67 | KEN +49 | GRE -64 | POR +137 | SPOS +199 | SMOSH -14 | WS | POO | **FIT** | **EP** | | | | |
| SMOSH West Lakes | FIT +25 | KEN +85 | GRE -19 | POR +163 | SAL -8 | SPOS +76 | WS +11 | EP +65 | POO -13 | FIT +57 | KEN -54 | GRE -20 | POR +117 | SAL +14 | **SPOS** | WS | EP | **POO** | | | | |
| St Paul's OS | POO -42 | POR +41 | EP -35 | SAL -51 | FIT -21 | SMOSH -76 | KEN -81 | GRE -119 | WS -19 | POO -90 | POR +24 | EP -30 | SAL -199 | FIT +10 | SMOSH | **KEN** | **GRE** | WS | | | | |
| Woodville South | EP +66 | FIT +10 | KEN -28 | GRE +2 | POR +52 | SAL -26 | SMOSH -11 | POO -1 | SPOS +19 | EP +12 | FIT +21 | KEN -2 | GRE -13 | POR +142 | **SAL** | **SMOSH** | POO | **SPOS** | | | | |

| Team | Pld | W | L | D | PF | PA | PP | Pts |
|---|---|---|---|---|---|---|---|---|
| Pooraka | 14 | 13 | 1 | 0 | 1526 | 834 | 64.66 | 26 |
| Greenacres | 14 | 12 | 2 | 0 | 1695 | 913 | 64.99 | 24 |
| Salisbury | 14 | 9 | 5 | 0 | 1468 | 878 | 62.57 | 18 |
| SMOSH West Lakes | 14 | 9 | 5 | 0 | 1422 | 923 | 60.63 | 18 |
| Woodville South | 14 | 8 | 6 | 0 | 1194 | 951 | 55.66 | 16 |
| Eastern Park | 14 | 6 | 8 | 0 | 1410 | 1544 | 47.73 | 12 |
| Kenilworth | 14 | 6 | 8 | 0 | 998 | 1106 | 47.43 | 12 |
| Fitzroy | 14 | 4 | 10 | 0 | 1060 | 1372 | 43.58 | 8 |
| St Paul's OS | 14 | 3 | 11 | 0 | 1025 | 1713 | 37.43 | 6 |
| Portland | 14 | 0 | 14 | 0 | 822 | 2386 | 25.62 | 0 |

Ladder and Win-Loss correct as 28/07/2026 PlayHQ

== Division 6 ==
=== Seniors ===
| Team | Home-and-away season | | | | | | | | | | | | | | | | | | Finals series | | | |
| Team | 1 | 2 | 3 | 4 | 5 | 6 | 7 | 8 | 9 | 10 | 11 | 12 | 13 | 14 | 15 | 16 | 17 | 18 | FW1 | FW2 | FW3 | GF |
|---|---|---|---|---|---|---|---|---|---|---|---|---|---|---|---|---|---|---|---|---|---|---|
| Blackfriars OS | ELI -14 | ROS +5 | TOS -9 | HD +11 | GAZ -118 | IF +82 | PH -1 | OSBL +13 | X | ELI +39 | ROS -26 | TOS +22 | HD -5 | GAZ -109 | **IF** | PH | OSBL | X | | | | |
| Elizabeth | BOS +14 | PH -44 | X | OSBL +30 | IF +148 | ROS +48 | TOS +1 | GAZ +12 | HD +73 | BOS -39 | PH -18 | X | OSBL -42 | IF +108 | ROS | **TOS** | **GAZ** | HD | | | | |
| Gaza | ROS +115 | TOS +107 | HD +36 | IF +150 | BOS +118 | PH +90 | X | ELI -12 | OSBL +25 | ROS +122 | TOS +40 | HD +26 | IF +171 | BOS +109 | **PH** | X | ELI | **OSBL** | | | | |
| Houghton Districts | TOS +1 | IF +161 | GAZ -36 | BOS -11 | PH +29 | X | OSBL +34 | ROS -7 | ELI -73 | TOS -9 | IF +145 | GAZ -26 | BOS +5 | PH -8 | X | OSBL | ROS | **ELI** | | | | |
| Ingle Farm | X | HD -161 | OSBL -106 | GAZ -150 | ELI -148 | BOS -82 | ROS -92 | TOS -92 | PH -22 | X | HD -145 | OSBL -44 | GAZ -171 | ELI -108 | BOS | **ROS** | **TOS** | PH | | | | |
| O'Sullivan Beach/Lonsdale | PH +21 | X | IF +106 | ELI -30 | ROS -22 | TOS +12 | HD -34 | BOS -13 | GAZ -25 | PH -57 | X | IF +44 | ELI +42 | ROS +73 | TOS | **HD** | **BOS** | GAZ | | | | |
| Para Hills | OSBL -21 | ELI +44 | ROS -6 | TOS +40 | HD -29 | GAZ -90 | BOS +1 | X | IF +22 | OSBL +57 | ELI +18 | ROS +39 | TOS -77 | HD +8 | GAZ | **BOS** | X | **IF** | | | | |
| Rosewater | GAZ -115 | BOS -5 | PH +6 | X | OSBL +22 | ELI -48 | IF +92 | HD +7 | TOS -5 | GAZ -122 | BOS +26 | PH -39 | X | OSBL -73 | **ELI** | IF | **HD** | TOS | | | | |
| Trinity OS | HD -1 | GAZ -107 | BOS +9 | PH -40 | X | OSBL -12 | ELI -1 | IF +92 | ROS +5 | HD +9 | GAZ -40 | BOS -22 | PH +77 | X | **OSBL** | ELI | IF | **ROS** | | | | |

| Team | Pld | W | L | D | PF | PA | PP | Pts |
|---|---|---|---|---|---|---|---|---|
| Gaza | 13 | 12 | 1 | 0 | 1619 | 522 | 75.61 | 24 |
| Elizabeth | 12 | 8 | 4 | 0 | 1215 | 924 | 56.80 | 16 |
| Para Hills | 13 | 8 | 5 | 0 | 1079 | 1073 | 50.13 | 16 |
| Houghton Districts | 13 | 6 | 7 | 0 | 1158 | 953 | 54.85 | 12 |
| O'Sullivan Beach Lonsdale | 12 | 6 | 6 | 0 | 999 | 882 | 53.11 | 12 |
| Blackfriars OS | 13 | 6 | 7 | 0 | 1035 | 1145 | 47.47 | 12 |
| Trinity OS | 12 | 5 | 7 | 0 | 953 | 984 | 49.19 | 10 |
| Rosewater | 12 | 5 | 7 | 0 | 837 | 1091 | 43.41 | 10 |
| Ingle Farm | 12 | 0 | 12 | 0 | 393 | 1714 | 18.65 | 0 |

Ladder and Win-Loss correct as 28/07/2026 PlayHQ

== Division 7 ==
=== Seniors ===
| Team | Home-and-away season | | | | | | | | | | | | | | | | | | Finals series | | | |
| Team | 1 | 2 | 3 | 4 | 5 | 6 | 7 | 8 | 9 | 10 | 11 | 12 | 13 | 14 | 15 | 16 | 17 | 18 | FW1 | FW2 | FW3 | GF |
|---|---|---|---|---|---|---|---|---|---|---|---|---|---|---|---|---|---|---|---|---|---|---|
| Adelaide Lutheran | MP +87 | FLI +83 | WC +116 | HAC +16 | SMI +217 | CEN +36 | BL -5 | MP +24 | FLI +101 | WC +19 | HAC +37 | SMI +99 | CEN +89 | BL +63 | X | **CEN** | **MP** | HAC | | | | |
| Brahma Lodge | FLI +31 | WC -49 | HAC -17 | SMI +64 | CEN +20 | MP -65 | BL +5 | FLI +44 | WC -55 | HAC +8 | SMI +37 | CEN -15 | MP +49 | AL -63 | SMI | **WC** | **FLI** | X | | | | |
| Central United | HAC +19 | MP +32 | SMI +90 | FLI +48 | BL -20 | AL -36 | WC +44 | HAC +13 | MP -26 | SMI +90 | FLI +73 | BL +15 | AL -89 | WC -29 | X | AL | **HAC** | **MP** | | | | |
| Flinders University | BL -31 | AL -83 | MP -70 | CEN -48 | WC +15 | SMI +140 | HAC -2 | BL -44 | AL -101 | MP -51 | CEN -73 | WC +8 | SMI +41 | HAC -16 | X | **SMI** | BL | WC | | | | |
| Hackham | CEN -19 | SMI +67 | BL +17 | AL -16 | MP +15 | WC +17 | FLI +2 | CEN -13 | SMI +50 | BL -8 | AL -37 | MP +11 | WC +62 | FLI +16 | X | MP | CEN | **AL** | | | | |
| Mitchell Park | AL -87 | CEN -32 | FLI +70 | WC -24 | HAC +15 | BL +65 | SMI +63 | AL -24 | CEN +26 | FLI +51 | WC +35 | HAC -11 | BL -49 | SMI +86 | X | **HAC** | AL | CEN | | | | |
| Smithfield | WC -93 | HAC -67 | CEN -90 | BL -64 | AL -217 | FLI -140 | MP -63 | WC +32 | HAC -50 | CEN -90 | BL -37 | AL -99 | FLI -41 | MP -86 | **BL** | FLI | WC | X | | | | |
| West Croydon | SMI +93 | BL +49 | AL -116 | MP +24 | FLI -15 | HAC -17 | CEN -44 | SMI -32 | BL +55 | AL -19 | MP -35 | FLI -8 | HAC -62 | CEN +29 | X | BL | **SMI** | **FLI** | | | | |

| Team | Pld | W | L | D | PF | PA | PP | Pts |
|---|---|---|---|---|---|---|---|---|
| Adelaide Lutheran | 14 | 13 | 1 | 0 | 1640 | 658 | 71.36 | 26 |
| Central United | 14 | 9 | 5 | 0 | 1245 | 1021 | 54.94 | 18 |
| Mitchell Park | 14 | 8 | 6 | 0 | 1074 | 890 | 54.68 | 16 |
| Hackham | 14 | 8 | 6 | 0 | 1069 | 935 | 53.34 | 16 |
| Brahma Lodge | 14 | 8 | 6 | 0 | 1029 | 1035 | 49.85 | 16 |
| West Croydon | 14 | 5 | 9 | 0 | 1097 | 1195 | 47.86 | 10 |
| Flinders University | 14 | 4 | 10 | 0 | 905 | 1220 | 42.58 | 8 |
| Smithfield | 14 | 1 | 13 | 0 | 589 | 1694 | 25.79 | 2 |

Ladder and Win-Loss correct as 28/07/2026 PlayHQ

== Representative Matches ==
=== Men ===
6 June (4:00 pm) | **ADFL** | def. | Big V | Norwood Oval
4.8 (32); 8.10 (58); 14.13 (90); 19.15 (129) | **Q1; Q2; Q3; Final** | 2.2 (14); 4.6 (30); 6.8 (44); 8.10 (58) | Umpires: Field: A. Crosby, F. Manikas, J. Collopy Boundary: B. Heritage, D. Milne, P. PcMullen, A. Roberts Goal: S. Martin, C. Ray
Lachlan Pascoe 5, Sam Gray 2, Joshua Glenn 2, Mitchell Grigg 2, Finn Wakelin 2, Andrew Bradley, Jake Pitman, Beau Baldwin, Abaina Davis, Dylan Farquhar, Christopher Olsson | **Goals** | Felix Flockart 2, Will Clark, Charlie Cotter, Ben Huggard, Charlie MacIsaac, Hugo McGlashan, Sam Tucker
Mitchell Grigg, Malachy Carruthers, Joshua Glenn, Clayton Symonds, Craig Pitt, Finn Wakelin | **Best** | Felix Flockart, Mitchell Hughes, Charlie Cormack, Ben Huggard, Campbell Moorfield, Charlie Cotter

=== Women ===
6 June (2:00 pm) | ADFL | def. by | **Big V** | Norwood Oval
0.0 (0); 0.3 (3); 1.3 (9); 1.3 (9) | **Q1; Q2; Q3; Final** | 5.3 (33); 7.5 (47); 7.9 (51); 10.12 (72) | Umpires: Field: M. Harris, P. Smith, A. O'Meara, Boundary: L. Gluyas, B. Loffler, G. Porcaro, J. Thomas Goal: D. Harrold, J. Owen
Jorja Hooper | **Goals** | Jordan Mifsud 3, Renee Saulitis 2, Sarah Cameron, Rosie Finster, Olivia Rundle, Taylah Watson
Grace Whittaker, Caitlen Teague, brooklyn mciver, Amy Jones, Abbey Scheer | **Best** | Jacinta Baxter, Jordan Mifsud, Taylah Watson, Jaime Nelson, Rosie Finster, Olivia Brilliant
