= South Australian Football Association (1978–1995) =

Australian football league

The South Australian Football Association (SAFA) was a semi-professional Australian rules football competition based in Adelaide, South Australia that ran from 1978 to the end of the 1995 season.

== Clubs ==
=== Final ===
Club	Colours	Nickname	Home Ground	Former League	Est.	Years in SAFA	SAFA Senior Premierships		Fate
Club	Colours	Nickname	Home Ground	Former League	Est.	Years in SAFA	Total	Years	Fate
Adelaide Tigers		Tigers	Kings Reserve, Torrensville	–	1993	1993–1995	0	-	Merged with TransAdelaide to form TransAdelaide Tigers in SAAFL in 1996
Athelstone		Raggies	Max Amber Sportfield, Paradise	NNFA	1904	1978–1995	1	1995	Moved to South Australian Amateur FL in 1996
Edwardstown	(1980s) (1990s)	Towns	Edwardstown Oval, Edwardstown	SMFL	1919	1978–1995	4	1980, 1982, 1987, 1988	Moved to South Australian Amateur FL in 1996
Flinders Park		Reds	Flinders Park Oval, Flinders Park	SAAFL	1927	1978–1995	4	1978, 1979, 1981, 1983	Returned to South Australian Amateur FL in 1996
Payneham Norwood Union		Falcons	Payneham Oval, Payneham	–	1995	1995	0	-	Moved to South Australian Amateur FL in 1996
Plympton		Bulldogs	Plympton Oval, Plympton Park	SFL	1937	1990–1995	0	-	Moved to South Australian Amateur FL in 1996
Pooraka		Bulls	Lindblom Park, Pooraka	NNFA	1920	1978–1995	6	1984, 1985, 1989, 1990, 1991, 1994	Moved to South Australian Amateur FL in 1996
Salisbury North		Hawks	Salisbury North Oval, Salisbury North	NMFL	1953	1979-1988, 1992–1995	0	-	Played in Northern Metropolitan FL between 1989-91. Moved to South Australian Amateur FL in 1996
Salisbury West		Tigers	Salisbury Downs Oval, Salisbury Downs	NMFL	1965	1995	0	-	Moved to South Australian Amateur FL in 1996

=== Former ===
Club	Colours	Nickname	Home Ground	Former League	Est.	Years in SAFA	SAFA Senior Premierships		Fate
Club	Colours	Nickname	Home Ground	Former League	Est.	Years in SAFA	Total	Years	Fate
Brighton		Tigers	Brighton Oval, Brighton	SMFL	1885	1987–1990	0	-	Merged with Brighton High OS to form Brighton Districts and Old Scholars in SAAFL in 1991
Burnside			Bill Cooper Oval, Newland Park, Erindale	NNFA		1978	0	-	Merged with Kensington Gardens to form Burnside-Kensington in 1979
Burnside-Kensington			Bill Cooper Oval, Newland Park, Erindale	–	1979	1979–1980	0	-	Moved to SAAFL in 1980
Campbelltown-Magill (Campbelltown-Magill United 1978)			Campbelltown Memorial Oval, Paradise	NNFA	1976	1978-1979	0	-	Moved to Northern Metropolitan FL in 1980
Elizabeth		Eagles	Elizabeth Oval, Elizabeth	CDFA	1956	1978–1988	0	-	Moved to SAAFL in 1989
Ferryden Park		Lions	Ferryden Park Reserve, Ferryden Park	SAAFL	1964	1978–1984	0	-	Returned to SAAFL in 1980
Flagstaff Hill (Brighton Tigers 1978)	(1978)(1979-84)	Bushpigs	Flagstaff Hill Recreation Ground, Flagstaff Hill	UCFA	1963	1978-1984	0	-	Moved to Southern FL in 1985
Gepps Cross		Rams	Duncan Fraser Reserve, Northfield	NNFA	1952	1978–1983	0	-	Moved to SAAFL in 1984
Henley District and Old Scholars		Sharks	Henley Memorial Oval, Henley Beach	SAAFL	1978	1982–1993	2	1992, 1993	Merged with Greek to form Henley Greek in SAAFL in 1994
Happy Valley		Vikings	Happy Valley Sports Park, Aberfoyle Park	SMFL	1951	1978–1979	0	-	Moved to Southern FL in 1980
Hope Valley		Demons	Hope Valley Sporting Club, Hope Valley	NNFA	1906	1978–1979	0	-	Moved to Northern Metropolitan FL in 1980
Ingle Farm		Bulldogs	Rowe Park, Ingle Farm	NNFA	1968	1978–1988	0	-	Moved to SAAFL in 1989
Marion		Rams	Marion Oval, Marion	SMFL	1891	1978–1986	0	-	Moved to Southern FL in 1987
Mitchell Park		Lions	Mitchell Park Oval, Mitchell Park	SMFL	1969	1987–1993	0	-	Moved to Southern FL in 1994
Modbury		Hawks	Modbury Oval, Ridgehaven	NNFA	1862	1978–1987	0	-	Moved to SAAFL in 1988
Morphettville Park		Roos	Kellett Reserve Oval, Morphettville	SMFL	1958	1978-1986	0	-	Moved to Southern FL in 1987
Mount Lofty District		Mountain Devils	Heathfield Oval, Heathfield	–	1978	1979–1985	0	-	Moved to Hills FL in 1986
Norwood Districts (Hectorville 1978-81)	(1978-82)(1983-85)(1986-89)	Hounds	Daly Oval, Hectorville	NNFA	1961	1978-1989	0	-	Moved to SAAFL in 1990
Norwood Union			Brookway Park, Campbelltown	NNFA	1902	1978	0	-	Moved to Glenelg-South Adelaide FA in 1979
Para Hills		Big Reds	The Paddocks, Para Hills West	NMFL	1974	1992–1994	0	-	Moved to SAAFL in 1995
Payneham	(1980-81)(1982-85, 1993-95)(1986-92)		Payneham Oval, Payneham	SAAFL	1901	1980–1994	1	1986	Merged with Norwood Union to form Payneham Norwood Union following 1994 season
Port District		Ditters	Largs Reserve, Largs Bay	–	1979	1979–1983	0	-	Moved to SAAFL in 1984
Tea Tree Gully	(1978-86)(1987)	Gullies, Wolves	Pertaringa Oval, Banksia Park	NNFA	1862	1978–1987	0	-	Moved to SAAFL in 1988
Walkerville		Cats	Walkerville Oval, Walkerville	SAAFL	1901	1980–1989	0	-	Returned to SAAFL in 1990
West Lakes	(1975-85)(1986-87)	Lakers	Jubilee Reserve, West Lakes Shore	SAAFL	1930	1975-1987	0	-	Returned to SAAFL in 1988

== Premierships ==
=== A1 (John Stevens Perpetual Trophy) ===
- 1978 Flinders Park
- 1979 Flinders Park
- 1980 Edwardstown
- 1981 Flinders Park
- 1982 Edwardstown
- 1983 Flinders Park
- 1984 Pooraka
- 1985 Pooraka
- 1986 Payneham
- 1987 Edwardstown
- 1988 Edwardstown
- 1989 Pooraka
- 1990 Pooraka
- 1991 Pooraka
- 1992 Henley District and Old Scholars
- 1993 Henley District and Old Scholars
- 1994 Pooraka
- 1995 Athelstone

=== A2 ===
- 1978 Modbury
- 1979 Port District
- 1980 Payneham
- 1981 Mount Lofty District
- 1982 Gepps Cross
- 1983 Henley District and Old Scholars
- 1984 Ingle Farm
- 1985 Modbury
- 1986 Elizabeth
- 1987 Norwood Districts
- 1988
- 1989
- 1990
- 1991
- 1992
- 1993
- 1994 Edwardstown
- 1995 Athelstone

=== A3 ===
- 1978 Edwardstown
- 1979 Edwardstown
- 1980 Edwardstown
- 1981 Edwardstown
- 1982 Edwardstown
- 1983 Flinders Park
- 1984 Edwardstown
- 1985 Flinders Park
- 1986 Flinders Park
- 1987 Henley District and Old Scholars
- 1988 Mitchell Park
- 1989 Brighton
- 1990 Mitchell Park
- 1991 Edwardstown
- 1992 Para Hills
- 1993 Henley District and Old Scholars
- 1994 Pooraka
- 1995 Athelstone

=== A4 ===
- 1978 Athelstone
- 1979 Athelstone
- 1980 Walkerville
- 1981 Athelstone
- 1982 Athelstone
- 1983 Flinders Park
- 1984 Henley District and Old Scholars
- 1985 Elizabeth
- 1986 Elizabeth
- 1987 Henley District and Old Scholars
- 1988 Walkerville
- 1989 Edwardstown
- 1990 Plympton
- 1991 Edwardstown
- 1992 Salisbury North
- 1993 Athelstone
- 1994 Plympton
- 1995 Athelstone

== Medallists ==
=== A1 - Harford Medal ===
- 1980 - Peter Munn (Ferryden Park)
- 1982 - John Eldridge (Ferryden Park)
- 1983 - Peter Munn (Ferryden Park)
- 1985 - Peter King (Athelstone)
- 1986 - Adrian Rocco (Athelstone)
- 1987 - Tim Valente (Athelstone)
- 1988 - Randall Wright (Brighton)
- 1989 - Gary Simpson (Pooraka)
- 1991 - Andrew Horsnell (Henley District and Old Scholars)
- 1992 - Matthew Wormald (Henley District and Old Scholars)
- 1993 - Errol Surman (Athelstone)
- 1994 - Chris Grigg (Athelstone)

=== A2 - Ardill Medal ===
- 1983 - Ian Berry (Henley District and Old Scholars)

=== Figallo Medal ===
Awarded for Best on Ground in an A1 Grand Final

- 1989 - Barclay Mathews (Pooraka)
- 1990 - Gary Simpson (Pooraka)
- 1991 - Gary Simpson (Pooraka)
