= Adelaide Metropolitan Football League =

Australian rules football competition

The Adelaide Metropolitan Football League (AMFL) was an Australian rules football competition based mainly in the eastern and south-eastern suburbs of Adelaide, South Australia. Originally known as the Sturt District Football Association (SDFA), the competition reformed after World War II, became the Adelaide Metropolitan Football League in 1963 and folded at the end of the 1967 season.

== Member Clubs ==
=== Final ===
Club	Colours	Nickname	Home Ground	Former League	Est.	Years in AMFL	AMFL Senior Premierships		Fate
Club	Colours	Nickname	Home Ground	Former League	Est.	Years in AMFL	Known	Years	Fate
Albert Druids		Druids	Mary Lee Park, North Adelaide	WTDFA	1930s	1962-1967	0	?	Moved to Norwood North FA in 1968
Burnside			Bill Cooper Oval, Newland Park, Erindale	ETFA	1947	1961-1967	0	?	Moved to East Torrens FA in 1968
Eastwood (Eastwood Rechabite 1946-48)			Carriageway Park (Park 17), Adelaide	SAAFL	1930s	1946-1953, 1964-1967	4	1946, 1947, 1948, 1951	Moved to East Torrens FA in 1954 and 1968.
Hindmarsh CYMS			St Michael's College, Henley Beach	CYMSFA		1964-1967	1	1967	Moved to SAAFL in 1968
Kelvinator			Weigall Oval, North Plympton	SMFL	1943	1951, 1962-1967	0	?	Folded when AMFL ended in 1967
Mitcham District		Hawks	Price Memorial Oval, Hawthorn	MSFA	1908	1947-1967	4	1954, 1956, 1959, 1960	Moved to SAAFL in 1968
Royal Park		Roosters	Carnegie South Reserve, Royal Park	NADFA	1960s	1967	0	?	Moved to SAAFL in 1968
St Raphael's		Saints	Morgan Oval, Adelaide	–	1946	1946-1967	0	?	Moved to North Adelaide District FA in 1968
South Adelaide Ramblers		Panthers	Blue Gum Park, Adelaide	SMFL	1910s	1949, 1958-1967	0	?	Moved to Southern Metropolitan FL in 1968

=== Former ===
Club	Colours	Nickname	Home Ground	Former League	Est.	Years in AMFL	AMFL Senior Premierships		Fate
Club	Colours	Nickname	Home Ground	Former League	Est.	Years in AMFL	Known	Years	Fate
Adelaide Colts						1951-1952	Junior grades only		Folded
Blackwood		Woods	Hewett Sports Ground Blackwood	GDFA	1912	1949-1952	2	1950, 1952	Returned to Glenelg District FA in 1953
Brompton			Mary Lee Park, North Adelaide		1945	1962-1966	0	?	Moved to East Torrens FA in 1967
Camden Park							0	?	Folded
Colonel Light Gardens B			Mortlock Park, Colonel Light Gardens	–	1931	1946-1953	0	-	Moved to SAAFL in 1954
Cudmore Park						1953-1954	0	-	Folded
Goodwood B			Goodwood Oval, Goodwood		1920s	1947	0	-	Moved to SAAFL in 1948
Kenilworth B		Kookaburras			1907	1948-1952	0	-	Moved to SAAFL in 1954
Lockleys Youth Club						1951	Junior grades only		Folded
Mitcham Youth Movement						1946	0	-	Folded
Myer (Myer Emporium 1948)						1948-1952	0	-	Moved to SAAFL in 1953
North Adelaide Junior						1951	Junior grades only		Folded
Parkside Youth Movement						1946-1952	0	-	Folded
Parkview						1947-1951	0	-	Folded
Postal Institute					1944	1953-1965	0	?	Returned to SAAFL in 1955
Sturt C		Double Blues			1901	1946-1953	2	1949, 1953	?
Sturt Park						1953-1954, 1964	0	-	Folded
University		Blacks			1906	1953-1954	0	-	Moved to SAAFL in 1955
Woodville						1964	0	-	

== Premierships ==
=== Sturt District Football Association ===
Year	A Division	B Division
1946	Eastwood Rechabites	
1947	Eastwood Rechabites	
1948	Eastwood Rechabites	Mitcham District B
1949	Sturt C	South Adelaide Ramblers
1950	Blackwood	Kenilworth B
1951	Eastwood	St Raphael's
1952	Blackwood	Kenilworth
1953	Sturt C	
1954	Mitcham District	
1955		
1956	Mitcham District	
1957		
1958		
1959	Mitcham District	
1960	Mitcham District	
1961		
1962		

=== Adelaide Metropolitan Football League ===
Year	A Division	B Division
1963		
1964		
1965		
1966		
1967	Hindmarsh C.Y.M.S	

== Medallists ==
=== H. S. Dunks Medal ===
- 1946 - Gerke, Harders, Thomas and May (Tie)
- 1947 - William Maxwell May (Camden Park)
- 1948
- 1949
- 1950
- 1951 - Colin Hender (Blackwood)
- 1952 - George Southby (Blackwood)
- 1953 - George Southby (Blackwood)
- 1954
- 1955
- 1956
- 1957
- 1958
- 1959
- 1960
- 1961
- 1962
- 1963
- 1964
- 1965
- 1966
- 1967
