= Keith Dunn (footballer) =

Australian rules footballer

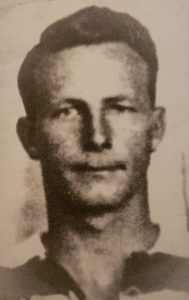

Personal information
- Full name: William Keith Dunn
- Born: 10 July 1906; Glenelg, South Australia
- Died: 29 May 1962 (aged 55); Lower Mitcham, South Australia
- Original teams: Edwardstown & Colonel Light Gardens
- Height: 184 cm (6 ft 0 in)
- Weight: 82 kg (181 lb)

Playing career^{1}
Years	Club	Games (Goals)
1927–1933	Sturt (SANFL)	74 (13)
1934–1937	Carlton	38 (33)

Representative team honours
Years	Team	Games (Goals)
	South Australia	3
- ^{1} Playing statistics correct to the end of 1937.

William Keith Dunn (10 July 1906 – 29 May 1962) was an Australian rules footballer who played with Sturt in the SANFL and Carlton in the VFL.

A ruckman, Dunn made his debut for Sturt in 1927 and went on to play 74 games for the club. In 1933, his last SANFL season, he won both the Magarey Medal and his club's best and fairest award. The following season he moved to Victoria and spent four years with Carlton. Over the course of his career he represented the South Australian interstate side on three occasions.

After retiring as a player, he coached Mentone before enlisting in the Army. He then returned to Adelaide and ran a wholesale milk business at Colonel Light Gardens.
