= Southern Metropolitan Football League =

The Southern Metropolitan Football League (SMFL) was an Australian rules football competition based in the southern suburbs of Adelaide, South Australia until it folded at the end of the 1986 season. It first formed in 1912 as the Sturt Football Association, and during its history was also known as the Mid-Southern Football Association (1920-1930), Glenelg District Football Association (1931–1949), Glenelg-South-West District Football Association (1950–1966) and Glenelg-South Adelaide Football Association (1967–1983), before finally being named Southern Metropolitan Football League (1984–1986).

The association first affiliated with the South Australian Football League in 1921. In 1927, the association made a special request to the SAFL for financial assistance.

== Final Clubs ==
| Club | Colours | Nickname | Home Ground | Former league | Est. | Years in SMFL | SMFL Senior Premierships | | Fate |
| Club | Colours | Nickname | Home Ground | Former league | Est. | Years in SMFL | Total | Most recent | Fate |
|---|---|---|---|---|---|---|---|---|---|
| Blackwood | | Woods | Blackwood Hill Reserve, Blackwood | AMFL | 1912 | 1912-1915, 1919-1941, 1944-1948, 1953-1986 | 7 | 1980 | Played in Adelaide Metropolitan FL between 1949-52. Joined Hills FL in 1987 |
| Brighton (Brighton and Seacliff 1938-56) | (1912-57)(1969-70)(1971-90) | Tigers | Brighton Oval, Brighton | SAAFL | 1885 | 1912-1913, 1919-1941, 1946-1957, 1969-1986 | 13 | 1986 | Played in SAAFL between 1958-68. Joined South Australian FA in 1987 |
| Camden (Novar Gardens 1929-31) | (1929-48)(1949)(1950-69)(1970-86) | | Camden Oval, Novar Gardens | – | 1929 | 1929-1986 | 6 | 1976 | Merged with Greek to form Greek Camden in South Australian Amateur FL in 1987 |
| Marion (Sturt 1920-56) | | Rams | Marion Oval, Marion | – | 1891 | 1912-1915, 1920-1941, 1946-1986 | 7 | 1967 | Joined Southern FL in 1987 |
| Mitchell Park | | Lions | Mitchell Park Oval, Mitchell Park | – | 1969 | 1969-1985 | 3 | 1984 | Joined South Australian FA in 1987 |
| Morphettville Park | | Roos | Kellett Reserve Oval, Morphettville | – | 1958 | 1959-1986 | 1 | 1963 | Joined Southern FL in 1987 |
| Ovingham | | Cats | Cane Reserve, Prospect | SAAFL | 1906 | 1986 | 0 | - | Joined Central District FA in 1987 |
| Plympton | | Bulldogs | Plympton Oval, Plympton Park | – | 1937 | 1937-1986 | 7 | 1985 | Joined Southern FL in 1987 |

== Former Clubs ==
| Club | Colours | Nickname | Home Ground | Former league | Est. | Years in SMFL | SMFL Senior Premierships | | Fate |
| Club | Colours | Nickname | Home Ground | Former league | Est. | Years in SMFL | Total | Most recent | Fate |
|---|---|---|---|---|---|---|---|---|---|
| Adelaide Lutheran | (1980-82)(1983-84) | Bulldogs | Daws Road High School, Pasadena | ASFL | 1969 | 1980-1984 | 0 | - | Moved to South Australian Amateur FL in 1985 |
| Albert Sports | | Druids | Challa Gardens Primary School, Kilkenny | ASFL | 1930s | 1979-1981 | 0 | - | Moved to South Australian Amateur FL in 1982 |
| ANZ Bank | | Roos | Park 21 (Mirnu Wirra), Adelaide | NADFA | 1958 | 1960-1980 | 2 | 1971 | Moved to South Australian Amateur FL in 1981 |
| Bank of Adelaide | | Bankers | Mortlock Park, Colonel Light Gardens | SAAFL | 1970 | 1971-1976 | 0 | - | Folded in 1977 |
| Black Forest | | Foresters | Weigall Oval, North Plympton | – | 1910s | 1919-1927, 1931-1933 | 1 | 1933 | Moved to South Australian Amateur FL in 1934 |
| Bridgewater | | | Bridgewater Oval, Bridgewater | | | 1915 | 0 | - | Moved to Hills FA in 1916 |
| Brompton | | | Sam Johnson Sportsground, Renown Park | SAAFL | 1945 | 1981-1982 | 0 | - | Merged with Albert Sports to form Renown Park in South Australian Amateur FL in 1983 |
| Brunswick | | | Park 21 (Mirnu Wirra), Adelaide | NADFA | | 1952-1953 | 0 | - | Folded |
| Clarendon | | | Clarendon Oval, Clarendon | AFA | 1905 | 1925, 1929 | 0 | - | 1930-33 unknown. Joined Southern FA in 1935 |
| College Park | | | | | | 1950-1951 | 1 | 1951 | Folded |
| Colonel Light Gardens | (1944-45)(1976-81)(1982-85) | Lions | Mortlock Park, Colonel Light Gardens | SAAFL | 1931 | 1944-1945, 1976-1985 | 1 | 1983 | Played in SAAFL between 1946-75. Merged with Kenilworth to form Kenilworth Colonel Light in South Australian Amateur FL in 1986 |
| Edwardstown | | Towns | Edwardstown Oval, South Plympton | ASFL | 1919 | 1920, 1925-1933, 1936-1977 | 15 | 1977 | 1920-25 unknown. Played in Adelaide Suburban FA in 1934-45. Formed South Australian FA in 1978 |
| Flagstaff Hill (Brighton Tigers 1978) | (1978)(1979-84) | Bushpigs | Flagstaff Oval, Flagstaff Hill | UCFA | 1963 | 1978-1984 | 0 | - | Moved to Southern FL in 1985 |
| Glandore | | Eagles | Glandore Oval, Glandore | – | 1958 | 1958-1984 | 3 | 1965 | Moved to South Australian Amateur FL in 1985 |
| Glenelg Imperial | | | | | | 1912-1915, 1923-1930, 1942-1946 | 0 | - | Folded |
| Glenelg Junior | | | | | | 1933-1934, 1936 | 1 | 1930 | Folded |
| Glenelg Rovers | | | | | | 1931-1932 | 0 | - | Folded |
| Glenelg Sailing Club (B-Grade only) | | | | | | 1928-1929 | 0 | - | Folded |
| Glenelg United | | | | | | 1929 | 0 | - | Folded |
| Glenelg YMCA | | | | | | 1946 | 0 | - | Folded |
| Goodwood | (1925-30)(1979-84) | Tigers | Goodwood Oval, Millswood | SAAFL | 1920s | 1925-1930, 1979-1984 | 2 | 1930 | Moved to SAAFL in 1931. Merged with St Raphael's to form Goodwood Saints in South Australian Amateur FL in 1985 |
| Happy Valley | | Vikings | Happy Valley Oval, Aberfoyle Park | HCFA | 1952 | 1964-1979 | 2 | 1974 | Moved to Southern FL in 1980 |
| Happy Valley (1) | | | | | | 1924 | 0 | - | ? |
| Immanuel OS | | Double Blues | Immanuel College, Novar Gardens | UCFA | 1977 | 1978-1979 | 0 | - | Moved to South Australian Amateur FL in 1980 |
| Kelvinator | | | Weigall Oval, North Plympton | SAAFL | 1943 | 1950, 1953-1961 | 1 | 1950 | Played in Adelaide Metropolitan FL in 1951-52, returned there in 1962 |
| Lockleys | | Demons | Lockleys Oval, Lockleys | WTDFA | 1951 | 1960-1985 | 3 | 1982 | Moved to South Australian Amateur FL in 1986 |
| Mitcham | (1912-13)(1914-24)(1976-84) | Hawks | Price Memorial Oval, Hawthorn | NADFA, SAAFL | 1908 | 1912-1915, 1922-1924, 1976-1984 | 5 | 1984 | Moved to Patriotic FL in 1918. Entered recess in 1925, re-formed in Sturt District FA in 1947. Returned to South Australian Amateur FL in 1985 |
| Mitcham Park | | | | | | 1915 | 0 | - | Folded |
| Mortlock Park | | | Mortlock Park, Colonel Light Gardens | – | 1927 | 1927-1930 | 2 | 1929 | Merged with Colonel Light Western to form Colonel Light Gardens in 1931 |
| North Brighton-Somerton | | | Brighton Secondary College, North Brighton | – | 1950 | 1950-1951 | 0 | - | Moved to South Australian Amateur FL in 1952 |
| Norwood Union | | | Brookway Park, Campbelltown | SAFA | 1902 | 1979-1982 | 0 | - | Moved to South Australian Amateur FL in 1983 |
| Plympton (1) | | | | – | 1921 | 1921-1927 | 0 | - | Folded after 1927 season |
| Port Noarlunga | | | Port Noarlunga Community Sports Complex, Port Noarlunga South | – | 1935 | 1935-1937 | 0 | - | In recess between 1938-46. Re-formed in Southern FA in 1947 |
| Public Service | | | | | | 1948 | 0 | - | Folded |
| Reynella | | Wineflies | Reynella Oval, Old Reynella | – | 1919 | 1920-1927, 1930-1947 | 0 | - | Returned to Southern FL in 1948 |
| Richmond and Keswick United | | | Corner Bickford Street & Marion Road, Richmond | | | 1928-1930 | 1 | 1928 | Folded |
| Salesian | | Violet Crumbles | Salesian College, Brooklyn Park | SAAFL | 1969 | 1980-1984 | 0 | - | Returned to South Australian Amateur FL in 1985 |
| Seacliff | | | John Mathwin Reserve, Seacliff | – | 1931 | 1931-1935 | 0 | - | In recess 1936-37. Merged with Brighton to form Brighton and Seacliff in 1938 |
| Semaphore Seasiders | | Seasiders | | | | 1915 | 0 | - | Folded |
| South Adelaide Ramblers (South Adelaide C 1953-55) | | Ramblers, Panthers | Blue Gum Park, Adelaide | SDFA | 1910s | 1950-1957, 1968 | 0 | - | Returned to Sturt District FA in 1958. Moved to Norwood-North FA in 1969 |
| St Leonards | | | Wigley Reserve, Glenelg North | | | 1930-1963 | 2 | 1935 | Folded |
| St Leonards Colts | | | | | | 1935-1938 | 1 | 1935 | Folded |
| St Peters | | | | | | 1929 | 0 | - | Folded |
| South Road Estate (B-Grade only) | | | St Marys Park, St Marys | | | 1929 | 0 | - | Folded |
| Sturt-Brighton | | | Sturt Oval, Marion, Brighton Oval, Brighton | | | 1942-1945 | 2 | 1945 | De-merged back into Sturt and Brighton in 1946 |
| Sturt Centrals | | | | | | 1916 | 1 | 1916 | Folded |
| Sturt CAE | | Teachers | Sturt College of Advanced Education, Bedford Park | SAAFL | 1972 | 1981 | 0 | - | Absorbed by Flinders University in 1982 |
| Sturt Imperial | | | | | | 1915 | 0 | - | Folded |
| Sturt Ramblers | | | | | | 1912-1915 | 2 | 1915 | Folded |
| Torrens CAE | | | Gladys Elphick Park (Park 25), Adelaide | SAAFL | 1962 | 1975-1978 | 0 | - | Folded in 1979 |
| Torrensville United | | | | | | 1962-1978 | 0 | - | Absorbed by Lockleys in 1979 |
| Underdale United | | | West Park, Adelaide | WTDFA | 1919 | 1927 | 0 | - | Moved to South Australian Amateur FL in 1928 |
| West Suburban | | | | | | 1930 | 0 | - | Folded |
| Wingfield Royals | | Royals, Wolves, Wingies | Eastern Parade Reserve, Ottoway | ASFL | 1954 | 1979-1981 | 0 | - | Moved to South Australian Amateur FL in 1982 |
| Woodville South (Kilkenny United 1962-70) | (1962-64)(1965-78) | Cats | Ledger Reserve, Woodville South | WDFA | 1890 | 1962-1978 | 2 | 1976 | Moved to South Australian Amateur FL in 1979 |

== Premierships ==
=== Sturt Football Association ===
| Year | A-Grade |
|---|---|
| 1912 | Mitcham Undefeated |
| 1913 | Sturt Ramblers |
| 1914 | Mitcham |
| 1915 | Sturt Ramblers |
| 1916 | Sturt Centrals |
| 1917 | In recess (World War I) |
| 1918 | In recess (World War I) |
| 1919 | Brighton |

=== Mid-Southern Football Association ===
| Year | A-Grade | B-Grade |
|---|---|---|
| 1920 | Brighton | |
| 1921 | Sturt | |
| 1922 | Mitcham | |
| 1923 | Brighton | |
| 1924 | Brighton | Brighton B |
| 1925 | Brighton | Goodwood B |
| 1926 | Sturt | Goodwood B |
| 1927 | Mortlock Park | Mortlock Park B |
| 1928 | Goodwood | Richmond and Keswick United |
| 1929 | Mortlock Park | |
| 1930 | Goodwood | Glenelg Juniors |

=== Glenelg District Football Association ===
| Year | A-Grade | B-Grade |
|---|---|---|
| 1931 | Sturt | |
| 1932 | Edwardstown | Edwardstown B |
| 1933 | Black Forest | St Leonards B |
| 1934 | St Leonards Undefeated | |
| 1935 | St Leonards | St Leonards Colts |
| 1936 | Brighton | Reynella |
| 1937 | Camden | |
| 1938 | Blackwood | |
| 1939 | Edwardstown | |
| 1940 | Edwardstown | |
| 1941 | Edwardstown | |
| 1942 | Edwardstown | |
| 1943 | Edwardstown | |
| 1944 | Sturt-Brighton | |
| 1945 | Sturt-Brighton | |
| 1946 | Edwardstown | |
| 1947 | Brighton and Seacliff | |
| 1948 | Edwardstown | |
| 1949 | Edwardstown | Plympton B |

=== Glenelg-South-West District Football Association ===
| Year | A1 | A2 | A3 |
|---|---|---|---|
| 1950 | Plympton | Kelvinator | |
| 1951 | Sturt | College Park | |
| 1952 | Edwardstown | Edwardstown | |
| 1953 | Blackwood | | |
| 1954 | Blackwood | | |
| 1955 | Blackwood | | |
| 1956 | Plympton | | |
| 1957 | Brighton | Marion | |
| 1958 | Marion | | |
| 1959 | Camden | | |
| 1960 | Edwardstown | | |
| 1961 | Glandore | | |
| 1962 | Edwardstown | | |
| 1963 | Glandore | Morphettville Park | |
| 1964 | Plympton | | |
| 1965 | Glandore | Lockleys | |
| 1966 | Edwardstown | Kilkenny United | Morphettville Park |

=== Glenelg-South Adelaide Football Association ===
| Year | A1 | A2 | A3 | A4 | A5 |
|---|---|---|---|---|---|
| 1967 | Plympton | Marion Undefeated | | | |
| 1968 | Glenelg Tigers | Torrensville United | | | |
| 1969 | Blackwood | Morphettville Park | Edwardstown | | |
| 1970 | Brighton | Mitchell Park | Happy Valley | Edwardstown | |
| 1971 | ANZ Bank | ANZ Bank | Plympton | Edwardstown | |
| 1972 | Camden | Camden | Morphettville Park | Edwardstown | |
| 1973 | Edwardstown | ANZ Bank | Bank of NSW | Brighton | Morphettville Park |
| 1974 | Camden | Lockleys | Happy Valley | Camden | Edwardstown |
| 1975 | Camden | | Edwardstown | Edwardstown | |
| 1976 | Camden | Blackwood | Woodville South Undefeated | Morphettville Park | |
| 1977 | Edwardstown | Mitcham | Morphettville Park | | |
| 1978 | Brighton | Goodwood | Lockleys | | |
| 1979 | Plympton | | | | |
| 1980 | Blackwood | Mitchell Park Undefeated | Morphettville Park | | |
| 1981 | Plympton | | | Morphettville Park | |
| 1982 | Brighton | Lockleys | | | |
| 1983 | Brighton | Colonel Light Gardens | Marion Undefeated | | |

=== Southern Metropolitan Football League ===
| Year | A1 | A2 | A3 |
|---|---|---|---|
| 1984 | Mitchell Park | Mitcham | Mitchell Park |
| 1985 | Plympton | Mitchell Park | Mitchell Park |
| 1986 | Brighton | Colonel Light Gardens | |

== H.S. Rugless Medallists ==
The H.S. Rugless Medal was awarded to the player adjudged the Fairest and Most Brilliant in the competition. During the Sturt Football Association years (1912–19) it was known as the Thomas Medal.

=== Thomas Medal ===
- 1912
- 1913
- 1914 – Jack Rowlands (Blackwood)
- 1915
- 1916
- 1917
- 1918
- 1919

=== H.S. Rugless Medal (A1) ===
- 1920
- 1921
- 1922 – Mick Martin (Reynella)
- 1923
- 1924 – Bob Chapman (Blackwood)
- 1925 – William Hender (Blackwood)
- 1926 – Purdie (Sturt)
- 1927 – A. "Pop" Williams (Goodwood)
- 1928 – A. "Pop" Williams (Goodwood)
- 1929
- 1930
- 1931
- 1932
- 1933 – F. Whitford (Brighton) - 24 votes
- 1934
- 1935 – R. McNamara (Camden)
- 1936 – W. Egan (Sturt)
- 1937 – Clarrie Radford (Blackwood) – 40 votes
- 1938 – F. Alcock (Reynella)
- 1939 – tied C. Brown (Sturt) & N. S. Gunn (Reynella) – 34 votes
- 1940 – F. Alcock (Reynella)
- 1941 – N. Edwards (Sturt)
- 1942 – C. Brooker (Plympton)
- 1943
- 1944 – G. Cox (Sturt-Brighton)
- 1945 – K. Rohrig (Edwardstown)
- 1946 – B. Woollard (Brighton-Seacliff)
- 1947 – R. (Bob) Ryan (Reynella)
- 1948 – Mel Brock (Camden)
- 1949 – Harold Partridge (Sturt)
- 1950 – Max Chambers (Sturt)
- 1951
- 1952 – Alan Naulty (South Adelaide Ramblers)
- 1953
- 1954 – P. Partridge (Sturt)
- 1955
- 1956
- 1957
- 1958
- 1959
- 1960
- 1961
- 1962
- 1963
- 1964
- 1965
- 1966
- 1967 – Garry Bonner (Blackwood)
- 1968 – J. Cook (Marion)
- 1969 – J. Cook (Marion)
- 1970 – Ian Winton (Morphettville Park)
- 1971
- 1972
- 1973
- 1974
- 1975
- 1976 – John Cloonan (Morphettville Park)
- 1977
- 1978 – Robbie Magarey (Blackwood)
- 1979
- 1980
- 1981 – I. Hine (Marion)
- 1982 – Brad Mesecke (Morphettville Park)
- 1983 – J. Carracher (Brighton)
- 1984 – Brad Mesecke (Morphettville Park)
- 1985 – Chris Prior (Blackwood)
- 1986 – Brad Mesecke (Morphettville Park)

=== J.C. Morrow Medal (A2) ===
In 1936 the Morrow Medal was established for the fairest and most brilliant player in the then B-Grade competition.

=== Division 2 A-Grade Medal ===
- 1980 - Neil Wuttke
- 1983 - Geoff Drechsler
- 1984 - Glenn Todman

=== Division 2 B-Grade Medal ===
- 1983 - David Heard
