= 1940 SAAFL season =

1940 premiership season
- Date: 20 April - 14 September
- Premiers: A1: Exeter; A2: Walkerville
- Minor premiers: A1: Semaphore Central; A2: Walkerville
- Wooden spooners: A1: Teachers' College; A2: Combined Banks
- Best and fairest: A1 (Hone Certificate): R. Thompson (Underdale); A2 (Chambers Certificate): Ivan Hooper (Pulteney O.S.)
- Leading goalkicker: A1: Alec Kinlough (Exeter) 115 goals A2: Arthur Dawkins (Prince Alfred O.C.) 119 goals

The 1940 SAAFL season was the 26th season of the South Australian Amateur Football League (SAAFL).

The season commenced on 20 April and concluded on 14 September.

With the ongoing enlistment into the armed forces for World War II, Old Scotch Collegians and Christian Brothers O.C. did not field teams. Four clubs applied for admission to the A2 Grade; Rosewater Rovers, Kilburn, Woodville, and Payneham B. It was also decided to not play any Interstate Match because of the war. The Amateur Carnival that was due to be held in Perth was also postponed indefinitely.

Their places were taken by Woodville and Payneham B. Woodville had reformed in 1938 and had spent the previous two seasons in the Port Adelaide District Association.

The Amateur League decided to suspend their matches for the 13th July to allow its players, officials, and supporters be able to attend the S.A.N.F.L. Lightning Premiership Carnival at Adelaide Oval. The proceeds for this match to be divided between the Fighting Forces Comforts, Red Cross, Cheer-up Society, and the Adelaide Children's Hospital.

The Amateur Sports Association organized the Patriotic Sports Carnival held on 10 August at Adelaide Oval. The proceeds for the carnival divided among the Navy League, Red Cross, Cheer-up Society and Fighting Forces Comforts Fund.

== A1 ==
=== Ladder ===
| Pos | Team | Pld | W | L | D | PF | PA | Pts |
|---|---|---|---|---|---|---|---|---|
| 1 | Semaphore Central | 18 | 16 | 2 | 0 | 2025 | 1091 | 32 |
| 2 | S.A. Railways Institute | 18 | 14 | 4 | 0 | 2106 | 1413 | 28 |
| 3 | Exeter | 18 | 13 | 5 | 0 | 2147 | 1331 | 26 |
| 4 | Payneham | 18 | 12 | 6 | 0 | 2253 | 1384 | 24 |
| 5 | University | 18 | 11 | 7 | 0 | 1576 | 1480 | 22 |
| 6 | Kenilworth | 18 | 11 | 7 | 0 | 1791 | 1781 | 22 |
| 7 | Colonel Light Gardens | 18 | 4 | 14 | 0 | 1203 | 1712 | 8 |
| 8 | Underdale | 18 | 4 | 14 | 0 | 1271 | 2022 | 8 |
| 9 | St. Peter's O.C. | 18 | 3 | 15 | 0 | 1119 | 2097 | 6 |
| 10 | Teachers' College | 18 | 2 | 16 | 0 | 840 | 2021 | 4 |

=== Finals ===
==== Semi Finals ====
| | Semi-finals |
| Saturday, 31 August | Semaphore Central 12.13 | def. by | Exeter 12.14 | Woodville Oval |
| Saturday, 31 August | Railways' Institute 17.10 | def. | Payneham 10.15 | Mortlock Oval |

==== Preliminary Final ====
Saturday, 7 September | Railways' Institute | def. by | Exeter | Thebarton Oval
2.3 (15); 5.9 (39); 7.11 (53); 10.15 (75) | Q1; Q2; Q3; Final | 1.1 (7); 5.3 (33); 10.9 (69); 11.11 (77) | Umpires: M.F. Armstrong
M. Footer 4, J. McLoughlin, Harper, Heffernan, Edgwood, McKnight, Telfer | Goals | Kinlough 4, Doyle 2, Johnson 2, Kay, Gower, Bath
J. McLoughlin, Edgwood, Gill, E. Bertram, O'Brien, Telfer | Best | Nelson, Anderson, Doyle, Bath, Callinan, Moon, Galton

==== Challenge Final ====
Saturday, 14 September | Semaphore Central | def. by | Exeter | Alberton Oval
1.3 (9); 3.5 (23); 4.10 (34); 5.12 (42) | Q1; Q2; Q3; Final | 4.1 (25); 7.2 (44); 10.6 (66); 11.11 (77) | Umpires: M.F. Armstrong
Holman 3, Quinn 2 | Goals | Kinlough 4, Gower 3, Kay 2, Dotle, Swanson
Sangster, A. Holman, Quinn, Mead, Wightman, Woodhead | Best | Moon, Vincent, Bath, Doyle, Nelson, Anderson
Heaton (ordered off in the final minutes) | Reports

== A2 ==
=== Ladder ===
| Pos | Team | Pld | W | L | D | PF | PA | Pts |
|---|---|---|---|---|---|---|---|---|
| 1 | Walkerville | 18 | 16 | 2 | 0 | 2153 | 1177 | 32 |
| 2 | Woodville | 18 | 15 | 3 | 0 | 1855 | 919 | 30 |
| 3 | Prince Alfred O.C. | 18 | 15 | 3 | 0 | 1687 | 1203 | 30 |
| 4 | Y.M.C.A | 18 | 11 | 7 | 0 | 1525 | 1300 | 22 |
| 5 | Pulteney O.S. | 18 | 10 | 8 | 0 | 1448 | 1505 | 20 |
| 6 | Alberton Church United | 18 | 8 | 10 | 0 | 1275 | 1498 | 16 |
| 7 | King's O.C. | 18 | 5 | 12 | 1 | 1480 | 1722 | 11 |
| 8 | University B | 18 | 3 | 14 | 1 | 947 | 1888 | 7 |
| 9 | Payneham B | 18 | 3 | 15 | 0 | 850 | 1366 | 6 |
| 10 | Combined Banks | 18 | 3 | 15 | 0 | 1060 | 1702 | 6 |

=== Finals ===
==== Semi Finals ====
| | Semi-finals |
| Saturday, 31 August | Walkerville 14.20 | def. | Prince Alfred O.C. 12.20 | Payneham Oval |
| Saturday, 31 August | Woodville 11.12 | def. | Y.M.C.A. 9.9 | Railways Oval |

==== Final ====
Saturday, 7 September | Walkerville | def. | Woodville | Prospect Oval
5.2 (32); 6.3 (39); 12.11 (83); 13.13 (91) | Q1; Q2; Q3; Final | 2.0 (12); 4.3 (27); 4.4 (28); 8.11 (59) | Umpires: G.B. Allen
Cox 6, Taylo 3, Maley 2, Hawke, Dillon | Goals | Wyles 3, W. Edwards, Hendry, Dangerfield, Morris, Hudson
Hawke, Cox, Shepherdson, Dillon, Adcock, Taylor | Best | Evans, Hendry, McFarlane, Bridgman, Morris, Fry
