= Portland Football Club =

Portland Football Club may refer to:

- Portland Football Club (South Australia), an Australian rules football club in South Australia, Australia
- Portland Football Netball Cricket Club, an Australian rules football, netball and cricket club in Victoria, Australia
