= Morphettville Park Football Club =

Morphettville Park

Names
- Full name: Morphettville Park Football Club
- Nickname: Roos
- Club song: "We're a Happy Team at Morphies"

Club details
- Founded: 1958; 68 years ago
- Colours: red gold
- Competition: Adelaide Footy League – Division 4
- President: Paul Farrelly
- Ground: Kellett Reserve

Uniforms
| Home | Away |

The Morphettville Park Football Club is a sports club first formed in 1958 and initial games were against sides who had forfeits or byes. The club is mostly known for their Australian rules football team, which joined the Glenelg-South-West District Football Association A2 Division in 1959.

Other sports practised at Morphettville Park are cricket and netball.

== History ==
After winning the A2 Premiership in 1963, Morphettville Park were promoted to the A1 division where they remained until the competition, then known as the Southern Metropolitan Football League, folded at the end of the 1986 season. Morphettville Park transferred to the Southern Football League with the Marion and Plympton clubs in 1987 and moved to the Adelaide Footy League in 2017 alongside Brighton Districts and Old Scholars Football Club.

The Women's team started in 2007, when the Sturt Wome'’s team relocated to Morphettville Park. and since then has become one of the most successful amateur teams in women's football in South Australia. As part of the South Australian Women's Football League they won three consecutive premierships from 2014 to 2016, continued their success as part of the Adelaide Footy League, winning three more premierships, in 2021, 2023 and 2025.

Morphettville Park FC has produced one Australian Football League (AFL) player, Tony McGuinness, formerly of Adelaide and Footscray.

A number of AFLW players have represented Morphettville Park, including Adelaide Crows premiership players Deni Varnhagen, Jess Sedunary, Courtney Cramey, Justine Mules, Ebony Marinoff, Anne Hatchard. State cricketer Alex Price won the league goalkicking medal representing Morphettville Park in 2014.

== Honours ==
- A-Grade Men's Premiership (3):
  - 1963 Glenelg-South-West District Football Association A2
  - 1990 Southern Football League Division 1
  - 2021 Adelaide Footy League Division 4
- A-Grade Women's Premiership (6):
  - 2014, 2015, 2016 South Australian Women's Football League
  - 2021, 2023, 2025 Adelaide Footy League
- U/18 Girls' Premiership (2):
  - 2014, 2017 South Australian Women's Football League

== Former Logo ==

| Preceded by Plympton | SFL Division 1 Premiers; 1990 | Succeeded by Noarlunga |
