= Will Day =

Australian rules footballer (born 2001)

- Day in September 2026

Personal information
- Full name: Will Day
- Nickname: Daysy
- Born: 5 June 2001 (age 25); South Australia
- Original team: PHOS Camden (SA)/West Adelaide (SANFL)
- Draft: No. 13, 2019 national draft
- Debut: Round 6, 2020, Hawthorn vs. Collingwood, at Giants Stadium
- Height: 191 cm (6 ft 3 in)
- Weight: 83 kg (183 lb)
- Position: Midfielder

Club information
- Current club: Hawthorn
- Number: 12

Playing career^{1}
Years	Club	Games (Goals)
2020–	Hawthorn	89 (28)
- ^{1} Playing statistics correct to the end of 2026.

Career highlights
- Peter Crimmins Medal: 2023; 22Under22 team: 2023

Will Day (born 5 June 2001) is a professional Australian rules footballer with the Hawthorn Football Club in the Australian Football League (AFL). Day is the grandson of 1971 VFL Grand Final premiership player Robert Day.

== Early career ==
Will played his junior football at local club PHOS Camden. He was part of the SANFL junior development programs at Glenelg before transferring to West Adelaide, (where his grandfather had played) for better opportunities. In 2019, he played for South Australia in the under-18 national championships as well as playing three reserves games. He went to school at Sacred Heart College.

== AFL career ==
Day's AFL career was initially hampered by the COVID-19 pandemic. As a young player coming into the system, Day would normally start by playing with the Hawthorn affiliate, Box Hill Hawks, but because that competition had been suspended for the year he had to show his mettle with scratch matches against other AFL clubs.

Day made his AFL debut in Round 6, 2020, against Collingwood at Giants Stadium. Day received a Rising Star nomination after round 16, 2020.

He had an injury-affected season in 2021, fracturing an ankle against Richmond in Round 3. He recovered in time to play in round 13 and played another three games for the season before having complications from his injury.

In April 2023 Day re-signed with Hawthorn and is contracted until 2027.

== Statistics ==
Updated to the end of 2026.

Legend
G	Goals	K	Kicks	D	Disposals	T	Tackles
B	Behinds	H	Handballs	M	Marks

Season	Team	No.	Games	Totals							Averages (per game)							Votes
Season	Team	No.	Games	G	B	K	H	D	M	T	G	B	K	H	D	M	T	Votes
2020 (Note: The 2020 season was played with 17 home-and-away matches per team (down from 22) and 16-minute quarters with time on (down from 20-minute quarters with time on) due to the impact of the COVID-19 pandemic.)	Hawthorn	30	11	1	1	101	72	173	48	15	0.1	0.1	9.2	6.5	15.7	4.4	1.4	0
2021	Hawthorn	12	5	0	0	55	44	99	25	8	0.0	0.0	11.0	8.8	19.8	5.0	1.6	1
2022	Hawthorn	12	17	3	1	169	104	273	68	33	0.2	0.1	9.9	6.1	16.1	4.0	1.9	0
2023	Hawthorn	12	21	6	6	262	275	537	122	73	0.3	0.3	12.5	13.1	25.6	5.8	3.5	8
2024	Hawthorn	12	16	3	4	146	163	309	43	74	0.2	0.3	9.1	10.2	19.3	2.7	4.6	8
2025	Hawthorn	12	6	6	4	63	63	126	18	31	1.0	0.7	10.5	10.5	21.0	3.0	5.2	4
2026	Hawthorn	12	13	9	5	149	119	268	47	52	0.7	0.4	11.5	9.2	20.6	3.6	4.0	6
Career			89	28	21	945	840	1785	371	286	0.3	0.2	10.6	9.4	20.1	4.2	3.2	27

== Honours and achievements ==
Team

- McClelland Trophy (Hawthorn): 2024

Individual

- Peter Crimmins Medal: 2023
- 22under22 team: 2023
- AFL Rising Star nominee: 2020
