= Kaurna Eagles Football Club =

Kaurna Eagles

Names
- Full name: Kaurna Eagles Football Club
- Former name(s): Glandore (1958-2001); Glandore Eagles (2002-2003)
- Nickname(s): Eagles

Club details
- Founded: 1958
- Dissolved: 2007
- Colours: Blue, Gold
- Former ground(s): Glandore Oval (1958-2001)
- Ovingham Oval (2002)
- Pennington Oval (2003-2006)
- Mawson Lakes Oval (2007)

Kaurna Eagles Football Club was an Australian rules football club based in Mawson Lakes, South Australia that folded at the end of the 2007 South Australian Amateur Football League (SAAFL) season.

== History ==
The club was established in 1958 as the Glandore Football Club based at Glandore Oval in the suburb of Glandore, south of Adelaide. Upon establishment, Glandore joined the Glenelg-South-West District Football Association and had almost instant success, winning the A1 premiership in 1961, their fourth season. Glandore remained in that competition (which changed names a couple of times), until the end of the then 1984 Southern Metropolitan Football League season.

In 1985 the club moved to the South Australian Amateur Football League where it started in the A6 division, where it gradually made its way up the divisions until it reached Division 1 in 2000. The 2001 season saw the club in turmoil, poor on-field results, loss of players and an eventual loss of their home ground.

A new administration was installed for 2002, the club was renamed Glandore Eagles Football Club, relocated to Ovingham and was dropped to Division 5. Glandore Eagles won the Division 5 premiership that season but was once again on the move, relocating for the second time in two years, this time to Pennington Oval in Pennington.

Having relocated twice, by 2004 the club had little connection left to the suburb of Glandore, as a result the name Kaurna Eagles Football Club was adopted. Relocating again, this time to Mawson Lakes Oval, the club eventually folded at the end of the 2007 season.

== A-Grade Premierships ==
- Glenelg-South-West District Football Association A1 (3)
  - 1961
  - 1963
  - 1965
- South Australian Amateur Football League Division 2 (1)
  - 1999
- South Australian Amateur Football League Division 3 (1)
  - 1998
- South Australian Amateur Football League Division 5 (1)
  - 2002
- South Australian Amateur Football League A6 (1)
  - 1992
