= Cameron Wood (footballer) =

Australian rules footballer (born 1987)

Personal information
- Full name: Cameron Wood
- Born: 4 March 1987 (age 39)
- Original teams: West Adelaide (SANFL); Goodwood Saints (AdFL)
- Draft: 18th overall, 2004; Brisbane Lions
- Height: 204 cm (6 ft 8 in)
- Weight: 107 kg (236 lb)
- Position: Ruckman

Playing career^{1}
Years	Club	Games (Goals)
2005–2007	Brisbane Lions	16 (0)
2008–2012	Collingwood	48 (21)
2014–2016	Carlton	24 (7)
Total		88 (28)
- ^{1} Playing statistics correct to the end of 2016.

Career highlights
- AFL Rising Star nomination 2007

Cameron Wood (born 4 March 1987) is a former professional Australian rules footballer who played for the Brisbane Lions, Collingwood Football Club and Carlton Football Club in the Australian Football League (AFL).

== Brisbane Lions ==
He was recruited as the number 18 draft pick in the 2004 AFL draft from West Adelaide. He made his debut for the Brisbane Lions in Round 5, 2005 against West Coast Eagles. In Round 2, 2007, he earned an AFL Rising Star nomination for his efforts in a 52-point victory over St Kilda playing as a ruckman.

== Collingwood ==
On 11 October 2007, Wood was officially traded to Collingwood for the Magpies' highest draft selection, number 14. Collingwood acquired Wood to bolster their ruck division and provide back up for Josh Fraser.

Wood played few games in the Magpies' 2010 premiership season and 2011 season due in large to the teams ruck options being bolstered by the recruitment of Darren Jolly and the decision to play utility Leigh Brown as second ruckman. With Fraser's departure to the Gold Coast Suns and Leigh Brown's retirement. Wood was kept out of the Magpies' side for most of the 2012 season with Chris Dawes and Darren Jolly playing as ruckmen for most of the season, he only managed to play in 6 matches.

Wood was delisted on 29 October 2012 after 48 games for Collingwood. During the 2013 season, he played for Williamstown in the VFL.

== Carlton ==
On 27 November 2013 Wood was recruited by Carlton Football Club in the rookie draft. He made his debut for Carlton on 18 July 2014 in an upset win over North Melbourne, in what was his first AFL game since round 22 of the 2012 home and away season. He took seven marks and won 26 hit-outs as well as 10 disposals in an impressive return to AFL football. In a post-match interview with CFC TV after the win Wood said, 'this time last year playing AFL again was one of the last things on my mind'. He played the last six games of the season, and was a regular in Carlton's ruck rotation in 2015, playing eighteen games.

The recruitments of ruckmen Andrew Phillips and Daniel Gorringe prior to the 2016 season pushed Wood down Carlton's depth chart, and he did not play a senior game in 2016. At the conclusion of the 2016 season, he announced his retirement from the AFL.

== Post-football ==
Prior to winning quiz show The Chase Australia in 2017, Wood announced that he was studying to become a teacher.

== Statistics ==
Legend
G	Goals	K	Kicks	D	Disposals	T	Tackles
B	Behinds	H	Handballs	M	Marks	H/O	Hit-outs

Season	Team	No.	Games	Totals								Averages (per game)							
Season	Team	No.	Games	G	B	K	H	D	M	T	H/O	G	B	K	H	D	M	T	H/O
2005	Brisbane Lions	31	1	0	0	3	4	7	3	2	8	0.0	0.0	3.0	4.0	7.0	3.0	2.0	8.0
2006	Brisbane Lions	31	7	0	0	21	28	49	25	10	73	0.0	0.0	3.0	4.0	7.0	3.6	1.4	10.4
2007	Brisbane Lions	31	8	0	0	23	23	46	21	14	97	0.0	0.0	2.9	2.9	5.8	2.6	1.8	12.1
2008	Collingwood	19	13	6	6	58	64	122	53	20	142	0.5	0.5	4.5	4.9	9.4	4.1	1.5	10.9
2009	Collingwood	19	13	4	3	84	87	171	56	29	204	0.3	0.2	6.5	6.7	13.2	4.3	2.2	15.7
2010	Collingwood	19	4	3	1	15	20	35	8	4	42	0.8	0.3	3.8	5.0	8.8	2.0	1.0	10.5
2011	Collingwood	19	12	5	1	83	67	150	38	33	265	0.4	0.1	6.9	5.6	12.5	3.2	2.8	22.1
2012	Collingwood	19	6	3	0	39	38	77	22	15	132	0.5	0.0	6.5	6.3	12.8	3.7	2.5	22.0
2014	Carlton	36	6	2	2	44	23	67	26	12	143	0.3	0.3	7.3	3.8	11.2	4.3	2.0	23.8
2015	Carlton	36	18	5	3	108	72	180	33	34	319	0.3	0.2	6.0	4.0	10.0	1.8	1.9	17.7
2016	Carlton	36	0	—	—	—	—	—	—	—	—	—	—	—	—	—	—	—	—
Career			88	28	16	478	426	904	285	173	1425	0.3	0.2	5.4	4.8	10.3	3.2	2.0	16.2
