= Hamish Hartlett =

Australian rules footballer (born 1990)

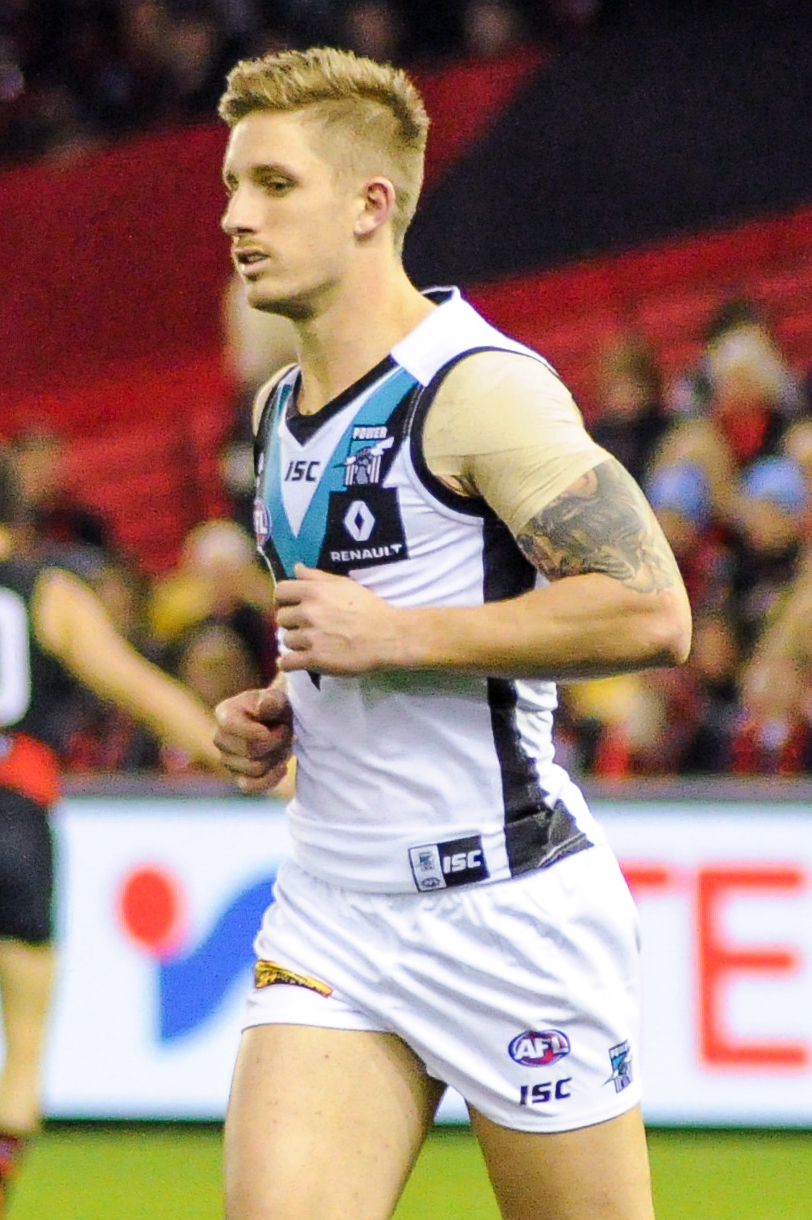
- Hartlett playing for Port Adelaide in June 2017

Personal information
- Full name: Hamish Hartlett
- Nickname: Hammer
- Born: 14 August 1990 (age 36); Adelaide, South Australia
- Original team: West Adelaide (SANFL)/Edwardstown
- Draft: No. 4, 2008 national draft
- Height: 185 cm (6 ft 1 in)
- Weight: 83 kg (183 lb)
- Position: Midfielder

Playing career^{1}
Years	Club	Games (Goals)
2009–2021	Port Adelaide	193 (77)
- ^{1} Playing statistics correct to the end of 2021.

Career highlights
- Gavin Wanganeen Medal: 2011; Showdown Medal: 2014; Peter Badcoe VC Medal: 2013

Hamish Hartlett (born 14 August 1990) is a retired professional Australian rules footballer and coach who played for the Port Adelaide Football Club from 2009 to 2021. Hartlett was drafted by Port Adelaide with pick number 4 in the 2008 AFL draft, making him Port Adelaide's earliest ever AFL draft pick.

== Junior career ==
Hartlett toured South Africa in 2007 as part of the AIS/AFL Academy squad and represented South Australia at the 2008 AFL Under 18 Championships, earning selection in the All Australian side. Originally from Edwardstown Football Club, Hartlett was the captain of the Sacred Heart College first XVIII before he made his debut for West Adelaide in the SANFL in 2007 and has awarded the Round 16 Star Search Award nomination in his seventh senior game.

== AFL career ==
Hartlett's 2010 season was cruelled by injury, with hamstring and quad complaints restricting the talented midfielder to just four games. He missed the start of the AFL season through injury, but worked his way back through the SANFL to play in the clubs AFL Round 5 win over St Kilda before injury struck the following week. He managed two more games for the year, but it was decided after the break to rest him for the remainder of the year. Hartlett was sent to Europe for further treatment on his troublesome hamstring

In 2011 Hartlett overcame shoulder surgery to return to Port Adelaide's AFL side for Round 3 and was then able to string 16 consecutive games together averaging 20.8 disposals per game – his best run in the AFL. In his most consistent year for the club to date, Hartlett finished seventh in the John Cahill Medal and was awarded the Gavin Wanganeen Medal as the club's best rising talent. He spent more time in the midfield later in the year and this saw an increase in his productivity, including a 32 disposal game against St Kilda in Round 16. His season was cut short after Round 20 when he was forced to undergo shoulder surgery. He finished the season fifth in total kicks for the club

Hartlett started the 2012 AFL season with a best on ground performance in Port Adelaide's narrow win over the Saints in Round 1. He had 26 disposals and kicked a vital goal playing across half-back. His early season form was solid, but he struggled to have the impact on games. He continued to mix his time between half-back and the midfield. His best performance of the year came in Round 10 against Carlton, when Hartlett received the three Brownlow votes for 26 disposals and three raking goals from outside 50m. Hartlett's season was derailed in Round 12 when he suffered a hamstring tear, which kept him out until Round 19. He played two matches before being suspended for two weeks for contact with Hawthorn's Cyril Rioli. Hartlett finished the season ranked sixth at the club for average disposals and fourth for total tackles

Season 2014 was considered a breakout season for Hartlett where played the majority of the season in the midfield, averaging 21 disposals and kicking 21 goals. His field kicking was consistently damaging. His best performances of the season were a Showdown medal winning game against the Crows in round 2 and an important semi-final performance where he racked up a team-high 33 disposals.

However, in 2015, Hartlett had an up and down season. He was often serviceable in his role across half-back and pushing up to the wing but seemed to be less damaging, particularly with his kicking inside 50. His tally of 9 goals was well short of his 21 from 2014. He did however record a personal best for disposals in a season and played every game for the first time in his too often injury-interrupted career.

For the 2016 season, Hartlett was announced as the vice-captain of the club to captain Travis Boak.

He was delisted by Port Adelaide at the end of the 2021 AFL season.

After being delisted, Hartlett returned to his junior SANFL club, West Adelaide, and played a full season. He would win the Neil Kerley Award as West Adelaide's Best & Fairest player.

== Coaching career ==
During his final playing season with West Adelaide, Hartlett acted as the club's Youth Development Manager and also was an assistant coach for Port Adelaide's AFL Women's team. In 2023 he became a development coach within the Port's AFL program and in the following year he was appointed coach of the club's SANFL side. Hartlett ceased coaching the SANFL side following the 2025 season, and was appointed the senior side's assistant coach for stoppages, contest and opposition analysis.

== Personal life ==
He is the younger brother of former Carlton forward Adam Hartlett.

His sister Annabel, known by her stage name Godlands, is a DJ, songwriter, and music producer.
