= St Leonards Football Club =

St Leonards

Names
- Full name: St Leonards Football Club
- Nickname: "Saints"

Club details
- Founded: 1930
- Dissolved: Last known active in 1963
- Competition: Glenelg South-West District Football League
- Premierships: 2 (1934, 1935)
- Ground: Wigley Reserve, Glenelg North

The St Leonards Football Club, nicknamed the Saints, was an Australian rules football club based at Wigley Reserve in Glenelg North, a suburb of Adelaide, South Australia. Formed in 1930, the club competed in the Mid-Southern Football Association and its successor competitions, including the Glenelg District Football Association and Glenelg South-West District Football League.

St Leonards won consecutive Glenelg District Football Association A Grade premierships in 1934 and 1935, completing the 1934 season without losing a match.

The club continued competing until at least 1963, when it was playing in the Glenelg South-West District Football League's A2 Division.

== History ==
=== Formation and early years (1930–1933) ===
St Leonards Football Club was formed in 1930 by members of the local community seeking to establish a football team. The club entered the B Grade competition of the Mid-Southern Football Association and played its home matches at Wigley Reserve.

Its first documented match was against Mortlock Park at Colonel Light Gardens on 10 May 1930, resulting in a one-point defeat. The following week, St Leonards defeated South Road Estate 12.14 (86) to 5.8 (38) at Wigley Reserve. Early players included R. Colyer, Truman, Birrell, A. Brock, M. Brock, Chaplin, Scriven, Slater and C. Hirst.

By 1931, St Leonards was fielding A Grade and B Grade teams. The club emerged as a leading contender in the newly renamed Glenelg District Football Association, heading the premiership table in August before reaching the Grand Final against Sturt. St Leonards lost the Grand Final by seven points on 3 October 1931.

The club's B Grade team won a premiership in 1933.

=== Premiership years (1934–1935) ===
St Leonards won the 1934 Glenelg District Football Association A Grade premiership, defeating Blackwood in the Grand Final. The team completed the season undefeated.

The Saints secured a second consecutive A Grade premiership in 1935, defeating Camden 9.14 (68) to 7.15 (57) at Glenelg Oval on 28 September. The Grand Final was closely contested, with St Leonards establishing the decisive lead late in the final quarter.

The St Leonards Colts also won an underage premiership in 1935. The team was honoured at a dinner hosted by Bert Rodgers at the St Leonard's Inn on 12 September. Speeches at the function emphasised developing local young footballers for the club's senior team rather than recruiting established country players.

=== Wigley Reserve and community activities ===
St Leonards played its home matches at Wigley Reserve, which had been developed by the Glenelg Council for football, cricket and other sporting activities.

During 1931 and 1932, the club was involved in financing the construction of changing facilities at the reserve. Funds were raised through dances and public contributions, with Glenelg Council contributing towards the cost.

The project became the subject of a dispute between the club and Glenelg Council over the terms of a proposed twenty-year lease. In August 1932, honorary secretary H. J. Curnow stated that the club had spent approximately £101 on the shed and associated improvements. The club engaged representatives Povey & Waterhouse and threatened legal proceedings if the originally proposed arrangements were not honoured.

The club also maintained an active social organisation. In February 1932, chairman W. J. McIntosh referred to the organisation as the St Leonards Football and Cricket Club and described its efforts to provide sporting and social opportunities for members, including those affected by unemployment.

By 1937, Glenelg Council was allocating Wigley Reserve for use by the St Leonards senior and Colts football teams, with other available dates allocated to lacrosse clubs.

=== Post-war football (1946–1953) ===
St Leonards continued competing in the Glenelg District Football Association following the Second World War.

In 1947, the Saints remained competitive at Wigley Reserve, where they were described as particularly difficult to defeat. In July, St Leonards narrowly lost to Blackwood, before recording a substantial victory over the same opponent later in the season.

St Leonards remained active during the early 1950s, maintaining club premises at Wigley Reserve.

=== Later years (1957–1963) ===
The club continued participating in the Glenelg-South-West District Football League during the late 1950s.

St Leonards emerged as a leading B Grade side in 1959, heading the premiership table in July. By late August, the team was described as undefeated, with promotion to A Grade anticipated for the following season.

The club was promoted to A Grade for 1960, but withdrew shortly before the season commenced. Its withdrawal reduced the A Grade competition to eight teams and required the fixture programme to be redrawn.

St Leonards continued competing in B Grade, finishing second on the 1960 premiership table and qualifying for the finals.

Following further competition restructuring, St Leonards was listed in the A2 Division for 1962.

The club continued in A2 during 1963.

St. Leonards did not appear in published competition tables in 1964, although its exact date of withdrawal or dissolution has not been established.

== Premierships ==
=== A Grade ===
- Glenelg District Football Association (2)
  - 1934 – defeated Blackwood; undefeated throughout the season.
  - 1935 – defeated Camden, 9.14 (68) to 7.15 (57).

=== Other grades ===
- Glenelg District Football Association B Grade (1)
  - 1933
- St. Leonards Colts (1)
  - 1935

== Notable players ==
=== Ray Curnow ===
Ray Curnow began his football career with St Leonards in 1930 before joining Glenelg Football Club in 1932. He subsequently played 88 senior league matches, was a member of Glenelg's 1934 premiership team, and later became the club's secretary.

In a 1954 newspaper profile, Curnow recalled being nominated as captain of St Leonards at the age of 17 before initially being omitted from the playing side. His father, Harry Curnow, was also involved in football administration.

=== Mel Brock ===
Mel Brock, winner of the 1940 Magarey Medal while playing for Glenelg, also played with St Leonards.

== See also ==
- Southern Metropolitan Football League
- Glenelg Football Club
- Glenelg North, South Australia
