= Port Adelaide and District Football Association =

Local level Australian Rules Football association

The Port Adelaide and District Football Association (PADFA) was an Australian rules football competition based in the western and north-western suburbs of Adelaide, South Australia until it folded in 1952.

It was first formed in 1911 as the Port Adelaide and Suburban Football Association under the auspices of the Port Adelaide Y.M.C.A., initially as a church based competition.

Following World War I, the association reformed, between 1921 and 1923 was known as the Port Adelaide and Suburban Church Football Association, and in 1924 was renamed the Port Adelaide and District Football Association.

== Controversy ==
- The competition made the news in 1915 when late during the Grand Final, an Ethelton player kicked his Port Catholic opponent after he was beaten to the ball. Multiple fights broke out on the field as a result. Ethelton, who held a small margin at the time, lost the lead, and as a result, the match. When the siren sounded, several hundred spectators stormed the ground fighting. A number of people were injured. Ethelton went on to win the Challenge Final for the Premiership the following week.
- The association came into potential legal trouble in 1923 when a group of footballers calling themselves the "Rosewater Catholics" nominated a team in the place of the existing club of that name. The existing Rosewater Catholic club that participated in the previous season were instructed to adopt a new name to avoid confusion. Father Gearon, the Parish Priest of Rosewater, was given special permission to state his case for his team and not the new team. It is not known which team eventually participated as Rosewater Catholic.

== Member Clubs ==
Club	Years Participating	Notes
Abattoirs	1915	
Albert Park	1910–15, 1920–32	
Alberton Baptist	1911–12, 1920–22	
Alberton Church United	1915, 1924–30	
Alberton Juniors	1915	
Alberton Methodist	1911–13, 1920	
Birkenhead	1915, 1933	
Birkenhead Junior	1929–41	
Birkenhead Sports	1947–51	
Brighton	1936	
Camden	1936	
Central Junior	1911	
Eastwood	-1952	
Ethelton	1913–15, 1920–51	
Exeter	1931, 1949	Semaphore Central Juniors (1931)
Glanville Methodist	1920	
Kilkenny Terminus	1933	
Kilkenny United	1927–1933	
Largs Bay	1932–33	
Naval Cadets	1915	
Ottoway	1933–35	
Peterhead	1933	
Peterhead Mission	1920	
Port Adelaide Methodist	1912–13	
Port Catholic	1914–15	
Port Adelaide Church United	1920–23	
Port Adelaide Congregational	1911–13	Port Congregationalist (1911)
Port Junior	1912	
Queenstown	1912–15	Queenstown Church of Christ (1912)
Riverside	1933–48	
Rosatala	1922–1933	Rosatala Church United (1922–31)
Rosewater	1920–48	
Rosewater Catholic	1922–23	
Royal Park	1923-1951	
Semaphore Baptist	1911	
Semaphore Central B	1949	
Semaphore Park	1934–50	
Semaphore Church United	1920–23	
St. George	1913	
Woodville	1938–39	
Woodville Catholic	1922–24	

== Premierships ==
=== A-Grade ===
- 1911 - Albert Park
- 1912
- 1913 - Ethelton
- 1914 - Port Catholic
- 1915 - Ethelton
- 1916–19 - in recess (World War I)
- 1920 - Rosewater
- 1921 - Rosewater
- 1922 - Rosewater
- 1923 - Port Adelaide Church United
- 1924 - Ethelton
- 1925 - Alberton Church United
- 1926 - Albert Park
- 1927 - Albert Park
- 1928 - Rosatala Church United
- 1929 - Rosewater
- 1930 - Semaphore
- 1931 - Rosatala
- 1932 - Kilkenny United
- 1933 - Riverside
- 1934 - Riverside
- 1935 - Riverside
- 1936 - Riverside
- 1937 - Riverside
- 1938 - Birkenhead Sports
- 1939
- 1940
- 1941
- 1942–46 - in recess (World War II)
- 1947
- 1948 - Rosewater
- 1949 - Semaphore Park
- 1950 - Semaphore Park
- 1951

== Medallists ==
- President's Medal
  - 1923 - L. Graves (Rosatala Church United)
  - 1925 - H. Penn (Rosewater)
  - 1926 - K. T. Williams (Alberton Methodist)
  - 1928 - T. Waye (Rosatala Church United)
- S. Hosking Medal
  - 1929 - J. Howe (Semaphore Central B)
- President's Medal
  - 1930 - V. Williams (Queenstown)
- A.J. Swain Trophy
  - 1951 - H. Dennis (Ethelton)

== Leading Goalkickers ==
- 1923 - J. Wallace (Semaphore Church United)
- 1925 - J. Simon (Rosatala Church United) - 40
- 1950 - C. Berry (Birkenhead) -
- 1951 - C. Berry (Birkenhead) - 69
