= SMOSH West Lakes Football Club =

Australian rules football club

SMOSH West Lakes

Names
- Full name: St Michael's Old Scholars and Hindmarsh West Lakes Football Club
- Nickname: Lions
- Club song: "We wear the colours, maroon and gold" (in tune to 'Up There, Cazaly')

2019 (Div 4) season
- After finals: 3rd
- Home-and-away season: 1st
- Leading goalkicker: Tory Ziems

Club details
- Founded: 1996; 30 years ago
- Colours: Maroon Blue Gold
- Competition: Adelaide Footy League
- President: John Harradine
- Chairperson: Adam Radloff
- Coach: Josh Shepherd
- Captain: Matthew Gates
- Premierships: 2 D4 (2003) D3 (2007)
- Ground: West Lakes Shore Oval
- Guernsey:

The SMOSH West Lakes Football Club is an Australian rules football club based in the western suburbs of Adelaide which was formed in 1996 as a merger between the former St. Michael's Old Scholars and Hindmarsh Football Club and West Lakes Football Club. The club has participated in the South Australian Amateur Football League since being formed.

== A-Grade Premierships ==
- South Australian Amateur Football League Division 3 (1)
  - 2007
- South Australian Amateur Football League Division 4 (1)
  - 2003

== Merger history ==
SMOSH West Lakes was formed in 1996 through the amalgamation of St. Michael's Old Scholars and Hindmarsh Football Club and West Lakes Football Club.

=== St. Michael’s Old Scholars and Hindmarsh (SMOSH) ===
The St. Michael's Old Scholars and Hindmarsh Football Club was first formed as church team St. Saviour, representing St. Saviour's Catholic Church at Brompton, which was open from 1868 to 1924. Some records indicate matches were played against other church teams in the 1890s but it is not known if these were part of an organised competition. The first record of participating in an organised competition was when they finished runners-up to St. Francis Xavier's in the St. Vincent de Paul Football Association in 1907. St. Saviour's was renamed Hindmarsh CYM (Catholic Young Men) for four years from 1939 before a slight change of name to Hindmarsh CYMS (Catholic Young Men's Society) in 1943. In 1975, the club formed a partnership with St Michael's College and once again changed names to become St. Michael's Old Scholars and Hindmarsh.

A-Grade Premierships

- Catholic Young Men's Society Football Association (5)
  - 1944
  - 1945
  - 1946 Undefeated
  - 1947 Undefeated
  - 1948
  - 1950
- Adelaide Metropolitan Football League A Division (1)
  - 1967
- South Australian Amateur Football League A3 (1)
  - 1994

=== West Lakes ===
The West Lakes Football Club was first formed as the Semaphore Park Football Club in 1930. In 1978 they joined the South Australian Football Association and in 1984 were renamed West Lakes Football Club.

A-Grade Premierships

- Port Adelaide and District Football Association (2)
  - 1949
  - 1950
- South Australian Amateur Football League A3 (1)
  - 1951 Undefeated
  - 1955
- South Australian Amateur Football League A4 (1)
  - 1967
