= St Peter's Old Collegians Football Club =

St Peter's Old Collegians

Names
- Full name: St Peter's Old Collegians Football Club
- Nickname(s): SPOC, Saints, Blues
- Leading goalkicker: Jock McLeay (31)
- Best and fairest: Henry Nelligan (2025)

Club details
- Founded: 1928
- Colours: blue white
- Competition: SAAFL (Div 1)
- Coach: David Barker
- Captain: Edward Allan
- Premierships: A Grade; Division 1: 1935, 2012; Division 2: 1930, 1952, 1971, 1983, 1985, 1995, 2011, 2018; Division 3: 1996; B Grade; Division 5: 1960; Division 2R: 1964, 1968, 1979, 1983; Division 3R: 2009; Division A1R: 2022; C Grade; Division 9S: 2005; D Grade; Division 10: 1982; Division 7R: 1985, 1986, 1988; Division C7: 2020, 2022; Divison C8: 2021; Women; Division 5: 2026
- Grounds: Caterer Oval
- Wilson Oval

Uniforms
Home	Away

Other information
- Official website: spoc.net.au/football

The Saint Peter's Old Collegians Football Club is an amateur Australian rules football team in the South Australian Amateur Football League (SAAFL) in Australia. SPOC entered SAAFL in 1928 and ranks fourth in the number of seasons played.

SPOCFC is one of the several sports sections belonging to St Peter's College, and the most successful old scholars' club, having won two SAAFL Division 1 premierships in 1935 and 2012. SPOC presently fields four teams for players of all skill and ability levels.

In 2025, SPOCFC joined forces with Wilderness Old Scholars Association (WOSA) to form a women's team. This team finished 4th in its first season and in 2026 won their first premiership in Division 5

Other sports sections of the College include athletics, badminton, basketball, cricket, field hockey, rowing, soccer, tennis, and water polo.
