= St Paul's Old Scholars Football Club =

Australian Rules Football Club

Names
- Full name: St Paul's Old Scholars Football Club
- Nickname(s): SPOS, Saints
- Club song: "When the Saints Go Marching In"

2021 season
- After finals: Runners-up
- Home-and-away season: 3rd
- Leading goalkicker: Matthew Pendlington
- Best and fairest: Riley Henriks

Club details
- Founded: 2015; 11 years ago
- Colours: Black, Gold
- Competition: Adelaide Footy League (Division 5, 5R, C5
- President: Jake Winters
- Coach: Damien Stagg
- Captain(s): Anthony Alesiani, Nik Papaioannou
- Premierships: 1 D7 (2019)
- Ground: St Paul's College, Gilles Plains, South Australia (2015 - Present)

Uniforms
Home	Away	Alternate

Other information
- Official website: www.facebook.com/SPOSFC/

The St Paul's Old Scholars Football Club, more commonly known as SPOS, is an Australian Rules Football Club based in the north-eastern suburbs of Adelaide that was formed in 2015. The club is based at St Paul's College, located on Grand Junction Road in the north-eastern suburb of Gilles Plains. St Paul's senior teams compete in the Adelaide Footy League Division 5, Division 5 Reserves & Division C5 competitions.

== History ==
First Team 1978-1982

St Paul’s College was established in 1958 by the Christian Brothers in north-east Adelaide on Grand Junction Road. The College first formed an Old Scholars team in 1978 where they played in the Adelaide and Suburban Association before joining the South Australian Amateur Football League in 1980. The clubs history was short as they quickly became broke by the end of the 1982 season.

Second Team 1993-2009

In 1993 the club was reborn, spearheaded by Captain and club organiser Ben Trussell. During that inaugural season the club reached the Grand Final which they would eventually lose. By 2001 the club had risen to Division 4 but would eventually only field one team for the 2002 and 2003 season and would subsequently be in Division 10 by the start of the 2003 season. That 2003 season however would bring success for the Old Scholars, as they would finish the season undefeated and claim their first Premiership since the rebirth of the club. The following years would produce mixed results for the club including a lacklustre finals campaign in 2006 and narrowly missing the finals in 2008. By 2009 the club would move from its traditional home at St Pauls College and move to the northern Adelaide suburb of Mawson Lakes where the club would take up residence in the club rooms of the recently disbanded Kaurna Eagles. At the end of the 2009 season there was a call at the Annual General Meeting to drop the St Pauls Old Scholars name and incorporate Mawson Lakes into the clubs name. The proposal was unanimously voted in favour of change and the Mawson Lakes Football Club was born.

Third Team 2015–Present

During the August of 2014 St Pauls College hosted an Old Scholars day and the idea to re-establish a club started to stem. 2010 graduates Matthew Rowson and Jake Winters spearheaded the clubs revival and by the start of the 2015 season the team was re-admitted to the league where they started in Division 7.

St Paul’s lost their first A grade game after reestablishment to Houghton Districts 44-161 but would go on to win seven games in a row before the bye. St Paul’s finished the 2015 season with a 10-6 record finishing 3rd on the ladder but would lose their first final to Mitchell Park 67-92, ending their inaugural season.

The 2016 season saw St Paul’s with stunningly similar results to their inaugural season as they would finish 3rd on the ladder with a 10-6 record. The team would however lose their first final again, this time losing to Prince Alfred College Old Collegians Reserves 58-70. The 2016 season would however gift St Paul’s a second chance in finals and the team won their first final against Flinders University 91-51. The result saw St Paul’s in the preliminary final for a chance at their first Grand Final but they would eventually lose to Prince Alfred again 47-99.

The 2017 Division 7 season was dominated by Adelaide Lutheran and Para Hills who had previously been in Division 6 and 5 respectively. Despite the lopsided clubs, St Paul’s was able to beat Para Hills once 98-76 and the club finished the 2017 season in a respectable 5th, earning them the last finals spot. The club would lose their only final to Tea Tree Gully reserves 29-162.

The 2018 season would see the Mawson Lakes Football Club moved from Division 6 to Division 7, marking the first time the two clubs would be in the same division. St Paul’s would defeat Mawson Lakes in both games of the season, winning by 36 and 17 points. St Paul’s would finish the season second on the ladder, their highest ladder position since re-establishment. St Paul’s would however lose the Qualifying Final to lower placed Marion by 16 points. The team would make amends the next week when they defeated Tea Tree Gully Reserves by 20 points in the semi-final, the same team which eliminated them the previous year. St Paul’s would play their second Preliminary Final since re-establishment but would again lose to Marion.

The 2019 season saw St Paul’s finish their season undefeated, with a regular season record of 17-0. St Paul’s would beat Houghton Districts by 118 points in the semi-final, sending them to their first Grand Final since re-establishment. St Paul’s would ironically play Mawson Lakes in the Grand Final at Thebarton Oval in which St Paul’s won their first premiership, defeating Mawson Lakes by 80 points 111-31.

After winning their first premiership St Paul’s was promoted to Division 6 for the 2020 season which was shortened due to the COVID-19 pandemic. St Paul’s would find instant success in the higher division, finishing 3rd on the ladder with a 7-2 record. St Paul’s won the first final, defeating Blackfriars OS by 34 points. The next week saw St Paul’s lose the semi-final to Hectorville by 31 points, but they would earn a second chance in the Preliminary Final the next week where they defeated Blackfriars OS again, this time by 8 points. St Paul’s would play in their second Grand Final in two years but would again lose to Hectorville, this time by a heartbreaking margin of 2 points.

2021 would see St Paul’s stay in Division 6 despite their Grand Final appearance the year before. St Pauls finished the season in a familiar 3rd on the ladder with a 12-4 record, earning the club a 7th straight finals appearance. St Paul’s defeated Trinity OS by 39 points earning them their 3rd consecutive Grand Final appearance and a shot at their 2nd Premiership. St Pauls would however lose the Grand Final to Elizabeth by 25 points.

== Current Senior Squad (2022 season) ==
2022 Round 1 Squad
A Grade 2022 Team Sheet		Coaching staff
A. Esposito; A. Kambach; A. Alesiani (c); A. Cronshaw; A. Marotti; B. Lennon; B. Nixon; C. Gray; D. Owen; D. Kambach; E. Ibrahim; G. Gibbs; I. Jeffery; J. Markey; J. Snell; J. Huddleston; J. Liseno; J.Wurfel (vc); K Santillo	L. Kennett; L. Kennett; L. Cullinan; L. Davies; L. Giro; M. Pendlington; M. Todd; N. Papaioannou (c); R. Qasimy; R. Henriks; R. Spagnolo; S. Gibbs; T. Charlton; T. Girgolas; T. Ahern; T. Hennekam; T. Soulsby (vc); Z. Norris	Head coach: L. Pitman; Assistant coach: S. Hurnak; Legend: (c) Captain(s); (vc) Vice-captain(s); Updated: 12 July 2022; Source(s): GameDay

== Senior Performance ==
		A Grade					
Year	Div	Pos	Pld	W	L	D	Pts
2015	D7	4th	16	10	6	0	20
2016	D7	3rd	16	10	6	0	20
2017	D7	5th	16	10	6	0	20
2018	D7	2nd	18	14	4	0	28
2019	D7	1st	17	17	0	0	34
2020	D6	3rd	9	7	2	0	14
2021	D6	3rd	16	12	4	0	24
2022	D5	9th	18	2	16	0	4
2023	D6	8th	18	6	11	1	13
2024	D6	5th	18	9	9	0	18
2025	D6	2nd	18	14	4	0	28

*2020 Season was half the length, cut short due to COVID-19. The Adelaide Footy League informed all clubs that there would also be no promotion or relegation for the 2020 season.

Denotes Premiership
Denotes Promotion (Runner-up Grand Finalist)
Denotes Relegation
