= PHOS Camden Football Club =

PHOS Camden

Names
- Full name: PHOS Camden Football Club
- Nickname: Phantoms

2019 (Div 2) season
- After finals: 5th
- Home-and-away season: 5th

Club details
- Founded: 1994; 32 years ago
- Colours
- Competition: Adelaide Footy League
- President: Sarah Fitzpatrick
- Coach: Kane Stewart
- Captain: Sam Ingles
- Ground: Camden Oval, Novar Gardens
- Training ground: Camden Oval, Novar Gardens

Uniforms
Home

Other information
- Official website: phantomsfc.com.au

The PHOS Camden Football Club is an Australian rules football club based in the south western suburbs of Adelaide which was formed in 1994 as a merger between the Plympton High Old Scholars Football Club and Camden Football Club, who had broken away from an existing merger with the Greek Football Club. The club has participated in the South Australian Amateur Football League since being formed.

== A-Grade Premierships ==
- South Australian Amateur Football League Division 1 (2)
  - 2000
  - 2002
- Channel 9 Adelaide Football League Division 3 (1)
  - 2015

== Merger history ==
PHOS Camden was formed in 1994 through the amalgamation of Plympton High Old Scholars Football Club and the remnants of the Camden Football Club.

=== Plympton High Old Scholars (PHOS) ===
The Plympton High Old Scholars Football Club was formed in 1971 and based at Myer Oval (later to be known as N. S. Bull Memorial Oval), behind the former Plympton High School. In 1994 the club relocated to Camden Oval as part of a merger with the remnants of the former Camden Football Club to become PHOS Camden.

A-Grade Premierships

- South Australian Amateur Football League A3 (1)
  - 1989
- South Australian Amateur Football League A4 (1)
  - 1979
- South Australian Amateur Football League A5 (2)
  - 1972
  - 1977

=== Camden ===
The Camden Football Club Mid-Southern Football Association. Camden Football Club began in 1929 in the then Glenelg Districts Football Association when a group of friends, who lived in Camden, decided to form a football club. The club colours were decided as chocolate and blue (the State colours of the time) and the jumper design was alternate chocolate and blue stripes. and continued in the Glenelg District Football Association and remained in that competition throughout its name changes until it folded at the end of 1986, then known as the Southern Metropolitan Football League. In 1987 the club merged with Greek Football Club to form the Greek Camden Football Club. This merger would last until 1993 when the club split back into Greek and Camden, with Camden forming a new merger with the Plympton High Old Scholars Football Club to form the PHOS Camden Football Club.

A-Grade Premierships

- Glenelg District Football Association (1)
  - 1937
- Glenelg-South-West District Football Association A1 (1)
  - 1959
- Glenelg-South Adelaide Football Association A1 (4)
  - 1972
  - 1974
  - 1975
  - 1976

==== Greek Camden ====
The Greek Camden Football Club was formed in 1987 from a merger of the Greek Football Club and the Camden Football Club. In 1994 the club split back into Greek and Camden, with Greek forming a new merger with the Henley District and Old Scholars Football Club to form the Henley Greek Football Club, and Camden forming a new merger with the Plympton High Old Scholars Football Club to form the PHOS Camden Football Club.

- South Australian Amateur Football League A1 (2)
  - 1990 Undefeated
  - 1991

== AFL players ==
- Ryan Burton
- Brayden Maynard
- Matthew Scharenberg
- Will Day
- Mattaes Phillipou
- James Sellar
