= Mitchell Park Football Club =

Mitchell Park

Names
- Full name: Mitchell Park Football Club
- Nickname: Lions
- Club song: "Are We? Are We? Are We?"

Club details
- Founded: 1968; 58 years ago
- Colours: green white red
- Competition: South Australian Amateur Football League
- Coach: Scott Weekley
- Ground: Mitchell Park Oval, Mitchell Park

Uniforms
Home

Other information
- Official website: mitchellparkfc.com

The Mitchell Park Football Club, nicknamed the Lions, is an Australian rules football club that was founded in 1968 by Edward McAvaney, currently playing in the South Australian Amateur Football League, that initially played in the Glenelg-South Adelaide Football Association.

Mitchell Park remained in the Glenelg-South Adelaide Football Association, later known as the Southern Metropolitan Football League, until the end of the 1985 season.

Mitchell Park joined the South Australian Football Association in 1986 and remained in that competition they transferred to the Southern Football League Division 1 competition in 1994. Mitchell Park lasted four seasons in the Division 1 competition before they were relegated to the Division 2 competition in 1998.

In 2001, Mitchell Park left the Southern Football League and joined the South Australian Amateur Football League Division 6 competition and have drifted between Divisions 5, 6 and 7 in the years since.

Mitchell Park also fields junior teams in the Metro South Junior Football League.

== A-Grade Premierships ==
- Glenelg-South Adelaide Football Association A2 (2)
  - 1970, 1980
- Southern Metropolitan Football League A1 (1)
  - 1984
- South Australian Amateur Football League Division 6 (1)
  - 2002
- South Australian Amateur Football League Division 7 (2)
  - 2012, 2015
