= Portland Football Club (South Australia) =

Portland

Names
- Full name: Portland Football Club
- Nickname(s): Thunder

2024 (Div 5) season
- After finals: DNQ
- Home-and-away season: 8th

Club details
- Founded: 1997; 28 years ago
- Colours: black white teal
- Competition: Adelaide Footy League
- President: Ron Chapman
- Coach: Craig Smith
- Ground(s): Port Reserve, Port Adelaide

Uniforms
Home	Away	Alternate

Other information
- Official website: portlandfc.org.au

The Portland Football Club is an Australian rules football club based in the western suburbs of Adelaide which was formed in 1997 as a merger between the former Alberton United Football Club, Ethelton Football Club and Riverside Football Club. The club has participated in the South Australian Amateur Football League since being formed.

== A-Grade Premierships ==
- South Australian Amateur Football League Division 2 (1)
  - 2013
- South Australian Amateur Football League Division 4 (2)
  - 2000
  - 2008

== Merger history ==
Portland Football Club was formed in 1997 from a merger of Alberton United, Ethelton and Riverside.

=== Alberton United ===
The Alberton United Football Club was formed in 1915 as the Alberton Church United Football Club based at Queenstown Oval. Initially playing in the Port Adelaide and Suburban Football Association, Alberton Church United shifted to the South Australian Amateur Football League (SAAFL) in 1931. In 1941, they went into recess due to World War II, before returning to the SAAFL in 1946. In 1955 Alberton Church United changed its name to Alberton United, and continued under that name until it merged with Ethelton and Riverside in 1997 to form Portland.

A-Grade Premierships

- Port Adelaide and District Football Association (1)
  - 1925
- South Australian Amateur Football League A2 (4)
  - 1931
  - 1937
  - 1948
  - 1962
- South Australian Amateur Football League A3 (1)
  - 1971
- South Australian Amateur Football League A6 (1)
  - 1994

=== Ethelton ===
Ethelton FC strip

The Ethelton Football Club was established in 1911 and was a longtime member of the Port Adelaide and District Football Association (PADFA). When the PADFA folded in 1952, Ethelton transferred to the West Torrens District Football Association until it joined the South Australian Amateur Football League (SAAFL) in 1956, where it remained until it entered a merger in 1997 with Alberton United and Riverside to form Portland.

A-Grade Premierships

- Port Adelaide and Suburban Football Association (2)
  - 1913
  - 1915
- Port Adelaide and District Football Association (1)
  - 1924
- South Australian Amateur Football League A3 (1)
  - 1982
- South Australian Amateur Football League A4 (1)
  - 1957
- South Australian Amateur Football League A5 (1)
  - 1956

=== Riverside ===
Riverside FC strip

The Riverside Football Club was formed in 1928 and initially participated in the Port Adelaide and District Football Association, followed by a stint in the Adelaide and Suburban Football Association. In 1949, Riverside joined the South Australian Amateur Football League where it remained until it merged with Alberton United and Ethelton in 1997 to form Portland.

A-Grade Premierships

- Port Adelaide and District Football Association (5)
  - 1933
  - 1934
  - 1935
  - 1936
  - 1937
- South Australian Amateur Football League A1 (3)
  - 1958
  - 1983
  - 1984
- South Australian Amateur Football League A2 (3)
  - 1950
  - 1964
  - 1992
