= Plympton Football Club =

Plympton

Names
- Full name: Plympton Football Club
- Nickname: Bulldogs
- Club song: "A Bulldog For Me"

Club details
- Founded: 1937; 89 years ago
- Colours
- Competition: Adelaide Footy League
- President: Jamie Morgan
- Coach: Simon Quinn
- Captain: Brodie McLeod
- Ground: Plympton Park Memorial Recreation Ground, Plympton Park

Uniforms
Home

Other information
- Official website: plymptonbulldogs.com.au

The Plympton Football Club is an Australian sports club based in Plympton Park. Established in 1937, the club is mostly known for its Australian rules football team, which currently plays in the South Australian Amateur Football League. Previously, it had played in the Glenelg District Football Association.

Apart from football, other sports practised at Plympton are cricket and soccer.

== History ==
A Plympton Football Club played in the Mid-Southern Football Association as early as 1921, but the current club is recognised as forming in 1937.

Plympton remained in the Glenelg District Football Association, and its later incarnations until it folded at the end of the 1986 season, at that point known as the Southern Metropolitan Football League. In 1987 Plympton joined the Southern Football League Division 1 competition and proceeded to win three premierships in succession before shifting to the South Australian Football Association for the 1990 season. When the South Australian Football Association folded at the end of the 1995 season, they transferred to the South Australian Amateur Football League where they have competed since.

Plympton also fields junior teams in the Metro South Junior Football League.

Plympton FC has produced a number of Australian Football League (AFL) players including Bryce Gibbs (Carlton), Cameron Hitchcock (Port Adelaide), Christian Howard (Western Bulldogs) and Patrick McCarthy (Carlton).

== A-Grade Premierships ==
- 1950 Glenelg-South-West District Football Association A1
- 1956 Glenelg-South-West District Football Association A1
- 1964 Glenelg-South-West District Football Association A1
- 1967 Glenelg-South Adelaide Football Association A1
- 1979 Glenelg-South Adelaide Football Association A1
- 1981 Glenelg-South Adelaide Football Association A1
- 1985 Southern Metropolitan Football League A1
- 1987 Southern Football League Division 1
- 1988 Southern Football League Division 1
- 1989 Southern Football League Division 1
- 2011 South Australian Amateur Football League Division 5
- 2013 South Australian Amateur Football League Division 4
- 2025 Adelaide Footy League Division 4
