= Goodwood Saints Football Club =

Australian rules football club

Goodwood Saints

Names
- Full name: Goodwood Saints Football Club

Club details
- Founded: 1985; 41 years ago
- Colours: black red gold
- Competition: Adelaide Footy League; SANFL Juniors; SANFL Inclusive League
- President: Jordan Dodd
- Coach: Chad Cornes
- Captain(s): Oliver Johnson & Nick Favretto (2024)
- Premierships: 11; D1 (1997, 2005, 2006, 2007, 2008, 2009, 2014, 2015, 2020); D2 (1990); D3 (1987)
- Ground: Goodwood Oval, Millswood, South Australia

Uniforms
Home

Other information
- Official website: goodwoodsaints.com.au

Goodwood Saints Football Club is an Australian rules football club based in Adelaide. Formed in 1985 (as a merger of the Goodwood Football Club and the St Raphael's Football Club) they compete in the Adelaide Footy League in Division 2 (Men) and Division 1 (Women).

One of the most successful amateur football clubs in Australia, they dominated the Adelaide Footy League in the mid to late 2000s, winning five straight Division 1 grand finals from 2005 to 2009. They also hold the record for the longest time spent in top division of the league, 1991 - 2023, until their first relegation in August 2023.

== A Grade Premierships ==
Men

- South Australian Amateur Football League (Adelaide Footy League) (11)
  - 1987 (Div 3)
  - 1990 (Div 2)
  - 1997 (Div 1)
  - 2005 (Div 1)
  - 2006 (Div 1)
  - 2007 (Div 1)
  - 2008 (Div 1)
  - 2009 (Div 1)
  - 2014 (Div 1)
  - 2015 (Div 1)
  - 2020 (Div 1)

Women

- South Australian Amateur Football League (Adelaide Footy League) (4)
  - 2020 (Div 5)
  - 2021 (Div 4)
  - 2022 (Div 3)
  - 2023 (Div 2)

== Merger history ==
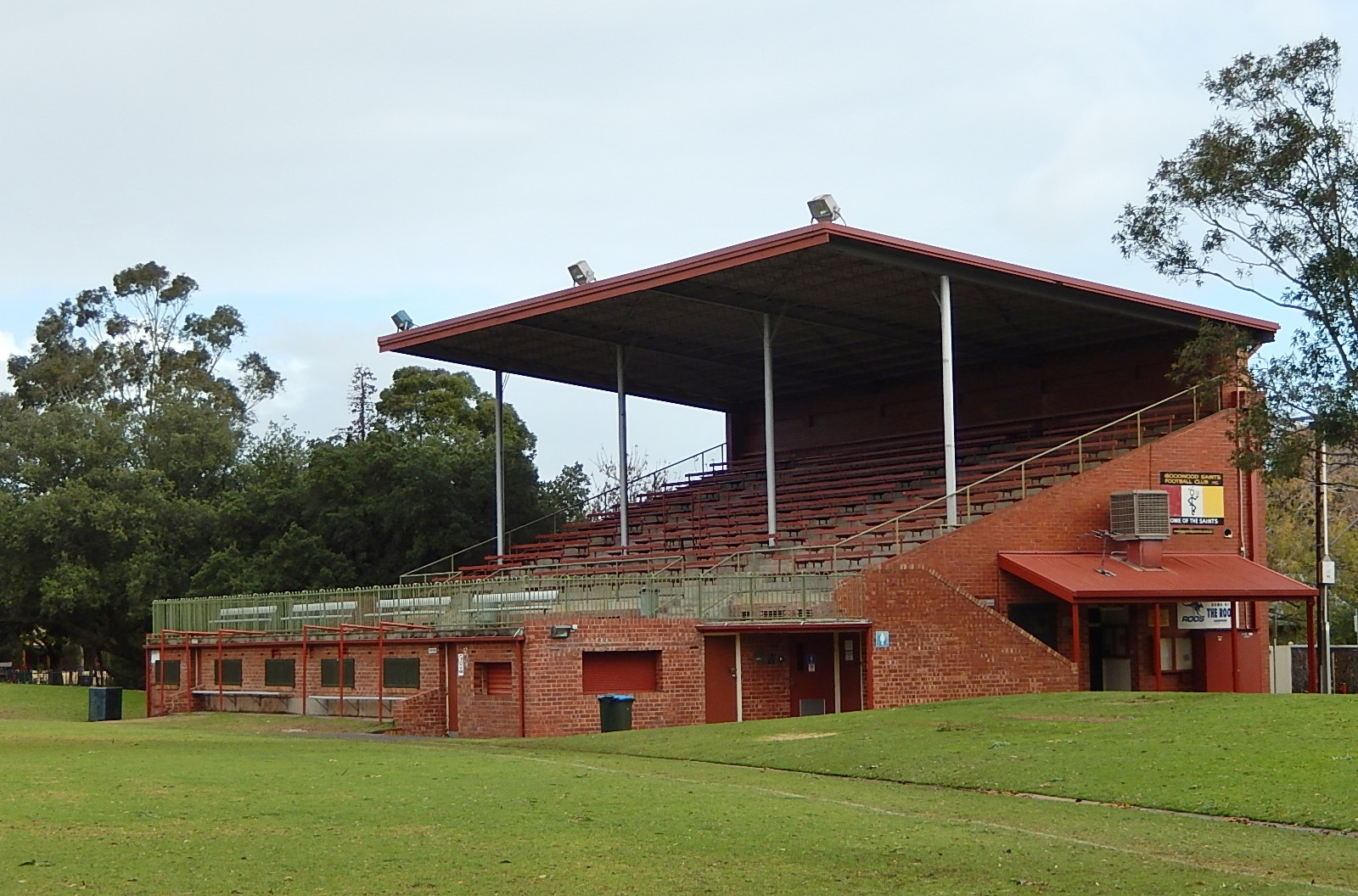
Goodwood Oval

Goodwood Saints Football Club was formed in 1985 as a merger of the Goodwood Football Club and the St Raphael's Football Club.

=== Goodwood ===
The Goodwood Football Club was based at Goodwood Oval and competed in various suburban competitions over its history, most notably the South Australian Amateur Football League and the Glenelg-South Adelaide Football Association.

A-Grade Premierships

- Mid-Southern Football Association (2)
  - 1928
  - 1930
- South Australian Amateur Football League A2 (2)
  - 1947
  - 1967

=== St Raphael's ===
The St Raphael's Football Club were an Adelaide Park Lands based club who regularly shifted between different competitions throughout much of their history.

A-Grade Premierships

- Sturt District Football Association B Division (1)
  - 1951
- South Australian Amateur Football League A4 (1)
  - 1983
- South Australian Amateur Football League A5 (1)
  - 1978

== Notable Past Players ==
Men

- Riley Thilthorpe
- Shane Tuck
- Travis Tuck
- Riley Bonner
- Will Snelling
- Cameron Wood
- Harry Barnett
- Paul Page
- Peter McCarty
- Luke Donaldson
- Brad Dabrowski
- David Bartel
- Trent Mills
- Kenrick Tyrrell
- Anthony Dempsey
- Simon Brooks
