= Edwardstown Football Club =

Edwardstown

Names
- Full name: Edwardstown Football Club
- Nickname: Towns
- Club song: "Step to the Rear"

Club details
- Founded: 1919; 107 years ago
- Colours
- Competition: Adelaide FL
- President: Edward Dessmann
- Coach: Chad Simmons
- Premierships: GDFA (8): 1932, 1939, 1940, 1941, 1943, 1946, 1948, 1949; SWDFA (4): 1952, 1960, 1962, 1966; GSAFA (2): 1973, 1977; SAFA (4): 1980, 1982, 1987, 1988
- Ground: Edwardstown Oval

Uniforms
Home

Other information
- Official website: edwardstownfc.com.au

The Edwardstown Football Club is an Australian rules football club first formed in 1919. In 1938, Edwardstown merged with the Black Forest Football Club from the Adelaide and Suburban Football Association but retained the name Edwardstown. For much of the first 60 years of its existence, the Edwardstown Football Club competed in the Glenelg-South Adelaide District Football League (previously known as the Glenelg-South-West District Football Association and the Mid-Southern Football Association), except for two seasons spent in the Adelaide and Suburban Football Association (1934–35).

In 1978, Edwardstown was a key player in the establishment of the South Australian Football Association (SAFA), a semi-professional league drawing on the stronger clubs of the former Norwood-North Football Association and some other strong metropolitan clubs. Edwardstown won four premierships during the 18 years that the SAFA completion ran. When SAFA folded at the end of the 1995 season, Edwardstown transferred to the South Australian Amateur Football League P1 competition. In 2009, Edwardstown changed leagues once again, with their Senior teams shifting to the Southern Football League.

In 2012, Edwardstown attempted to shift its junior teams from the Metro South Junior Football League (MSJFL) to the Southern Football League, resulting in a breakaway group setting up a separate football club, the Edwardstown Junior Sports Club, in direct competition to the Edwardstown FC, drawing the majority of junior players from them and replacing them in the MSJFL.

At the end of the 2015 season, Edwardstown transferred back to the SAAFL, now known as the Channel 9 Adelaide Football League, being admitted into Division 4.

Edwardstown FC has produced a number of Australian Football League (AFL) players including Hamish Hartlett (Port Adelaide), Danyle Pearce (Fremantle, Port Adelaide), Jordan Russell (Collingwood, Carlton), Adam Hartlett (Carlton) and Caleb Daniel (Western Bulldogs)

== Club song ==
I hear the crowd

Begin to cheer

Get on your knees now ’cause there is a Townie near

Will everyone here kindly step to the rear

And let the Townies lead the way.

We show other clubs how the game should be played,

The goals should be made,

The teamwork really kills them,

Towns are the best

And unlike all the rest

Determination is our game,

The club men are great

Every fellow's your mate

And we’d like you to join in and say,

Would everyone here kindly step to the rear

And let the Townies lead the way,

And let the Townies lead the way!

Former logo of the Edwardstown Football Club

== A-Grade Premierships ==
- Glenelg District Football Association (8): 1932, 1939, 1940, 1941, 1943, 1946, 1948, 1949
- Glenelg-South-West District Football Association (4): 1952, 1960, 1962, 1966
- Glenelg-South Adelaide Football Association (2): 1973, 1977
- South Australian Football Association (4): 1980, 1982, 1987, 1988
- South Australian Amateur Football League Division 2 (1): 2004
