= Brighton Districts and Old Scholars Football Club =

Brighton Bombers

Names
- Full name: Brighton Districts and Old Scholars Football Club Inc.
- Nickname: Bombers
- Former nickname: Saints
- Club song: "See the Bombers Fly Up"

2021 season
- After finals: DNQ
- Home-and-away season: 8th

Club details
- Founded: 1991 (merger)
- Colours: black gold white
- Competition: Adelaide Footy League
- President: Travis Kalleske
- Coach: Clint Godwin
- Captain: Scott Nerlich
- Ground: Brighton Oval, Hove

Uniforms
Home

Other information
- Official website: brightonbombersfc.com.au

The Brighton Districts and Old Scholars Football Club, nicknamed the Bombers, is an Australian rules football club based in the southern suburbs of Adelaide which was formed in 1991 as a merger between the former Brighton Football Club and Brighton High Old Scholars Football Club. Also known as the Brighton Bombers, BDOS competed in the South Australian Amateur Football League (SAAFL). In 1994, BDOS joined the Southern Football League in the junior grades, and were followed by the senior teams from the SAAFL in 1997. In 2017, BDOS shifted to the Adelaide Footy League.

Brighton Districts has produced a number of Australian Football League (AFL) players including Jarrad Sundqvist (Sydney Swans), Matthew Bode (Adelaide), Kane Cornes (Port Adelaide), Ben Kennedy (Collingwood/Melbourne) Bailey Williams (Western Bulldogs), Cory Gregson (Geelong), Jakob Ryan (Collingwood) and Bodie Ryan (Hawthorn).

== A-Grade Premierships ==
- Adelaide Footy League/SAAFL Division 3 (2)
  - 1991
  - 2017
- Southern Football League A-Grade (2)
  - 2002
  - 2011

== Merger history ==
Brighton Districts and Old Scholars was formed in 1991 through the amalgamation of Brighton and Brighton High Old Scholars.

=== Brighton (1938–1990) ===
also Brighton and Seacliff
The Brighton and Seacliff Football Club was formed in 1938 through the amalgamation of the Brighton and Seacliff clubs. Playing in the Glenelg District Football Association, Brighton and Seacliff formed a brief merger with Sturt for four years during World War II, before resuming as a separate entity in 1946. Brighton and Seacliff was renamed back to just Brighton in 1957 and in 1958 transferred to the South Australian Amateur Football League A3 competition, gaining consecutive promotions to the A1 division over the first two seasons. Brighton remained in A1 until they finished last in 1965, played the next three seasons in A2 before shifting back to the now Glenelg-South Adelaide Football Association in 1969. Brighton remained in the Glenelg-South Adelaide FA until its demise at the end of 1986, by then known as the Southern Metropolitan Football League, when they shifted to the South Australian Football Association (SAFA). Brighton competed in the SAFA competition until the end of the 1990 season, when they merged with Brighton High Old Scholars.

A-Grade Premierships

- Glenelg-South-West District Football Association A1 (1)
  - 1957
- Glenelg-South Adelaide Football Association A1 (4)
  - 1970
  - 1978
  - 1982
  - 1983
- Southern Metropolitan Football League A1 (1)
  - 1986
- SAAFL A2 (1)
  - 1959
- SAAFL A3 (1)
  - 1958

==== Brighton (1885–1937) ====
The Brighton Football Club was formed in 1885 playing at 'Turner's Paddock'. In 1912, they were inaugural members of the Sturt Football Association. Brighton continued in that competition as it changed names to Mid-Southern FA and then Glenelg District FA. In 1938 Brighton amalgamated with the Seacliff Football Club to form the Brighton and Seacliff Football Club.

A-Grade Premierships

- Mid-Southern Football Association A-Grade (4)
  - 1920
  - 1923
  - 1924
  - 1925
- Glenelg District Football Association A-Grade (1)
  - 1936

==== Seacliff ====
The Seacliff Football Club was formed in 1931 and joined the Glenelg District Football Association. Seacliff competed for five seasons, finishing minor premiers in 1935, until going into recess in 1936. In 1938 Seacliff partnered with Brighton to form the Brighton and Seacliff Football Club.

==== Sturt-Brighton ====
For four seasons during World War II (1942–1945), Brighton and Seacliff combined with Sturt (now Marion) to form Sturt-Brighton. In 1946 both clubs reformed in their own right.

A-Grade Premierships

- Glenelg District Football Association A-Grade (1)
  - 1944
  - 1945

=== Brighton High Old Scholars ===
The Brighton High Old Scholars Football Club (BHOS) was formed in 1968 by a group of ex-Students of Brighton High School and entered the South Australian Amateur Football League A6 competition. Following winning the A6 premiership in 1969, they were promoted to A5 and repeated the premiership win to make their way into A4. BHOS made it three-in-a-row in 1971, winning the A4 premiership and securing their place in A3. BHOS remained in A3 for six seasons before securing promotion through a Grand Final loss to Old Ignatians in 1976. BHOS only lasted for three seasons in A2 before being relegated to A3 for the 1980 season. 1981 saw an A3 wooden spoon and relegation to A4, followed by the wooden spoon in the A4 competition in 1982 to land in A5. An A5 Grand Final loss in 1985 to Salisbury College resulted in promotion to A4 and was directly followed by the A4 premiership in 1986. The following season, BHOS again secured promotion via a losing grand final, this time to Goodwood Saints. BHOS merged with the Brighton Football Club at the end of the 1990 season, after they finished bottom of the A2 competition without winning a game. The new club, named Brighton Districts and Old Scholars, continued in A3 in place of Brighton High Old Scholars.

A-Grade Premierships

- SAAFL A4 (2)
  - 1971
  - 1986
- SAAFL A5 (1)
  - 1970
- SAAFL A6 (1)
  - 1969

== Greatest SFL Team ==
To celebrate the 125th anniversary of the Southern Football League, each club was asked to name their "Greatest Team" whilst participating in the SFL.

Brighton Bombers Football Club's Greatest Team 1997–2010
B:	Damien Nicholls	Hudson Browne	Brad Parkin
HB:	Adam Betterman	Geoff Booth	Adam Waye
C:	Rob Miles	Dale Betterman	Shane Moss
HF:	Matt Trowbridge	Ben Trinne	Brad King
F:	Trevor Rea	Duncan Draper	Joel Tucker Captain
Foll:	Ben Brookman	Mark Jolly	Todd Johnstone
Int:	Randall Lindsay	Leigh Schneebichler	Clint Trinder
Coach:	Ian Cox		

Preceded by Noarlunga; Reynella	SFL Division 1 Premiers; 2002; 2011	Succeeded by Happy Valley; Happy Valley
