= Marion Football Club =

Australian rules football club

Marion

Names
- Full name: Marion Football Club
- Former name: Sturt Football Club (until the 1950s)
- Nickname: Rams
- Club song: We Are The Green & Gold

2026 season
- After finals: Runners Up (D4)
- Home-and-away season: 3rd (14W, 4L)

Club details
- Founded: 1891; 135 years ago
- Colours: Green Gold
- Competition: Adelaide Footy League (Division 3)
- President: Russell Stanborough
- Coach: Sean Bayzand
- Captain(s): Lachie Eichner & John Mitchell
- Premierships: 13 (1920, 1921, 1926, 1931, 1944, 1945, 1951, 1957, 1958, 1967, 2000, 2018, 2025)
- Ground: Marion Oval, Marion

Uniforms
Home

Other information
- Official website: marionfc.com.au

The Marion Football Club is an Australian rules football club first formed in 1891 as the Sturt Football Club (no relation to the SANFL’s Sturt Football Club). In 1912, Sturt joined the Sturt Football Association, playing against the Blackwood, Mitcham, Brighton, Sturt Ramblers and Glenelg Imperials clubs.

In 1920, Sturt joined the Mid-Southern Football Association along with Blackwood and Brighton, winning the Premiership that season. The Mid-Southern Football Association became the Glenelg District Football Association in 1931, with Sturt once again winning the first premiership.

During the Second World War, Sturt combined with the Brighton and Seacliff club from 1942 to 1945, winning two premierships as a combined entity.

In 1956, Sturt was renamed as "Marion Football Club" to avoid confusion with the SANFL team of the same name. Marion continued in the competition known as the Glenelg District Football Association, Glenelg-South-West District Football Association, Glenelg-South Adelaide Football Association and finally the Southern Metropolitan Football League until it folded at the end of the 1986 season.

In 1987, Marion joined the Southern Football League Division 1 competition. In 2018 Marion joined the Adelaide Footy League starting in Division 7. Since then the club has worked its way up to Division 3, winning 2 premierships along the way in 2018 & 2025.

The Marion Rams have produced five Australian Football League (AFL) players. Notable names include Scott Welsh, formerly of the North Melbourne, Adelaide, and Western Bulldogs clubs & Nasiah Wanganeen-Milera who is currently playing for St Kilda.

== A-Grade Premierships ==
- Mid Southern FA (3)
  - 1920, 1921, 1926
- Glenelg DFA (3)
  - 1931, 1944 (as Sturt-Brighton), 1945 (as Sturt-Brighton)
- Glenelg-South-West DFA (3)
  - 1951 (A1), 1957 (A2), 1958 (A1)
- Glenelg-South Adelaide FA (1)
  - 1967 (A2)
- Southern FL (1)
  - 2000
- Adelaide FL (2)
  - 2018 (D7), 2025 (D5)

Preceded by Happy Valley	SFL Division 1 Premiers; 2000	Succeeded by Noarlunga
