= Colonel Light Gardens Football Club =

Australian rules football club

Colonel Light Gardens

Names
- Full name: Colonel Light Gardens Football Club
- Nickname: Lions

2025 season
- After finals: 5th
- Home-and-away season: 5th

Club details
- Founded: 1926; 100 years ago
- Colours
- Competition: Adelaide Footy League
- President: Matt Lemmers
- Coach: Steve Zweck
- Premierships: (1927, 1929, 1932, 1949, 1962, 1983, 1989, 1993, 1995, 2007)
- Ground: Mortlock Park, Colonel Light Gardens

Uniforms
Home

Other information
- Official website: https://clgfc.com.au/

The Colonel Light Gardens Football Club is an Australian Rules football club that has senior men's teams in Division 4, Division 4 Reserves and Division C4 of the Adelaide Footy League. They also have a strong juniors program for both girls and boys. They are known as the 'Lions'.

== History ==
The club was founded by the merger of Colonel Light Western (1927-1930, South Adelaide District & YMCA Association) and Mortlock Park (1927-1930, Mid Southern Association) in 1931. For its first two seasons of playing in the SAAFL, the club applied to join the South Australian National Football League. The club was admitted to the newly formed SA National Junior Football Association before moving back to the SAAFL in 1937.

In 1938, it was represented at state level by Sturt player Gil Langley who was one of the five state players the club produced. The Lions rose to Division 1 and contested the finals three consecutive seasons while the club was also fielding teams in the Sturt District Association.

During the 1960s, Colonel Light Gardens saw a downfall, dropping down to Division 2 and then to Division 4 in the 1970s before moving again to the Glenelg South league in 1976. The Lions remained there until 1986 when it combined with the Kenilworth Football Club to form Kenilworth-Colonel Light and thus going back to the SAAFL. The merger only lasted for five years, with the Lions reverting to Colonel Light Gardens in 1991.

In 1995 it was forced to share its home ground, Mortlock Park, with the Goodwood Indians Baseball Club who had their own facilities on the site, with the Mitcham Council ultimately ceasing the club's uses with the clubrooms for events due to complaints from local residents.

The club has a strong junior player base and still continues to field junior teams in SANFL Juniors and senior teams in the Adelaide Footy League. The strength of the juniors has paid dividends as they move to senior levels with the club being promoted to Division 4 in 2025 after a strong showing in the previous year.

A significant upgrade to the club's shared facilities was announced in 2024. It is expected to attract more female players.

== A-Grade Premierships ==
- 1927 = Mid-Southern Association (as Mortlock Park)
- 1932 = Division 2 (undefeated)
- 1949 = Division 2 (undefeated)
- 1962 = Division 4
- 1983 = Division 2
- 1993 = Division 6
- 1995 = Division 5
- 2007 = Division 7

== Notable players ==
- Sturt and South Australian State representative Gil Langley.
- Magarey Medalist William Keith Dunn.
- Magarey Medalist and All-Australian Mark Naley played junior football at the club.
