= Norwood-North Football Association =

The Norwood-North Football Association (NNFA) was an Australian rules football competition based in the eastern and north-eastern suburbs of Adelaide, South Australia until it folded at the end of the 1977 season. It was formed in 1969 as a merger of the East Torrens Football Association and the North Adelaide District Football Association.

== Member Clubs ==
=== Final Clubs ===
Club	Colours	Nickname	Home Ground	Former League	Est.	Years in NNFA	NNFA Senior Premierships		Fate
Club	Colours	Nickname	Home Ground	Former League	Est.	Years in NNFA	Total	Years	Fate
Albert Sports		Druids	Challa Gardens Primary School, Kilkenny	NADFA	1930s	1969-77	0	–	Formed Adelaide Suburban FA in 1978
Athelstone		Raggies	Max Amber Sportfield, Paradise	ETFA	1904	1969-77	5	1970, 1971, 1975, 1976, 1977	Formed SAFA in 1978
Brompton			Sam Johnson Sportsground, Renown Park	ETFA	1945	1969-77	0	–	Formed Adelaide Suburban FA in 1978
Burnside			Bill Cooper Oval, Newland Park, Erindale	ETFA		1969-77	0	–	Formed SAFA in 1978
Campbelltown-Magill United			Campbelltown Memorial Oval, Paradise	–	1976	1976-77	0	–	Formed SAFA in 1978
Gepps Cross		Rams	Duncan Fraser Reserve, Northfield	NADFA	1952	1969-77	0	–	Formed SAFA in 1978
Hectorville		Hounds	Daly Oval, Hectorville	ETFA	1961	1969-77	2	1969, 1974	Formed SAFA in 1978
Hope Valley	(1969-74)(1975-77)	Demons	Hope Valley Sporting Club, Hope Valley	NADFA	1906	1969-77	0	–	Formed SAFA in 1978
Ingle Farm		Bulldogs	Rowe Park, Ingle Farm	CDFA	1968	1974-77	0	–	Formed SAFA in 1978
Kensington Gardens			Parkinson Oval, Kensington Gardens	ETFA		1969-77	0	–	Formed Adelaide Suburban FA in 1978
Modbury		Double Blues	Modbury Oval, Ridgehaven	NADFA	1862	1969-77	0	–	Formed SAFA in 1978
Norwood Union			Brookway Park, Campbelltown	ETFA	1902	1969-77	0	–	Formed SAFA in 1978
Ovingham United		Cats	Cane Reserve, Prospect	UCFA	1906	1977	0	–	Formed Adelaide Suburban FA in 1978
Para-Houghton			Houghton Memorial Oval, Houghton & Paracombe Recreation Reserve, Paracombe	ETFA	1915	1969-77	0	–	Formed Adelaide Suburban FA in 1978
Pooraka		Bulls	Lindblom Park, Pooraka	CDFA	1920	1976-77	0	–	Formed SAFA in 1978
Taperoo		Roos, Demons	Largs North Oval, Largs North	SAAFL	1969	1975-77	0	–	Formed Adelaide Suburban FA in 1978
Tea Tree Gully		Gullies, Wolves	Pertaringa Oval, Banksia Park	ETFA	1862	1969-77	1	1973	Formed SAFA in 1978
Wingfield Royals		Wolves, Wingies	Eastern Parade Reserve, Ottoway	NADFA	1954	1969-77	1	1972	Formed Adelaide Suburban FA in 1978

=== Former Clubs ===
Club	Colours	Nickname	Home Ground	Former League	Est.	Years in NNFA	NNFA Senior Premierships		Fate
Club	Colours	Nickname	Home Ground	Former League	Est.	Years in NNFA	Total	Years	Fate
Ashton		Saints	Ashton Oval, Ashton	ETFA	1920s	1969-71	0	–	Moved to Hills FL in 1972
Campbelltown			Campbelltown Memorial Oval, Paradise	ETFA	1913	1969-75	0	–	Merged with Magill Royal to form Campbelltown-Magill United in 1976
Eastwood			Carriageway Park (Park 17), Adelaide	ETFA	1930s	1969-76	0	–	Moved to SAAFL in 1977
Greenacres		Dragons	LJ Lewis Reserve, Northfield	NADFA	1967	1969-72	0	–	Moved to SAAFL in 1973
Kersbrook		Blues, Brookers	Kersbrook Soldiers Memorial Park, Kersbrook	ETFA	1912	1969-70	0	–	Moved to Hills FL in 1971
Magill Royal			Murray Park Oval, Magill	ETFA	1913	1969-75	0	–	Merged with Campbelltown to form Campbelltown-Magill United in 1976
Nunga Community				–	1969	1969-73	0	–	Moved to Adelaide Suburban FL in 1974
Salesian Old Collegians		Violet Crumbles	Salesian College, Brooklyn Park	NADFA	1969	1969-72	0	–	Moved to SAAFL in 1973
South Adelaide		Ramblers	Morgan Oval, Adelaide	SMFL	1910s	1969	0	–	Folded after 1969 season
St Raphael's	(1969-72)(1973-76)	Saints	Morgan Oval, Adelaide	NADFA		1969-76	0	–	Moved to SAAFL in 1977
West Croydon		Hawks	Fawk Reserve, Athol Park	NADFA	1961	1969-73	0	–	Moved to SAAFL in 1974

== Disbanding ==
At the end of the 1977 season, the stronger clubs joined the newly formed South Australian Football Association whilst the weaker clubs joined the Adelaide and Suburban Football Association.

=== Clubs to SAFA ===
- Athelstone
- Burnside
- Campbelltown-Magill United
- Gepps Cross
- Hectorville
- Hope Valley
- Ingle Farm
- Modbury
- Norwood Union
- Pooraka
- Tea Tree Gully

=== Clubs to ASFA ===
- Albert Druids
- Brompton
- Kensington Gardens
- Ovingham United
- Para-Houghton
- Taperoo
- Wingfield
- Woodville Royal

== Premierships ==
Year	A-Grade	B-Grade	C-Grade	D-Grade
1969	Hectorville			
1970	Athelstone		Athelstone	
1971	Athelstone		Athelstone	Athelstone
1972	Wingfield	Athelstone		
1973	Tea Tree Gully			
1974	Hectorville			Athelstone
1975	Athelstone	Athelstone		
1976	Athelstone			Athelstone
1977	Athelstone			Athelstone
