= 1946 SAAFL season =

1946 premiership season
- Date: 27 April - 21 September
- Premiers: A1: Woodville; A2: Prince Alfred O.C.
- Minor premiers: A1: University; A2: Goodwood
- Wooden spooners: A1: Railways' Institute; A2: Scotch O.C.
- Best and fairest: A1 (Hone Medal): Harold Harris (Colonel Light Gardens) and Don Russell (Exeter); A2 (Chambers Medal): Gordon Gratton (Scotch O.C.)
- Leading goalkicker: A1: Sid Maley (Walkerville) 66 goals A2:

The 1946 SAAFL season was the 28th season of the South Australian Amateur Football League (SAAFL) having been revived after going into recess since 1941.

The season commenced on 27 April and concluded on 21 September.

Prince Alfred Old Collegians' reformed after having gone into recess since 1940.

Underdale United, Y.M.C.A. and Combined Banks did not reform. Payneham B returned to the East Torrens Association. Kelvinator (playing at Weigall Oval) transferred from Adelaide & Suburban, where it had played the last three seasons.

Affiliated teams were: King's Old Collegians, University, University B, Semaphore Central, Walkerville, St. Peter's Old Collegians, Teachers' College, Kenilworth, Railways' Institute, Payneham, Colonel Light Gardens, Exeter, Prince Alfred Old Collegians, Goodwood, Scotch Old Collegians, Pulteney Old Scholars, Woodville and Alberton Church United.

== A1 ==
=== Ladder ===
| Pos | Team | Pld | W | L | D | PF | PA | Pts |
|---|---|---|---|---|---|---|---|---|
| 1 | University | 16 | 14 | 2 | 0 | 1495 | 946 | 28 |
| 2 | Woodville | 16 | 12 | 4 | 0 | 1517 | 1049 | 24 |
| 3 | Colonel Light Gardens | 16 | 10 | 5 | 1 | 1183 | 1020 | 21 |
| 4 | Semaphore Central | 16 | 10 | 6 | 0 | 1362 | 1233 | 20 |
| 5 | Exeter | 16 | 8 | 7 | 1 | 1190 | 1143 | 17 |
| 6 | Walkerville | 16 | 8 | 8 | 0 | 1681 | 1348 | 16 |
| 7 | Payneham | 16 | 7 | 9 | 0 | 1395 | 1330 | 14 |
| 8 | St. Peter's O.C. | 16 | 1 | 15 | 0 | 1014 | 1823 | 2 |
| 9 | Railways' Institute | 16 | 1 | 15 | 0 | 484 | 1419 | 2 |

=== Finals ===
==== Semi Finals ====
| | Semi-finals |
| Saturday, 7 September | University 10.13 | def. by | Colonel Light Gardens 12.12 | Payneham Oval |
| Saturday, 7 September | Woodville 12.18 | def. | Semaphore Central 10.13 | Goodwood Oval |

==== Final ====
Saturday, 14 September | Woodville | def. | Colonel Light Gardens | Unley Oval
13.15 | Q1; Q2; Q3; Final | 11.9 | Umpires: L.R. Cooper boundary: E.R. Guy, J.B. Lamprell goal: P. Riley, R. Drage

==== Challenge Final ====
Saturday, 21 September | University | def. by | Woodville | Alberton Oval
9.5 (59) | Q1; Q2; Q3; Final | 8.13 (61)
Coulis 3, Davies 3, Eldridge 2, Hosking | Goals | Wiles 2, Hickman, Kent, Skelly, Bunyan, Burns, Garland

== A2 ==
=== Ladder ===
| Pos | Team | Pld | W | L | D | PF | PA | Pts |
|---|---|---|---|---|---|---|---|---|
| 1 | Goodwood | 18 | 15 | 3 | 0 | 1865 | 10 5 | 30 |
| 2 | King's O.C. | 18 | 14 | 4 | 0 | 1681 | 1135 | 28 |
| 3 | Prince Alfred O.C. | 18 | 14 | 4 | 0 | 1743 | 1249 | 28 |
| 4 | University B | 18 | 11 | 7 | 0 | 1445 | 1140 | 22 |
| 5 | Kelvinator | 18 | 10 | 8 | 0 | 1257 | 1209 | 20 |
| 6 | Alberton Church United | 18 | 10 | 8 | 0 | 1181 | 1218 | 20 |
| 7 | Kenilworth | 18 | 8 | 10 | 0 | 1241 | 1490 | 16 |
| 8 | Teachers' College | 18 | 4 | 14 | 0 | 961 | 1486 | 8 |
| 9 | Pulteney O.S. | 18 | 2 | 16 | 0 | 1131 | 1845 | 4 |
| 10 | Scotch O.C. | 18 | 2 | 16 | 0 | 1035 | 1733 | 4 |

=== Finals ===
==== Semi Finals ====
| | Semi-finals |
| Saturday, 7 September | Goodwood 7.11 | def. by | Prince Alfred O.C. 14.9 | Mortlock Park Oval |
| Saturday, 7 September | King's O.C. 22.11 | def. | University B 13.18 | South Park (Kenilworth ground) |

==== Final ====
Saturday, 14 September | Prince Alfred O.C. | def. | King's O.C. | Mortlock Park Oval
11.13 | Q1; Q2; Q3; Final | 10.10 | Umpires: C.G.R. Hall boundary: J.W. Gower, E. Marriott goal: D. Groves, V. O'Malley

==== Challenge Final ====
Saturday, 21 September | Goodwood | def. by | Prince Alfred O.C. | Mortlock Park Oval
10.11 (71) | Q1; Q2; Q3; Final | 12.13 (85)
Harrison 2, Fagg 2, Aistrope, Leith, Gearen, Schneider, Longman, Maxwell | Goals | Dawkins 4, C. Webb 3, K. Webb 2, C. Parham, Morris, Basheer

== Inter Grade ==
With the absence of interstate matches, the League held an inter-grade match with teams representing the A1 and A2 competitions at Goodwood Oval on 31 August

Saturday, 31 August | A1 | def. by | A2 | Goodwood Oval
10.14 (74) | Q1; Q2; Q3; Final | 14.21 (105) | Umpires: L.R. Cooper boundary: C.G.R. Hall and E. Marriott goal: V. O'Malley and D. Corston
Halliday 2, Harrold 2, Harper, Cobb, Kay, Mehan, Coulis, Holden | Goals | Wood 8, Longman 2, Giuyas, Solomon, Gratton, Hooper
Hay, Harris, Ferguson, Cobb, Halliday, Kay | Best | Wood, Giuyas, Solomon, Walker, Martin, Morrison
