= 1926 SAAFL season =

Australian Rules Football SA Amateur season

1926 premiership season
- Date: 1 May - 18 September
- Teams: 8
- Premiers: University
- Runners-up: Semaphore Central
- Minor premiers: University
- Wooden spooners: Y.M.C.A.
- Best and fairest: George Murray (Kenilworth)
- Leading goalkicker: W.R. 'Jogger' James (University) 74 Goals

The 1926 SAAFL season was the 12th season of the South Australian Amateur Football League (SAAFL).

This is the season in which the first South Australian old scholars football club joined the League. Prince Alfred Old Collegians played at the Police Ground (Park 19), before moving to the school oval in 1927. Marryatville from the East Torrens Football Association also joined, they played at Victoria Park. Goodwood left the competition for the first of three times. Teachers Training College used the Wayville Showgrounds as a home ground for this season.

== Ladder ==
Pos	Team	Pld	W	L	D	Pts
1	University	14	13	1	0	26
2	Semaphore Central	14	12	2	0	24
3	Kenilworth	14	10	4	0	20
4	Kingswood	14	8	6	0	16
5	Marryatville	14	6	8	0	12
6	Teachers Training College	14	4	10	0	8
7	Prince Alfred Old Collegians	14	2	12	0	4
8	Y.M.C.A	14	1	13	0	2

== Minor Rounds ==
=== Round 1 ===
	Round 1
1 May	Kenilworth	v	Kingswood	South Park
1 May	Teachers' College	v	Y.M.C.A.	Wayville Showground
1 May	University	v	Semaphore Central	University Oval
1 May	Marryatville	v	P.A.C. Old Collegians	Victoria Park

== Finals ==
=== Semi Finals ===
	Semi-finals
Saturday, 4 September	University 15.13	def.	Kenilworth 14.14	Glenelg Oval
Saturday, 4 September	Semaphore Central 11.6	def.	Kingswood 8.15	University Oval

=== Final ===
	Final
Saturday, 11 September	University 5.15	def. by	Semaphore Central 8.14	Unley Oval

=== Challenge Final ===
	Challenge Final
Saturday, 18 September	University 9.13	def.	Semaphore Central 7.13	Norwood Oval

== Representative ==
The Metropolitan Amateur Football Association proposed to play an interstate match against the South Australian Amateur Football League in Adelaide on Monday, June 7.

Interstate Match
Monday, 7 June	SAAFL	def. by	MAFA	University Oval
3.2; 6.6; 10.10; 16.14 (110)	Q1; Q2; Q3; Final	5.5; 11.5; 15.8; 17.10 (112)
Hone 5, Mitton 3, Blunt 2, Clarke 2, McRae 2, King, Krome	Goals	Vickers 4, Staley 3, McMillan 2, Lundy 2, Dakin 2, Thackeray 2, Petebell, Dalton
Blunt, King, Hone, Sawyer, McRae, Krome	Best	Staley, Profitt, MacDonald, MacMillian, Petebell, Vickers, Vine, Thackeray
