= 1938 SAAFL season =

1938 premiership season
- Date: 23 April - 24 September
- Premiers: A1: Semaphore Central; A2: Payneham
- Minor premiers: A1: Semaphore Central; A2: Payneham
- Wooden spooners: A1: Alberton Church United; A2: Combined Banks
- Best and fairest: A1 (Hone Medal): L. A. Reeves (Kenilworth); A2 (Chambers Medal): L. E. Giersch (Teachers' College)
- Leading goalkicker: A1: Johnson (Semaphore Central) 110 goals A2: Footer (Railways Institute) 100 goals

The 1938 SAAFL season was the 24th season of the South Australian Amateur Football League (SAAFL).

The season commenced on 23 April and concluded on 24 September.

Two A1 clubs left in 1938, West Adelaide United having been expelled from the Amateur League at the end of 1937, leading to the club disbanding. The other club being Eastwood Rechabite, transferring to the East Torrens Football Association. The 1937 A2 Finalists took their place, Alberton Church United and Colonel Light Gardens. Due to two vacancies in A2, applications for affiliation were received from Grange, Payneham, Riverside and University B. The successful applicants were Payneham, coming off of 52 successive wins in the East Torrens Football Association, home ground at Payneham Oval. The other being University B, playing at Urrbrae, having competed in Adelaide Students' Football Association. Alberton Church used Woodville Oval as its home ground.

== A1 ==
Prince Alfred Old Collegians, Semaphore Central, St. Peter's Old Collegians, university, Underdale, Exeter, Kenilworth, Walkerville, Alberton Church United, Colonel Light Gardens.

=== Ladder ===
Pos	Team	Pld	W	L	D	PF	PA	Pts
1	Semaphore Central	18	14	4	0	1980	1204	28
2	Exeter	18	14	4	0	1711	1233	28
3	Colonel Light Gardens	18	14	4	0	1545	1192	28
4	Underdale	18	13	5	0	1855	1372	26
5	University	18	11	7	0	1808	1460	22
6	St. Peter's O.C.	18	7	11	0	1459	1658	14
7	Walkerville	18	5	13	0	1386	1772	10
8	Prince Alfred Old Collegians	18	5	13	0	1429	1867	10
9	Kenilworth	18	4	14	0	1205	1890	8
10	Alberton Church United	18	3	15	0	1075	1805	6

=== Finals ===
==== Semi-Finals ====
	Semi-finals
Saturday, 10 September	Semaphore Central 7.8 (50)	def.	Colonel Light Gardens 6.8 (44)	Prospect Oval
Saturday, 10 September	Exeter 7.14 (56)	def. by	Underdale 20.10 (130)	Thebarton Oval

==== Final ====
Sir George Murray Shield
Saturday, 17 September	Semaphore Central	def.	Underdale	Alberton Oval
4.0; 9.4; 13.8; 14.12 (96)	Q1; Q2; Q3; Final	2.3; 4.5; 6.7; 10.10 (70)
Johnson 8, Donnellan 2, Holman 2, Steel, Dodson	Goals	Spain 4, Coulter 2, Molan, Reid, McHugh, Conroy
Holt, Hosking, Johnson, Holman, Wells, Dodson, McLean	Best	Barnden, Coulter Molan, Baughan Nichols, Matson, Wilson

== A2 ==
Scotch Old Collegians, Railways Institute, King's Old Collegians, Pulteney Old Scholars, Teachers' College, Y.M.C.A., Banks, Christian Brothers' Old Collegians, Payneham, University B.

=== Ladder ===
Pos	Team	Pld	W	L	D	PF	PA	Pts
1	Payneham	18	18	0	0	2325	805	36
2	S.A. Railways Institute	18	16	2	0	2115	1018	32
3	Teachers' College	18	12	6	0	1710	1919	24
4	Christian Brothers Old Collegians	18	11	7	0	1595	1538	22
5	King's Old Collegians	18	9	9	0	1966	1571	18
6	Scotch Old Collegians	18	9	9	0	1361	1921	18
7	University B	18	7	11	0	1289	1679	14
8	Pulteney O.S.	18	5	13	0	1311	1802	10
9	Y.M.C.A	18	2	16	0	985	1890	4
10	Combined Banks	18	1	17	0	900	1844	2

=== Finals ===
==== Semi-Finals ====
	Semi-finals
Saturday, 10 September	Payneham 14.13	def.	Teachers' College 11.13	Woodville Oval
Saturday, 17 September	Railways Institute 15.8	def.	Christian Brothers' Old Collegians 12.20	Woodville Oval

==== Final ====
Saturday, 24 September	Payneham	def.	Railways Institute	Alberton Oval
1.0; 4.3; 7.8; 11.12 (78)	Q1; Q2; Q3; Final	8.2; 8.2; 9.3; 10.5 (65)
S. LeCornu 2, A. Mundy 2, Hardy 2, Williams 2, Ware, Edwards, Keelan	Goals	R. Bertram 2, Footer 2, Treloar 2, Quinlan, A. Bertram, Oliver, Craig

== Representative ==
=== vs Camberwell (Victorian Football Association) ===
The Amateur League played an exhibition match at Adelaide Oval on Tuesday 9 August against Camberwell, they played under the Victorian Football Association rules.

Tuesday, 9 August (2:30 pm)	S.A.A.F.L.	def. by	Camberwell	Adelaide Oval (crowd: 1500)
2.1 (13); 7.3 (45); 9.6 (60); 15.10 (100)	Q1; Q2; Q3; Final	10.3 (63); 14.5 (89); 20.14 (134); 22.18 (150)	Umpires: F.G.H. Davis
Lamprell 6, Roach 4, Forrester 4, Holt, McCallum, Mills, Holden	Goals	Nash 9, Davidson 4, Bond 3, Anderson 2, Keck, Hillard, Lenne, Newton

=== All-Australian Amateur Football Carnival ===
The second Australian Amateur Football Carnival was held at York Park in Launceston from 15 to 20 August. Six states/territories were represented Australian Capital Territory, New South Wales, South Australia, Tasmania, Victoria and Western Australia. The Australian Capital Territory and New South Wales teams were drawn from their respective National Football Leagues.

South Australia - manager H.V. Millard
Clarrie Adcock	King's O.C.
John Bertram	St. Peter's O.C.
George Brock	Exeter
Michael Brookman	St. Peter's O.C.
George Corby	Alberton Church United
Arthur Dawkins	Prince Alfred O.C.
Les Giersch	Teachers' College
Ivan Hooper	Pulteney O.S.
Arthur Inglis	Semaphore Central
Harold Jarvis	Colonel Light Gardens
Pat Kleinschmidt	University
Gil Langley	Colonel Light Gardens
Bob Lee (capt.)	St. Peter's O.C.
Roger MacIlwain	Scotch O.C.
Brian Magarey	University
Ian McLeod	S.A. Railways' Institute
Frank Nichols	Underdale
Geoff Page	University
William Powell	Exeter
Owen Quinn	Underdale
Harry Vincent	Exeter
Len Wells (vice captain)	Semaphore Central
R.A. Whitrow	Kenilworth
Gordon Whittaker	Payneham
