= 1915 SAAFL season =

1915 premiership season
- Date: 1 May - 28 August
- Teams: 8
- Premiers: Kingswood
- Minor premiers: Kingswood
- Wooden spooners: St. Peters College
- Best and fairest: C.E. ('Nip') Pellow, University

The 1915 SAAFL season was the 5th season of the South Australian Amateur Football League (SAAFL).

The 1915 season commenced on 1 May and concluded on 28 August.

Inaugural member St. Bartholomew went into recess and did not reappear until 1924 in the United Church Association. The League was reduced to 8 teams. It was suggested for the first time that players wear numbers on the guernseys so the spectators could identify the players, this recommendation was not taken up until 1924.

With the increasing concern over the state of the War, it was decided that the finals when only two teams (University and Prince Alfred College) had completed their minor round matches.

This season has the first reference to the Naylor Medal (named after Professor Darnley Naylor, the SAAFL President) for the best player in the SAAFL.

== Ladder ==
It was decided on a 7-2 vote that as Kingswood had a much better percentage than University, it would be awarded the minor premiership.

Pos	Team	Pld	W	L	D	PF	PA	Pts
2	University	12	10	2	0	781	425	20
1	Kingswood	11	9	2	0	830	393	18
3	St. Francis Xavier	11	8	3	0	614	490	16
4	Semaphore Central	11	6	4	1	588	485	13
5	Prince Alfred College	12	5	6	1	521	565	11
6	Glenferrie	11	3	8	0	462	581	6
7	Kenilworth	11	2	9	0	320	551	4
8	St. Peters College	11	1	10	0	345	993	2

== Finals ==
=== Semi Finals ===
	Semi-finals
Saturday, 21 August	Kingswood 11.11 (77)	def.	St. Francis Xavier 6.9 (45)	University Oval
Saturday, 14 August	University 5.7 (37)	def. by	Semaphore Central 7.10 (52)	Kingswood Ground

=== Final ===
Final
Saturday, 28 August	Kingswood	def.	Semaphore Central	St Peter's College Oval
8.11 (59)	Q1; Q2; Q3; Final	5.11 (41)
