= North Adelaide District Football Association =

Former football competition in northern Adelaide, Australia

The North Adelaide District Football Association (NADFA) was an Australian rules football competition based in the northern and north-eastern suburbs of Adelaide, South Australia until it merged with the East Torrens Football Association to form the Norwood-North Football Association at the end of the 1968 season. It was formed in 1921 under the patronage of the North Adelaide Football Club with complete control over its own affairs.

== History ==
1921 - Inaugural six Clubs - Abattoirs (based at Gepps Cross), Gaza (Founded in 1903 and based at Klemzig), Islington United, Mitcham (Founded in 1907 and based at Hawthorn Oval), North Adelaide Ramblers, Walkerville (Founded in 1901). Mitcham defeated North Adelaide Ramblers for the premiership at Prospect Oval.

1926 - The following ten teams competed: Prospect, Gaza, North Adelaide Ramblers, Walkerville, Chicago, Hope Valley, Athelstone, North Adelaide Juniors, Northfield, and Salisbury. The last three named are new teams to the association.

The association came into controversy in 1927 when a player, J. Warming, was not permitted to play for league club West Adelaide due to a 12-month suspension received for striking an umpire whilst playing within the North Adelaide District Association.

1929 - The eight teams that competed: Prospect, Gaza, North Adelaide Ramblers, Walkerville, Chicago, Hope Valley, North Adelaide Centrals and Broadview. After three seasons Salisbury, twice as runner up, rejoined the Gawler Football Association.

1930 - Annual Report it was reported the registered number of players was 294 for eight clubs in 1929 against 357 in the previous season for 10 teams.

1938 - Finals Series - Excelsior (Minor Premiers) defeated Broadview in the second semi-final and won the right to play in the grand final. But Excelsior had played a man who had been named as reserve in the West Torrens B team. Contending that the Excelsior man was ineligible, Broadview lodged a protest with the North Adelaide Association. It was dismissed.
They appealed to the South Australian Junior Football Union. The appeal was upheld. The North Adelaide Association then appealed to the South Australian Football League against the Union decision, but their appeal against the appeal decision was dismissed. Prepared to see the thing out to the bitter end, North Adelaide Association officials decided to meet the afternoon before the match. Either the second semi-final would have to be replayed, or the losers would be declared the winners. Broadview, however, having constitutionally established its point, let officials know before the meeting that the result of the match with Excelsior should stand. Kilburn then defeated Broadview in the Preliminary Final on 17 September.

1940 - Teams from the RAAF at Parafield and Adelaide entered the competition joining Kilburn, Broadview, North Adelaide Ramblers, North Adelaide Centrals, Prospect, Gaza, Broadview Colts. The Abattoirs Club had disbanded. The RAAF Parafield Team qualified for the Semi-Finals. The Premiership table as at the end of the minor round was: Broadview 30 pts, Kilburn 28, North Adelaide Centrals 24, R.A.A.F. (Parafield) 22, North Adelaide Ramblers 16, R.A.A.F (Adelaide) 12, Gaza 8, Prospect 8, Broadview Colts Nil.

1942 - Competition went into recess during the remainder of World War II and resumed following the end.

1947 - Eight teams competed - Thompson Memorial, Walkerville B, Broadview; Kilburn, Modbury, Gaza, Prospect, Abattoirs.

In March 1960 an application was received from Central Districts Club for affiliation with the NA Association. Their delegate stated they were seeking league status, and to do this, they had to field two teams as well as Colts. Fifteen of their Senior Colts would be lost to them this year, because they were too old. The club had adequate dressing sheds and toilet facilities, and one of the best turfed ovals in Australia.

1961 - Grade "A1" Clubs - Broadview, Gaza, Gepps Cross, Happy Valley, NYCW, North Adelaide Centrals, Prospect and Thompson Clubs. (8 teams) The Grade "A2" clubs - Broadview, Gaza, Gepps Cross, Happy Valley. NYCW, Walkerville, Super Elliott and Wingfield. (8 teams)

== Clubs ==
=== Final ===
Club	Colours	Nickname	Home Ground	Former League	Est.	Known years in NADFA	Known NADFA Senior Premierships		Fate
Club	Colours	Nickname	Home Ground	Former League	Est.	Known years in NADFA	Total	Years	Fate
Albert Sports		Druids	Mary Lee Park, North Adelaide	AMFL	1930s	1968	0	-	Formed Norwood-North FA in 1969
Gepps Cross		Magpies	Duncan Fraser Reserve, Northfield	–	1952	1952-1968	1	1965	Formed Norwood-North FA in 1969
Greenacres		Dragons	LJ Lewis Reserve, Northfield	–	1965	1965-1968	0	-	Formed Norwood-North FA in 1969
Hope Valley (Hope Valley United 1949)	(1922-29)(1949-74)	Demons	Hope Valley Sporting Club, Hope Valley	NEHFA, ETFA	1906	1922-1929, 1949-1968	1	1954	Returned to North Eastern Hills FA in 1930. Formed Norwood-North FA in 1969
Modbury		Double Blues	Modbury Oval, Ridgehaven	ETFA	1862	1947-1950, 1954-1958, 1963-1968	3	1967, 1968	Ftmoormed Norwood-North FA in 1969
Pooraka (Abbatoirs 1921-67)		Bulls	Lindblom Park, Pooraka	–	1920	1921-1968	0	-	Formed Norwood-North FA in 1969
St Raphaels		Saints	Morgan Oval, Adelaide	AMFL	1947	1968	0	-	Formed Norwood-North FA in 1969
West Croydon			Fawk Reserve, Athol Park	–	1961	1965-1968	0	-	Formed Norwood-North FA in 1969
Wingfield		Wolves, Wingies	Eastern Parade Reserve, Ottoway	–	1954	1954-1968	2	1957, 1958	Formed Norwood-North FA in 1969

=== Former ===
Club	Colours	Nickname	Home Ground	Former League	Est.	Known years in NADFA	Known NADFA Senior Premierships		Fate
Club	Colours	Nickname	Home Ground	Former League	Est.	Known years in NADFA	Total	Years	Fate
Athelstone		Raggies	Foxfield Oval, Athelstone	ETFA	1904	1926-1928?	0	-	1929-35 unknown. Re-formed in East Torrens FA in 1936.
ANZ Bank			LeFevre Park, North Adelaide	–	1958	1958-1959	0	-	Moved to Glenelg-South West District FA in 1960
British Tube Mills				–	1941	1941	0	-	Folded after 1941 season
Broadview		Tigers	Broadview Oval, Broadview	–	1928	1928-1963	4	1930, 1948, 1954, 1963	Moved to SAAFL in 1964
Broadview Colts		Tigers	Broadview Oval, Broadview	–	1928	1940	0	-	?
Brunswick			Park 21 (Mirnu Wirra), Adelaide	–		?-1951	1	1949	Moved to Glenelg-South West District FA in 1960
Central District		Bulldogs	Elizabeth Oval, Elizabeth	–	1960	1960	0	-	Formed Central District FA in 1961
College Park						1949	1	1949	Folded
Enfield						1952-1953	1	1953	Folded
Excelsior						1937-1938	0	-	Folded
Ferryden Park	Red and black	Rovers	Ferryden Park Reserve, Ferryden Park	–	1964	1965-1967	1	1965	Moved to SAAFL in 1968
Gaza		Eagles	Klemzig Oval, Klemzig	–	1921	1921-1961	2	1926, 1960	Moved to SAAFL in 1962
Harris Scarfe						1930 - ?	0	-	Folded
Islington United						1921-1924	1	1922	Folded
Kangaroos						1922	0	-	Folded
Kilburn (Chicago 1925-32)		Chics	Oval on site of Islington Rail Workshops, Kilburn	–	1923	1925-1957	12	1928, 1933, 1934, 1935, 1937, 1938, 1939, 1940, 1946, 1947, 1956, 1957	Moved to SAAFL in 1958
Mitcham			Price Memorial Oval, Hawthorn	USFA	1908	1921	1	1921	Moved to Mid-Southern FA in 1922
North Adelaide Central						1935-?	4	1941, 1950, 1953, 1956	Folded
North Adelaide Colts						1938	0	-	Folded
North Adelaide Juniors						1926-?	0	-	Folded
North Adelaide Ramblers						1921-1941	1	1929	Folded
Northfield						1926-?	0	-	Folded
Prospect	Dark with light band			YMCAFA		1923-1964	6	1923, 1924, 1925, 1927, 1936, 1946	Folded after 1964 season
RAAF				–	1941	1941	0	-	Folded
RAAF Adelaide				–	1940	1940	0	-	Folded
RAAF Parafield				–	1940	1940	0	-	Folded
Royal Park		Roosters	Carnegie South Reserve, Royal Park	PADFA	pre 1923	1952-1968	0	-	Moved to Adelaide Metropolitan FL in 1967
SA Central						1936-1950	0	-	Folded
Salisbury		Magpies	Salisbury Oval, Salisbury	GDFA	1883	1926-1928	0	-	Returned to Gawler & District FA in 1929
St Dominics (North Adelaide YCW 1954-61)	Red and black		St Dominic's Oval, North Adelaide		1940s	1954-1962	0	-	Moved to SAAFL in 1963
Super Elliott						1948-1954?	0	-	Folded
Tea Tree Gully		Gullies, Wolves	Pertaringa Oval, Banksia Park	ETFA	1862	1955-1956	0	-	Returned to East Torrens FA in 1957
Thompson Memorial						1947-?	7	1950, 1951, 1952, 1955, 1958, 1964, 1966	Folded
Walkerville	(1921-52)(1953-54)(1961)		Walkerville Oval, Walkerville	SAAFL	1901	1921-1935, 1947-1954, 1961	3	1931, 1932, 1963	Moved to SAAFL in 1936. Fielded B-grade team in NADFA from 1947-54 and in 1961.
Woodville North						?-1959-?	1	1959	Folded
Woodville Gardens						1963	0	-	Folded

== Premierships ==
Year	A1	A2
1921	Mitcham	
1922	Islington United	
1923	Prospect	
1924	Prospect	
1925	Prospect	
1926	Gaza	
1927	Prospect	
1928	Chicago	
1929	North Adelaide Ramblers	
1930	Broadview	
1931	Walkerville	
1932	Walkerville	
1933	Kilburn	
1934	Kilburn	
1935	Kilburn	
1936	Prospect	
1937	Kilburn	
1938	Kilburn	
1939	Kilburn	
1940	Kilburn	
1941	North Adelaide Central	
1942-45	In Recess	
1946	Kilburn	
1947	Kilburn	
1948	Broadview	
1949	Brunswick	College Park
1950	Thompson Memorial	North Adelaide Central
1951	Thompson Memorial	Gaza
1952	Thompson Memorial	Super Elliott
1953	Enfield	North Adelaide Central (undefeated)
1954	Broadview	Hope Valley
1955	Thompson Memorial	
1956	Kilburn	North Adelaide Central (undefeated)
1957	Kilburn	Wingfield
1958	Thompson Memorial	Wingfield
1959	North Adelaide Y.C.W.	Woodville North
1960	North Adelaide Y.C.W.	Gaza
1961	Prospect	Walkerville
1962	Prospect	St Dominics
1963	Broadview	Modbury
1964	Thompson Memorial	
1965	Gepps Cross	Ferryden Park
1966	Thompson Memorial	Thompson Memorial
1967	Modbury	
1968	Modbury	

== Northern Adelaide District Football A1 Grade premierships by club ==
Club	Premierships	Premiership Season
Broadview	4	1930,1948,1954,1963
Brunswick	1	1949
Chicago (Kilburn)	1	1928
Enfield	1	1953
Gaza	1	1926
Gepps Cross	1	1965
Islington United	1	1922
Kilburn	11	1933,1934,1935,1937,1938,1939,1940,1946,1947,1956,1957
Mitcham	1	1921
Modbury	2	1967,1968
North Adelaide Central	1	1941
North Adelaide Ramblers	1	1929
North Adelaide Y.C.W.	2	1959,1960
Prospect	7	1923,1924,1925,1927,1936,1961,1962
Thompson Memorial	7	1950,1951,1952,1955,1958,1964,1966
Walkerville	2	1931,1932

Notes:
1962 Premiers - Unknown

== Leader Medallists ==
The Leader Medal was awarded for the fairest and most brilliant footballer in the North Adelaide DFA each season.

- 1968 - Dave (Doc) Woollard (Thompson)

=== Other Grades ===
==== A1 ====
- 1963 - Brian Wells (Broadview)
- 1968 - K. Hopkins (Wingfield)

==== A2 ====
- 1968 - A. Underwood (Pooraka)

==== B-Grade ====
- 1968 - R. Furler (Adult Deaf)
