= 1920 SAAFL season =

1920 premiership season
- Date: 1 May - 11 September
- Teams: 8
- Premiers: University
- Minor premiers: University
- Wooden spooners: Prince Alfred College

The 1920 SAAFL Season was the 6th season of the South Australian Amateur Football League (SAAFL).

The 1920 season commenced on 1 May and concluded on 11 September.

Inaugural member St. Francis Xavier did not form a team (but reappeared in the Catholic Association in 1923), Kenilworth re-applied but were refused because of an apparent outstanding debt from 1915, and played instead in the Adelaide Football Association along with University B, Adelaide High, C.B.C. and Goodwood A.N.A. et al. The League received applications from Prospect, East Adelaide (formerly in the Adelaide Association) and Grange (formerly in the United Suburban Association), the latter two being admitted. Prospect played the 1920 season in the YMCA Association. East Adelaide's ground is not known, but Grange played at Grange Oval, and before the season merged with Henley Beach to form Henley and Grange.

== During the season ==
A match between University and Prince Alfred College on University Oval had to be abandoned just after half time when a heavy downpour flooded the oval. The match was awarded to University as it was leading at the time.

In another match, between Semaphore Central and Kingswood, at three-quarter time the score was Semaphore 3.5 to Kingswood 3.4. However it was discovered Kingswood had nineteen men on the field, and so its score to that point was cancelled. Semaphore thus began the last quarter leading 3.5 to nil. However, Kingswood were able to kick five straight goals in the last quarter and won the match by one point. 5.0 to 4.5.

== Ladder ==
Pos	Team	Pld	W	L	Pts
1	University	15	12	3	24
2	Henley and Grange	15	12	3	24
3	Glenferrie	15	10	5	20
4	Kingswood	15	9	6	18
5	Semaphore Central	15	9	6	18
6	St. Peters College	15	3	12	6
7	East Adelaide	15	3	12	6
8	Prince Alfred College	15	2	13	4

== Finals ==
=== Semi Finals ===
	Semi-finals
Saturday, 21 August	University	def.	Glenferrie
Saturday, 21 August	Henley and Grange 5.18	def.	Kingswood 5.11	,

=== Final ===
Final
Saturday, 11 September (3:00 pm)	University	def.	Henley and Grange	University Oval
2.1; 4.8; 6.10; 10.18 (78)	Q1; Q2; Q3; Final	0.5; 0.5; 2.6; 2.11 (23)
Fox 3, Finney 2, Swann, Summer, Prest, Ashton, Hone	Goals	O'Grady 2
Prest, Finey, Simmons, White, Jeffrey, Leditschke	Best	W. Mair, O'Grady, Taylor, Oswald, Monten, Johnston, Johns
