= 1921 SAAFL season =

1921 premiership season
- Date: 7 May - 17 September
- Teams: 8
- Premiers: University
- Runners-up: Prospect
- Minor premiers: University
- Wooden spooners: Prince Alfred College

The 1921 SAAFL season was the 7th season of the South Australian Amateur Football League (SAAFL).

The 1921 season commenced on 7 May and concluded on 17 September.

Prospect, who had previously applied in 1911, 1912 and 1920, was at last accepted. Prospect replaced East Adelaide who moved to the YMCA Football Association.

== Ladder ==
Pos	Team	Pld	W	L	D	Pts
1	University	14	13	1	0	26
2	Prospect	14	9	5	0	18
3	Semaphore Central	14	9	5	0	18
4	Kingswood	14	8	6	0	16
5	Henley & Grange	14	6	8	0	12
6	St. Peters College	14	4	10	0	8
7	Glenferrie	14	3	10	1	7
8	Prince Alfred College	14	3	10	1	7

== Finals ==
=== Semi Finals ===
	Semi-finals
Saturday, 3 September	University 10.13	def.	Semaphore Central 8.7	Prospect Oval
Saturday, 3 September	Prospect 13.11	def.	Kingswood 11.12	University Oval

=== Final ===
	Final
Saturday, 17 September	University 9.10	def.	Prospect 7.11	Alberton Oval
