= 1941 SAAFL season =

1941 premiership season
- Date: 26 April - 6 September
- Premiers: A1: Exeter; A2: Woodville
- Minor premiers: A1: Exeter; A2: Woodville
- Wooden spooners: A1: Payneham; A2: Teachers' College
- Best and fairest: A1 (Hone Certificate): R. Kendle (Payneham); A2 (Chambers Certificate): Robert Pelham (Goodwood) and Whelan (Kenilworth)

The 1941 SAAFL season was the 27th season of the South Australian Amateur Footballl League (SAAFL).

The season commenced on 26 April and concluded on 6 September.

The B teams of Payneham and University withdrew, as well as St. Peter's O.C. University B and St. Peter's O.C. both fielded their teams in the Students Association. While Alberton Church United, Combined Banks, King's O.C., Underdale and Y.M.C.A. went into recess until the war finished. Prince Alfred O.C. and Pulteney O.S. combined to form Collegians, and Goodwood were re-admitted.

This left only 12 teams, the league separated them with 6 in each grade. A1 containing Exeter, Semaphore Central, University, Railways' Institute, Walkerville, and Payneham. A2 containing Kenilworth, Woodville, Teachers' College, Colonel Light Gardens, Collegians, and Goodwood. Each team played each other three times during the minor rounds.

== A1 ==
=== Ladder ===
Pos	Team	Pld	W	L	D	PF	PA	Pts
1	Exeter	15	13	2	0	1497	1029	26
2	University	15	10	4	1	1545	1315	21
3	Semaphore Central	15	9	6	0	1530	1306	18
4	S.A. Railways Institute	15	7	6	2	1543	1530	16
5	Walkerville	15	3	11	1	1199	1644	7
6	Payneham	15	1	14	0	1413	1903	2

=== Finals ===
==== Semi Finals ====
	Semi-finals
Saturday, 23 August (2:45 pm)	Exeter 14.10	def.	Semaphore Central 10.13	Woodville Oval
Saturday, 23 August (2:45 pm)	University 12.12	def.	Railways' Institute 14.19	Mortlock Park Oval

==== Final ====
Saturday, 6 September	Exeter	def.	Railways' Institute	Woodville Oval
10.16 (76)	Q1; Q2; Q3; Final	8.6 (54)	Umpires: G.R. Allen boundary: E.C. Gyss and R.A. Vardon
Hay 4, Janke 2, Doyle, Sangster, Reinberg	Goals	McKnight 5, Hobbs 2, Torney
Reinberg, Moon, Russell, Montgomery, Calliman, Sangster	Best	Hobbs, King, Stephens, Hill, McKnight

== A2 ==
=== Ladder ===
Pos	Team	Pld	W	L	D	PF	PA	Pts
1	Woodville	15	13	2	0	1681	747	26
2	Colonel Light Gardens	15	10	5	0	1041	972	20
3	Collegians	15	9	6	0	1108	1049	18
4	Goodwood	15	7	8	0	1015	1043	14
5	Kenilworth	15	6	9	0	1125	1165	12
6	Teachers College	15	0	15	0	487	1481	0

=== Finals ===
==== Semi Finals ====
	Semi-finals
Saturday, 23 August (2:45 pm)	Woodville 14.10	def.	Collegians 6.10	Goodwood Oval
Saturday, 23 August (2:45 pm)	Colonel Light Gardens 6.9	def. by	Goodwood 12.11	Teachers' College Oval

==== Final ====
Saturday, 6 September	Woodville	def.	Goodwood	Mortlock Park Oval
12.7 (79)	Q1; Q2; Q3; Final	10.14 (74)	Umpires: M.F. Armstrong boundary: L.R. Cooper and H.R. Holder
K. Edwards 3, Hickman 3, Evans 2, Wiles 2, Hendry, Trebilcock	Goals	Whittard 4, Gordon 2, Willats, Jenkins, Tomlinson, Simcock
Hickman, Weekley, Edwards, Evans, Trebilcock, Hamilton	Best	Spouse, Willats, Burns, Dunn, Temby, Pearce
