= 1931 SAAFL season =

1931 premiership season
- Date: 2 May - 5 September
- Premiers: A1: Semaphore Central; A2: Alberton Church United; Junior League: Kenilworth B
- Minor premiers: A1: Semaphore Central; A2: Alberton Church United; Junior League: Kenilworth B
- Wooden spooners: A1: Henley and Grange; A2: University B Junior League: S. Peter's O.C. B
- Best and fairest: A1: Rex Walter (Teachers' College); A2: Paul Robertson (Scotch O.C.)
- Leading goalkicker: A1: Chris Munro (Kenilworth) 83 goals A2: Clarrie Gaston (Alberton Church United) 49 goals

The 1931 SAAFL season was the 17th season of the South Australian Amateur Football League (SAAFL).

The season commenced on 2 May and concluded on 5 September.

A Junior division was formed for B teams of clubs already in the Amateur League, this division would be separately managed, but affiliated with the league.

Kingswood and Mount Barker, who were the bottom two positions of the 1930 season, were relegated into A2. Their places being taken by the premiers and runner-up of A2 in 1930, St. Peter's O.C. and Henley & Grange respectively. Railways Institute, which was last in A2 in 1930, entered the newly formed Junior League.

The entrance of Goodwood (playing at Goodwood Oval), winner of Mid-Southern Football Association in 1930, returned to the Amateur League; and Alberton Church United (playing at Queenstown Oval), Port Adelaide District Football Association.

The S.A.A.F.L. had introduced a new clause in the Amateur League's constitution to prevent S.A.N.F.L. clubs from taking players from the Amateur League once the season has commenced. The rule introduced that a registered amateur player, who transferred to the senior body, could not return to the amateurs in the same season. This was explained by the Amateur League secretary, Mr. H. V. Millard, in The Advertiser and Register, "The Amateur League was not formed for the purpose of supplying or training players for A or B grade football. The principal object of our league is the encouragement and advancement of amateur football."

== A1 ==
University A, Semaphore Central, Kenilworth, Underdale, St. Augustine, Teachers' College, St. Peter's O.C., Henley & Grange.

=== Ladder ===
Pos	Team	Pld	W	L	D	PF	PA	Pts
1	Semaphore Central	14	11	3	0	1223	849	22
2	University	14	11	3	0	1499	1115	22
3	Kenilworth	14	10	4	0	1407	923	20
4	Underdale United	14	9	5	0	1228	916	18
5	Teachers Training College	14	6	8	0	1259	1330	12
6	St. Peters Old Collegians	14	4	10	0	883	1284	8
7	St. Augustine	14	3	11	0	894	1510	6
8	Henley and Grange	14	2	12	0	996	1362	4

=== Semi Finals ===
	Semi-finals
Saturday, 22 August	Semaphore Central 15.8	def.	Kenilworth 9.18	University Oval
Saturday, 22 August	University 6.4	def. by	Underdale 12.20	Glenelg Oval

=== Final ===
Final
Saturday, 29 August	Semaphore Central	def.	Underdale	University Oval (crowd: 1500)
12.11	Q1; Q2; Q3; Final	9.18	Umpires: F.H. Golding
Prideaux 8, Doyle 2, Reval, Carslaw	Goals
Robertson, Brame, Jordon	Best

== A2 ==
Prince Alfred Old Collegians, Scotch Old Collegians, University B, Y.M.C.A., Alberton Church United, Goodwood, Mount Barker, Kingswood.

=== Ladder ===
Pos	Team	Pld	W	L	D	Pts
1	Alberton Church United	14	12	2	0	24
2	Goodwood	14	12	2	0	24
3	Kingswood	14	8	4	2	18
4	Prince Alfred Old Collegians	14	7	5	2	16
5	Scotch Old Collegians	14	6	8	0	12
6	Mount Barker	14	4	10	0	8
7	Y.M.C.A	14	3	11	0	6
8	University B	14	2	12	0	4

=== Semi Finals ===
	Semi-finals
Saturday, 15 August	Alberton Church United 16.14	def.	Kingswood 8.6	Prospect Oval
Saturday, 15 August	Goodwood 7.8	def.	Prince Alfred O.C. 5.9	Thebarton Ground

source: Final

	Final
Saturday, 22 August	Alberton Church United 8.12	def. by	Goodwood 9.8	Jubilee Oval

=== Challenge Final ===
Challenge Final
Saturday, 29 August	Alberton Church United	def.	Goodwood	Jubilee Oval
13.10	Q1; Q2; Q3; Final	7.14	Umpires: W. Minear
Parsons 6, Curtis 3, Lynch, W. Beasley, McGorm, Cornow	Goals	Parker 2, Allen, Cox, Maley, Williams
Curtis, Forrestall, Parsons	Best	Holder, Doig, Marshall

== Junior League ==
Kenilworth B, St. Peter's O.C. B, Goodwood B, Colonel Light Gardens B, Railways Institute

=== Ladder ===
Pos	Team	Pld	W	L	D	PF	PA	Pts
1	Kenilworth B	12	11	1	0	1187	520	22
2	Colonel Light Gardens B	12	9	3	0	903	494	18
3	S.A. Railways Institute	12	6	6	0	710	787	12
4	Goodwood B	12	3	9	0	625	875	6
5	Saint Peters Old Collegians B	12	1	11	0	464	1246	2

=== Semi Finals ===
	Semi-finals
Saturday, 22 August	Kenilworth B 8.14	def.	S.A. Railways Institute 5.4	Goodwood Reserve
Saturday, 22 August	Colonel Light Gardens B 18.10	def.	Goodwood B 13.10

=== Final ===
Final
Saturday, 29 August	Kenilworth B	def.	Colonel Light Gardens B	Norwood Oval
8.16	Q1; Q2; Q3; Final	8.6
Biggs 3, Peter 3, Dawson, Whitford	Goals	Fillmore 2, Jones 2, W. Harris 2, Nieman, M. Binns
Bailey, Peter, Smith	Best	Nieman, Stewart, J. Harris

== Inter-League ==
A match was played between Alberton Church United (A2 Premiers) and a combined Junior League team at Railways Oval on Saturday 5th September.

Junior Team:

O'Malley (captain), Spear, Biggs, Wyly, Masters, Fillmore, Quigley, Healy, Read, Harris, Cotton, Hunter, Balley, Dempster, Westphalen, Melhurish, Nieman, Wilson, A. Chapman (19), H.M. Stewart (20), C.W. Llyod (21).

Inter-League
Saturday, 5 September	Alberton Church United	v	Combined Junior League	Railways Oval
Q1; Q2; Q3; Final

== Representative ==
=== vs Metropolitan Amateur Football Association ===
SAAFL
B:	Ash	Stephenson	Robertson
HB:	Scott	Walter	Waldeck (v.c.)
C:	Evans	Brunt	Woods
HF:	Porter	McMichael	Flood
F:	Kinnear	Hann	Seppelt
Foll:	Sangster (capt.)	Toms	Abbott
Res:	Richards	Bridgland	

MAFA
B:	D. Ward (Old Melbournians)	McIntyre (Teachers' College)	Arthur (Old Paradians)
HB:	T. Taylor (Brightonvale)	Sloan (Old Scotch)	B. Taylor (University Blues)
C:	Campbell (Old Melbournians)	Oakley (Collegians)	Honey (Kingsville)
HF:	Gilmour (Elsternwick)	McGregor (University Blues)	Barwick (East Malvern)
F:	Dudgeon (Elsternwick)	Chandler (Savings Bank)	La Fontaine (University Blacks)
Foll:	Scott (capt.) (Murrumbeena)	Rankine (Collegians)	Vize (Geelong Amateurs)
Res:	Sprauge (East Malvern)	Cocks (Savings Bank)	

King;s Birthday - Representative Match
Monday, 8 June	M.A.F.A	def.	S.A.A.F.L	Melbourne Cricket Ground
2.3; 6.6; 9.16; 15.16 (106)	Q1; Q2; Q3; Final	1.4; 1.10; 2.11; 6.16 (52)
Chandler 6, La Fontaine 4, Gilmour 2, Barwick 2, Dudgeon	Goals	Abbott 2, Flood 2, Toms, Seppelt
