= 1951 SAAFL season =

1951 premiership season
- Date: 21 April - 22 September
- Premiers: A1: University; A2: Prince Alfred O.C. A3: Semaphore Park
- Minor premiers: A1: University; A2: Payneham; A3: Semaphore Park
- Wooden spooners: A1: Kelvinator; A2: Postal Institute; A3: Prince Alfred O.C. B
- Best and fairest: A1 (Hone Medal): Robert Baird (Kelvinator); A2 (Chambers Medal): Robert Allen (Goodwood); A3 (McKay Medal): Fred LeCouteur (Flinders Park); War Memorial Medal: Alistair McLeod (University)
- Leading goalkicker: A1: Richard Hancock (University) 69 goals

The 1951 SAAFL season was the 33rd season of the South Australian Amateur Football League (SAAFL).

The season commenced on 21 April and concluded on 22 September.

The premier team of Grade AI received a jubilee trophy and the winner of the Hone Medal, AI Best and Fairest, also received an additional trophy.

Pulteney Old Scholars returned after a year's absence, along with new teams Semaphore Park (Premiers of the Port Adelaide District Association in the previous 2 years) and Woodville B. This made a 32 team competition, A1 and A2 still 10 teams each, A3 with 12 teams.

== A1 ==
=== Ladder ===
Pos	Team	Pld	W	L	D	PF	PA	Pts
1	University	18	15	3	0			30
2	Exeter	18	13	4	1			27
3	Walkerville	18	13	5	0			26
4	Semaphore Central	18	10	8	0			20
5	Flinders Park	18	10	8	0			20
6	Alberton Church United	18	10	8	0			20
7	Woodville	18	9	9	0			18
8	Riverside	18	6	11	1			13
9	Colonel Light Gardens	18	2	16	0			4
10	Kelvinator	18	1	17	0			2

=== Finals ===
==== Semi Finals ====
	Semi-finals
Saturday, 1 September	University 15.5 (95)	drew with	Walkerville 13.17 (95)	Payneham Oval
Saturday, 1 September	Exeter 9.11 (65)	def.	Semaphore Central 5.5 (35)	Woodville Oval
Saturday, 8 September	University 5.13 (43)	def. by	Walkerville 6.13 (49)	Alberton Oval

==== Final ====
Saturday, 15 September	Exeter	def.	Walkerville	Alberton Oval
0.3 (3); 3.5 (23); 8.8 (56); 9.8 (62)	Q1; Q2; Q3; Final	0.1 (1); 4.4 (28); 4.7 (31); 6.10 (46)
Christensen 3, Murray 3, Hobbs, Wellington, Luckman	Goals	F, Gubbins 3, Johns 2, Young

==== Challenge Final ====
Saturday, 22 September	University	def.	Exeter	Thebarton Oval
2.0 (12); 5.2 (32); 6.3 (39); 6.8 (44)	Q1; Q2; Q3; Final	2.3 (9); 3.3 (15); 4.12 (36); 5.13 (43)
R. Hancock 2, A. McLeod 2, J. Martin, D. Giles	Goals	K. Wellington 2, J. Harvey, R. Harvey, R. Murray

== A2 ==
=== Ladder ===
Pos	Team	Pld	W	L	D	PF	PA	Pts
1	Payneham	18	16	2	0			32
2	Goodwood	18	15	3	0			30
3	Kenilworth	18	13	5	0			26
4	Prince Alfred O.C.	18	12	6	0			24
5	Rosewater	18	11	6	1			23
6	University B	18	7	11	0			14
7	St. Peter's O.C.	18	5	12	1			11
8	King's O.C.	18	5	13	0			10
9	Teachers' College	18	5	13	0			10
10	Postal Institute	18	0	18	0			0

Postal Institute forfeited from round 8

=== Finals ===
==== Semi Finals ====
	Semi-finals
Saturday, 1 September	Payneham 8.13 (31)	def. by	Kenilworth 13.13 (91)	Goodwood Oval
Saturday, 1 September	Goodwood 10.10 (70)	def. by	Prince Alfred O.C. 13.13 (91)	University Oval

==== Final ====
Saturday, 8 September	Kenilworth	def. by	Prince Alfred O.C.	Payneham Oval
8.9 (57)	Q1; Q2; Q3; Final	11.19 (85)

==== Challenge Final ====
Saturday, 15 September	Payneham	def. by	Prince Alfred O.C.	Norwood Oval
5.15 (45)	Q1; Q2; Q3; Final	10.13 (73)

== A3 ==
=== Ladder ===
Pos	Team	Pld	W	L	D	PF	PA	Pts
1	Semaphore Park	20	20	0	0			40
2	Woodville B	20	19	1	0			38
3	Payneham B	20	14	6	0			28
4	Pulteney O.S.	20	14	6	0			28
5	Flinders Park B	20	14	6	0			28
6	University C	20	10	10	0			20
7	Scotch O.C.	20	7	13	0			14
8	Goodwood B	20	7	13	0			14
9	St. Peters O.C. B	20	6	14	0			12
10	Railways' Institute	20	4	16	0			8
11	Teachers' College B	20	4	16	0			8
12	Prince Alfred O.C. B	20	1	19	0			2

=== Finals ===
==== Semi Finals ====
	Semi-finals
Saturday, 8 September	Semaphore Park 13.11 (89)	def.	Payneham 6.12 (48)	Goodwood Oval
Saturday, 8 September	Woodville B 13.12 (90)	def.	Pulteney O.S. 7.8 (50)	Teachers' College Oval

==== Final ====
Darnley Naylor Shield
Saturday, 15 September	Semaphore Park	def.	Woodville B	Glenelg Oval
11.8 (74)	Q1; Q2; Q3; Final	6.12 (48)

== Representative ==
=== Australian Amateur Football Council Carnival ===
The fourth A.A.F.C. carnival was held at the St. Kilda Cricket Ground on July 7th to 12th.

SA Amateur Team: G.P. Wilson (manager), E.G. Tilley (Coach), R. Samuels (Trainer). R.L. Wood capt. (King's O.C.), J. Quinn vice-capt. (Riverside), C.M. Irvine (Riverside), R.M. Hewitt (Goodwood), H.F. Ryan (Flinders Park), B. Bunce (Alberton Church United), V. White (Alberton Church United), T.E. Garland (Woodville), D. Polden (Woodville), R.J. Lawrence (University), W.R. Quintrell (University), R.R. Hancock (University), M.G. Inglis (Semaphore Central), M.C. Burton (Semaphore Central), C.H. Dinning (Semaphore Central), R.T. Forster (Walkerville), C.A. Jarrett (Walkerville), K.N. Wilkingson (Walkerville), D.E. Cock (Walkerville), Ron Harvey (Exeter), Jim Harvey (Exeter), M.F. Watt (Exeter), C. Christensen (Exeter), R.A. Murray (Exeter), A. Dolman (Exeter).
