= Campbelltown-Magill Football Club =

Campbelltown-Magill

Names
- Full name: Campbelltown-Magill Football Club

Club details
- Founded: 1976
- Dissolved: 1998; 27 years ago
- Competition: South Australian Amateur
- Premierships: 1 Central District: 1981

Campbelltown-Magill Football Club was an Australian rules football club based in the eastern suburbs of Adelaide that was formed as Campbelltown-Magill United in 1976 as a merger between the "Campbelltown Football Club" and the "Magill Royal Football Club".

== History ==
Campbelltown-Magill United Football Club was formed in 1976 from a merger of Campbelltown and Magill Royal. The Campbelltown FC had been formed in 1913 as the 'Glenroy Football Club'. The club joined the North Eastern Hills Football Association in 1915 before moving to the East Torrens Football Association in 1919. In 1966 Glenroy changed its name to "Campbelltown" and in 1969 joined the Norwood-North Football Association. In 1976, Campbelltown merged with Magill Royal to form Campbelltown-Magill United. On the other hand, The "Magill Royal FC" had been formed in 1913. It joined the East Torrens Football Association in 1920. In 1969, Magill Royal joined the Norwood-North Football Association.

Campbelltown-Magill United initially participated in the Norwood-North Football Association before moving to the South Australian Football Association in 1978. The club was renamed to Campbelltown-Magill in 1979 and shifted to the Central District Football Association in 1980. In 1985 the club moved to the South Australian Amateur Football League where it remained until it went into recess in 1998 due to lack of players, and has not reformed to date.

== A-Grade Premierships ==
- Central District FA A1 (1): 1981

=== Club's predecessors premierships ===
Campbelltown

- East Torrens FA (6): 1933, 1950, 1951, 1953, 1954, 1958

Magill Royal

- East Torrens FA (2): 1934, 1948
