= Modbury Football Club =

Modbury

Names
- Full name: Modbury Football Club
- Nickname: Hawks

Club details
- Founded: 1862; 164 years ago
- Colours
- Competition: Adelaide Footy League
- Coach: Daniel Miller
- Captain: Darcy Pisani
- Ground: Modbury Oval (capacity: 2,000)

Uniforms
Home

Other information
- Official website: modburyhawks.org.au

The Modbury Football Club (nicknamed the Hawks) is an Australian rules football club based in Modbury, a suburb of Adelaide in South Australia.

Formed in 1862, the Modbury Football Club is the oldest extant football club in South Australia and the sixth oldest football club of any code in Australia.

The Modbury Hawks currently field 30 teams. Senior teams compete in the South Australian Amateur Football League and junior teams in the North Eastern Metropolitan Junior Football League. It also now fields a women's team and an under-18 girls' team in the SAWFL. The club has over 550 registered players.

== Early history ==
1862: First interclub game of football in South Australia	Goals
Adelaide	2
Modbury	0
Venue: Old Modbury Oval

The first game recorded as taking place was between Modbury and the Adelaide Football Club in 1862. Each side had 20 players but there were no umpires. The game ended after Adelaide kicked its second goal and the game was declared in their favour, 2 goals to nil.

The two teams met again the following year, on a strip of land near the Modbury Hotel (Civic Park), when "the game was kept up with the greatest spirit and good feeling, and so equally were the sides matched that not a goal was obtained"

== Post World War II (1947-1968) ==
Modbury had been affiliated with the North Adelaide District Football Association from 1947 to 1950 and 1954–58. In 1963 it reformed after a number of inactive seasons and competed in the A2 Grade winning the Premiership by defeating Broadview by 3 goals in the Grand Final. It won back to back A1 premierships in 1967 and 1968. In 1969 the club moved to the Norwood-North Football Association when the NADFA merged with the East Torrens Football Association.

== Celebrations ==
To celebrate the 100th anniversary, in 1962, and during the state's 150th-year celebrations, in 1986, a special game was played between the Modbury Football Club and the South Adelaide Football Club at Modbury Oval to commemorate two of the oldest clubs in the state.

The club celebrated its 150th year in 2012.

== Club honours ==
Modbury Premierships (37 senior, 45 junior, 1 women)

A grade: (18) 1934, 1935, 1963, 1967, 1968, 1974, 1976, 1978, 1985, 1989, 1992, 1994, 2001, 2004, 2005, 2008, 2014, 2016

B grade: (4) 1972, 1992, 2001, 2004

C grade: (9) 1988, 1989, 1994, 1997, 1998, 2005, 2009, 2013, 2017, 2023, 2023

D grade: (3) 1994, 2015, 2017

Women: (1) 2022

Under 18: (1) 2019

Under 16: (2) 1979, 2012, 2019

Under 15: (6) 1970, 1994, 1995, 2010, 2013, 2015

Under 14: (4) 1992, 1993, 1994, 1999

Under 13: (12) 1970, 1971, 1991, 1992, 1993, 1994, 1997, 1998, 1999, 2012, 2015, 2017, 2022

Under 12: (7) 1982, 1987, 1990, 1993, 1999, 2005, 2010

Under 11: (10) 1969, 1989, 1991, 1993, 1993 (composite), 1995, 1998, 2010, 2011, 2012

Under 10: (2) 1982, 1985

== Guernseys ==
- Up to 1937 – Maroon guernsey with one white band, later replaced with a white vee
- 1947–1978 – Dark blue guernsey with a light blue vee
- 1979–onwards – Brown and gold vertical stripes

== Grounds ==
up to 1963 – Old Modbury Oval (Civic Park, adjacent to the Modbury Hotel). 1964 – Memorial Oval, Tea Tree Gully. 1965 – Temporary Oval, now Waterworld Swimming Centre. 1966 – onwards – Modbury Oval

Illyarrie Oval was also used for junior training and games.

== Leagues ==
Prior to 1906 – Records not kept
1906 – Hills Football Association
1931 – North Eastern Hills Football Association
1936 – East Torrens Football Association
1947 – North Adelaide District Football Association
1969 – Norwood-North Football Association
1978 – South Australian Football Association
1988 – South Australian Amateur Football League

== Club song ==
We're a happy team at Modbury, We're the Mighty Fighting Hawks.

We love our club and we play to win, Riding the bumps with a grin, at Modbury.

Come what may, you'll find us striving, Teamwork is the thing that talks.

One for all and all for one, Is the way we play at Modbury.

We are the Mighty Fighting Hawks.
