= East Torrens Football Association =

The East Torrens Football Association (ETFA) was an Australian rules football competition based in the eastern and north-eastern suburbs of Adelaide, South Australia until it merged with the North Adelaide District Football Association to form the Norwood-North Football Association at the end of the 1968 season. It was formed and held its first annual meeting was held on 7 April 1915 at Norwood for the purpose of “fostering junior football in the Norwood district."

== Early history ==
With the introduction of Electoral Zones for the South Australian Football Association (SAFA) Senior Clubs a well attended meeting of the junior footballers in the East Torrens Electorate arranged by the Norwood Football Club was held at the Norwood Hotel on 7 April 1898. It was decided at the meeting that the Association should consist of six clubs, and that all players must be residents of the East Torrens Electorate. To assist the Association, the Norwood Football Club offered a trophy of to be given to the club gaining the premiership of the Association. In addition, the senior team will also give two footballs to each individual club in the Association, and also will give them balls to practise with. The clubs present forming the Association were the Tusmore, College Park, Eden Park, and Albions whilst it is expected that a team from Payneham will also join. However, two other clubs joined - Rose Park and Marryatville which both played off of for second place with later being victorious.

On 9 July 1898 the East Torrens Association visited Gawler and were comprehensively defeated by the Gawler Association - 2 behinds to 14 goals 21 behinds.

The Electoral District of East Torrens existed from 1857 to 1902 and again from 1915 to 1938.

== Formation of second incarnation of association in 1915 ==
For the 1915 Season the Association comprised the following clubs — Norwood Union, Payneham, Magill, Marryatville, and Kent Town. The Magill club withdrew on 4 August 1915 on account of the majority of the members having enlisted for active service. The competition went into recession for 3 seasons (1916 to 1918) due to World War 1.

In 1939, the competition had expanded to 13 clubs when Athelstone were admitted.

In 1947, the competition consisted of 10 clubs - Magill Royals, Norwood Union, Ashton, Athelstone, Kensington and Norwood Youth Club, Kensington Gardens, Tea Tree Gully, Glenroy, Burnside and Salisbury which had joined in 1946

== Clubs ==
=== Final ===
Club	Colours	Nickname	Home Ground	Former League	Est.	Years in ETFA	ETFA Senior Premierships		Fate
Club	Colours	Nickname	Home Ground	Former League	Est.	Years in ETFA	Total	Years	Fate
Ashton		Saints	Ashton Oval, Ashton	MLFA, HFA	1907	1938-1948, 1962-1968	2	1938, 1940	Played in Hills FA from 1949-61. Formed Norwood-North FA in 1969
Athelstone		Raggies	Foxfield Oval, Athelstone	NADFA	1904	1916-1924, 1936-1968	5	1959, 1960, 1963, 1965, 1966	Moved to North Adelaide District FA in 1925. Formed Norwood-North FA in 1969
Brompton			Mary Lee Park (Park 27B), Adelaide Park Lands	AMFL	1945	1967-1968	0	-	Formed Norwood-North FA in 1969
Burnside			Bill Cooper Oval, Newland Park, Erindale	AMFL	1947	1947-1960, 1968	0	-	Played in Adelaide Metropolitan FL between 1961-67. Formed Norwood-North FA in 1969
Campbelltown (Glenroy 1919-65)			Campbelltown Memorial Oval, Paradise	NEHFA	1913	1919-1968	6	1933, 1950, 1951, 1953, 1954, 1958	Formed Norwood-North FA in 1969
Eastwood (Eastwood Rechabite 1938-41)			Carriageway Park (Park 17), Adelaide	SAAFL, AMFL	1930s	1938-1941, 1954–1955, 1968	1	1955	Formed Norwood-North FA in 1969
Hectorville		Hounds	Daly Oval, Hectorville	–	1961	1961-1968	1	1967	Formed Norwood-North FA in 1969
Kensington Gardens			Parkinson Oval, Kensington Gardens	–	1947	1947-1968	3	1949, 1962, 1964	Formed Norwood-North FA in 1969
Kersbrook		Blues, Brookers	Kersbrook Soldiers Memorial Park, Kersbrook	TVFA	1912	1966-1968	0	-	Formed Norwood-North FA in 1969
Magill Royal		Royals	Murray Park Oval, Magill	–	1913	1915, 1920-1968	2	1934, 1948	Formed Norwood-North FA in 1969
Norwood Union	(1946)(1947-53)(1958-60)(other years)		Marryatville High School, Marryatville	SADFA, YMCAFA	1902	1915, 1920, 1922-1968	9	1915, 1920, 1923, 1925, 1926, 1932, 1939, 1941, 1946, 1947, 1952, 1967	Played in YMCAFA in 1921. Formed Norwood-North FA in 1969
Para-Houghton			Houghton Memorial Oval, Houghton & Paracombe Recreation Reserve, Paracombe	TVFA	1915	1960-1968	0	-	Formed Norwood-North FA in 1969
Tea Tree Gully		Gullies, Wolves	Pertaringa Oval, Banksia Park	NEHFA, NADFA	1862	1946-1954, 1957-1968	0	-	Formed Norwood-North FA in 1969
West Torrens reserves		Eagles	Thebarton Oval, Thebarton		1893	?-1968	1	1968	Moved to SANFL reserves in 1969

=== Former ===
Club	Colours	Nickname	Home Ground	Former League	Est.	Years in ETFA	ETFA Senior Premierships		Fate
Club	Colours	Nickname	Home Ground	Former League	Est.	Years in ETFA	Total	Years	Fate
Commonwealth Bank		Bankers		–	1950	1951	0	-	Moved to SAAFL in 1952
Dulwich			Victoria Park Race Course, Adelaide	–	1919	1920-1921	0	-	Moved to SAAFL in 1922
East Torrens Imperial (East Torrens 1928-29)				–	1928	1928-1935	0	-	Folded after 1935 season
Forest Range			Forest Range Oval, Forest Range	MLFA, HFA	1902	1929-1933, 1960-1966	0	-	Returned to Mounty Lofty FA in 1934. Merged with Lenswood to form Lenswood Rangers in Hills FL in 1967
Hope Valley United (Hope Valley & Highbury United 1937)			Highbury Oval, Hope Valley	NEHFA	1906	1937-1948	0	-	Moved to North Adelaide District FA in 1949
Hyde Park			Webb Oval, Glenunga	–	1954	1954-1959	0	-	Moved to SAAFL in 1960
Kensington			Victoria Park Race Course, Adelaide	–	1925	1925-1932	5	1927, 1928, 1929, 1930, 1931	Moved to SAAFL in 1933
Kensington & Norwood Youth Club						1947	0	-	?
Kent Town						1915, 1920	0	-	?
Magill Juniors						1935-1938	0	-	?
Marryatville			Victoria Park Race Course, Adelaide	–	1915	1915, 1919, 1923-1925	0	-	Moved to SAAFL in 1933
Maylands						1928-1938	0	-	Folded after 1938 season
Modbury			Modbury Oval, Ridgehaven	NEHFA	1862	1936-1937	0	-	Entered recess in 1938. Re-formed in North Adelaide District FA in 1947
Newstead						1924-1925	1	1924	?
Norwood Central						1919	0	-	?
Norwood Juniors						1938	0	-	?
Payneham	(1915-24)(1926-38)		Payneham Oval, Payneham	–	1901	1915, 1919–1924, 1926-1938	6	1919, 1921, 1935, 1936, 1937, 1945	Recess in 1925. Moved to SAAFL in 1939
Payneham B			Payneham Oval, Payneham		1901	1946	0	-	Moved to SAAFL in 1947
Salisbury		Magpies	Salisbury Oval, Salisbury	LNFA	1883	1946-1947	0	-	Returned to Lower North FA in 1948
South Australian Fruitgrowers						1920	0	-	?
St Ignatius						1929	0	-	?
Walkerville Juniors			Walkerville Oval, Walkerville		1901	1935	0	-	?
Wayville						1919	0	-	?
YMCA						1950-1958	1	1956	Folded after 1958 season

== Premierships ==
=== A-Grade ===
- 1915 - Norwood Union
- 1916 - in recess
- 1917 - in recess
- 1918 - in recess
- 1919 - Payneham
- 1920 - Norwood Union
- 1921 - Payneham
- 1922
- 1923 - Norwood Union
- 1924 - Newstead
- 1925 - Norwood Union
- 1926 - Norwood Union
- 1927 - Kensington
- 1928 - Kensington undefeated
- 1929 - Kensington
- 1930 - Kensington
- 1931 - Kensington
- 1932 - Norwood Union
- 1933 - Glenroy
- 1934 - Magill Royal
- 1935 - Payneham
- 1936 - Payneham
- 1937 - Payneham
- 1938 - Ashton
- 1939 - Norwood Union
- 1940 - Ashton undefeated
- 1941 - Norwood Union
- 1942-1944 - in recess
- 1945 - Payneham
- 1946 - Norwood Union
- 1947 - Norwood Union
- 1948 - Magill Royal
- 1949 - Kensington Gardens
- 1950 - Glenroy
- 1951 - Glenroy
- 1952 - Norwood Union
- 1953 - Glenroy
- 1954 - Glenroy
- 1955 - Eastwood
- 1956 - YMCA
- 1957
- 1958 - Glenroy
- 1959 - Athelstone
- 1960 - Athelstone
- 1961 - Norwood Union
- 1962 - Kensington Gardens
- 1963 - Athelstone
- 1964 - Kensington Gardens
- 1965 - Athelstone
- 1966 - Athelstone
- 1967 - Hectorville
- 1968 - West Torrens Reserves
