= Tea Tree Gully Football Club =

Australian rules football club in South Australia

Names
- Full name: Tea Tree Gully District Football Club
- Nickname(s): Gullies, Wolves

2021 season
- Home-and-away season: 5th

Club details
- Founded: 1862; 163 years ago (Note: The club played its first match on that date, after splitting apart from Modbury F.C.)
- Colours
- Competition: Adelaide Footy League
- President: Shaun Power
- Coach: Justin Maschotta
- Ground(s): Steventon Drive, Banksia Park

Uniforms
Home	Away

Other information
- Official website: gullies.com.au

The Tea Tree Gully District Football Club is an Australian rules football club located in Banksia Park, South Australia. Tea Tree Gully currently plays in the Adelaide Footy League, formerly known as the "South Australian Amateur Football League" (SAAFL).

== History ==
The club was originally part of "Modbury F.C." in 1862, but it soon split apart from them to form their own institution. Tea Tree played its first game against the "Adelaidians" in a paddock near Modbury on 30 August 1862. It ended when the "Adelaidians" scored their second goal and won the game.

The club's original home was at Memorial Oval, operating out of a tin shed. These relatively primitive facilities prevailed until its current home at Pertaringa Oval was opened in 1964. Originally the club played in the double blue colours associated with Sturt, before switching to the black and red that has been the club's colours to this day.

Tea Tree Gully played in the Torrens Valley Football Association, the North Eastern Hills Football Association, the East Torrens Football Association, the Norwood North Adelaide Football Association and the South Australian Football Association before becoming a part of the South Australian Amateur Football League.

Former Australian Football League players include Daniel Gorringe and Ryan Schoenmakers. Former Carlton and Adelaide player Troy Menzel joined the club in 2018 along with fellow Crow Luke Brown in 2023.

== Records ==
The club holds the record for the most players and teams in South Australia with 829 players and 23 teams in its junior division.
