= Salesian College (Brooklyn Park) =

Roman Catholic school in Adelaide, Australia

Salesian College was a Roman Catholic school in Brooklyn Park, a western suburb of Adelaide, South Australia. It operated as a boys-only school from 1954. Girls were also enrolled from 1978, until the school's closure in 1996. The boarding section of the school closed in 1984. It had been St John's Boys Town since 1941, an orphanage for boys aged over 12 years.

The main buildings were sold to the Adelaide College of Divinity which moved in to the site from 1997.
