= Adelaide Footy League =

Australian rules football league

- Current season, competition or edition: 2026 AdFL season
- Formerly: South Australian Amateur Football League (1911-2016)
- Founded: 8 March 1911; 115 years ago
- First season: 1911
- No. of teams: 69 (Men); 41 (Women)
- Country: Australia
- Current premiers: Division 1: Salisbury North; Division 2: Henley; Division 3: Seaton Ramblers; Division 4: Scotch OC; Division 5: Greenacres; Division 6: Gaza; Division 7: Adelaide Lutheran
- Broadcaster(s): Nine Network (2018)
- Official website: adelaidefooty.com.au

The Adelaide Footy League (AdFL), formerly known as the South Australian Amateur Football League (SAAFL), is a semi-professional Australian rules football competition based in Adelaide, South Australia. Comprising sixty-seven member clubs playing over one hundred and ten matches per week, the league is one of Australia's largest Australian rules football associations.

The league currently provides competition across eight Senior divisions with Reserves grades, accompanied by a separate C grade competition, all from Divisions 1 to 7.

== History ==
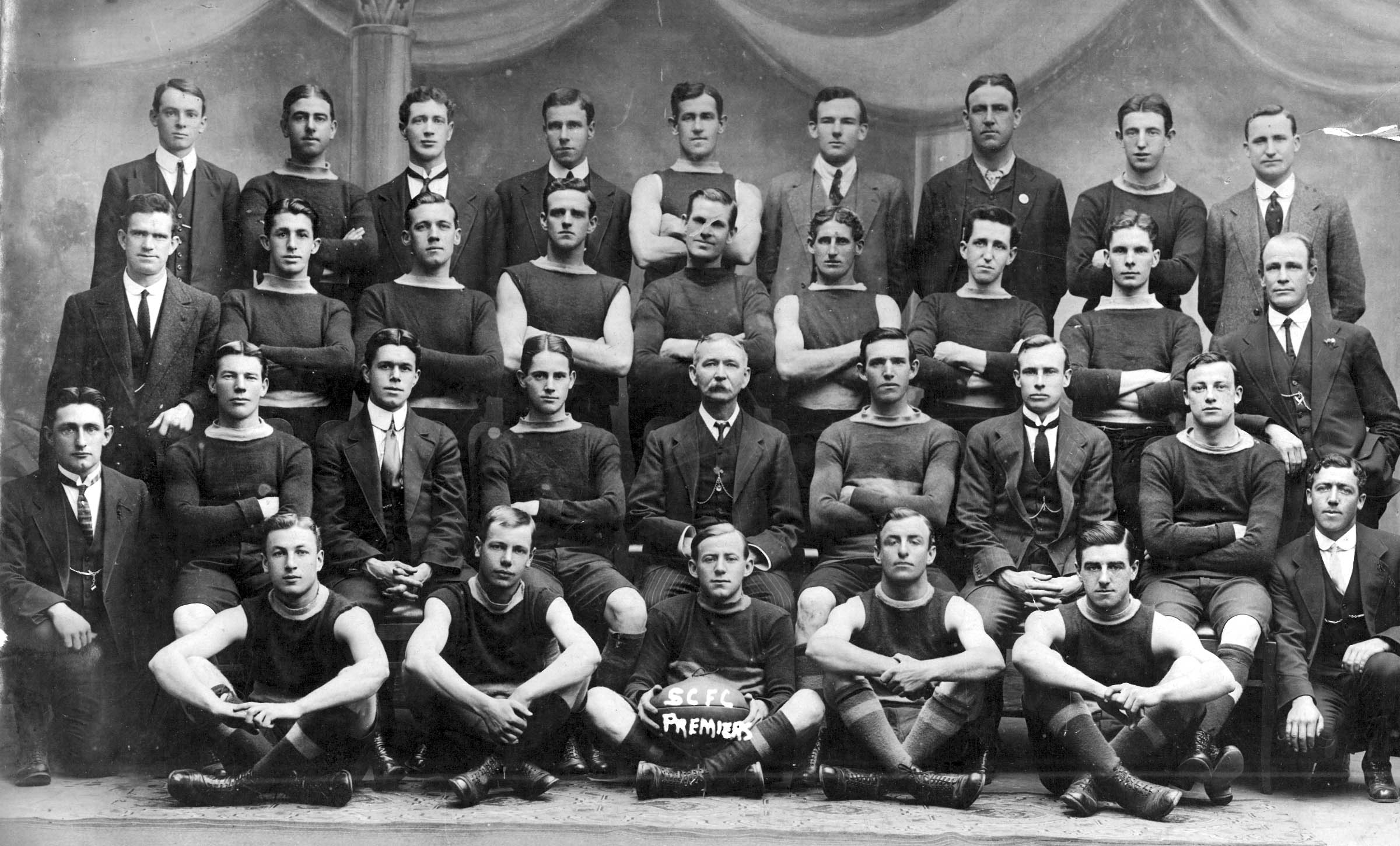
Semaphore Central FC (current Port District FC), 1914 Premiers

The league was officially formed on 8 March 1911 and the first match was played on 6 May 1911. With the exception of recesses during the two World Wars, the competition has been continuous since that time.

The South Australian Football Association (later to be renamed to South Australian National Football League) had existed as a competition since 1877, but in 1897 was restructured on an "electorate system" where players were zoned to clubs on the basis of their residential address for electoral enrolment. Adelaide University Football Club was keen to field a team in the SAFA competition and applied each year from 1906 to 1910. Each time the application was rejected as it was felt the inclusion of a university team would threaten the electorate system.

In 1910 the Adelaide University Sports Association thought the case for admission to SAFA would be strengthened if the University had a team playing successfully in regular competition. It was felt that this could be achieved by forming a purely amateur league with other clubs not already in an association. By late 1910 Glenferrie, Marlborough and St. Bartholomew clubs had agreed to join with University to form the new association based on amateur principles. By 1911, as preparations were in hand for the inaugural season, the four clubs had become five with the inclusion of St. Francis Xavier. The clubs also had agreed to admit late applicant Semaphore Central for the 1912 season.

In that first season only three ovals were used for matches – Jubilee Oval (Adelaide), Price Oval and University Oval. Price Oval (now known as Hawthorn Oval) in Mitcham and University Oval (at the corner of Sir Edwin Smith Avenue and War Memorial Drive) both still exist today. The Jubilee Oval however was built upon by University of Adelaide in 1946.

In 1915, the season prior to WW1, there were 8 clubs - St Francis Xavier (Captain T. Rice), Kenilworth (Captain P.S. Thomas, Kingswood (Captain H. Daw), Semaphore Central (Captain A. Channon), Prince Alfred College (Captain A.H. White), Glenferrie (Captain D. Craven), University (Captain C.E. Pellew), St Peter's College (Captain R.D. Hall).

Throughout the history of the league there have been many clubs join and leave the league. Affiliation peaked in 2001 with 72 clubs. Of the founding clubs, only Adelaide University remains.

The 2010 season marked the 100th year of the league, with the last day in September won by Henley, who won their first Division 1 premiership in history.

In 2017 the league decided to change its name from the South Australian Amateur Football League to the Adelaide Footy League.

== Clubs ==
=== Current Men's ===
==== Division 1 ====
Club	Colours	Nickname	Home Ground	Former League	Est.	Years in AdFL/SAAFL	AdFL/SAAFL Senior Premierships	
Club	Colours	Nickname	Home Ground	Former League	Est.	Years in AdFL/SAAFL	Total	Most recent
Athelstone		Raggies	Max Amber Sportfield, Paradise	SAFA	1904	1996-	2	2019
Glenunga		Rams	Webb Oval, Glenunga	ETFA	1954	1960-	11	2019
Golden Grove		Kookaburras	Harpers Field, Golden Grove	–	1995	1997-	6	2023
Henley		Sharks	Henley & Grange Memorial Oval, Henley Beach	–	1994	1994-	8	2026
Port District		Ditters	Largs Reserve, Largs Bay	SAFA	1979	1984-	11	2025
Prince Alfred OC		Reds, Princes	Bundey's Paddock (Park 9), North Adelaide	–	1926	1926-1940, 1946-	13	2023
Rostrevor OC		ROCS	Campbelltown Memorial Oval, Paradise	–	1923	1936-1939, 1947-1949, 1962-	14	2024
Salisbury North		Hawks	Salisbury North Oval, Salisbury North	SAFA	1953	1996-	1	2026
St. Peters OC		SPOCs, Saints	Caterer Oval, Hackney	–	1928	1928-1940, 1946-	14	2018
Tea Tree Gully		Gullies, Wolves	Pertaringa Oval, Banksia Park	SAFA	1862	1988-	9	2025

==== Division 2 ====
Club	Colours	Nickname	Home Ground	Former League	Est.	Years in AdFL/SAAFL	AdFL/SAAFL Senior Premierships	
Club	Colours	Nickname	Home Ground	Former League	Est.	Years in AdFL/SAAFL	Total	Most recent
Brighton		Bombers	Brighton Oval, Brighton	SFL	1991	1991-1996, 2017-	1	2017
Broadview		Tigers	Broadview Oval, Broadview	NADFA	1928	1964-	20	2022
Flinders Park		Reds	Flinders Park Oval, Flinders Park	SAFA	1927	1933, 1949-1977, 1996-	14	2023
Goodwood Saints		Saints	Goodwood Oval, Millswood	–	1985	1985-	15	2020
Modbury		Hawks	Modbury Oval, Ridgehaven	SAFA	1862	1988-	15	2016
Old Ignatians		Iggies	Karen Rolton Oval (Gladys Elphick Park, Park 25), Adelaide	–	1972	1972-	8	2021
Payneham Norwood Union		Falcons	Payneham Oval, Payneham	SAFA	1995	1996-	6	2019
PHOS Camden		Phantoms	Camden Oval, Novar Gardens	–	1994	1994-	8	2015
Sacred Heart OC		SHOCs, Double Blues, Hearts	Marcellin War Memorial Oval, Somerton Park	–	1968	1968-	4	2011
Seaton Ramblers		Rams	Pedlar Oval, Seaton	WTDFA	1958	1961-	9	2026

==== Division 3 ====
Club	Colours	Nickname	Home Ground	Former League	Est.	Years in AdFL/SAAFL	AdFL/SAAFL Senior Premierships	
Club	Colours	Nickname	Home Ground	Former League	Est.	Years in AdFL/SAAFL	Total	Most recent
Edwardstown		Towns	Edwardstown Oval, Edwardstown	SFL	1919	1996-2008, 2016-	3	2005
Kilburn		Chics	Blair Athol Reserve, Blair Athol	NADFA	1923	1958-	21	2024
Marion		Rams	Marion Oval, Marion	SFL	1891	2018-	2	2025
North Haven		Magpies	Largs North Oval, Largs North	ASFL	1935	1980-	2	2021
Pembroke OS		Kings	Haslam Oval, Kensington Park	–	1932	1936-1940, 1946-	11	2022
Plympton		Bulldogs	Plympton Oval, Plympton Park	SAFA	1937	1996-	4	2025
Scotch OC		None	Prince of Wales Oval, Torrens Park	–	1929	1929-1933, 1935-1939, 1946-1956, 1958-	11	2026
Unley Mercedes		Jets	Kingswood Oval, Kingswood	–	1970	1970-	5	2015
Walkerville		Cats	Walkerville Oval, Walkerville	SAFA	1901	1936-1979, 1990-	14	2020
Westminster OS		Dragons	Glandore Oval, Glandore	–	1969	1969-1981, 2000-	7	2025

==== Division 4 ====
Club	Colours	Nickname	Home Ground	Former League	Est.	Years in AdFL/SAAFL	AdFL/SAAFL Senior Premierships	
Club	Colours	Nickname	Home Ground	Former League	Est.	Years in AdFL/SAAFL	Total	Most recent
Adelaide University		Blacks	University Oval (Red Gum Park, Park 12), North Adelaide	–	1906	1911-	34	2010
CBC OC		Dolphins	CBC Main Oval (King Rodney Park, Park 15), Adelaide	–	1978	1978-	7	2023
Gepps Cross		Rams	Duncan Fraser Reserve, Northfield	SAFA	1952	1984-	8	2006
Greenacres		Dragons	LJ Lewis Reserve, Northfield	NNFA	1967	1973-2019, 2021-	9	2026
Hectorville		Hounds	Daly Oval, Hectorville	SAFA	1961	1990-	8	2022
Hope Valley		Demons	Hope Valley Sporting Club, Hope Valley	NMFL	1906	1987-	3	2019
Lockleys		Demons	Lockleys Oval, Lockleys	SMFL	1951	1986-	3	2020
Mitcham		Hawks	Price Memorial Oval, Hawthorn	SMFL	1908	1968-1975, 1985-	5	2024
Morphettville Park		Roos	Kellett Reserve Oval, Morphettville	SFL	1958	2017	1	2021
Pooraka		Bulls	Lindblom Park, Pooraka	SAFA	1920	1996-	4	2021

==== Division 5 ====
Club	Colours	Nickname	Home Ground	Former League	Est.	Years in AdFL/SAAFL	AdFL/SAAFL Senior Premierships	
Club	Colours	Nickname	Home Ground	Former League	Est.	Years in AdFL/SAAFL	Total	Most recent
Blackfriars OS		Hounds	St Dominics Oval (Pardipardinyilla, Park 2), North Adelaide	–	2005	2006-	3	2014
Colonel Light Gardens		Lions	Mortlock Park, Colonel Light Gardens	SMFL	1931	1931-1932, 1937-1941, 1946-1975, 1991-	8	2007
Eastern Park		Demons	Dwight Reserve South, Elizabeth Park	NMFL	1962	1995-	4	2024
Fitzroy		Lions	Sam Johnson Sportsground, Renown Park	–	1987	1987-	6	2025
Gaza		Eagles	Klemzig Oval, Klemzig	NADFA	1921	1962-	10	2026
Kenilworth		Kookaburras	St. Marys Park, St Marys	YMCAFA	1907	1914-1915, 1924-1985, 1991-1996, 1998-	8	2013
Pulteney		Navy Blues	Morgan Oval (Blue Gum Park, Park 20), Adelaide	–	1936	1936-1940, 1946-1949, 1951-1994, 1997-	11	2017
Salisbury		Magpies	Salisbury Oval, Salisbury	NMFL	1883	1995-	3	2007
SMOSH West Lakes		Lions	West Lakes Shore Oval, West Lakes Shore	–	1996	1996-	3	2007
Woodville South		Cats	Ledger Reserve, Woodville South	SMFL	1890	1979-	10	2016

==== Division 6 ====
Club	Colours	Nickname	Home Ground	Former League	Est.	Years in AdFL/SAAFL	AdFL/SAAFL Senior Premierships	
Club	Colours	Nickname	Home Ground	Former League	Est.	Years in AdFL/SAAFL	Total	Most recent
Adelaide Lutheran		Bulldogs	South Parklands (Mirnu Wirra, Park 21), Adelaide	SMFL	1969	1985-	8	2026
Central United		Bulldogs	Mofflin Reserve, Elizabeth Vale	NMFL	1962	1995-	2	2006
Elizabeth		Eagles	Argana Park, Elizabeth Downs	NMFL	1956	1995-	3	2025
Houghton Districts		Raiders	Houghton Memorial Oval, Houghton	–	1982	1983-	1	1999
Para Hills		Big Reds	The Paddocks, Para Hills West	NMFL	1974	1978-1989, 1995-2015, 2017-	5	2024
Portland		Thunder	Allen Iversen Reserve, Port Adelaide	–	1997	1997-	3	2013
Rosewater		Bulldogs	Eric Sutton Reserve, Rosewater	PADFA	1885	1949-	8	2003
St Paul's OS		SPOS, Saints	St. Paul's College, Gilles Plains	–	2015	2015-	1	2019
Trinity OS		Lions	Waldeck Oval, Evanston South	–	2006	2006-	2	2022

==== Division 7 ====
Club	Colours	Nickname	Home Ground	Former League	Est.	Years in AdFL/SAAFL	AdFL/SAAFL Senior Premierships	
Club	Colours	Nickname	Home Ground	Former League	Est.	Years in AdFL/SAAFL	Total	Most recent
Brahma Lodge		Tigers	Brahma Lodge Oval, Brahma Lodge	NMFL	1962	1996-	4	2021
Flinders University		Crabs, Double Blues	Flinders University Oval, Bedford Park	–	1966	1966-1980, 1982-2013, 2015-	5	2002
Hackham		Hawks	Hackham Sports Complex, Hackham	SFL	1976	2021-	0	–
Ingle Farm		Bulldogs	Rowe Park, Ingle Farm	SAFA	1968	1989-	5	2023
Mitchell Park		Lions	Mitchell Park Oval, Mitchell Park	SFL	1969	2001-	3	2015
O'Sullivan Beach/Lonsdale		Lions	Lonsdale Oval, Morphett Vale	SFL	2001	2018-	0	–
Smithfield		Panthers	Smithfield Oval, Smithfield	NMFL	1965	1995-2010, 2012-2020, 2023-	2	2015
West Croydon		Hawks	Fawk Reserve, Athol Park	NNFA	1961	1974-	6	2010

==== Men's clubs in recess ====
Club	Colours	Nickname	Home Ground	Former League	Est.	Years in AdFL/SAAFL	AdFL/SAAFL Senior Premierships	
Club	Colours	Nickname	Home Ground	Former League	Est.	Years in AdFL/SAAFL	Total	Most recent
Mawson Lakes (St Paul's OS 1980-2009)		Saints	Mawson Lakes Oval, Mawson Lakes	–	1978	1980-2025	2	2003

=== Women's Only ===
Club	Colours	Nickname	Home Ground	Est.	Men's Side	AdFL Women's Senior Premierships	
Club	Colours	Nickname	Home Ground	Est.	Men's Side	Total	Most recent
Angle Vale		Owls	Angle Vale Sport Complex, Angle Vale	1998	APFL	2	2024
Happy Valley		Vikings	Happy Valley Oval, Aberfoyle Park	1951	SFL	3	2024
Loreto OS		LOSA	Campbelltown Memorial Oval, Paradise	2022	-	1	2023
Wilderness OS		Lions, WOSA	Wilson Oval, Hackney	2025	–	1	2026

=== Locations ===
Colours indicate club's highest level of competition
Red = Division 1
Orange= Division 2
Yellow = Division 3
Green = Division 4
Light blue = Division 5
Blue = Division 6
Pink= Division 7
Purple = Women only

=== Former Clubs ===
Club	Colours	Nickname	Home Ground	Former League	Est.	Years in AdFL	AdFL Senior Premierships		Fate
Club	Colours	Nickname	Home Ground	Former League	Est.	Years in AdFL	Total	Most recent	Fate
Aboriginal Community College	(1976)(1977)		Park 23 or 24, Adelaide			1976–1977	0	-	Folded
Adelaide College (Teachers Training College 1923-34; Teachers College 1935-71; Adelaide Teachers College 1972-78)		Teachers, Penguins	Teacher's College Oval (Park 9), North Adelaide	–	1920	1923–1933, 1935–1985	11	1982	Recess in 1934. Folded in 1985
Adelaide High Old Scholars	(1933-35)(1962-64)(1993-2001)		Adelaide High School, Adelaide	–	1919	1933–1935, 1962–1964, 1993–2001	0	-	Recess between 1936-61 and 1965-92. Folded in 2001
Albert Sports		Druids	Challa Gardens Primary School, Kilkenny	SMFL	1930s	1982	0	-	Merged with Brompton to form Renown Park in 1983
Alberton United (Alberton Church United 1931-55)			Riverside Oval, Port Adelaide	–	1920s	1931–1940, 1946–1996	6	1994	Merged with Ethelton and Riverside to form Portland in 1997
Allenby Gardens (Allenby Gardens Methodist)			Ledger Reserve, Woodville South	UCFA	1950s	1968–1972	1	1970	Folded in 1972
Angle Vale		Owls	Angle Vale Sport Complex, Angle Vale	–	1998	2008–2015	0	-	Men's team moved to Adelaide Plains FL in 2016
ANZ Bank			Carriageway Park (Park 17), Adelaide	SMFL	1958	1981–1992	1	1981	Folded in 1993
Bank of Adelaide		Bankers	Mortlock Park, Colonel Light Gardens	–	1970	1970	0	-	Moved to Southern Metropolitan FL in 1971
Birkenhead Sports			ICI Oval, Peterhead	PADFA	1947	1953-1958	1	1953	Folded in 1958
Black Forest		Foresters	Weigall Oval, North Plympton	SMFL	1910s	1934	0	-	Moved to Adelaide Suburban FA in 1935
Blackwood		Woods	Blackwood Hill Reserve, Blackwood	HFL	1912	2014	0	-	Fielded thirds side for 2014 only
Brighton	(1958)(1959-65)(1966-68)	Tigers	Brighton Oval, Brighton	SMFL	1938	1958–1968	3	1960	Returned to Southern Metropolitan FL in 1969
Brighton High OS			Brighton Secondary College, North Brighton	–	1968	1968–1990	5	1987	Merged with Brighton to form Brighton Districts and Old Scholars in 1991
Brompton			Sam Johnson Sportsground, Renown Park	ASFL	1945	1979–1980	0	-	Moved to Southern Metropolitan FL in 1981
Burnside Kensington			Bill Cooper Oval, Newland Park, Erindale	SAFA	1979	1981–2001	2	1988	Folded in 2002
Campbelltown Magill			Campbelltown Memorial Oval, Paradise	NMFL	1976	1985–1997	0	-	Folded in 1998
Cedars	(1992-2002)(2003-04)	Cedars	Croydon High School, West Croydon	–	1992	1992–1993, 2001–2004	1	2004	Recess between 1994 and 2000. Folded in 2005
Collegians				–	1941	1941	0	-	De-merged into Prince Alfred OC and Pulteney in 1946
Combined Banks		Bankers		–	1937	1937-1940	0	-	Folded in 1941
Commonwealth Bank		Bankers		ETFA	1950	1952-1956	0	-	Folded in 1956
Croydon				–	1980	1981–1982	0	-	Folded in 1982
Dulwich			Victoria Park Race Course, Adelaide	ETFA	1919	1922-1924	0	-	Folded in 1935
East Adelaide				–	1910s	1920	0	-	Moved to YMCAFA after 1920 season
Eastwood (Eastwood Rechabite 1935-37)			Carriageway Park (Park 17), Adelaide	ETFA, NNFA	1930s	1935–1937, 1956–1963, 1977–1983	2	1957	Moved to East Torrens FA in 1938. Joined Adelaide Metropolitan FL in 1946 and 1964. Folded in 1984.
Edwardstown Baptist				UCFA	1973	1975, 1980–1992	2	1986	Folded in 1993
Ethelton	(1980s)(1990s)	Roos	EP Nazer Reserve, Ethelton	WTDFA	1911	1956–1996	3	1982	Merged with Alberton United and Riverside to form Portland in 1997
Exeter		Tigers	Largs Reserve, Largs Bay	SAJFL	1930s	1933–1978	8	1968	Merged with Semaphore Central in 1979 to form Port District
Ferryden Park		Lions	Ferryden Park Reserve, Ferryden Park	NADFA, SAFA	1964	1968–1977, 1985–1995	5	1976	Played in South Australian FA between 1978 and 1984. Folded in 1995
Glenferrie				–	1905	1911-1921	0	-	Folded in 1922
Golden North					1990s	1999	0	-	Folded in 2000s
Goodwood	(1922-36)(1949-68)(1969-78)	Tigers	Goodwood Oval, Millswood	SMFL, ASFA	1920s	1922–1925, 1931–1936, 1941–1944, 1946–1978	4	1972	Played in Mid-Southern FA between 1926 and 1930. Entered recess in 1937. Played in Adelaide Suburban FAin 1945. Returned to Southern Metropolitan FL in 1979
Grange			Grange Oval, Grange	ASFA, WTDFA	1920	1920–1922, 1927–1936, 1955–1957	1	1934	Played in West Torrens District FA between 1923 and 1926. Moved to Adelaide Suburban FA in 1937. Merged with Henley to form Henley and Grange in 1958
Greek		Blues	Weigall Oval, North Plympton	–	1960s	1969–1986	3	1985	Merged with Camden to form Greek Camden in 1987; de-merged in 1994. Merged with Henley District OS to form Henley Greek in 1995
Greek Camden		Blues	Camden Oval, Novar Gardens	–	1987	1987–1993	3	1991	De-merged into Greek and Camden in 1994
Henley (1)		Two Blues	Henley Memorial Oval, Henley Beach	WTDFA	1947	1953-1957	3	1954	Merged with Grange to form Henley and Grange in 1958
Henley (2) (Henley & Grange 1958-70)		Eagles	Henley Memorial Oval, Henley Beach	–	1958	1958–1977	3	1973	Merged with Henley High OS to form Henley District and Old Scholars in 1978
Henley District and Old Scholars		Sharks	Henley Memorial Oval, Henley Beach	–	1978	1978–1981	1	1979	Moved to South Australian FA in 1982
Henley High OS		Vikings	Henley High School, Henley Beach	–	1974	1974–1977	2	1976	Merged with Henley to form Henley District and Old Scholars in 1978
Hindmarsh CYMS			St Michael's College, Henley Beach		c. 1900s	1968–1974	0	-	Merged with St Michael's College to form St Michael's Old Scholars and Hindmarsh (SMOSH) in 1975
Holden's Motor			Mistletoe Park (Park 11), Adelaide		1923	1936	0	-	Folded in 1937
Immanuel OS	(?-1982-?)(1980-?, ?-1992)	Double Blues	Immanuel College, Novar Gardens	SMFL	1970s	1980-1991	1	1980	Folded in 1992
Kaurna Eagles (Glandore 1984-2001; Glandore Eagles 2002-03)		Eagles	Mawson Lakes Oval, Mawson Lakes	SMFL	1954	1985–2007	4	2002	Folded after 2007 season
Kelvinator			Weigall Oval, North Plympton	ASFA	1943	1946-1952	0	-	Moved to Southern Metropolitan FL in 1953
Kenilworth-Burnside-Kensington				–	1997	1997	0	-	De-merged into Kenilworth and Burnside-Kensington in 1998
Kenilworth Colonel Light				–	1986	1986–1990	2	1989	De-merged into Kenilworth and Colonel Light Gardens in 1991
Kensington			Victoria Park Race Course, Adelaide	ETFA	1925	1933-1935	1	1933	Folded in 1935
Kingswood (1)		Woods	Veale Park (Park 21), Adelaide	–	1900s	1913–1932	2	1915	Folded in 1932
Kingswood (2) (National Australia Bank 1971-83)	(1971-83) (1984-91)	Bankers	Kingswood Oval, Kingswood	–	1960s	1971–1991	4	1984	Folded in 1992
Long Range Weapons			Penfield Oval, Penfield	–	1953	1953-1957	0	-	Folded in 1957
Marryatville			Victoria Park Race Course, Adelaide	ETFA	1920s	1926-1927	0	-	Folded in 1928
Marlborough				–	1910	1911-1913	0	-	Folded in 1914
Mile End (Wattle Park TC 1957-72; Murray Park CAE 1973-83; Murray Park Teachers 1984-85; SA College & Teachers 1986-89)		Cats	Railways Oval, Adelaide	–	1957	1957–1990	0	-	Moved to Northern Metropolitan FL in 1991
Mount Barker		Barkeroos	Hanson Oval, Mount Barker	HFA	1881	1930-1932	0	-	Moved to Mount Lofty FA in 1933.
Myer			Myer Oval	AMFL	1948	1953–1957	0	-	Folded in 1958
North Brighton Somerton			Brighton Secondary College, North Brighton	SMFL	1950	1952-1953	0	-	Folded in 1954
North Pines		Redbacks	Andrew Smith Reserve, Parafield Gardens	–	1993	1993–2007, 2009, 2011–2014, 2016–2017	2	2003	Recess in 2008, 2010 and 2015. Folded in 2018
Norwood Union	(1983-91)(1993-94)		Brookway Park, Campbelltown	SMFL	1902	1983–1991, 1993–1994	1	1983	Recess in 1992. Merged with Payneham to form Payneham Norwood Union in 1995
Nunga Community				ASFA	1970s	1980	0	-	Folded in 1981
Ovingham		Cats	Cane Reserve, Prospect	ASFL, NMFL	1906	1980–1985, 1989–2006, 2009–2013	4	2008	Moved to Southern Metropolitan FL in 1986. Recess between 2007 and 2008. Folded in 2013
Para District Uniting			Parks Community Centre, Angle Park	NMFL	1988	1988–1990	0	-	Folded in 1991
Para Houghton			Houghton Oval, Houghton	ASFL	1955	1980-1982	0	-	Folded in 1983
Paralowie	(1990s) (?-2010)	Kangaroos	Yalumba Drive Reserve, Paralowie	NMFL	1979	1994–2010	1	2008	Folded in 2010
Payneham	(1938-48)(1949-59)(1960-79)	Demons	Payneham Oval, Payneham	ETFA	1901	1938–1944, 1946–1979	8	1978	Recess in 1945. Moved to South Australian FA in 1980
Plympton High OS		Phantoms	NS Bull Memorial Oval, Plympton	–	1971	1971–1993	5	1991	Merged with Camden to form PHOS Camden in 1994
Port Adelaide United				ASFA	1970s	1980–1988	0	-	Folded in 1988
Post-Tel Institute			GS Kingston Park (Park 23), Adelaide	ASFA, AMFL	1944	1948–1951, 1966–1988	1	1966	Entered recess in 1952, re-formed in Adelaide Metropolitan FL in 1953. Folded in 1989
Prince Alfred College				–	1870s	1913–1921	0	-	Folded in 1921
Prospect				–	1900s	1921	0	-	Moved to North Adelaide District FA in 1923
Queens Old Collegians				–	1947	1947-1949	0	-	Folded in 1950
Renown Park	(1983-85)(1986)	Roosters	Sam Johnson Sportsground, Renown Park	–	1983	1983–1986	1	1983	Merged with St Dominic's and St Peter's YCW to form Fitzroy in 1987
Riverside		Rivvies	Riverside Oval, Port Adelaide	ASFA	1928	1949–1996	12	1995	Merged with Ethelton and Alberton United to form Portland in 1997
Royal Park		Roosters	Carnegie South Reserve, Royal Park	AMFL	1960s	1968–1978, 1983	1	1973	1979-82 unknown. Folded in 1984
Salesian (Salesian Old Collegians 1973-79)	(1973)(1974-79)(1985-89)	Violet Crumbles	Salesian College, Brooklyn Park	NNFA, SMFL	1969	1973–1979, 1985–1989	1	1985	Played in Glenelg-South Adelaide FA between 1980 and 1984. Folded in 1990
Salisbury Central						1985–1996	0	-	Folded in 1996
Salisbury College (Salisbury Teachers' College 1970-72; Salisbury CAE 1973-82)			Salisbury College, Salisbury East	NMFL	1970	1970–1974, 1977–1989	3	1985	Played in Northern Metropolitan FL in 1975-76. Absorbed by SA Institute of Technology in 1990
Salisbury West	(1970-77)(?-2018)	Tigers	Salisbury Downs Oval, Salisbury Downs	NMFL, SAFA	1965	1970–1977, 1996–2018	4	2016	Returned to Northern Metropolitan FL in 1978. Folded in 2018
Salvation Army		Salvos, Saints	Windsor Gardens Oval, Windsor Gardens			1999–2000, 2002	0	-	Recess in 2001. Folded in 2003
Semaphore Central		Magpies	Largs Reserve, Largs Bay	–	1873	1912–1978	13	1972	Merged with Exeter in 1979 to form Port District
South Adelaide Ramblers		Ramblers, Panthers	Blue Gum Park, Adelaide	YMCAFA	1910s	1927-1929	0	-	Moved to South Adelaide District FA following 1929 season
St Augustine			South Parklands, Adelaide	UCFA	1900s	1928-1933	0	-	Folded in 1933
St Bartholemew				–	1900s	1911-1914	0	-	Entered recess in 1914; re-formed in United Church FA in 1924
St Dominic's	(1963-81)(1982-86)		St Dominic's Oval, North Adelaide	NADFA	1940s	1963–1986	0	-	Merged with Renown Park and St Peter's YCW to form Fitzroy in 1987
St Francis Xavier				–	1911	1911-1914	0	-	Folded in 1924
St Michael's OS and Hindmarsh (SMOSH)		Lions	Carnegie South Reserve, Royal Park	–	1975	1975–1995	5	1994	Merged with West Lakes to form SMOSH West Lakes in 1996
St Peter's School College				–	1870s	1912–1921	0	-	Folded in the 1920s
St Peter's YCW	(1978)(1979-86)		Devitt Oval, Trinity Gardens	CYMSFA	1940s	1978–1986	0	-	Merged with Renown Park and St Dominic's to form Fitzroy in 1987
St Raphael's		Saints	Morgan Oval, Adelaide	AMFL		1977-1984	2	1983	Merged with Goodwood in 1985 to form Goodwood Saints
Sturt CAE (Bedford Park TC 1972)		Teachers	Sturt College of Advanced Education, Bedford Park	–	1972	1972–1980	0	-	Moved to Southern Metropolitan FL in 1981
Taperoo		Roos, Demons	Largs North Oval, Largs North	ASFA	1969	1971–1974, 1980–1983	0	-	Played in Adelaide Suburban FA between 1975 and 1979. Folded in 1984
The Parks				–	1981	1981–1983	1	1982	Folded in 1984
The Teachers				–	1961	1961–1965	0	-	Folded in 1965
Torrens CAE (Western Teachers' College 1962-72)	(1962-67)(1968-74)		Gladys Elphick Park (Park 25), Adelaide Park Lands	–	1962	1962–1974	1	1968	Moved to Southern Metropolitan FL in 1975
TransAdelaide (Australian National Railway Institute 1982-88, State Transport Authority 1989-93)			Oval on corner of Regency and South Roads, Regency Park	ASFA	1920s	1930, 1937–1995	1	1981	Merged with Adelaide Tigers to form TransAdelaide Tigers in 1996
TransAdelaide Tigers		Tigers	Oval on corner of Regency and South Roads, Regency Park	–	1996	1996–1998	0	-	Folded in 1998
Underdale United			West Park, Adelaide	SMFL	1919	1928-1940	3	1934	Folded in 1941
University of South Australia (South Australian Institute of Technology 1970-90)	(1970-83)(1984-90)(1991-92)	Crows	Mawson Lakes Oval, Mawson Lakes	–	1970	1970–1992	0	-	Folded in 1993
Unley Amateurs			South Parklands, Adelaide	–	1934	1934	0	-	Folded after 1934 season
West Adelaide United			Railways Oval, Adelaide	–	1935	1935-1937	3	1937	Folded in 1938
West Lakes (Semaphore Park 1951-74)	(1951-74)(1975-85)(1986-95)	Lakers	West Lakes Shore Oval, West Lakes Shore	PADFA, SAFA	1930	1951–1977, 1988–1995	5	1988	Played in SAFA between 1978 and 1984. Merged with SMOSH to form SMOSH West Lakes in 1996
Western Warriors	(2001-03)(2004-06)	Warriors	GS Kingston Park (Park 23), Adelaide Park Lands	–	2001	2001-2006	0	-	Folded in 2007
West Fields		Bloods, Wolves		NMFL	1960s	1985–1986	0	-	Returned to Northern Metropolitan FL in 1987
Wingfield Royals	(1982)(1983-?)(?-2014)	Royals, Wolves, Wingies	Eastern Parade Reserve, Ottoway	SMFL	1954	1982–1998, 2000–2014	2	2007	Recess in 1999. Folded in 2015
Woodville		Woodpeckers	Woodville Oval, Woodville South	PADFA	1938	1940–1958	3	1954	Moved to South Australian National FL in 1959
Woodville District						1979–1990	1	1980	Folded
Woodville West			Woodville West Oval, Woodville	–	1982	1983-1987	1	1983	Folded in 1988
YMCA			Mistletoe Park (Park 11), Adelaide	–	1920	1922–1934, 1936–1940	0	-	Recess in 1935. Folded in 1941

=== Former Clubs (Women's Only) ===
Club	Colours	Nickname	Home Ground	Former League	Est.	Years in AdFL	AdFL Women's Senior Premierships		Fate
Club	Colours	Nickname	Home Ground	Former League	Est.	Years in AdFL	Total	Most recent	Fate
Aldinga		Sharks	Aldinga Oval, Aldinga	SAWFL	1879	2017-2018	0	-	Moved to Southern FL in 2019
Blackwood		Woods	Blackwood Hill Reserve, Blackwood	SAWFL	1912	2017-2018	0	-	Fielded U18 Women's team for 2017 and 2018 only
Bridgewater Callington		Raiders	Bridgewater Oval, Bridgewater	–	2012	2018	0	-	Moved to Hills FL in 2019
Christies Beach		Saints	John Bice Memorial Oval, Christies Beach	SAWFL	1963	2017-2019	1	2017	Moved to Southern FL in 2020
Ironbank-Cherry Gardens		Thunderers	Cherry Gardens Ironbank Recreation Ground, Cherry Gardens	SAWFL	1986	2018	1	2018	Moved to Hills FL in 2019
Kanga Onka Valley		Double Blues	Johnston Memorial Park, Balhannah and Kangarilla Oval, Kangarilla	–	2017	2017-2018	0	-	De-merged into Kangarilla and Onkaparinga Valley in Hills FL in 2019
Mount Barker		Barkeroos	Hanson Oval, Mount Barker	SAWFL	1881	2017-2019	0	-	Moved to Hills FL in 2020
Mount Lofty		Mountain Devils	Heathfield Oval, Heathfield	SAWFL	1978	2017-2020	1	2018	Moved to Hills FL in 2021
Murraylands Swans		Swans	Johnstone Park, Murray Bridge	SAWFL	2016	2017-2018	0	-	Moved to Hills FL in 2019
Nairne Bremer United		Rams	Nairne Oval, Nairne	SAWFL	1978	2017-2018	0	-	Moved to Hills FL in 2019
Port Adelaide		Magpies	Alberton Oval, Alberton	SAWFL	1870	2003-2019	0	-	Taken over by North Haven in 2019
Strathalbyn		Roosters	Strathalbyn Oval, Strathalbyn	–	1879	2017	1	2017	Recess in 2018, re-formed in Great Southern FL in 2019
West Adelaide		Bloods	Richmond Oval, Richmond	SAWFL	1892	2017	0	-	Moved to SANFLW in 2018

== Division 1 ==
=== Club-by-club summary ===
This table summarises the total Division 1 premierships and grand finals from 1911 to 2026.

Club	Premiers won	Most Recent Premiership	Most Recent Grand Final	Runners up	Grand Finals
Adelaide University (Note: Previously known as "University" until 1969.)	23	1999	2006	20	43
Port District (Note: Semaphore Central and Exeter merged to form "Port District FC" in 1979. Nevertheless, PDFC set its date of establishment in 1873, as a continuity of Semaphore Central.)	14	2025	2025	10	24
Goodwood Saints	9	2020	2020	3	12
Adelaide College (Note: Defunct club.) (Note: Previously known as Adelaide Teachers College from 1972 to 1979, Teachers College from 1935 to 1972, Teachers Training College from 1923 to 1934.)	7	1982	1982	7	14
Broadview	6	2004	2004	6	12
Exeter (Note: Semaphore Central and Exeter merged to form "Port District FC" in 1979. Exeter had been founded in 1924 and is considered defunct, with Port District being a continuity of Semaphore Central)	5	1948	1955	4	9
Riverside (Note: Merged with Alberton United and Ethelton to form Portland in 1997.)	3	1984	1990	7	10
Kilburn	3	2001	2001	3	6
Prince Alfred OC	3	2023	2023	2	5
Underdale United	2	1934	1938	5	7
Payneham	2	1978	1978	3	5
Rostrevor OC	2	2017	2020	3	5
Gaza	2	2011	2011	2	4
Greek Camden	2	1991	1991	2	4
Kenilworth	2	1930	1930	2	4
PHOS Camden	2	2002	2002	1	3
Flinders Park	2	1977	1977	1	3
St. Peters OC	2	2012	2012	0	2
Walkerville	2	1953	1953	0	2
West Adelaide United	2	1937	1937	0	2
Kingswood	2	1915	1915	0	2
Payneham NU	1	2019	2021	3	4
Henley	1	2010	2012	2	3
Salisbury North	1	2026	2026	2	3
Tea Tree Gully	1	2018	2018	1	2
Greek	1	1985	1985	1	2
Seaton Ramblers	1	1973	1973	1	2
Rosewater	1	1957	1957	1	2
Woodville	1	1946	1947	1	2
Greenacres	1	1988	1988	0	1
Glenunga	0	-	2026	3	3
Sacred Heart OC	0	-	2011	2	2
Golden Grove	0	-	2025	1	1
Edwardstown (Note: Moved to Southern Football League in 2009.)	0	-	1996	1	1
SA Railways Institute	0	-	1941	1	1
Prospect	0	-	1921	1	1
Henley & Grange (Note: The current "Henley Sharks Football Club" was formed in 1994 as a merger of the Henley Districts, Old Scholars and Greek FC.)	0	-	1920	1	1
St. Francis Xavier	0	-	1912	1	1
Glenferrie	0	-	1911	1	1

=== Grand Finals ===
The following list summarises the Division 1 Grand Finals from 1911 to 2026.

Year	Premier	Score	Runner-Up	Score	Ground
1911	University	14.15 (99)	Glenferrie	5.11 (41)	University Oval
1912	University	12.9 (81)	St. Francis Xavier	5.11 (41)	University Oval
1913	Kingswood	5.8 (38)	Semaphore Central	4.6 (30)	
1914	Semaphore Central	6.12 (48)	University	4.11 (35)	Norwood Oval
1915	Kingswood	8.11 (59)	Semaphore Central	5.11 (41)	
1920	University	10.18 (78)	Henley and Grange	2.11 (23)	
1921	University	9.10 (64)	Prospect	7.11 (53)	
1922	University	9.9 (63)	Semaphore Central	8.4 (52)	
1923	Semaphore Central	6.10 (46)	University	5.5 (35)	Norwood Oval
1924	Semaphore Central	6.10 (46)	Teachers Training College	5.9 (39)	Norwood Oval
1925	Semaphore Central	9.16 (70)	Kenilworth	7.6 (48)	Norwood Oval
1926	University	9.15 (69)	Semaphore Central	7.18 (60)	Norwood Oval
1927	Kenilworth	10.18 (78)	University	10.9 (69)	Belair National Park
1928	Semaphore Central	10.13 (73)	Kenilworth	4.11 (35)	Thebarton Oval
1929	University	11.11 (77)	Semaphore Central	10.10 (70)	Jubilee Oval
1930	Kenilworth	12.15 (87)	University	12.13 (85)	Glenelg Oval
1931	Semaphore Central	12.11 (83)	Underdale United	9.16 (70)	University Oval
1932	University	14.11 (95)	Underdale United	11.13 (79)	Jubilee Oval
1933	Underdale United	6.15 (51)	University	6.10 (46)	Thebarton Oval
1934	Underdale United	11.11 (77)	University	8.11 (59)	Norwood Oval
1935	St Peter's O.C.	13.8 (86)	Underdale United	10.13 (73)	Unley Oval
1936	West Adelaide United	11.19 (85)	Underdale United	10.8 (68)	Thebarton Oval
1937	West Adelaide United	10.3 (63)	Prince Alfred O.C.	7.10 (52)	Prospect Oval
1938	Semaphore Central	14.12 (96)	Underdale United	10.10 (70)	Alberton Oval
1939	Exeter	15.11 (101)	Payneham	15.9 (99)	Prospect Oval
1940	Exeter	11.11 (77)	Semaphore Central	5.12 (42)	Alberton Oval
1941	Exeter	10.16 (76)	S.A. Railways Institute	8.6 (54)	Woodville Oval
1946	Woodville	8.13 (61)	University	9.5 (59)	Alberton Oval
1947	Exeter	14.14 (98)	Woodville	6.8 (44)	Alberton Oval
1948	Exeter	8.10 (58)	Semaphore Central	6.8 (44)	Woodville Oval
1949	Semaphore Central	8.11 (59)	University	4.10 (34)	Alberton Oval
1950	Walkerville	5.12 (42)	Exeter	6.3 (39)	Thebarton Oval
1951	University	6.8 (44)	Exeter	5.13 (43)	Thebarton Oval
1952	University	13.17 (105)	Exeter	10.7 (67)	Thebarton Oval
1953	Walkerville	8.10 (58)	University	7.8 (50)	Alberton Oval
1954	University	19.11 (125)	Rosewater	10.4 (64)	Alberton Oval
1955	University	18.5 (113)	Exeter	7.7 (49)	Alberton Oval
1956	Semaphore Central	11.8 (74)	University	6.10 (46)	Payneham Oval
1957	Rosewater	8.19 (67)	Semaphore Central	6.13 (49)	Kensington Oval
1958	Riverside	8.11 (59)	University	6.13 (49)	Alberton Oval
1959	Semaphore Central	15.10 (100)	Riverside	8.17 (65)	Kensington Oval
1960	University	6.4 (40)	Semaphore Central	2.6 (18)	Alberton Oval
1961	University	8.6 (54)	Kilburn	3.8 (26)	Alberton Oval
1962	University	8.14 (62)	Teachers College	7.5 (47)	Alberton Oval
1963	Teachers College	5.7 (37)	University	3.7 (25)	Alberton Oval
1964	Payneham	11.11 (77)	University	10.8 (68)	Norwood Oval
1965	University	14.15 (99)	Riverside	3.18 (36)	Alberton Oval
1966	Teachers College	9.11 (65)	University	3.7 (25)	Alberton Oval
1967	Teachers College	8.10 (58)	University	7.8 (50)	Alberton Oval
1968	University	9.10 (64)	Teachers College	6.5 (41)	Alberton Oval
1969	Adelaide University	7.8 (50)	Teachers College	4.7 (31)	Alberton Oval
1970	Semaphore Central	8.16 (66)	Teachers College	6.15 (51)	Alberton Oval
1971	Teachers College	15.16 (106)	Seaton Ramblers	8.14 (62)	Alberton Oval
1972	Semaphore Central	13.11 (89)	Adelaide Teachers College	13.9 (87)	Alberton Oval
1973	Seaton Ramblers	14.8 (92)	Payneham	10.6 (66)	Alberton Oval
1974	Adelaide University	16.11 (107)	Payneham	7.5 (47)	Adelaide Oval
1975	Adelaide University	14.15 (99)	Flinders Park	4.9 (33)	Adelaide Oval
1976	Flinders Park	19.20 (134)	Adelaide University	10.12 (72)	Richmond Oval
1977	Flinders Park	9.13 (67)	Semaphore Central	5.14 (44)	Richmond Oval
1978	Payneham	12.20 (92)	Glenunga	9.8 (62)	Richmond Oval
1979	Adelaide College	18.13 (121)	Broadview	15.10 (100)	Adelaide Oval
1980	Broadview	17.12 (114)	Adelaide College	4.18 (42)	Adelaide Oval
1981	Adelaide College	7.14 (56)	Riverside	6.5 (41)	Adelaide Oval
1982	Adelaide College	16.10 (106)	Riverside	11.10 (76)	Adelaide Oval
1983	Riverside	15.7 (97)	Adelaide University	11.11 (77)	Adelaide Oval
1984	Riverside	14.15 (99)	Greek	11.14 (80)	Norwood Oval
1985	Greek	16.9 (105)	Riverside	11.11 (77)	Alberton Oval
1986	Adelaide University	11.17 (83)	Riverside	12.8 (80)	Adelaide Oval
1987	Broadview	12.6 (78)	Greek Camden	7.15 (57)	Adelaide Oval
1988	Greenacres	11.13 (79)	Broadview	11.11 (77)	Adelaide Oval
1989	Broadview	18.13 (121)	Greek Camden	2.8 (20)	Adelaide Oval
1990	Greek Camden	18.12 (120)	Riverside	12.15 (87)	Alberton Oval
1991	Greek Camden	9.12 (66)	Kilburn	9.10 (64)	Alberton Oval
1992	Port District	17.8 (110)	Broadview	8.10 (58)	Alberton Oval
1993	Broadview	14.7 (91)	Kilburn	9.17 (71)	Adelaide Oval
1994	Kilburn	10.15 (75)	Port District	8.9 (57)	Adelaide Oval
1995	Kilburn	14.18 (102)	Broadview	11.15 (81)	Adelaide Oval
1996	Adelaide University	21.12 (138)	Edwardstown	13.9 (87)	Adelaide Oval
1997	Goodwood Saints	11.9 (75)	PHOS Camden	10.8 (68)	Adelaide Oval
1998	Broadview	18.13 (121)	Goodwood Saints	8.6 (54)	Adelaide Oval
1999	Adelaide University	5.13 (43)	Goodwood Saints	5.12 (42)	Adelaide Oval
2000	PHOS Camden	7.5 (47)	Broadview	6.6 (42)	Alberton Oval
2001	Kilburn	19.5 (119)	Adelaide University	14.7 (91)	Adelaide Oval
2002	PHOS Camden	11.17 (83)	Adelaide University	10.12 (72)	Adelaide Oval
2003	Gaza	10.15 (75)	Broadview	7.9 (51)	Adelaide Oval
2004	Broadview	9.11 (65)	Goodwood Saints	8.10 (58)	Adelaide Oval
2005	Goodwood Saints	13.10 (88)	Gaza	8.5 (53)	Adelaide Oval
2006	Goodwood Saints	18.11 (119)	Adelaide University	10.12 (72)	Alberton Oval
2007	Goodwood Saints	19.16 (130)	Gaza	11.7 (73)	Thebarton Oval
2008	Goodwood Saints	13.9 (87)	Salisbury North	9.4 (58)	Thebarton Oval
2009	Goodwood Saints	11.13 (79)	Henley	8.12 (60)	Thebarton Oval
2010	Henley	11.6 (72)	Sacred Heart OC	7.5 (47)	Thebarton Oval
2011	Gaza	10.13 (73)	Sacred Heart OC	9.15 (69)	Thebarton Oval
2012	St Peter's O.C.	15.13 (103)	Henley	13.15 (93)	Adelaide Airport Stadium
2013	Rostrevor OC	17.9 (111)	Salisbury North	10.9 (69)	Adelaide Airport Stadium
2014	Goodwood Saints	14.10 (94)	Rostrevor OC	7.7 (49)	Adelaide Airport Stadium
2015	Goodwood Saints	12.7 (79)	Payneham NU	7.9 (51)	Adelaide Airport Stadium
2016	Prince Alfred OC	10.13 (73)	Tea Tree Gully	6.10 (46)	Adelaide Airport Stadium
2017	Rostrevor OC	10.8 (68)	Payneham NU	3.13 (31)	ALDI Arena
2018	Tea Tree Gully	13.15 (93)	Rostrevor OC	9.9 (63)	ALDI Arena
2019	Payneham NU	12.4 (76)	Prince Alfred OC	10.12 (72)	Guardall Security Stadium
2020	Goodwood Saints	9.12 (66)	Rostrevor OC	7.8 (50)	Norwood Oval
2021	Prince Alfred OC	13.13 (91)	Payneham NU	8.4 (52)	Hisense Stadium (Richmond Oval)
2022	Port District	9.9 (63)	Prince Alfred OC	7.3 (45)	Norwood Oval
2023	Prince Alfred OC	9.15 (69)	Glenunga	8.7 (55)	Norwood Oval
2024	Port District	9.10 (64)	Glenunga	6.8 (44)	Norwood Oval
2025	Port District	14.8 (92)	Golden Grove	6.5 (41)	Norwood Oval
2026	Salisbury North	9.13 (67)	Glenunga	8.7 (55)	Norwood Oval

== Senior Premierships ==
=== Men's ===
Year	D1	D2	D3	D4	D5	D6	D7	D8					
2026	Salisbury North	Henley	Seaton Ramblers	Scotch OC	Greenacres	Gaza	Adelaide Lutheran	7 divisions (2016-)					
2025	Port District	Tea Tree Gully	Westminster OS	Plympton	Marion	Fitzroy	Elizabeth	7 divisions (2016-)					
2024	Port District	Rostrevor OC	Henley	Kilburn	Mitcham	Eastern Park	Para Hills	7 divisions (2016-)					
2023	Prince Alfred OC	Golden Grove	Flinders Park	CBC Old Collegians	Kilburn	Greenacres	Ingle Farm	7 divisions (2016-)					
2022	Port District	Broadview	Golden Grove	Pembroke OS	Hectorville	Trinity OS	Greenacres	7 divisions (2016-)					
2021	Prince Alfred OC	Old Ignatians	North Haven	Morphettville Park	Pooraka	Elizabeth	Brahma Lodge	7 divisions (2016-)					
2020	Goodwood Saints	Tea Tree Gully	Golden Grove	Walkerville	Lockleys	Hectorville	Brahma Lodge	7 divisions (2016-)					
2019	Payneham Norwood Union	Athelstone	Glenunga	CBC Old Collegians	Hope Valley	Fitzroy	St Paul's OS	7 divisions (2016-)					
2018	Tea Tree Gully	St Peter's OC	Scotch OC	Glenunga	CBC Old Collegians	Trinity OS	Marion	7 divisions (2016-)					
2017	Rostrevor OC	Henley	Brighton DOS	North Haven	Glenunga	Pulteney	Adelaide Lutheran	7 divisions (2016-)					
2016	Prince Alfred OC	Modbury	Pembroke OS	Westminster OS	Hectorville	Woodville South	Salisbury West	7 divisions (2016-)					
2015	Goodwood Saints	Prince Alfred OC	PHOS Camden	Kilburn	Para Hills	Smithfield	Mitchell Park	Unley Mercedes Jets	8 divisions (2012-2015)				
2014	Goodwood Saints	Payneham Norwood Union	Modbury	Golden Grove	Westminster OS	Blackfriars OS	Smithfield	Prince Alfred OC	8 divisions (2012-2015)				
2013	Rostrevor OC	Portland	Payneham Norwood Union	Plympton	Kenilworth	Westminster OS	Ingle Farm	Modbury	8 divisions (2012-2015)				
2012	St Peter's OC	Tea Tree Gully	Kilburn	Unley Mercedes Jets	Brahma Lodge	Woodville South	Mitchell Park	Broadview	8 divisions (2012-2015)				
2011	Gaza	St Peter's OC	Flinders Park	Kilburn	Plympton	Kenilworth	Sacred Heart OC	7 divisions (2007-2011)					
2010	Henley	Eastern Park	Old Ignatians	Pooraka	Hectorville	West Croydon	Adelaide University	7 divisions (2007-2011)					
2009	Goodwood Saints	Broadview	Walkerville	Prince Alfred OC	Pulteney	Hectorville	Henley	7 divisions (2007-2011)					
2008	Goodwood Saints	Modbury	Flinders Park	Portland	Golden Grove	Westminster OS	Paralowie	7 divisions (2007-2011)					
2007	Goodwood Saints	Port District	SMOSH West Lakes	Salisbury	Fitzroy	Blackfriars OS	Colonel Light Gardens	7 divisions (2007-2011)					
	D1	D2	D3	D4	D5	D6	D7	D8	D9A	D9B	D10A	D10B	12 divisions (1998-2005)
2006	Goodwood Saints	Tea Tree Gully	Payneham Norwood Union	Salisbury West	Para Hills	Central United	Blackfriars OS	Adelaide University	Goodwood Saints	Scotch OC	Seaton Ramblers	Gepps Cross	12 divisions (1998-2005)
	D1	D2	D3	D4	D5	D6	D7	D8	D9 North	D9 South	D10 North	D10 South	12 divisions (1998-2005)
2005	Goodwood Saints	Edwardstown	Modbury	Payneham Norwood Union	Ingle Farm	Elizabeth	West Croydon	Rostrevor OC	Modbury	St Peter's OC	Adelaide University	Pembroke OS	12 divisions (1998-2005)
2004	Broadview	Henley	Prince Alfred OC	Modbury	CBC Old Collegians	Adelaide Lutheran	Henley	Rostrevor OC	Cedars	Scotch OC	Adelaide University	Ovingham	12 divisions (1998-2005)
2003	Gaza	Rostrevor OC	Walkerville	SMOSH West Lakes	Rosewater	Golden Grove	Adelaide University	Goodwood Saints	Gepps Cross	Scotch OC	North Pines	St Paul's OS	12 divisions (1998-2005)
2002	PHOS Camden	Gepps Cross	Woodville South	Para Hills	Glandore	Mitchell Park	Flinders University	Edwardstown	Kilburn	PHOS Camden	Gepps Cross	Scotch OC	12 divisions (1998-2005)
2001	Kilburn	Pooraka	Sacred Heart OC	Woodville South	Modbury	Salisbury	Broadview	Tea Tree Gully	Port District	PHOS Camden	Hectorville	Edwardstown	12 divisions (1998-2005)
2000	PHOS Camden	Gaza	Flinders Park	Portland	Pulteney	Para Hills	Westminster OS	Adelaide University	Kilburn	Goodwood Saints	Port District	Flinders Park	12 divisions (1998-2005)
1999	Adelaide University	Glandore	Walkerville	Salisbury West	St Paul's OS	Pulteney	Houghton	Tea Tree Gully	Adelaide University	PHOS Camden	Payneham Norwood Union	SMOSH West Lakes	12 divisions (1998-2005)
1998	Broadview	Port District	Glandore	Pembroke OS	Eastern Park	West Croydon	Pulteney	Henley	Modbury	PHOS Camden	Greenacres	Old Ignatians	12 divisions (1998-2005)
	D1	D2	D3	D4	D5	D6	D7	D8 North	D8 South	D9 North	D9 South	D10 North	D10 South
1997	Goodwood Saints	Pooraka	Scotch OC	Salisbury West	Pembroke OS	Eastern Park	Salisbury	Adelaide University	Adelaide University	Pooraka	Goodwood Saints	Modbury	Adelaide University
	A1	P1	A2	P2	A3	P3	A4	A5	A6	A7	A8	A9	A10
1996	St Peter's OC	Adelaide University	Unley	Athelstone	Mitcham	Flinders Park	Central United	Broadview	Flinders University	Kilburn	Salisbury North	PHOS Camden	Pembroke OS
	A1	A2	A3	A4	A5 North	A5 South	A6 North	A6 South	A7 North	A7 South	A8 North	A8 South	12 divisions (1994-1995)
1995	Kilburn	St Peter's OC	Fitzroy	Glenunga	Smithfield	Colonel Light Gardens	Wingfield Royals	Port District	Old Ignatians	SMOSH	Gepps Cross	Riverside	12 divisions (1994-1995)
	A1	A2	A3	A4	A5	A6	A7	A8	A9	A10	A11	A12	12 divisions (1994-1995)
1994	Kilburn	Modbury	SMOSH	Hope Valley	Ingle Farm	Alberton United	Modbury	Adelaide University	SMOSH	Hectorville	Gaza	Unley	12 divisions (1994-1995)
1993	Broadview	Sacred Heart OC	Greenacres	Lockleys	Unley	Colonel Light Gardens	North Pines	Rostrevor OC	SMOSH	Riverside	CBC Old Collegians	11 divisions (1991-1993)	
1992	Port District	Riverside	Modbury	Walkerville	Lockleys	Glandore	Rostrevor OC	Brighton DOS	Port District	Adelaide Lutheran	Fitzroy	11 divisions (1991-1993)	
1991	Greek Camden	Rostrevor OC	Brighton DOS	Adelaide Lutheran	Hectorville	Ovingham	Broadview	Brighton DOS	Riverside	Seaton Ramblers	Plympton High OS	11 divisions (1991-1993)	
1990	Greek Camden	Goodwood Saints	Seaton Ramblers	Tea Tree Gully	CBC Old Collegians	Walkerville	Woodville South	Adelaide University	Kilburn	Walkerville	Adelaide University	SA Institute of Technology	12 Divisions (1989-1990)
1989	Broadview	Scotch OC	Plympton High OS	Kenilworth Colonel Light	Modbury	Ingle Farm	Ovingham	Woodville South	Tea Tree Gully	Gepps Cross	Modbury	Broadview	12 Divisions (1989-1990)
1988	Greenacres	Kilburn	Rosewater	Burnside-Kensington	Adelaide Lutheran	West Lakes	SA Institute of Technology	Greek Camden	Adelaide University	Pembroke OS	Modbury	11 divisions (1985-1988)	
1987	Broadview	Pulteney	Goodwood Saints	Gepps Cross	Mitcham	Hope Valley	Broadview	Riverside	Glenunga	Woodville South	Brighton High OS	11 divisions (1985-1988)	
1986	Adelaide University	Rostrevor OC	Woodville South	Brighton High OS	Edwardstown Baptist	Adelaide Lutheran	Banksia Park OS	Adelaide University	Adelaide University	Kenilworth Colonel Light	Pembroke OS	11 divisions (1985-1988)	
1985	Greek	St Peter's OC	Port Adelaide Presbyterian	Glenunga	Salisbury College	Salesian OC	Broadview	Banksia Park OS	Rostrevor OC	Greek	Woodville South	11 divisions (1985-1988)	
1984	Riverside	Greenacres	Port District	Port Adelaide Presbyterian	Gepps Cross	Salisbury College	National Bank	Banksia Park OS	Rostrevor OC	CBC Old Collegians	10 divisions (1981-1984)		
1983	Riverside	St Peter's OC	Woodville South	St Raphael's	Norwood Union	Renown Park	West Croydon	Riverside	Scotch OC	Woodville West	10 divisions (1981-1984)		
1982	Adelaide College	Greek	Ethelton	Port Adelaide Presbyterian	Wingfield Royals	The Parks	SMOSH	Seaton Ramblers	Adelaide University	St Peter's OC	10 divisions (1981-1984)		
1981	Adelaide College	Seaton Ramblers	Kenilworth	Old Ignatians	ANZ Bank	SA Railways Institute	Edwardstown Baptist	Croydon	Gaza	Burnside-Kensington	10 divisions (1981-1984)		
1980	Broadview	West Croydon	Prince Alfred OC	Rostrevor OC	Woodville District	Immanuel OS	Broadview	Adelaide University	Scotch OC	9 divisions (1980)			
1979	Adelaide College	Pulteney	Walkerville	Plympton High OS	Salisbury College	Rosewater	SMOSH	Henley High OS	8 divisions (1975-1979)				
1978	Payneham	Kilburn	Gaza	Greenacres	St Raphael's	Walkerville	Kilburn	Adelaide University	8 divisions (1975-1979)				
1977	Flinders Park	Glenunga	Kilburn	West Croydon	Plympton High OS	Payneham	Glenunga	Kilburn	8 divisions (1975-1979)				
1976	Flinders Park	Ferryden Park	Old Ignatians	National Bank	Greenacres	Ferryden Park	Adelaide College	Henley High OS	8 divisions (1975-1979)				
1975	Adelaide University	Kings OC	Gaza	Old Ignatians	National Bank	Ferryden Park	Gaza	Mitcham	8 divisions (1975-1979)				
1974	Adelaide University	Broadview	Kings OC	Sacred Heart OC	Henley High OS	Flinders Park	Pulteney	7 divisions (1970-1974)					
1973	Seaton Ramblers	Henley and Grange	Westminster OS	Royal Park	Old Ignatians	Flinders Park	Henley and Grange	7 divisions (1970-1974)					
1972	Semaphore Central	Rosewater	Prince Alfred OC	Payneham	Plympton High OS	Broadview	Goodwood	7 divisions (1970-1974)					
1971	Adelaide College	St Peter's OC	Alberton United	Brighton High OS	SA Institute of Technology	St Dominic's	National Bank	7 divisions (1970-1974)					
1970	Semaphore Central	Seaton Ramblers	Ferryden Park	Allenby Gardens	Brighton High OS	Flinders Park	Rosewater	7 divisions (1970-1974)					
1969	Adelaide University	Flinders University	Kilburn	Ferryden Park	Payneham	Brighton High OS	6 divisions (1968-1969)						
1968	Adelaide University	Western Teachers College	Flinders University	Mitcham	Flinders Park	Exeter	6 divisions (1968-1969)						
1967	Adelaide College	Goodwood	Kings OC	Semaphore Park	Broadview	5 divisions (1966-1967)							
1966	Adelaide College	Prince Alfred OC	Post-Tel Institute	Flinders University	Walkerville	5 divisions (1966-1967)							
1965	Adelaide University	Henley and Grange	Adelaide University	Glenunga	4 divisions (1962-1965)								
1964	Payneham	Riverside	Broadview	Flinders Park	4 divisions (1962-1965)								
1963	Adelaide College	Exeter	Pulteney	Payneham	4 divisions (1962-1965)								
1962	Adelaide University	Alberton United	Gaza	Colonel Light Gardens	4 divisions (1962-1965)								
1961	Adelaide University	Glenunga	Seaton Ramblers	Pulteney	Adelaide University	5 divisions (1956-1961)							
1960	Adelaide University	Kilburn	Glenunga	Brighton	St Peter's OC	5 divisions (1956-1961)							
1959	Semaphore Central	Brighton	Kilburn	Scotch OC	Adelaide College	5 divisions (1956-1961)							
1958	Riverside	Prince Alfred OC	Brighton	Riverside	Kilburn	5 divisions (1956-1961)							
1957	Rosewater	Adelaide College	Eastwood	Ethelton	Semaphore Park	5 divisions (1956-1961)							
1956	Semaphore Central	Flinders Park	Exeter	Eastwood	Ethelton	5 divisions (1956-1961)							
1955	Adelaide University	Payneham	Semaphore Park	Pulteney	4 divisions (1953-1955)								
1954	Adelaide University	Henley	Woodville	Henley	4 divisions (1953-1955)								
1953	Walkerville	Rosewater	Henley	Birkenhead Sports	4 divisions (1953-1955)								
1952	Adelaide University	St Peter's OC	Semaphore Central	3 divisions (1947-1952)									
1951	Adelaide University	Prince Alfred OC	Semaphore Park	3 divisions (1947-1952)									
1950	Walkerville	Riverside	Rosewater	3 divisions (1947-1952)									
1949	Semaphore Central	Colonel Light Gardens	Flinders Park	3 divisions (1947-1952)									
1948	Exeter	Alberton United	Goodwood	3 divisions (1947-1952)									
1947	Exeter	Goodwood	Christian Brothers OC	3 divisions (1947-1952)									
1946	Woodville	Prince Alfred OC	2 divisions (1928-1946)										
1945	No competition due to WWII		2 divisions (1928-1946)										
1944	No competition due to WWII		2 divisions (1928-1946)										
1943	No competition due to WWII		2 divisions (1928-1946)										
1942	No competition due to WWII		2 divisions (1928-1946)										
1941	Exeter	Woodville	2 divisions (1928-1946)										
1940	Exeter	Walkerville	2 divisions (1928-1946)										
1939	Exeter	Kenilworth	2 divisions (1928-1946)										
1938	Semaphore Central	Walkerville	2 divisions (1928-1946)										
1937	West Adelaide United	Alberton United	2 divisions (1928-1946)										
1936	West Adelaide United	Walkerville	2 divisions (1928-1946)										
1935	St Peter's OC	West Adelaide United	2 divisions (1928-1946)										
1934	Underdale United	Henley and Grange	2 divisions (1928-1946)										
1933	Underdale United	Kensington	2 divisions (1928-1946)										
1932	Adelaide University	Colonel Light Gardens	2 divisions (1928-1946)										
1931	Semaphore Central	Alberton United	2 divisions (1928-1946)										
1930	Kenilworth	St Peter's OC	2 divisions (1928-1946)										
1929	Adelaide University	Adelaide College	2 divisions (1928-1946)										
1928	Semaphore Central	Underdale United	2 divisions (1928-1946)										
1927	Kenilworth	1 division (1911-1927)											
1926	Adelaide University	1 division (1911-1927)											
1925	Semaphore Central	1 division (1911-1927)											
1924	Semaphore Central	1 division (1911-1927)											
1923	Semaphore Central	1 division (1911-1927)											
1922	Adelaide University	1 division (1911-1927)											
1921	Adelaide University	1 division (1911-1927)											
1920	Adelaide University	1 division (1911-1927)											
1919	No competition due to WWI	1 division (1911-1927)											
1918	No competition due to WWI	1 division (1911-1927)											
1917	No competition due to WWI	1 division (1911-1927)											
1916	No competition due to WWI	1 division (1911-1927)											
1915	Kingswood	1 division (1911-1927)											
1914	Semaphore Central	1 division (1911-1927)											
1913	Kingswood	1 division (1911-1927)											
1912	Adelaide University	1 division (1911-1927)											
1911	Adelaide University	1 division (1911-1927)											

=== Women's ===
Year	D1	D2	D3	D4	D5	D6	D7
2026	Broadview	Hectorville	Mitcham	Plympton	Wilderness OS	Lockleys	6 divisions (2022-)
2025	Morphettville Park	Angle Vale	Port District	Glenunga	Marion	Seaton Ramblers	6 divisions (2022-)
2024	Payneham Norwood Union	Happy Valley	Angle Vale	Mitcham	Edwardstown	Marion	6 divisions (2022-)
2023	Morphettville Park	Goodwood Saints	Hope Valley	Hectorville	Loreto OS	Golden Grove	6 divisions (2022-)
2022	SMOSH West Lakes	Henley	Goodwood Saints	Pulteney	Eastern Park	Edwardstown	6 divisions (2022-)
2021	Morphettville Park	Old Ignatians	Blackfriars OS	Goodwood Saints	Gepps Cross	Lockleys	Modbury
2020	SMOSH West Lakes	Happy Valley	Flinders University	Mitcham	Goodwood Saints	5 divisions (2019-2020)	
2019	Adelaide University	Payneham Norwood Union	Broadview	Scotch OC	Flinders Park	5 divisions (2019-2020)	
2018	Salisbury	Mount Lofty	Happy Valley	Broadview	Old Ignatians	Ironbank Cherry Gardens	6 divisions (2018)
2017	Adelaide University	Christies Beach	Gaza	Adelaide University	Strathalbyn	5 divisions (2017)	

== Controversy ==
=== Violence and abuse ===
The league has received media publicity over a number of incidents occurring at matches in recent years.

2005

- After the 2005 Division 4 Grand Final, Salisbury West forfeited promotion, had premiership points deducted for the 2006 season and five players received a total of 38 games suspension following a number of violent incidents during their heavy loss to Payneham Norwood Union.

2011

- Spectators at West Croydon were approached by sex workers during junior games to offer their services.

2012

- 19 May – Police were called after a spectator wielded a knife and another used a broken beer bottle as a weapon in a fight during a match between Ingle Farm and Trinity Old Scholars. Ingle Farm had to hire security guards and ban drinking in certain areas for their remaining home games of the season.
- 10 June – Three players were allegedly involved in an incident where their names were signed in permanent marker on a bar whilst representing the SAAFL in Tasmania as part of the Under-23 representative team.

2013

- 25 May: An alleged brawl involving up to 20 people occurred in the car park during a match involving Smithfield and Ingle Farm.
- 25 May: A Westminster Old Scholars player was allegedly attacked with a glass bottle during a match.
- 1 June: A Central United player was banned for life following a 'disgusting' act where he smeared faeces on the door of the umpires' changeroom following a match against Blackfriars Old Scholars.
- June: One player was sentenced to eight months jail following a "coward punch" against an opponent in a C2 Division match between Adelaide Lutheran and Seaton Ramblers.
- 15 June: Aboriginal Salisbury North coach Eugene Warrior was racially abused by a Henley supporter.
- 20 July: Two Smithfield players reported for striking a player and abusing umpires resulted in the Smithfield club being suspended from the league for the rest of the season.
- 7 September: Police were called after the Division 7 Grand Final between Ingle Farm and Angle Vale was called off with 10 minutes remaining when a wild brawl broke out between spectators.
- 27 September: A Salisbury North player was banned for life as a result of an incident in the Division 1 Grand Final, and two other Salisbury North players were also suspended.
- Central United had 10 Category A reports during the season, resulting in a combined total of 36 games suspension, with one player banned for life.
- Salisbury North had eight suspensions for a total of 35 games.
- Salisbury West punished three players who abused umpires by forcing them to officiate games without pay.

2014

- Smithfield were reinstated to the competition with stipulations around player behaviour. An incident in its Under 18 team involving umpire abuse and intimidation resulted in that team being withdrawn. Its coach was suspended for 18 months, one player was suspended for 8 matches, two other players suspended for four and two games. The club was also fined $2,000, and the A-Grade and B-Grade teams were penalised 8 premiership points each.
- Central United were deducted nine premiership points as a result of a player being suspended for spitting at and striking another player in a game played on 19 July 2014 against Blackfriars Old Scholars.
- Salisbury and Ingle Farm's Under 18 teams were each deducted six premiership points for involvement in a wild melee.
- A North Pines player was suspended for 32 weeks, resulting in a life ban, for attempting to headbutt, threatening and abusing an umpire and racial vilification during a Division 7 Semi-Final against Adelaide University. The match resulted in a forfeit after the North Pines team walked off the field to protest the umpiring and three of its players being reported. The team's coach was suspended for 12 months, every North Pines player was suspended for 4 games (suspended until the end of the 2017 season) and North Pines was fined $2000.

2015

- An Eastern Park player was suspended for ten weeks for recklessly knocking out an umpire's tooth in an on-field collision on 12 April 2015.
- Ingle Farm were forced to forfeit their C4 game against Pulteney on 9 May 2015 as a result of the club having no players available to play after a bench clearing brawl against Rosewater the previous week. One Ingle Farm player was banned for life after being identified as the instigator by the league's investigation committee.
- Salisbury's Under-18 Coach was suspended for the rest of 2015 and all of 2016 for failing to stop a melee that occurred during an Under-18 game against Mitcham on 10 May 2015, and for misleading the tribunal during the investigation. The club was also fined $500, one player suspended for six games, and the team was forced to forfeit its following two games due to lack of players.
- A Rosewater player was suspended for four matches for abusing and threatening an umpire during their 13 June game against Pulteney.
- Salisbury North were deducted eight premiership points for each of their teams and fined $4,000 following an incident in a C-Grade game against Plympton on 18 July. A player was suspended for 10 games for striking and misconduct, and the C-Grade team was suspended for the remainder of the season.
- Four people were arrested, including two allegedly armed with knives, following a brawl between two warring families during a junior game between Rosewater and West Croydon.
- Eastern Park and Salisbury West forfeited their junior games for one week as a result of an incident involving shoving and verbal abuse between parents from both clubs at an under-12 game on 2 August.

2016

- A Rosewater player was suspended for eight games for abusing and threatening an umpire during their 18 June game against CBC Old Collegians.
- A Rosewater player was suspended for 20 years and the club suspended from the competition after he pleaded guilty to striking an umpire in a Division 5 game against Blackfriars Old Scholars on 16 July. Another player was reported for undue rough play in the same game and refused to leave the ground until the umpire asked the Rosewater coach to remove him from the ground. Further controversy occurred the following weekend when a picture showing players doing an obscene hand gesture with a caption reading "f*** u saafl" was posted by a senior player to social media.

2017

- North Pines avoided expulsion from the league after a club official ran onto the field during play and twice punched an opposition player. The official was suspended for seven years, and the club was ordered to employ a full-time security guard at all home games.
- Salisbury North were deducted 6 premiership points after a player was suspended for four matches for abusing and threatening a Division 1 reserves umpire.

2018

- Salisbury West's captain received a 27-game suspension for four incidents, including breaking an opponent's jaw, during a home Qualifying Final against Trinity Old Scholars which resulted in a life ban; this more than doubled the Adelaide Footy League's threshold of 12 weeks. Despite Salisbury West winning the game by nine points, the club was ejected from the finals and suspended from the league for the rest of the year.
- Salisbury North were deregistered from the league after a player received an eight-week suspension for striking, and the league suspended all three of Salisbury North's senior teams for the rest of the 2018 season for breaking an amended affiliation agreement (AAA) regarding poor on-field behaviour.

2021

- A Central United player was suspended for 10 matches and deregistered from the competition after striking a runner from the opposition team in a Division 7 game against Adelaide Lutheran.

2024

- During a Division 3 match between Scotch OC and Pembroke Old Scholars at Norwood Oval, Scotch player Max Marslen was involved in an altercation with a spectator on the boundary line. Marslen was banned for nine weeks and the spectator was given a lifetime ban.

=== Unbalanced competition ===
The league received media coverage in 2014 due to extreme scores in a number of games.

- Consideration was given to reorganising the divisional structure after Kilburn Football Club, in Division 3, was beaten by a combined 736 points in their first two games of the season, whilst forfeiting their B-Grade matches on the same two occasions. Kilburn later forfeited an A-Grade game against Salisbury when a few players misunderstood the start time and a few others could not find their way to the ground.
- Brahma Lodge were relegated from the Division 4 competition after losing a number of players.
- Mitchell Park and Flinders University were both reduced to one team each, with Flinders University taking the place of Mitchell Park's reserves in the Division 6 Reserves competition, due to an exodus of players.
- Blackfriars Old Scholars set a new SAAFL record score when they posted 71.30 (460) in a 429-point win against Angle Vale in Division 6. This resulting in the Angle Vale coach, Peter McMillan, quitting the following Tuesday night at a crisis meeting and being replaced by Reserves coach Rob Warren.
- Wingfield Royals forfeited a match in Division 7 against Smithfield on 24 May following six straight losses by an average of 198 points.
- Both Kilburn (in Division 3 against Pembroke Old Scholars) and Angle Vale (in Division 6 against Ingle Farm) forfeited their A-Grade games on 5 July.
- Salisbury West requested to be relegated from Division 3 to Division 5 after losing more than half their squad when they did not pay them for the second half of the 2014 season.

=== Governance ===
An attempt to oust then President Gino Capogreco in October 2013 failed when the vote was defeated at an extraordinary meeting of the league. Mr. Capogreco was accused of altering a document and physically threatening a board member. Mr. Capogreco was later defeated at the following AGM.

== See also ==
- Australian rules football in South Australia
- SANFL
