= 1953 SAAFL season =

1953 premiership season
- Date: 18 April - 19 September
- Premiers: A1: Walkerville; A2: Rosewater; A3: Henley; A4: Birkenhead Sports; Colts: Payneham
- Minor premiers: A1: University; A2: Rosewater; A3: Henley; A4: Birkenhead Sports; Colts: Colonel Light Gardens
- Wooden spooners: A1: Goodwood; A2: Semaphore Central B A3: Flinders Park B A4: Teachers' College B Colts: Goodwood
- Best and fairest: A1 (Hone Medal): Alistair McLeod (University) and Jim Sawford (Semaphore Central); A2 (Chambers Medal): Jim Farr (Rosewater); A3 (McKay Medal): Ian McLeod (Railways' Institute); A4 (Treloar Medal): Max 'Moggie' Myers (Myer); Colts (Nazer Medal): Brian Blackwood (Flinders Park); War Memorial Medal: Barry Skinner (Exeter); Carnival Best: Merv Natt (Exeter)
- Leading goalkicker: A1: Alistair McLeod (University) 67 goals A3: Don Pryor (Henley) 118 goals

The 1953 SAAFL season was the 35th season of the South Australian Amateur Football League (SAAFL).

The season commenced on 18 April and concluded on 19 September.

Six new teams joined this season those being: Birkenhead Sports (from the Port Adelaide District Association, playing at I.C.I. Oval), Henley A & B (from the West Torrens District Association), Kenilworth B, Long Range Weapons (newly formed club playing at Penfield Oval, Salisbury), and Myer (from the Sturt District Association, playing at Myer Oval). One club, Kelvinator, left for Glenelg South West. This gave 40 senior teams from 27 clubs. The League expanded to 4 divisions with the addition of A4, as well as a Colts' Division for players Under 17 on 1 July.

== A1 ==
=== Ladder ===
| Pos | Team | Pld | W | L | D | PF | PA | Pts |
|---|---|---|---|---|---|---|---|---|
| 1 | University | 18 | 15 | 3 | 0 | 1907 | 1048 | 30 |
| 2 | Walkerville | 18 | 14 | 4 | 0 | 1451 | 1069 | 28 |
| 3 | Exeter | 18 | 12 | 6 | 0 | 1258 | 1169 | 24 |
| 4 | St. Peter's O.C. | 18 | 11 | 7 | 0 | 1577 | 1317 | 22 |
| 5 | Prince Alfred O.C. | 18 | 11 | 7 | 0 | 1246 | 1149 | 22 |
| 6 | Woodville | 18 | 8 | 10 | 0 | 1314 | 1461 | 16 |
| 7 | Flinders Park | 18 | 7 | 11 | 0 | 1482 | 1541 | 14 |
| 8 | Semaphore Central | 18 | 7 | 11 | 0 | 1354 | 1473 | 14 |
| 9 | Alberton Church United | 18 | 3 | 15 | 0 | 884 | 1703 | 6 |
| 10 | Goodwood | 18 | 2 | 16 | 0 | 988 | 1531 | 4 |

=== Finals ===
==== Semi Finals ====
| | Semi-finals |
| Saturday, 5 September | University 8.11 | def. by | Exeter 10.12 | Woodville Oval |
| Saturday, 5 September | Walkerville 10.16 | def. | St. Peter's O.C. 10.6 | Payneham Oval |

==== Final ====
Saturday, 12 September | Walkerville | def. | Exeter | Glenelg Oval
2.5; 4.8; 6.10; 7.11 | Q1; Q2; Q3; Final | 0.0; 0.2; 2.4; 7.7 | Umpires: L.G. McLean
Forster 2, Schultz 2, Gross 2, Smith | Goals | Lidstone 2, Critchton 2, Hobbs, J, Harvey, Drew
Edwards, Heylen, Schultz, Wilkingson, Gross | Best | Natt, Dodson, Skinner, Dawson, R. Harvey, Lidstone

==== Challenge Final ====
Saturday, 19 September | University | def. by | Walkerville | Alberton Oval
1.0 (6); 4.4 (28); 6.6 (42); 7.8 (50) | Q1; Q2; Q3; Final | 2.5 (17); 3.5 (23); 6.7 (43); 8.10 (58) | Umpires: L.G. 'Congie' McLean
Walsh 2, Giles, Duncan, Martin, Tunbridge, McLeod | Goals | Perkins 2, Daniels 2, Young, Smith, Jarrett, Saul
Tunbridge, Walsh, Giles | Best | Saul, Daniels, Barbary

== A2 ==
=== Ladder ===
| Pos | Team | Pld | W | L | D | PF | PA | Pts |
|---|---|---|---|---|---|---|---|---|
| 1 | Rosewater | 18 | 17 | 1 | 0 | 1651 | 939 | 34 |
| 2 | Kenilworth | 18 | 12 | 6 | 0 | 1387 | 1066 | 24 |
| 3 | King's O.C. | 18 | 11 | 6 | 1 | 1345 | 857 | 23 |
| 4 | Teachers' College | 18 | 10 | 8 | 0 | 1430 | 1152 | 20 |
| 5 | Colonel Light Gardens | 18 | 9 | 9 | 0 | 1183 | 1035 | 18 |
| 6 | Payneham | 18 | 9 | 9 | 0 | 1414 | 1450 | 18 |
| 7 | University B | 18 | 8 | 10 | 0 | 1434 | 1250 | 16 |
| 8 | Riverside | 18 | 7 | 10 | 1 | 1045 | 1079 | 15 |
| 9 | Semaphore Park | 18 | 6 | 12 | 0 | 1250 | 1516 | 12 |
| 10 | Semaphore Central B | 18 | 0 | 18 | 0 | 380 | 2279 | 0 |

=== Finals ===
==== Semi Finals ====
| | Semi-finals |
| Saturday, 5 September | Rosewater 13.11 | def. | King's O.C. 10.15 | Teachers' College Oval |
| Saturday, 12 September | Kenilworth 7.9 | def. by | Teachers' College 10.14 | Payneham Oval |

==== Final ====
Saturday, 19 September | Rosewater | def. | Teachers' College | Payneham Oval
15.21 | Q1; Q2; Q3; Final | 9.10 | Umpires: W.A. Henderson

== A3 ==
=== Ladder ===
| Pos | Team | Pld | W | L | D | PF | PA | Pts |
|---|---|---|---|---|---|---|---|---|
| 1 | Henley | 18 | 18 | 0 | 0 | 2377 | 430 | 36 |
| 2 | Railways' Institute | 18 | 14 | 4 | 0 | 1562 | 1035 | 28 |
| 3 | Woodville B | 18 | 12 | 6 | 0 | 1339 | 1130 | 24 |
| 4 | University C | 18 | 11 | 7 | 0 | 1297 | 902 | 22 |
| 5 | Commonwealth Bank | 18 | 11 | 7 | 0 | 1356 | 991 | 22 |
| 6 | St. Peter's O.C. B | 18 | 9 | 9 | 0 | 1262 | 1044 | 18 |
| 7 | Exeter B | 18 | 8 | 10 | 0 | 976 | 1030 | 16 |
| 8 | North Brighton/Somerton | 18 | 5 | 13 | 0 | 857 | 1580 | 10 |
| 9 | Payneham B | 18 | 1 | 17 | 0 | 567 | 1858 | 2 |
| 10 | Flinders Park B | 18 | 1 | 17 | 0 | 668 | 2381 | 2 |

=== Finals ===
==== Semi Finals ====
| | Semi-finals |
| Saturday, 12 September | Henley 14.9 | def. | Woodville B 6.6 | Largs Oval |
| Saturday, 12 September | Railways' Institute 10.10 | def. | University C 6.12 | Teachers' College Oval |

==== Final ====
Saturday, 19 September | Henley | def. | Railways' Institute | Teachers' College Oval
13.13 | Q1; Q2; Q3; Final | 7.6 | Umpires: F.K. Russell

== A4 ==
=== Ladder ===
| Pos | Team | Pld | W | L | D | PF | PA | Pts |
|---|---|---|---|---|---|---|---|---|
| 1 | Birkenhead Sports | 18 | 17 | 1 | 0 | 1989 | 507 | 34 |
| 2 | Myer | 18 | 13 | 5 | 0 | 1319 | 852 | 26 |
| 3 | Kenilworth | 18 | 11 | 6 | 1 | 1190 | 1105 | 23 |
| 4 | Old Scotch | 18 | 11 | 7 | 0 | 1127 | 1160 | 22 |
| 5 | Henley B | 18 | 9 | 9 | 0 | 1032 | 1012 | 18 |
| 6 | Pulteney O.S. | 18 | 8 | 10 | 0 | 934 | 1189 | 16 |
| 7 | Prince Alfred O.C. B | 18 | 7 | 9 | 1 | 1165 | 1097 | 15 |
| 8 | Long Range Weapons | 18 | 6 | 11 | 1 | 746 | 1170 | 13 |
| 9 | Goodwood B | 18 | 4 | 13 | 1 | 738 | 1280 | 9 |
| 10 | Teachers' College B | 18 | 2 | 16 | 0 | 537 | 1237 | 4 |

=== Finals ===
==== Semi Finals ====
| | Semi-finals |
| Saturday, 5 September | Birkenhead Sports 10.18 | def. | Kenilworth 5.9 | Railways' Oval |
| Saturday, | Myer 16.12 | def. | Scotch O.C. 7.9 | Walkerville Oval |

==== Final ====
C.G. Tideman Shield
Saturday, 12 September | Birkenhead Sports | def. | Myer | Alberton Oval
9.11 | Q1; Q2; Q3; Final | 7.8 | Umpires: R.C. Hartland

== Colts ==
=== Ladder ===
| Pos | Team | Pld | W | L | D | PF | PA | Pts |
|---|---|---|---|---|---|---|---|---|
| 1 | Colonel Light Gardens | 15 | | | | | | 24 |
| 2 | Payneham | 15 | | | | | | 24 |
| 3 | Woodville | 15 | | | | | | 20 |
| 4 | Flinders Park | 15 | | | | | | 12 |
| 5 | Adelaide | 15 | | | | | | 10 |
| 6 | Goodwood | 15 | | | | | | 0 |

=== Finals ===
==== Semi Finals ====
| | Semi-finals |
| Saturday, 22 August (1:00pm) | Colonel Light Gardens 5.6 | def. by | Woodville 5.10 | Woodville Oval |
| Saturday, 22 August (1:00pm) | Payneham 9.12 | def. | Flinders Park 5.2 | Payneham Oval |

==== Final ====
Saturday, 29 August (1:00pm) | Payneham | def. | Woodville | Walkerville Oval
6.9 | Q1; Q2; Q3; Final | 5.9

==== Challenge Final ====
H.V. Millard Cup
Saturday, 5 September (1:00pm) | Colonel Light Gardens | def. by | Payneham | Woodville Oval
0.6 | Q1; Q2; Q3; Final | 7.6

== Representative ==
Players for Carnival and Upper Murray matches:

Don Brebner captain (Walkerville), Don Davies (Prince Alfred O.C.), Brian Dodson (Exeter), Jim Farr (Rosewater), Peter Hill (Prince Alfred O.C.), Martin Kitchener (University), John Laurie (University), John Lawrence (University), Len Lomman (Payneham), Robert Magnusson (Semaphore Central), Jerry Martin (University), Jock McFarlane (St. Peter's O.C.), Tom McInerney (Exeter), Alistair McLeod vice-captain (University), Merv Natt (Exeter), Owen Price (Prince Alfred O.C.), Jim Sawford (Semaphore Central), Kevin Simmons (Semaphore Central), Barry Skinner (Exeter), Graham Smith (Flinders Park), Robert Thorpe (Walkerville), Peter Tunbridge (University), John Walsh (University), Ken Wilkinson (Walkerville), Max Yon (Woodville).

=== vs Upper Murray ===
A match was played against a combined Upper Murray Football League at Barmera Oval on 18th July.

Saturday, 18 July | Upper Murray | def. by | Amateur League | Barmera Oval (crowd: 1,500+)
3.2; 4.3; 9.7; 11.8 (74) | Q1; Q2; Q3; Final | 4.3; 9.10; 13.13; 16.17 (113)
Jolly 2, Harris 2, Giles 2, Ingham, B. Murphy, K. Murphy, Waechter, Westbrook | Goals | Martin 4, Sawford 3, Farr 2, McLeod 2, Tunbridge 2, Walsh 2, McFarlane
Jolly, Harris, Becker, Fluris, K. Murphy | Best | Sawford, Martin, Dodson, Farr, Price, Kitchener

=== Carnival ===
The Fifth Australian Amateur Football Council Carnival was held in Adelaide at University Oval 27th July to 1st August. The Carnival was brought forward a year due to the Australian National Football Council Carnival to be held in 1954. Day 1 teams. Day 2 teams.

==== Day 1 28th July ====
Tuesday, 28 July (12:00pm) | S.A. | def. | Tasmania | University Oval
7.6; 10.8; 19.15; 22.20 (152) | Q1; Q2; Q3; Final | 1.1; 4.3; 4.5; 9.9 (63) | Umpires: W.J. Edgeword
McLeod 5, Tumbridge 4, McFarlane 4, Davies 3, Sawford 3, Martin 2, Walsh | Goals | Burke 3, Martin 3, Cunningham 2, Brown
Skinner, McLeod, Sawford, Davies, McFarlane, Tumbridge | Best | McGuinness, Watson, Martin, Shepherd, Burke, Vincent

Tuesday, 28 July (2:45pm) | WA | def. by | Victoria | University Oval
2.5; 6.7; 7.9; 8.12 (60) | Q1; Q2; Q3; Final | 6.4; 10.8; 17.11; 22.11 (134)
Peter 2, Kershaw 2, Hilton, O'Brien, Mann, Gartrell | Goals | Anderson 8, McLaughlin 4, Wylie 3, Cox 3, Tunbridge, Russel, Harkness, Kenealy
Gartrell, Munns, Caporn, Kershaw, Hilton, Peter | Best | Anderson, Cox, Wylie, Thomas, Trevorrow, Harkness

==== Day 2 30th July ====
Thursday, 30 July (12:00pm) | Victoria | def. | Tasmania | University Oval
4.4; 11.12; 16.18; 21.23 (149) | Q1; Q2; Q3; Final | 1.1; 1.1; 2.3; 3.3 (21)
Anderson 4, Cox 4, Courtney 3, Keneally 3, McLaughlin 2, Tunbridge 2, Trevorrow 2, Trounson | Goals | Martin, Krushks, Grubb
Anderson, Cox, Trounson, Hawes, Bralley, Thomas | Best | Fitch, Findlay, Shepherd, Verrier, Grubbm McGuinness

Thursday, 30 July (2:30pm) | SA | def. | WA | University Oval
2.2; 5.3; 10.7; 14.10 (94) | Q1; Q2; Q3; Final | 2.8; 4.9; 5.9; 8.12 (60)
McLeod 3, Martin 3, McFarlane 2, Walsh 2, Farr, Tunbridge, Lomman, McInerney | Goals | Caporn 3, Peter 2, Miles, Netherway, Gartrell
Wilkinson, Martin, Natt, McLeod, Price, Lomman | Best | Durraat, Pass, Gartrell, Anderson, Caporn, Eborall, Bromley

==== Day 3 1st August ====
Saturday, 1 August (12:00pm) | WA | def. | Tasmania | University Oval
1.2; 5.6; 7.9; 10.12 (72) | Q1; Q2; Q3; Final | 2.2; 3.3; 5.5; 9.8 (62)
Gartel 2, Netherway 2, Caporn 2, Walkerden 2, Kershaw, Peter | Goals | Brown, Garity, Turner
Best | Verrier, Turner

Saturday, 1 August (2:30pm) | SA | def. by | Victoria | University Oval
1.1; 1.1; 2.3; 8.6 (54) | Q1; Q2; Q3; Final | 4.4; 9.8; 12.12; 16.16 (112) | Umpires: L. 'Congie' McLean
Martin 3, Sawford 2, Davies 2, Hill | Goals | Anderson 6, Trevorrow 3, Tunbridge 2, Cox, Russell, Harkness, Kneally, McLaughlin
Sawford, McLeod, Dodson, Martin, Skinner, Wilkinson | Best | Anderson, Cox, Tunbridge, McLaughlan, Wylie, Kneally
