= 1927 SAAFL season =

1927 premiership season
- Date: 25 April - 1 October
- Teams: 10
- Premiers: Kenilworth
- Runners-up: University
- Minor premiers: University
- Wooden spooners: Y.M.C.A.
- Best and fairest: Bert Mitchell (Teachers' College)
- Leading goalkicker: W. R. James (University) 124 Goals

The 1927 SAAFL season was the 13th season of the South Australian Amateur Football League (SAAFL).

Professor H. Darnley Naylor, who held the position of President of the SAAFL since its inception in 1911, departed for England and was succeeded by Dr. F.S. Hone. The Naylor Medal for the best and fairest in the SAAFL (as voted by the umpires) was replaced by the Hone Medal.

New clubs were admitted for this season. The first being Henley & Grange being re-admitted after the West Torrens District Association folded. The second being South Adelaide Ramblers, who joined after having won the previous years Y.M.C.A. Association Premiership.

== Minor Rounds ==
=== Round 1 ===
	Round 1
25 April	Marryatville	v	Kenilworth	Norwood Oval
25 April	Kingswood	v	Teachers College	Jubilee Oval

=== Round 2 ===
	Round 2
30 April	Kenilworth	v	S.A. Ramblers	South Park
30 April	University	v	Kingswood	University Oval
30 April	Marryatville	v	Teachers' College	Victoria Park
30 April	Henley and Grange	v	Semaphore Central	Grange Oval
30 April	Y.M.C.A.	v	Prince Alfred Old Collegians	North Park

== Ladder ==
Pos	Team	Pld	W	L	D	Pts
1	University	18	16	2	0	32
2	Semaphore Central	18	14	4	0	28
3	South Adelaide Ramblers	18	14	4	0	28
4	Kenilworth	18	13	5	0	26
5	Kingswood	18	12	6	0	24
6	Teachers Training College	18	7	11	0	14
7	Prince Alfred Old Collegians	18	6	12	0	12
8	Henley and Grange	18	6	12	0	12
9	Marryatville	18	1	17	0	2
10	Y.M.C.A.	18	1	17	0	2

== Finals ==
=== Semi Finals ===
	Semi Finals
Saturday, 17 September	University 16.11	def.	South Adelaide Ramblers 9.15	Prospect Oval
Saturday, 17 September	Semaphore Central 11.10	def. by	Kenilworth 12.8	University Oval

=== Final ===
	Final
Saturday, 24 September	University 9.6	def. by	Kenilworth 9.16	Prospect Oval

=== Challenge Final ===
	Challenge Final
1 October	University 10.9	def. by	Kenilworth 10.18	Main Oval, National Park, Belair

== Representative ==
=== vs Metropolitan Amateur Football Association ===
SAAFL
B:
HB:
C:
HF:
F:
Foll:

Monday, 6 June	M.A.F.A	def.	S.A.A.F.L	Albert Cricket Ground (crowd: 2000)	,
1.3; 8.6; 10.9; 13.17	Q1; Q2; Q3; Final	2.2; 6.5; 10.9; 11.11
Rutherford 4, Oakley 3, Staley 2, Hole 2, Barnett 2	Goals	Geue 4, Manuel 2, King, Amies, Tully, Wilkie, Sawyer
