= 1913 SAAFL season =

1913 premiership season
- Date: 3 May - 27 September
- Teams: 9
- Premiers: Kingswood; 1st premiership
- Runners-up: Semaphore Central
- Minor premiers: Semaphore Central; 1st minor premiership

The 1913 SAAFL season was the 3rd season of the South Australian Amateur Football League (SAAFL).

The season commenced on 3 May and concluded on 27 September.

The League Received applications from Albert Park, Alberton Baptist, Kenilworth, Kingswood, Prince Alfred College and Stanley Street. Kingswood and Prince Alfred College were accepted as the SAAFL decided to take no more than two new clubs, this increased the League from 7 to 9 teams.

Matches were played at University Oval, Prince Alfred College, St. Peters College, Jubilee Oval and in the south parklands opposite the Parkside Hotel. New Ovals to be added for this season are Price Oval, Kingswood's ground on Park Terrace (now Greenhill Road) opposite Methodist Ladies College (now Annesley Junior School) and an oval on the corner of South Terrace and Pulteney Street.

== Ladder ==
Pos	Team	Pld	W	L	Pts
1	Semaphore Central	16	14	2	28
2	Kingswood	16	13	3	26
3	University	16	13	3	26
4	Marlborough	16	10	6	20
5	Prince Alfred College	16	7	9	14
6	St. Bartholomew	16	6	10	12
7	St. Francis Xavier	16	5	11	10
8	St. Peters College	16	4	12	8
9	Glenferrie	16	0	16	0

== Finals ==
=== Semi Finals ===
	Semi-finals
Saturday, 13 September	Semaphore Central 7.4 (46)	def. by	University 7.9 (51)	University Oval
Saturday, 13 September	Kingswood	def.	Marlborough	Price Oval

=== Final ===
	Final
Saturday, 20 September	Kingswood 7.13 (55)	def.	University 4.7 (31)	Unley Oval

=== Challenge Final ===
Challenge Final
Saturday, 27 September	Semaphore Central	def. by	Kingswood
4.6 (30)	Q1; Q2; Q3; Final	5.8 (38)

== Representative ==
On Monday, 23rd June a combined team defeated the Gawler Association 10.13 (73) to 5.7 (37). SAAFL Goalkickers: Fraser (St.Barts) 5, Rayner (PAC) 4 and Matters (Kingswood) 1. Best Players: Rayner, Mengersen (PAC), J.W. Blacket (Uni), A.H. Limb (Uni), Dreyer (PAC), Daw (Kingswood), Matters and Fraser.
