= 1925 SAAFL season =

Australian rules football historic season

1925 premiership season
- Teams: 7
- Premiers: Semaphore Central
- Runners-up: Kenilworth
- Minor premiers: Semaphore Central
- Wooden spooners: Goodwood
- Best and fairest: W. McRae (Y.M.C.A.)
- Leading goalkicker: Michael Hanna (Kenilworth) 52 goals

The 1925 SAAFL season was the 11th season of the South Australian Amateur Football League (SAAFL) under Australian rules football.

An application from Croyden to join the League had been rejected as there were already eight clubs. However Dulwich withdrew before the season commenced as only seven teams competed.

The last minor round game had seen Semaphore Central's first loss in three seasons, since the final of 1922 where they lost to University.

== Ladder ==
| Pos | Team | Pld | W | L | D | Pts |
|---|---|---|---|---|---|---|
| 1 | Semaphore Central | 12 | 11 | 1 | 0 | 22 |
| 2 | Kenilworth | 12 | 10 | 2 | 0 | 20 |
| 3 | University | 12 | 8 | 4 | 0 | 16 |
| 4 | Kingswood | 12 | 7 | 5 | 0 | 14 |
| 5 | Teachers Training College | 11 | 2 | 9 | 0 | 4 |
| 6 | Y.M.C.A | 12 | 2 | 10 | 0 | 4 |
| 7 | Goodwood | 11 | 1 | 10 | 0 | 2 |

== Finals ==
=== Semi Finals ===
| | Semi-finals |
| Saturday, 5 September | Semaphore Central 11.11 | def. | University 9.10 | Prospect Oval |
| Saturday, 5 September | Kenilworth 12.19 | def. | Kingswood 7.7 | Y.M.C.A. Ground, North Park, Frome Road |

=== Final ===
| | Final |
| Saturday 12 September | Semaphore Central 5.13 | def. by | Kenilworth 10.14 | Norwood Oval |
Umpire: S.A.D. Hill

=== Challenge Final ===
| | Challenge Final |
| Saturday, 19 September | Semaphore Central 9.16 | def. | Kenilworth 736 | Norwood Oval |

== Representative ==
The first interstate match against Victoria. This match was played against the Metropolitan Amateur Football Association, played on the King's Birthday on Monday 8th June at the Melbourne Cricket Ground. The guernsey colours were chocolate and blue for S.A. (which was borrowed from Kingswood) and dark blue with a white 'V' for Victoria.

The teams were only allowed eighteen players without replacement.

SAAFL
| B: | Norm Gunning (University) | Jack Stacey (Kingswood) | Arthur Oliver (Goodwood) |
| HB: | Len Mayfield (Kingswood) | Bert Donnell (v.c.) (Semaphore Central) | Laurie Walsh (University) |
| C: | Roy Griffiths (Kenilworth) | Jack Jay (cap) (Kingswood) | Jack Wadham (Kenilworth) |
| HF: | Dennis Fitzgerald (Semaphore Central) | Jack Koerner (Kingswood) | Alex Robertson (Semaphore Central) |
| F: | Charlie Keam (Kenilworth) | Arthur Cowell (Semaphore Central) | |
| Foll: | Tom Cornelius (Y.M.C.A.) | Harry Krome (Kenilworth) | Sam Gotts (Goodwood) |
| Foll: | Corie Treloar (Kenilworth | | |
| Res: | Cliff Grundel (Semaphore Central) | Jock McGregor (Kingswood) | Bill Phillips (Kenilworth) |
| Coach: | Hugh Millard | | |

Monday, 8 June | Metropolitan Amateur Football Association | def. | South Australian Amateur Football League | Melbourne Cricket Ground (crowd: 26000)
5.11; 10.14; 12.18; 21.22 (148) | Q1; Q2; Q3; Final | 2.1; 5.4; 7.8; 8.10 (58)
Goals | Cowell 3, Robertson 2, Gotts, Griffiths, Treloar
Best | Fitzgerald, Gotts, Treloar, Gunning, Stacey, Oliver
