= 1955 SAAFL season =

1955 premiership season
- Premiers: A1: University; A2: Payneham; A3: Semaphore Park; A4: Pulteney O.S. Colts: Woodville
- Minor premiers: A1: University; A2: Payneham; A3: Semaphore Park; A4: Pulteney O.S. Colts: Woodville
- Wooden spooners: A1: Flinders Park; A2: Railway's Institute; A3: Old Scotch; A4: Prince Alfred O.C. B Colts: Walkerville
- Best and fairest: A1 (Hone Medal): Leon Gregory (St. Peter's O.C.); A2 (Chambers Medal): Don Looker (Payneham); A3 (McKay Medal): Jim Farr (Semaphore Park); A4 (Treloar Medal): Desmond Whitford (Long Range Weapons); Colts (Nazer Medal): Bob Farnham (Payneham) and Barry Gebler (Goodwood); War Memorial Medal: Geoff Krieger (University)
- Leading goalkicker: A1: Charlie Akkermans (University) 80 goals

The 1955 SAAFL season was the 37th season of the South Australian Amateur Football League (SAAFL).

Grange was admitted under its own name after having been involved in the 1920s and 30s under the Henley and Grange banner. University entered a fourth team, and B teams from Semaphore Park and Walkerville were also admitted. The A3 and A4 grades were increased to 12 teams each. Alberton Church United changed its name to Alberton United.

== A1 ==
=== Ladder ===
Pos	Team	Pld	W	L	D	PF	PA	Pts
1	University	18	17	1	0			34
2	Semaphore Central	18	14	4	0			28
3	Walkerville	18	12	6	0			24
4	Exeter	18	11	7	0			22
5	Woodville	18	9	9	0			18
6	Rosewater	18	8	10	0			16
7	St. Peter's O.C.	18	7	11	0			14
8	Henley	18	5	13	0			10
9	Kenilworth	18	5	13	0			10
10	Flinders Park	18	2	16	0			4

=== Finals ===
==== Semi Finals ====
	Semi-finals
Saturday,	University 17.14	def.	Walkerville 8.9
Saturday,	Semaphore Central 9.7	def. by	Exeter 12.14

==== Final ====
Saturday,	University	def. by	Exeter	Alberton Oval
12.9	Q1; Q2; Q3; Final	15.8

==== Challenge Final ====
Saturday,	University	def.	Exeter
18.5	Q1; Q2; Q3; Final	7.7

== A2 ==
=== Ladder ===
Pos	Team	Pld	W	L	D	PF	PA	Pts
1	Payneham	18	15	3	0			30
2	Riverside	18	15	3	0			30
3	Colonel Light Gardens	18	14	4	0			28
4	Goodwood	18	12	6	0			24
5	Teachers' College	18	9	9	0			18
6	Prince Alfred O.C.	18	8	10	0			16
7	University B	18	6	12	0			12
8	Alberton United	18	6	12	0			12
9	King's O.C.	18	3	15	0			6
10	Railways' Institute	18	1	17	0			2

=== Finals ===
==== Semi Finals ====
	Semi-finals
Saturday,	Payneham 16.9	def.	Colonel Light Gardens 10.12
Saturday,	Riverside 13.3	def. by	Goodwood 13.12

==== Final ====
Saturday,	Payneham	def.	Goodwood	King's College Oval
13.16	Q1; Q2; Q3; Final	6.11

== A3 ==
=== Ladder ===
Pos	Team	Pld	W	L	D	PF	PA	Pts
1	Semaphore Park	20	17	3	0			34
2	University C	20	17	3	0			34
3	Grange	20	16	4	0			32
4	Commonwealth Bank	20	16	4	0			32
5	Birkenhead Sports	20	11	9	0			22
6	Myer	20	11	9	0			22
7	Exeter B	20	10	10	0			20
8	Payneham B	20	8	12	0			16
9	Woodville B	20	6	14	0			12
10	St. Peter's O.C. B	20	4	16	0			8
11	Henley B	20	2	17	1			5
12	Old Scotch	20	1	18	1			3

=== Finals ===
==== Semi Finals ====
	Semi-finals
Saturday,	Semaphore Park 17.15	def.	Grange 15.12
Saturday,	University C 9.9	def. by	Commonwealth Bank 9.15

==== Final ====
Saturday,	Semaphore Park	def.	Commonwealth Bank	Payneham Oval
12.10	Q1; Q2; Q3; Final	11.14

== A4 ==
=== Ladder ===
Pos	Team	Pld	W	L	D	PF	PA	Pts
1	Pulteney O.S.							36
2	Semaphore Central B							36
3	Long Range Weapons							32
4	Kenilworth B							28
5	Rosewater B							24
6	Walkerville B							22
7	Teachers' College B							20
8	University D							14
9	Semaphore Park B							10
10	Goodwood B							8
11	Colonel Light Gardens B							6
12	Prince Alfred O.C. B							4

=== Finals ===
==== Semi Finals ====
	Semi-finals
Saturday,	Pulteney O.S. 13.7	def. by	Long Range Weapons 13.12
Saturday,	Semaphore Central B 19.19	def.	Kenilworth B 9.11

==== Final ====
Saturday,	Semaphore Central B	def. by	Long Range Weapons	{{{venue}}}
7.13	Q1; Q2; Q3; Final	8.12

==== Challenge Final ====
Saturday,	Pulteney O.S.	def.	Long Range Weapons	Walkerville Oval
8.11	Q1; Q2; Q3; Final	7.6

== Colts ==
=== Ladder ===
Pos	Team	Pld	W	L	D	PF	PA	Pts
1	Woodville	15	15	0	0			30
2	Payneham	15						21
3	Flinders Park	15						16
4	Henley	15						10
5	Goodwood	15						9
6	Walkerville	15						4

=== Finals ===
==== Semi Finals ====
	Semi-finals
Saturday,	Woodville 9.14	def.	Flinders Park 2.7
Saturday,	Payneham 2.6	def.	Henley 1.5

==== Final ====
Saturday,	Woodville	def.	Payneham	Walkerville Oval
8.12	Q1; Q2; Q3; Final	3.5

==== Challenge Final ====
Saturday,

v
Q1; Q2; Q3; Final

{{{venue}}}

== Representative ==
=== vs VAFA ===
Queen's Birthday
Monday, 13 June	S.A.A.F.L.	def.	V.A.F.A.	Alberton Oval
2.0; 5.3; 9.7; 13.7 (85)	Q1; Q2; Q3; Final	5.3; 7.4; 8.6; 12.10 (82)	Umpires: Fred Russell
Krieger 4, Ardill 3, Gross 2, Irvine 2, Fletcher, Johnson	Goals
Clarke, Krieger, Ardill, Natt, Simmons, Powell	Best
