= 1939 SAAFL season =

1939 premiership season
- Date: 22 April - 23 September
- Premiers: A1: Exeter; A2: Kenilworth
- Minor premiers: A1: Payneham; A2: Kenilworth
- Wooden spooners: A1: Prince Alfred O.C. A2: University B
- Best and fairest: A1 (Hone Medal): George Matson (Underdale); A2 (Chambers Medal): Grant Jarret (Old Scotch)
- Leading goalkicker: A1: Alec Kinlough (Exeter) 118 goals A2:

The 1939 SAAFL season was the 25th season of the South Australian Amateur Football League (SAAFL).

The season commenced on 22 April and concluded on 23 September.

Applications for affiliation were received from Grange and Kilburn. The League decided not to accept any new clubs.

The Australian Amateur Football Council rejected the new holding-the-ball rule that the SANFL and VFL had introduced., however the Amateurs had approved the new throw-in law where the boundary umpire is to throw the ball in if the ball has gone out of bounds.

In Round 1, Payneham lost for the first time in 72 games, against Semaphore Central. Payneham then had in Round 2, after having defeated University, their points taken away because one of their players was a professional runner; then in round 4 after defeating Exeter, Payneham had their points taken away again for playing a professional cyclist. Payneham were also fined 5/ for each game that the two men played during the previous and current season. They both played an aggregate of 27 game, so Payneham was fined £ 6 15.

King's Old Collegians and Pulteney Old Scholars had their 27 May match moved to 12 June to be played at Victor Harbor.

On 7 June 1939, six players and a club official were sent to the tribunal for incidents that happened in the Semaphore Central v Railways Institute game on 3 June. The charges included: W. Donnon (Semaphore Central) for allegedly using abusive language to Field Umpire Oehme and being sent off in the last quarter; J. Johnson and T. Glaister (Semaphore Central) for allegedly hacking opponents; J. Heaton (Semaphore Central) for allegedly striking an opponent (reported by Railways secretary); R. Marten (Semaphore Central Secretary) for allegedly stricking a Railways Institute player during the last quarter; W. Hudson, M. Venning and J. McLoughlin (Railways Institute) for allegedly kicking opponents (reported by Semaphore's secretary). Donnon was suspended for two matches and Glaister was suspended for one match. The charge against Johnson was dismissed. The charge against Marten was adjourned for the following week (14 June). The reports by the secretaries of both clubs were referred to the League for direction whether club officials were empowered to report. Semaphore Central were disqualified on the 23rd August by the League's tribunal for the remainder of the season after having played 17 out of 18 rounds. The umpire J.J. Quinn, laid a charge of unseemly conduct by the Semaphore Central team and its supporters in the match against University University Oval. The former secretary of Semaphore Central, Mr. Roy Marten, said that the Umpire Mr. Quinn, who is a life member of Semaphore Central, returned his life membership certificate and medallion. The tribunal members were Messrs, S.H. Lewis, J.M. Jay and R.D. King. Semaphore Central appealed this decision, and the executive committee met on Tuesday 29 August. The appeal was dismissed at the meeting of the Amateur League delegates on 29 August, the disqualification only applies for the remainder of the current season, the secretary of the Amateur League (Mr. H.V. Millard) stated that "Semaphore Central would not necessarily have to reapply formally for admission into the Amateur League next year."

== A1 ==
Walkerville, Prince Alfred Old Collegians, St. Peter's Old Collegians, Colonel Light Gardens, Exeter, University, Semaphore Central, Payneham, Underdale, Railways Institute.

=== Ladder ===
Pos	Team	Pld	W	L	D	PF	PA	Pts
1	Payneham	18	13	5	0	1766	1185	26
2	Exeter	18	13	5	0	1922	1388	26
3	S.A. Railways Institute	18	11	7	0	1463	1326	22
4	Colonel Light Gardens	18	8	10	0	1390	1491	16
5	Underdale	18	7	11	0	1476	1819	14
6	St. Peter's O.C.	18	6	12	0	1501	1644	12
7	University	18	6	12	0	1585	1778	12
8	Walkerville	18	6	12	0	1606	1837	12
9	Prince Alfred Old Collegians	18	5	13	0	1271	2217	10
Disqualified	Semaphore Central	17	13	4	0	1800	1196	26

=== Finals ===
==== Semi Finals ====
	Semi-finals
Saturday, 9 September	Payneham 16.11 (107)	def.	Railways' Institute 6.12 (48)	Norwood Oval
Saturday, 9 September	Exeter 7.11 (53)	def.	Colonel Light Gardens 6.5 (41)	Alberton Oval

==== Final ====
Saturday, 16 September	Payneham	def. by	Exeter	Prospect Oval
5.3 (33); 8.4 (52); 12.7 (79); 14.12 (96)	Q1; Q2; Q3; Final	7.2 (44); 9.7 (61); 11.12 (78); 15.20 (110)	Umpires: J.J. Quinn boundary: F.J. Monten and R. Piper goal: S.B. Gitsham and L.S. Driscoll
Loader 7, Ware 2, Palmer 2, Le Cornu 2, Schulze	Goals	Doyle 4, Rose 3, Vincent 3, Kinlough 2, Schedlick, Nelson, Talbot
Palmer, Lawrence, Beames, Schilze, Wilton, Loader	Best	Doyle, Rose, Kay, Anderson, Vincent, Nelson, Sangster
L. Long (Striking)	Reports

L. Long (Payneham) was suspended for three matches.

==== Challenge Final ====
Saturday, 23 September	Payneham	def. by	Exeter	Prospect Oval
8.0 (48); 8.3 (51); 14.8 (92); 15.9 (99)	Q1; Q2; Q3; Final	2.3 (15); 7.7 (49); 10.7 (67); 15.11 (101)	Umpires: J.J. Quinn boundary: F.G.H. Davis, S.H. Orhme, E.C. Gyss, L.R. Cooper goal: G.P. Wilson, L.H. Hooper
Loader 8, Le Cornu 3, Ware 2, Holland 2	Goals	Kinlough 9, Doyle 5, Shedlick
Palmer, Loader, Le Cornu, Lawrence, Titus, Whitaker, Ware	Best	Doyle, Kinlough, Reinberg, Sangster, Vincent, Kellaway, Swanson

== A2 ==
Christian Brothers Old Collegians, Alberton Church United, University B, Banks, Kenilworth, King's Old Collegians, Pulteney Old Scholars, Old Scotch, Teachers' College, Y.M.C.A.

=== Ladder ===
Pos	Team	Pld	W	L	D	PF	PA	Pts
1	Kenilworth	18	16	2	0	1888	1149	32
2	Alberton Church United	18	13	5	0	1841	1281	26
3	Teachers College	18	11	7	0	1696	1448	22
4	Pulteney O.S.	18	11	7	0	1723	1481	22
5	Kings Old Collegians	18	10	8	0	1702	1494	20
6	Y.M.C.A	18	9	9	0	1599	1543	18
7	Scotch Old Collegians	18	9	9	0	1275	1430	18
8	Christian Brothers Old Collegians	18	6	12	0	1322	1727	12
9	Combined Banks	18	4	14	0	1181	1760	8
10	University B	18	1	17	0	976	1906	2

=== Finals ===
==== Semi Finals ====
	Semi-finals
Saturday, 2 September	Kenilworth 6.10	def. by	Teachers' College 7.7	Mortlock Oval
Saturday, 2 September	Alberton Church United 12.13	def.	Pulteney Old Scholars 10.7	Kenilworth Ground

==== Final ====
Saturday, 9 September	Alberton Church United	def. by	Teachers' College	Prospect Oval
10.4 (64)	Q1; Q2; Q3; Final	14.15	Umpires: S.H. Oehme Boundary: F.J. Monten and R. Cunningham
Woollard 3, Johannsen 2, Utting 2, Bailey 2, Mildrum	Goals	Smith 3, Hassold 3, O'Neill 3, Geue 2, Roberts 2, Daly
Simpson, Johannsen, O'Loughlin, Jonas, Hind, Gill	Best	Dawes, Roberts, Bennett, O'Neill, Smith, Rofe, Geue

==== Challenge Final ====
Saturday, 16 September	Kenilworth	def.	Teachers' College	Norwood Oval
3.4 (22); 9.6 (60); 10.6 (66); 15.13 (103)	Q1; Q2; Q3; Final	6.3 (39); 7.4 (46); 10.13 (73); 12.16 (88)	Umpires: F.G.H. Davis boundary: R Cunningham and K Gower goal: G.P. Wilson and I.H. Hooper
Wicks 6, Walker 3, Porter 2, Harper, Williams, Scott, Hall	Goals	Hassold 4, Mansell 2, Smith 2, O'Neill, Geue, Roberts, East
Wicks, Scott, C.H. Lewis, Whitrow, Kinnealy, Williams, Harris	Best	Bennett, Dawes, Rofe, Smith, Hassold, Alcock, Roberts, Sugg

== Representative ==
VAFA

29th July Norwood Oval

SAAFL
VAFA

SAAFL
B:	W. Hudson (Railways' Institute)	A.J. Inglis (Semaphore Central)	J. Bertram (St. Peter's O.C.) capt.
HB:	W. Powell (Exeter)	L. McLean (Semaphore Central)	J. Hogan (Christian Brothers O.C.)
C:	P. Le Messurier (St. Peter's O.C.)	A. Palmer (Payneham)	L. Mills (Prince Alfred O.C.)
HF:	N. Ligertwood (University)	A. Boucaut (St. Peter's O.C.)	M. Narroway (Pulteney O.S.)
F:	R. Hand (Prince Alfred O.C.)	A. Dawkins (Prince Alfred O.C.)	B. Dillon (Walkerville)
Foll:	C. Adcock (King's O.C.)	G. Jarrett (Scotch O.C.)	B. Ware (Payneham)
Res:	C.H. Anderson (Exeter)	H.D. Vincent (Exeter)	
Coach:	Syd Ackland		

VAFA
B:	T. Ellis (Ivanhoe)	R. Steele (University Black) capt.	T. Pagel (State Savings Bank)
HB:	M. Tickell (Collegians)	E. Cordner (University Black)	J. Hunt (Teachers' College)
C:	H. Hutchins (Old Scotch Collegians)	L. Johnson (Coburg)	W. Dexter (Geelong)
HF:	R. Quinn (Ormond)	W. Taylor (Collegians) v.c.	F. Pollard (State Savings Bank)
F:	J. Atkins (Old Melbournians)	L. Boyd-Gurmey (Melbourne High School Old Boys)	W. Coghill (Murrambeena)
Foll:	W. Ross (University Black)	G. Waring (Old Brightonians)	R. Moore (Ivanhoe)
Res:	D. McRae (Old Scotch Collegians)	Mitchell	

Saturday, 29 July	S.A.A.F.L.	def. by	V.A.F.A.	Norwood Oval (crowd: est. 2,000)
5.4 (34); 6.5 (41); 7.13 (55); 10.17 (77)	Q1; Q2; Q3; Final	0.2 (2); 9.9 (63); 12.11 (83); 15.16 (106)	Umpires: J.J. Quinn. Boundary: F.G.H. Davis, S.H. Oehme, L.R. Cooper and E.C. Gyss. Goal: G.P. Wilson and S.G. Gibbs
Dawkins 3, Jarrett 2, Ware, Hand, Dillon, Ligertwood, Narroway	Goals	Pollard 2, Quinn 2, Atkins 2, Ross 2, Coghill 2, Waring 2, Taylor, Boyd-Gurney, Mitchell
Dillon, Inglis, Jarrett, Bertram, Adcock, Le Messurier, Powell	Best	Cordner, Ross, Hunt, Tickell, Moore, Quinn, Waring
Whittaker (Ill) replaced in the starting team by Le Messuries Hogan (Leg) replaced by Anderson	Injuries	Ellis (Knee) replaced by McRae in second quarter Johnson (Broken Finger) replaced by Mitchell at three quarter time
