= 1932 SAAFL season =

Sport History Book sourced

1932 premiership season
- Date: 30 April - 10 September
- Premiers: A1: University; A2: Colonel Light Gardens; Junior League: Semaphore Central Juniors
- Minor premiers: A1: University; A2: Colonel Light Gardens; Junior League: Semaphore Central Juniors
- Wooden spooners: A1: Teachers' Training College; A2: University B Junior League: Prince Alfred O.C. B
- Best and fairest: A1 (Hone Medal): William Curtis (Alberton Church United), Gordon Day (Teachers' Training College); A2: Mervyn Evans (Prince Alfred O.C.)
- Leading goalkicker: A1: Mick Spain (Underdale) 54 goals A2: Les Fillmore (Colonel Light Gardens) 118 goals Junior League: Wallace (Semaphore Central B), Ellis (Colonel Light Gardens) 92 goals

The 1932 SAAFL season was the 18th season of the South Australian Amateur Football League (SAAFL).

The season commenced on 30 April and concluded on 10 September.

The SAAFL had 645 players registered for 26 teams from 19 clubs. Mount Barker, after two seasons, left the league for the Hills Football Association, Its place in A2 was taken by Colonel Light Gardens.

The A2 Grand Finalists from the previous season, Alberton Church United and Goodwood, displaced St. Augustine and Henley & Grange in A1, so both divisions remained at 8 teams each. Three new clubs were Kings Old Collegians (played at Kings College Oval), Otiose (former in Y.M.C.A. Association, played at corner of South and West Terrace), and Semaphore Central Juniors (separate from Semaphore Central, although sharing Largs Reserve, previous played in the Port Adelaide District Association. In 1933, would revert to its original name Exeter). These new clubs were admitted to the Junior League, along with Alberton Church United B and Prince Alfred Old Collegians B. Medals

== A1 ==
=== Ladder ===
Pos	Team	Pld	W	L	D	PF	PA	Pts
1	University	14	14	0	0	1820	852	28
2	Underdale United	14	10	4	0	1158	993	20
3	Semaphore Central	14	9	5	0	1033	940	18
4	Alberton Church United	14	8	6	0	1044	777	16
5	Goodwood	14	6	8	0	822	1015	12
6	Saint Peters Old Collegians	14	4	10	0	1132	1216	8
7	Kenilworth	14	3	11	0	906	1272	6
8	Teachers Training College	14	2	12	0	887	1537	4

=== Finals ===
==== Semi Finals ====
	Semi-finals
Saturday, 20 August	University 15.12	def.	Semaphore Central 7.17	Jubilee Oval
Saturday, 20 August	Underdale 8.11	def.	Alberton Church United 7.12	North Park

==== Final ====
Final
Saturday, 27 August	University	def.	Underdale	Jubilee Oval
3.4; 7.5; 9.7; 14.11	Q1; Q2; Q3; Final	3.4; 6.7; 8.9; 11.13	Umpires: D. Busbridge; BOG: Seppelt
James 4, Gillespie 3, Seppelt 2, Brown 2, Funder 2, Maitland	Goals	Spain 4, Sheridan 2, Kearns 2, Parry, Dodd, Conroy
Seppelt, Gillespie, Thompson, Baudlnet, James, Brown	Best	Spain, Parry, Conroy, Burnett, Eusom, Baird

== A2 ==
=== Ladder ===
Pos	Team	Pld	W	L	D	PF	PA	Pts
1	Colonel Light Gardens	14	14	0	0	1763	644	28
2	St. Augustine	14	10	4	0	1151	1111	20
3	Henley and Grange	14	9	5	0	925	891	18
4	Prince Alfred Old Collegians	14	8	6	0	1099	904	16
5	Scotch Old Collegians	14	5	9	0	929	1050	10
6	Y.M.C.A.	14	5	9	0	866	1043	10
7	Kingswood	14	5	9	0	884	1137	10
8	University B	14	0	14	0	629	1466	0

=== Finals ===
==== Semi Finals ====
	Semi-finals
Saturday, 20 August	Colonel Light Gardens 18.18	def.	Henley and Grange 6.8	West Park
Saturday, 20 August	St. Augustine	v	Prince Alfred O.C.	Prince Alfred College Oval
Saturday, 27 August	St. Augustine 14.9	def.	Prince Alfred O.C. 10.9	University Oval
Prince Alfred O.C. protested the result of its Semi Final, so the match was replayed, but they still lost

==== Final ====
Final
Saturday, 3 September	Colonel Light Gardens	def.	St. Augustine	University Oval
12.12	Q1; Q2; Q3; Final	11.13	Umpires: D. Busbridge
L. Fillmore 6, Headon 3, Winter 2, Binns	Goals	Mayfied 3, Margitich 3, Uren 2, Giffen, Hall, McDougall
Headon, Purdie, Cocks	Best	D. Tuohy, Doig, Wiese

== Junior League ==
King's College Old Collegians, Otiose, Alberton Church United B, Semaphore Central Juniors, Prince Alfred Old Collegians B, Colonel Light Gardens B, Kenilworth B, Goodwood B, St. Peter's Old Collegians B, S.A. Railways' Institute. Alberton Church United B dropped out after round 5.

Pos	Team	Pld	W	L	D	PF	PA	Pts
1	Semaphore Central Juniors	16	15	1	0	1820	412	30
2	Colonel Light Gardens B	16	13	3	0	1510	702	26
3	Kings Old Collegians	16	12	4	0	1189	665	24
4	Kenilworth B	16	9	6	1	991	853	19
5	Goodwood B	16	9	7	0	1079	906	18
6	S.A. Railways Institute	16	7	8	1	811	1234	15
7	Otiose	16	4	12	0	960	1032	8
8	St. Peters Old Collegians B	16	1	15	0	294	1358	2
9	Prince Alfred Old Collegians B	16	1	15	0	381	1834	2
10	Alberton Church United B	5	0	5	0			0

=== Finals ===
==== Semi Finals ====
	Semi-finals
Saturday, 3 September	Semaphore Central Juniors 6.22	def.	Kings O.C. 5.5	Underdale ground
Saturday, 3 September	Colonel Light Gardens B 7.15	def. by	Kenilworth B 10.9	Goodwood Recreation Ground

==== Final ====
Final
Saturday, 10 September	Semaphore Central Juniors	def.	Kenilworth	Y.M.C.A. Ground, North Park
13.14	Q1; Q2; Q3; Final	7.15	Umpires: J.W. Smith
Wallace 5, Beer 2, Quinn, Hayes, Baker, Marriott, Halliday	Goals	Ryan 8, L. Bran, D. Wylle
Best	P. Hancock, Ryan, Fahlbusch

== Representative ==
=== vs Metropolitan Amateur Football Association ===
SAAFL
B:	
HB:	
C:	
HF:	
F:	
Foll:	
Coach:	Hugh Millard

Friday, 3 June (2:45pm)	S.A.A.F.L	def.	M.A.F.A.	Norwood Oval
3.3; 6.5; 7.10; 10.17 (77)	Q1; Q2; Q3; Final	1.1; 5.5; 6.10; 10.12 (72)
L. Fillmore 4, Gillespie 3, McGorm, Scarman, Toms	Goals
Bridgland, McLeod, Seppelt, Toms, Reval, McGorm, Brunt, Day	Best

=== vs Combined Universities (Adelaide and Melbourne) ===
SAAFL
B:	Tunbridge (v.c.)	Nettle	Bridgland (capt.)
HB:	Truscott	Burnett	Tuohy
C:	Milne	D. Fillmore	Evans
HF:	Conroy	Bentley	Heirfield
F:	Niemann	L. Fillmore	Parsons
Foll:	Jacks	McGorm	Doig

Combined Universities
B:	Bell	McAuliffe	Muecke
HB:	Burnard	MacFarlan	Clarkson
C:	Jens	Ryan	Catchlove
HF:	Gillespie	McGregor	Peters
F:	Funder	McMichael	Brown
Foll:	Seppelt	James	Abbott

Wednesday, 17 August	S.A.A.F.L	def. by	Comb. Universities	St. Peter's College Oval
9.15	Q1; Q2; Q3; Final	17.13
L. Fillmore 2, Conroy 2, Tidswell 2, Bentley, Day, McGorm	Goals
Bridgland, Evans, McGorm, Tidswell, Burnett, Tuohy	Best
