= 1952 SAAFL season =

1952 premiership season
- Date: 19 April - 20 September
- Premiers: A1: University; A2: St. Peter's O.C. A3: Semaphore Central B
- Minor premiers: A1: University; A2: St. Peter's O.C. A3: Commonwealth Bank
- Wooden spooners: A1: Riverside; A2: Payneham B A3: Teachers' College B
- Best and fairest: A1 (Hone Medal): Merv Natt (Exeter) and Stan Hobbs (Alberton Church United); A2 (Chambers Medal): Clarrie Christensen (Rosewater); A3 (McKay Medal): Ian McLoad (Railways' Institute); War Memorial Medal: Don Pike (Teachers' College)
- Leading goalkicker: A1: Alistair McLeod (University) 56 goals

The 1952 SAAFL season was the 34th season of the South Australian Amateur Football League (SAAFL).

The season commenced on 19 April and concluded on 20 September.

A new system of interchange of players with the SA National Football Association (B Grade), where players are now able to play in an Association team and return to the Amateur League during the season.

Four new teams were admitted Commonwealth Bank, Exeter B, North Brighton-Somerton, and Semaphore Central B. An application from Gepps Cross was rejected. This increased the number of teams to 35. It was decided to not create another division, so A1 still had 10 teams, A2 expanded to 12 teams, and A3 to 13 teams.

Following multiple forfeits by 'B' teams in 1951, the procedure for forfeits was formalised with the receiving team being awarded 2 premiership points and a 5-goal to nothing score.

== A1 ==
=== Ladder ===
Pos	Team	Pld	W	L	D	PF	PA	Pts
1	University	18	16	2	0	1815	1077	32
2	Exeter	18	13	5	0	1322	1157	26
3	Alberton Church United	18	12	6	0	1202	1215	24
4	Flinders Park	18	9	9	0	1443	1308	18
5	Semaphore Central	18	9	9	0	1228	1308	18
6	Walkerville	18	8	10	0	1492	1352	16
7	Woodville	18	7	11	0	1055	1118	14
8	Prince Alfred O.C.	18	7	11	0	1121	1280	14
9	Payneham	18	6	12	0	1175	1444	12
10	Riverside	18	3	15	0	1052	1486	6

=== Finals ===
==== Semi Finals ====
	Semi-finals
Saturday, 30 August	University 17.16 (118)	def.	Alberton Church United 6.4 (40)	Payneham Oval
Saturday, 30 August	Exeter 11.14 (80)	def.	Flinders Park 8.8 (56)	Woodville Oval

==== Final ====
George Murray Shield
Saturday, 6 September	University	def. by	Exeter	Alberton Oval
10.16 (76)	Q1; Q2; Q3; Final	14.5 (89)

==== Challenge Final ====
George Murray Shield - Challenge Final
Saturday, 13 September	University	v	Exeter	Thebarton Oval
2.5; 7.7; 8.9; 13.17 (95)	Q1; Q2; Q3; Final	3.2; 6.2; 8.7; 10.7 (67)
McLeod 7, Walsh, Tunbridge, Giles, Duncan, Luxton, Pak Poy	Goals	Blackwell 3, J. Harvey 3, Smyth 2, Lidstone, Evans
Broadbent, Hancock, McLeod, Elix, Laurie, Pak Poy	Best	Hurley, Blackwell, Iles, McInerney, J. Harvey, Reeves

== A2 ==
=== Ladder ===
Pos	Team	Pld	W	L	D	PF	PA	Pts
1	St. Peter's O.C.	20	17	3	0			34
2	Kenilworth	20	15	5	0			30
3	Goodwood	20	15	5	0			30
4	Semaphore Park	20	14	6	0			28
5	University B	20	14	6	0			28
6	Teachers' College	20	11	9	0			22
7	King's O.C.	20	10	10	0			20
8	Rosewater	20	8	11	1			17
9	Colonel Light Gardens	20	7	12	1			15
10	Woodville B	20	5	15	0			10
11	Kelvinator	20	3	17	0			6
12	Payneham B	20	0	20	0			0

=== Finals ===
==== Semi Finals ====
	Semi-finals
Saturday, 6 September	St. Peter's O.C. 9.5 (59)	def. by	Goodwood 8.13 (61)	Payneham Oval
Saturday, 6 September	Kenilworth 12.20 (92)	def.	Semaphore Park 8.7 (55)	Railway Oval

==== Final ====
Saturday, 13 September	Goodwood	def.	Kenilworth	Payneham Oval
10.5 (65)	Q1; Q2; Q3; Final	7.13 (55)

==== Challenge Final ====
Saturday, 20 September	St. Peter's O.C.	def.	Goodwood	Alberton Oval
11.9 (75)	Q1; Q2; Q3; Final	9.14 (68)

== A3 ==
=== Ladder ===
Pos	Team	Pld	W	L	D	PF	PA	Pts
1	Commonwealth Bank	18	17	1	0			34
2	Exeter B	18	15	3	0			30
3	Semaphore Central B	18	14	4	0			28
4	Flinders Park B	18	14	4	0			28
5	Railways' Institute	18	13	5	0			26
6	University C	18	9	8	1			19
7	North Brighton/Somerton	18	7	10	1			15
8	Old Scotch	18	5	12	1			11
9	St. Peter's O.C. B	18	5	12	1			11
10	Goodwood B	18	5	13	0			10
11	Prince Alfred O.C. B	18	5	13	0			10
12	Pulteney O.S.	18	3	14	1			7
13	Teachers' College B	18	2	15	1			5

=== Finals ===
==== Semi Finals ====
	Semi-finals
Saturday, 6 September	Commonwealth Bank 7.9 (51)	def. by	Semaphore Central B 9.11 (65)	Walkerville Oval
Saturday, 6 September (12:45pm)	Exeter B 6.9 (45)	def. by	Flinders Park B 9.2 (56)	Alberton Oval

==== Final ====
Saturday, 13 September	Semaphore Central B	def.	Flinders Park B	Alberton Oval
10.12 (72)	Q1; Q2; Q3; Final	4.8 (32)

==== Challenge Final ====
Saturday, 20 September	Commonwealth Bank	def. by	Semaphore Central B	Payneham Oval
7.15 (57)	Q1; Q2; Q3; Final	11.14 (80)

== Representative ==
=== vs VAFA ===
played at Alberton Oval June 9

SAAFL
B:	B. Bunce (Alberton Church United)	B. Dodson (Exeter)	L. Stevens (Woodville)
HB:	J. Lawrence (University)	K. Seedsman (St. Peter's O.C.)	M. Natt (Exeter)
C:	C. Jarratt (Walkerville)	Elix (University)	K. Cocks (Walkerville)
HF:	P. Tunbridge (University)	A. McLeod (University) capt.	C. Christensen (Rosewater)
F:	J. Farr (Riverside)	F. Gubbins (Walkerville)	T. Schultz (Walkerville)
Foll:	D. Giles (University)	D. Harris (University)	S. Hobbs (Alberton Church United) vice-capt.
Res:	J. Crichton (Semaphore Central)	S. Shannon (Rosewater)	

Queen's Birthday
Monday, 9 June	S.A.A.F.L.	def. by	V.A.F.A.	Alberton Oval
2.3; 3.4; 6.6; 9.9 (63)	Q1; Q2; Q3; Final	2.4; 6.6; 8.11; 9.15 (69)
McLeod 4, Christensen, Farr, Schultz, Gubbins	Goals	Russsel 5, Paton, Clarke, Clover, McLaughlin
M. Natt (BoG for SA), Farr, Tunbridge, Harris, Dodson, McLeod	Best	M. Russel (BoG for Vic), Melville, Birtles, Paton, Brady, McLaughlin
Cocks, Lawrence, Dodson	Injuries
