= 1948 SAAFL season =

1948 premiership season
- Date: 24 April - 11 September
- Premiers: A1: Exeter; A2: Alberton Church United; A3: Goodwood B
- Minor premiers: A1: Exeter; A2: Alberton Church United; A3: Goodwood B
- Wooden spooners: A1: Colonel Light Gardens; A2: Pulteney O.S. A3: King's O.C. B
- Best and fairest: A1 (Hone Medal): H. Simpson (Colonel Light Gardens); A2 (Chambers Medal): C.C. Adcock (King's O.C.); A3 (McKay Medal): Lowe (St. Peter's O.C. B)

The 1948 SAAFL season was the 30th season of the South Australian Amateur Football League (SAAFL).

The season commenced on 24 April and concluded on 11 September.

Included in the newly admitted teams was Postal Institute, which had formed a football club in 1944, had been a member of the Adelaide & Suburban Football Association. Other teams include the B teams of Goodwood, King's O.C., Prince Alfred O.C., St. Peter's O.C., and Teachers' College. This increased the A1 and A2 divisions to 10 teams each and A3 to 8 teams.

The Australian Amateur Football Council was granted representation on the Australian National Football Council. This caused the amateur associations in Victoria, Western Australia, Tasmania and South Australia to play under the national council rules, except the amateur's kept their rule giving the umpire the power to order a player from the field.

The Grades for the season were:

Grade A1 - Exeter, Woodville, Payneham, University, Walkerville, Semaphore Central, Goodwood, Kelvinator, Colonel Light Gardens, Prince Alfred Old Collegians.

Grade A2 - Alberton Church United, St. Peter's Old Collegians, Kenilworth, King's Old Collegians, Christian Brothers' Old Collegians, Railway Institute, Teachers' College, University B, Payneham B, Pulteney Old Scholars.

Grade A3 - Old Scotch, Queen's Old Collegians, Postal Institute, St. Peter's Old Collegians B, Prince Alfred Old Collegians B, King's Old Collegians B, Teachers' College B, Goodwood B.

== A1 ==
=== Ladder ===
Pos	Team	Pld	W	L	D	PF	PA	Pts
1	Exeter	18	16	1	1			33
2	University	18	14	3	1			29
3	Woodville	18	12	4	2			26
4	Semaphore Central	18	12	5	1			25
5	Goodwood	18	8	9	1			17
6	Prince Alfred O.C.	18	8	10	0			16
7	Walkerville	18	7	11	0			14
8	Kelvinator	18	6	12	0			12
9	Payneham	18	3	14	1			7
10	Colonel Light Gardens	18	0	17	1			1

=== Finals ===
==== Semi Finals ====
	Semi-finals
Saturday, 28 August	Exeter 14.19	def.	Woodville 12.6	Goodwood Oval
Saturday, 28 August	University 12.5	def. by	Semaphore Central 12.12	Teachers' College Oval

==== Final ====
Saturday, 3 September	Exeter	def.	Semaphore Central	Woodville Oval
8.10	Q1; Q2; Q3; Final	6.8

== A2 ==
=== Ladder ===
Pos	Team	Pld	W	L	D	PF	PA	Pts
1	Alberton Church United	18	16	2	0			32
2	King's O.C.	18	15	2	1			31
3	Teachers' College	18	15	3	0			30
4	St. Peter's O.C.	18	11	7	0			22
5	S.A. Railways Institute	18	8	9	1			17
6	Kenilworth	18	8	10	0			16
7	University B	18	7	11	0			14
8	Christian Brothers O.C.	18	6	11	1			13
9	Payneham B	18	2	15	1			5
10	Pulteney O.S.	18	0	18	0			0

=== Finals ===
==== Semi Finals ====
	Semi-finals
Saturday, 28 August	Alberton Church United 12.8	def.	Teachers' College 9.15	St. Peter's College
Saturday, 28 August	King's O.C. 9.24	def.	St. Peter's O.C. 8.10	Prince Alfred College

==== Final ====
Saturday, 3 September	Alberton Church United	def. by	King's O.C.	Goodwood Oval
12.15	Q1; Q2; Q3; Final	14.13

==== Challenge Final ====
Saturday, 11 September	Alberton Church United	def.	King's O.C.	Alberton Oval
10.16	Q1; Q2; Q3; Final	8.9

== A3 ==
=== Ladder ===
Pos	Team	Pld	W	L	D	PF	PA	Pts
1	Goodwood B	18	15	3	0			30
2	Old Scotch	18	14	4	0			28
3	Postal Institute	18	13	5	0			26
4	Teachers' College B	18	10	8	0			20
5	St. Peter's O.C. B	18	10	8	0			20
6	Prince Alfred O.C. B	18	5	13	0			10
7	Queen's O.C. B	18	5	13	0			10
8	King's O.C. B	18	0	18	0			0

=== Finals ===
==== Semi Finals ====
	Semi-finals
Saturday, 28 August	Goodwood B 13.9	def.	Postal Institute 7.7	Scotch College
Saturday, 28 August	Old Scotch 19.14	def.	Teachers' College B 7.10

==== Final ====
Saturday, 3 September	Goodwood B	def.	Old Scotch	Teachers' College Oval (Kensington Oval)
16.13	Q1; Q2; Q3; Final	9.6

== Representative ==
Australian Amateur Football Carnival was held in Perth from 7th August to 12th August.

Results of 10th August

Victoria 24.24 def Tasmania 8.4;

SA 21.19 def WA 14.15

Results of Final on 12th August

SA 11.21 def Vic 10.14; WA 16.11 def Tas 12.16
