= 1914 SAAFL season =

1914 premiership season
- Date: 2 May - 19 September
- Teams: 9
- Premiers: Semaphore Central
- Minor premiers: Semaphore Central
- Wooden spooners: St. Bartholomew

The 1914 SAAFL season was the 4th season of the South Australian Amateur Football League (SAAFL).

The 1914 season commenced on 2 May and concluded on 19 September.

Inaugural member Marlborough could not form a team, so it was decided to replace them with Kenilworth, a club from the United Church Association and premiers in 1913.

On 10 October, Semaphore Central played Port Adelaide, the premiers of the S.A.F.L and were defeated 8.4 (52) to 9.17 (71)

== Ladder ==
| Pos | Team | Pld | W | L | D | Pts |
|---|---|---|---|---|---|---|
| 1 | Semaphore Central | 16 | 15 | 1 | 0 | 30 |
| 2 | University | 16 | 14 | 2 | 0 | 28 |
| 3 | Kingswood | 16 | 11 | 5 | 0 | 22 |
| 4 | Kenilworth | 16 | 10 | 6 | 0 | 20 |
| 5 | Glenferrie | 16 | 10 | 6 | 0 | 20 |
| 6 | Prince Alfred College | 16 | 5 | 11 | 0 | 10 |
| 7 | St. Francis Xavier | 16 | 3 | 12 | 1 | 7 |
| 8 | St. Peters College | 16 | 2 | 14 | 0 | 4 |
| 9 | St. Bartholomew | 16 | 1 | 14 | 1 | 3 |

== Finals ==
=== Semi Finals ===
| | Semi-finals |
| Saturday, 12 September | Semaphore Central 7.9 (51) | def. | Kingswood 7.4 (46) | Unley Oval |
| Saturday, 12 September | University 5.13 (43) | def. | Kenilworth 4.16 (40) | Hindmarsh Oval |

=== Grand Final ===
Grand Final
Saturday, 19 September | Semaphore Central | def. | University | Norwood Oval
0.0; 2.5; 2.6; 6.12 (48) | Q1; Q2; Q3; Final | 2.1; 3.2; 4.7; 4.11 (35) | BoG: Channon (Semaphore Central)
