= Southern Football League (South Australia) =

Australian rules football league

- Current season, competition or edition: 2026
- Formerly: Southern Football Association
- Sport: Australian rules football
- Founded: 1886; 140 years ago
- President: Craig Warman
- No. of teams: 10 (13 clubs)
- Country: Australia
- Most recent champion: Flagstaff Hill (2026)

The Southern Football League (SFL) is an Australian rules football league in South Australia. The League was formed, as the Southern Football Association, in 1886. The league is a not-for-profit organisation.

The league is a suburban competition which also acts as a feeder competition for the South Australian National Football League (SANFL) and in turn the Australian Football League (AFL). Some AFL players from the SFL are Adam Cooney, Nathan Eagleton, Ben Rutten, Dean Brogan and Andrew Mackie. SANFL clubs that have recruitment zones linked to the Southern Football League are West Adelaide Football Club, Glenelg Football Club and South Adelaide Football Club.

== League history ==
The Southern Football League was previously known as the Southern Football Association until 1963. Originally a country league, with urban expansion it has more recently become a suburban league in Adelaide's far southern suburbs.

The League was formed (as Southern Football Association) in 1886 with competing clubs being Aldinga, McLaren Vale, Sellicks Hill and Willunga. In the early 1900s the participating clubs were Aldinga, Hillside (called McLaren Flat from 1946), McLaren Vale, Morphett Vale, Noarlunga and Willunga.

In 1919 the participating clubs were Aldinga, Hillside, McLaren Vale, Morphett Vale, Noarlunga, Reynella and Willunga.

In 1964 the association changed its name to Southern Football League and participating clubs were Aldinga, McLaren Flat, McLaren Vale, Morphett Vale, Mount Bold, Myponga, Noarlunga, Port Noarlunga, Reynella, Willunga, Yankalilla and Christies Beach Juniors.

The League came to national attention on 11 July 2009, when an SFL match between Port Noarlunga and Reynella was abandoned as a result of a freak tornado.

The League once again came to attention in 2012 when it cancelled its Junior Carnivals due to umpire abuse and poor spectator behaviour. This led to a campaign based around respect and protection of umpires.

- 2015 was Edwardstown last season in the league, they transferred to the South Australian Amateur Football League.
- 2016 was Morphettville Park and Brighton last season in the league, they transferred to the Adelaide Footy League (Formerly South Australian Amateur Football League).
- 2017 Hackham were in recess. Port Noarlunga got ejected from the finals after playing an ineligible player in the semi-final. Marion and O'Sullivan Beach/Lonsdale last season in the league, they transferred to the Adelaide Footy League.
- 2020 was Hackham last season in the league, they transferred to the Adelaide Footy League.
- 2024 Ironbank Cherry Gardens first season after they transferred from the Hills Football League.
- 2026 Noarlunga did not field an A-Grade side.

== Clubs ==
=== Current ===
Club	Colours	Nickname	Home Ground	Former League	Est.	Years in SFL	SFL Senior Premierships		
Club	Colours	Nickname	Home Ground	Former League	Est.	Years in SFL	Div 1	Div 2	Recent
Aldinga		Sharks	Shark Park (Aldinga Oval), Aldinga	–	1879	1886-1952, 1977-	7	2	1993
Christies Beach		Saints	John Bice Memorial Oval, Christies Beach	–	1964	1966-	7	-	1994
Cove		Cobras	Hallett Cove Oval, Hallett Cove	–	1983	1984-	1	1	2008
Flagstaff Hill		Falcons	Flagstaff Oval, Flagstaff Hill	SMFL	1963	1986-	8	1	2026
Happy Valley		Vikings	Happy Valley Oval, Aberfoyle Park	SMFL	1951	1980-	8	0	2012
Ironbank Cherry Gardens		Thunderers	Thunder Park (Cherry Gardens Ironbank Recreation Ground), Cherry Gardens	HFL	1986	2024-	0	-	-
Morphett Vale		Emus	Morphett Vale Memorial Oval, Morphett Vale	–	1895	1899–1915, 1924, 1928–1929, 1935, 1946–1953, 1963-	9	-	2009
Noarlunga		Shoes	Old Noarlunga Oval, Old Noarlunga	–	1897	1915–1935, 1938, 1951-	10	-	2014
Port Noarlunga		Cockle Divers	Port Noarlunga Oval, Port Noarlunga South	SMFL	1935	1947-	5	-	2025
Reynella		Wineflies	Reynella Oval, Old Reynella	SMFL	1896	1919, 1948-	8	-	2024

=== Women and juniors only ===
Club	Colours	Nickname	Home Ground	Men's Team	Est.	Years in SFL	SFL Senior Premierships		
Club	Colours	Nickname	Home Ground	Men's Team	Est.	Years in SFL	Div 1	Div 2	Recent
Blackwood		Woods	Blackwood Hill Reserve, Blackwood	HFL	1912	2025-	-	-	-
Hackham		Hawks	Hackham Oval, Hackham	AdFL	1976	1977-	0	1	1990
McLaren Districts		Eagles	McLaren Vale Sporting Complex, McLaren Vale	GSFL	1998	1998–2000, 2024-	-	0	-

=== Locations ===
Locations of the Southern FL clubs. Yellow pogs indicate clubs that do not field senior men's sides in the SFL.

=== Former ===
Clubs that have previously competed in the league include:

Club	Colours	Nickname	Home Ground	Former League	Est.	Years in SFL	SFL Senior Premierships			Fate
Club	Colours	Nickname	Home Ground	Former League	Est.	Years in SFL	Div 1	Div 2	Recent	Fate
Brighton		Bombers	Brighton Oval, Brighton	SAAFL	1991	1997–2016	2	-	2011	Moved to Adelaide FL in 2017
Clarendon			Clarendon Oval, Clarendon	MSFA	1905	1934–1935	0	-	-	Moved to Hills Central FA in 1936
Edwardstown		Towns	Edwardstown Oval, Edwardstown	SAAFL	1919	2009–2015	0	-	-	Moved to Adelaide FL in 2016
Hackham		Hawks	Hackham Oval, Hackham	–	1976	1977-2020	0	1	1990	Moved to Adelaide FL in 2021
Hills United		Hills		–	1908	1908	0	-	-	Folded when Aldinga re-formed in 1909
Kangarilla		Double Blues	Kangarilla Recreation Ground, Kangarilla	HFL	1901	1915–1922, 1981–2005	0	4	2000	Returned to Hills FL in 2006
Lonsdale		Bears	Lonsdale Oval, Morphett Vale	–	1979	1979–2001	-	2	2001	Merged with O'Sullivan Beach in 2001 to form O'Sullivan Beach-Lonsdale
Macclesfield		Bloods	Macclesfield Oval, Macclesfield	HFL	1880	1984–1988	-	0	-	Returned to Hills FL in 1989
Marion		Rams	Marion Oval, Marion	SMFL	1891	1987–2017	1	-	2000	Moved to Adelaide FL in 2018
McLaren Districts		Eagles	McLaren Vale Sporting Complex, McLaren Vale	–	1998	1998–2000	-	0	-	Moved to Great Southern FL in 2001
McLaren Flat		Eagles	McLaren Flat Recreation Ground, McLaren Flat	–	1903	1903–1940, 1946–1997	8	3	1989	Merged with McLaren Vale to form McLaren Districts in 1998
McLaren Vale		Crushers	McLaren Vale Sporting Complex, McLaren Vale	–	1880	1886–1997	8	3	1995	Merged with McLaren Flat to form McLaren Districts in 1998
Meadows		Bulldogs	Stringybark Park, Meadows	HFL	1903	1983–2000	-	2	1994	Returned to Hills FL in 1999
Mitchell Park		Lions	Mitchell Park Oval, Mitchell Park	SMFL	1969	1994–2000	-	0	-	Moved to SAAFL in 2001
Morphettville Park		Roos	Kellett Reserve Oval, Morphettville	SMFL	1958	1987–2016	1	-	1990	Moved to Adelaide FL in 2017
Mount Bold			Kangarilla Recreation Ground, Kangarilla	HCFA	1961	1964–1965	0	-	-	Folded when Kangarilla re-formed in 1966
Mount Compass		Bulldogs	Mount Compass Oval, Mount Compass	FPFA	1924	1946–1952	0	-	-	Moved to Great Southern FL in 1953
Myponga		Mudlarks	Myponga Oval, Myponga	–	1946	1946–1966	3	-	1960	Moved to Great Southern FL in 1967
Northern United			Morphett Vale Memorial Oval, Morphett Vale & Old Noarlunga Oval, Old Noarlunga	–	1936	1936–1937	0	-	-	De-merged into Morphett Vale and Noarlunga in 1938
O'Sullivan Beach		Lions	O'Sullivan Beach Oval, O'Sullivan Beach	–	1977	1978–2001	-	3	1997	Merged with Lonsdale in 2001 to form O'Sullivan Beach-Lonsdale
O'Sullivan Beach-Lonsdale		Lions	Lonsdale Oval, Morphett Vale	–	2001	2002–2017	0	-	-	Moved to Adelaide FL in 2018
Plympton		Bulldogs	Plympton Oval, Plympton Park	SMFL	1937	1987–1989	3	-	1989	Moved to South Australian FA in 1990
Sellick's Hill		Hills		–	1880s	1886–1899, 1907	2	-	1907	Merged with Aldinga to form Hills United in 1908
Willunga		Demons	Willunga Recreation Reserve, Willunga	–	1874	1886–1912, 1919–1985	30	-	1984	Moved to Great Southern FL in 1986
Yankalilla		Tigers	Yankalilla Memorial Park, Yankalilla	GSFL	1889	1957–1967	2	-	1963	Moved to Great Southern FL in 1968

== Grades ==
The SFL consists of:

Traditional Name	Current name	Premiership Shield	Best & Fairest Medal	Grand Final Medal	Goalkicker Trophy
Division 1	A-Grade	Vignerons Shield (Note: Vignerons Shield awarded in 1920 for the first time)	Mail Medal (Note: Mail Medal formerly known as President's Medal)	J. H. Warren Medal	Herb Metcalf Trophy
Division 1 Reserves	B-Grade	Southern FA Shield	Lovelock Medal	Ken Donne Medal	Dick Burgan Trophy
Division 3 Reserves	C-Grade	SFL Shield	Graham Gunn Medal	Merv Mules Medal	
Senior Colts	U/17.5	A.D. Hall Shield	Bob Ryan Medal	Steve Macklin Medal	
Junior Colts	U/15	Broughton Shield	Clem Hurst Medal	R.W. Oliver Medal	
Sub-Junior Colts	U/13	Johnny Davis Shield	Des Halliday Medal (Note: Des Halliday Medal formerly known as Brian March Medal)	Marc Constable Medal	
Mini Colts	U/12	non-competitive	no medal	no grand final	no goals recorded
Mini Colts	U/10	non-competitive	no medal	no grand final	no goals recorded
Mini Colts	U/8	non-competitive	no medal	no grand final	no goals recorded
Division 1 Women	Open Women	Jan Bache Shield	Stephanie Dempsey Medal	Robert Bache Medal	
Senior Girls	U/17	Jan Manuel Shield	Katrine Hildyard Medal	Kym McKay Medal	
Junior Girls	U/14	Mark McKay Shield	Paul Crate Medal	Kylie Loveridge Medal	

=== Former Grades ===
Grade	Years	Premiership Shield	Best & Fairest Medal	Grand Final Medal	Goalkicker Trophy
Division 2	1977–2001	Denny's Shield	Ken Donne Medal		
Division 2 Reserves	1978–2001	J. H. Warren Shield	Warren Medal		
Div. 2 Senior Colts	1991–2000	SFL Shield	Des Halliday Medal		
Div. 2 Junior Colts	1983–2001	SFL Shield	Leahy Medal		
Div. 2 Sub-Junior Colts	1981, 1983–91, 1995–2001	SFL Shield	SFL Medal		
Maroon Group U/16 (Sunday U/16)	2000–01, 2003, 2006–12, 2014–16	SFL Shield	A.J. Griffin Medal	John Hall Medal	
Maroon Group U/14 (Sunday U/14)	2000–01, 2003–16	SFL Shield	Chris Leahy Medal	Gary Davenport Medal	
Under 13	1982–1991	SFL Shield	Annett Medal		

]

== Players Recruited to AFL/VFL ==
Pick	Draft	Name	SFL Club	SANFL Club	Recruited to	Later Clubs
–	1932 Signing	Tom Waye	Willunga	Port Adelaide	Footscray	
20	1986 National Draft	Brenton Harris	Reynella	South Adelaide	North Melbourne	
4	1987 National Draft	Andrew Brockhurst	Reynella	South Adelaide	Fitzroy	
52	1989 National Draft	Rod Jameson	Morphett Vale	South Adelaide	North Melbourne	Adelaide (see below)
101	1989 National Draft	Richard Harrison	Christies Beach	South Adelaide	Geelong	
–	1991 Zone Selection	Rod Jameson	Morphett Vale	Glenelg	Adelaide	
–	1991 Zone Selection	Nigel Smart	Christies Beach	South Adelaide	Adelaide	
–	1992 Zone Selection	Chris Groom	Christies Beach	South Adelaide	Adelaide	Fremantle, North Melbourne
–	1992 Zone Selection	Tony Modra	Christies Beach	West Adelaide	Adelaide	Fremantle
–	1992 Zone Selection	Mark Viska	O'Sullivan Beach	Glenelg	Adelaide	
37	1992 National Draft	Matthew Rogers	Happy Valley	South Adelaide	Richmond	
48	1992 National Draft	Andrew Osborn	Reynella	South Adelaide	Geelong	Port Adelaide (see below)
22	1993 Pre-Season Draft	Craig McRae	O'Sullivan Beach & Hackham	Glenelg	Brisbane Bears	Brisbane Lions
29	1994 National Draft	Jason Torney	Morphett Vale	South Adelaide	Richmond	Adelaide
51	1994 National Draft	Clay Sampson	Morphett Vale	South Adelaide	Melbourne	Adelaide, Richmond
17	1995 National Draft	Scott Welsh	Marion	West Adelaide	North Melbourne	Adelaide, Western Bulldogs
46	1995 National Draft	Ben Moore	Reynella	Glenelg	Richmond	
54	1995 National Draft	Adam Ansell	Flagstaff Hill	West Adelaide	Hawthorn	
–	1996 Zone Selection	Nathan Eagleton	Happy Valley	West Adelaide	Port Adelaide	Western Bulldogs
–	1996 Zone Selection	Andrew Osborn	Reynella	South Adelaide	Port Adelaide	
3	1998 Pre-Season Draft	Matthew Bode	Brighton DOS	Glenelg	Port Adelaide	Adelaide
16	1998 Rookie Draft	Ben Marsh	Flagstaff Hill	West Adelaide	Adelaide	Richmond
4	1998 National Draft	Ryan Fitzgerald	Port Noarlunga	South Adelaide	Sydney Swans	Adelaide
43	1999 Rookie Draft	Matthew Golding	Reynella	Glenelg	Adelaide	
4	2000 Rookie Draft	Michael Doughty	Reynella	South Adelaide	Adelaide	
26	2000 Rookie Draft	Dean Brogan	Christies Beach	South Adelaide	Port Adelaide	Greater Western Sydney (see below)
20	2000 National Draft	Kane Cornes	Brighton DOS	Glenelg	Port Adelaide	
54	2000 National Draft	Jarrad Sundqvist	Brighton DOS	Glenelg	Sydney Swans	
3	2001 Rookie Draft	Chris Hall	Hackham	South Adelaide	Port Adelaide	
37	2001 Rookie Draft	Matthew Golding	Reynella	Glenelg	Adelaide	
40	2002 Rookie Draft	Ben Rutten	Happy Valley	West Adelaide	Adelaide	
29	2003 Rookie Draft	Jason Porplyzia	Happy Valley	West Adelaide	Adelaide	
1	2003 National Draft	Adam Cooney	Flagstaff Hill	West Adelaide	Western Bulldogs	Essendon
11	2003 National Draft	Beau Waters	Happy Valley	West Adelaide	West Coast	
12	2004 National Draft	Danny Meyer	Flagstaff Hill	Glenelg	Richmond	Port Adelaide (see below)
9	2006 Pre-Season Draft	Jason Porplyzia	Happy Valley	West Adelaide	Adelaide	
66	2007 National Draft	Tom McNamara	Happy Valley	South Adelaide	Melbourne	
20	2009 Rookie Draft	Danny Meyer	Flagstaff Hill	Glenelg	Port Adelaide	
52	2009 National Draft	Justin Bollenhagen	Reynella	South Adelaide	Fremantle	
14	2010 Rookie Draft	Taite Silverlock	Happy Valley	West Adelaide	Essendon	
–	2011 GWS Concession	Josh Bruce	Flagstaff Hill	Glenelg	Greater Western Sydney	St Kilda
19	2012 National Draft	Ben Kennedy	Brighton DOS	Glenelg	Collingwood	
12	2013 Pre-Season Draft	Dean Brogan	Christies Beach	South Adelaide	Greater Western Sydney	
47	2014 National Draft	Cory Gregson	Reynella & Brighton DOS	Glenelg	Geelong	
48	2015 National Draft	Bailey Williams	Brighton DOS	Glenelg	Western Bulldogs	
1	2017 Rookie Draft	Sam Draper	Reynella	South Adelaide	Essendon	
15	2018 Women's Rookie Draft	Brianna Walling	Reynella	Morphettville Park (SAWFL)	Adelaide	
8	2018 Women's Draft	Nikki Gore	Christies Beach	Christies Beach (SAWFL)	Adelaide	Fremantle
25	2020 National Draft	Brayden Cook	Happy Valley	South Adelaide	Adelaide	
44	2020 National Draft	Beau McCreery	Cove	South Adelaide	Collingwood	
1	2021 National Draft	Jason Horne-Francis	Christies Beach	South Adelaide	North Melbourne	Port Adelaide
14	2022 Rookie Draft	Will Verrall	Christies Beach	South Adelaide	Melbourne	
4	2022 Mid-Season Draft	Brett Turner	Flagstaff Hill	Glenelg	Adelaide	
4	2023 Mid-Season Draft	Matt Coulthard	Port Noarlunga	Glenelg	Richmond	

== Senior premierships winners ==
=== Division 1 ===
- 1886–1891 Unknown
- 1892 Willunga
- 1893 Willunga Undefeated
- 1894 Willunga
- 1895 Willunga
- 1896 Sellick's Hill
- 1897 Willunga
- 1898 Willunga Undefeated
- 1899 Willunga Undefeated
- 1900 In Recess
- 1901 Willunga
- 1902 Willunga
- 1903 Willunga
- 1904 Willunga
- 1905 McLaren Vale
- 1906 McLaren Vale
- 1907 Sellick's Hill
- 1908 McLaren Vale
- 1909 Willunga
- 1910 Willunga
- 1911 Willunga
- 1912 Willunga
- 1913–1914 In Recess
- 1915 McLaren Vale
- 1916–1918 In Recess
- 1919 Willunga
- 1920 McLaren Vale
- 1921 Noarlunga
- 1922 Noarlunga
- 1923 Willunga
- 1924 McLaren Vale
- 1925 Noarlunga
- 1926 Noarlunga
- 1927 Aldinga
- 1928 Aldinga
- 1929 Aldinga
- 1930 Aldinga
- 1931 Aldinga
- 1932 Aldinga
- 1933 Hillside
- 1934 Aldinga
- 1935 Hillside
- 1936 Willunga
- 1937 Hillside Undefeated
- 1938 Willunga
- 1939 Hillside Undefeated
- 1940 Season Abandoned
- 1941–1945 In Recess
- 1946 McLaren Flat
- 1947 McLaren Flat
- 1948 Willunga
- 1949 Willunga
- 1950 Willunga
- 1951 Willunga
- 1952 Willunga
- 1953 Myponga
- 1954 Willunga
- 1955 Willunga
- 1956 Willunga
- 1957 Myponga
- 1958 McLaren Vale
- 1959 McLaren Vale
- 1960 Myponga
- 1961 Willunga
- 1962 Yankalilla
- 1963 Yankalilla
- 1964 Willunga
- 1965 Port Noarlunga
- 1966 McLaren Flat
- 1967 Christies Beach
- 1968 Christies Beach
- 1969 Reynella
- 1970 Noarlunga
- 1971 Christies Beach Undefeated
- 1972 Christies Beach
- 1973 Port Noarlunga
- 1974 Christies Beach
- 1975 Reynella
- 1976 McLaren Flat
- 1977 Reynella
- 1978 Morphett Vale
- 1979 Morphett Vale
- 1980 Morphett Vale
- 1981 Morphett Vale
- 1982 Noarlunga
- 1983 Christies Beach
- 1984 Willunga
- 1985 Port Noarlunga
- 1986 Noarlunga
- 1987 Plympton
- 1988 Plympton
- 1989 Plympton
- 1990 Morphettville Park
- 1991 Noarlunga
- 1992 Happy Valley
- 1993 Happy Valley
- 1994 Christies Beach
- 1995 Happy Valley
- 1996 Happy Valley
- 1997 Port Noarlunga
- 1998 Happy Valley
- 1999 Happy Valley
- 2000 Marion
- 2001 Noarlunga
- 2002 Brighton District and Old Scholars
- 2003 Happy Valley
- 2004 Morphett Vale
- 2005 Morphett Vale
- 2006 Morphett Vale
- 2007 Morphett Vale Undefeated
- 2008 Cove
- 2009 Morphett Vale
- 2010 Reynella
- 2011 Brighton Bombers
- 2012 Happy Valley
- 2013 Reynella
- 2014 Noarlunga
- 2015 Reynella
- 2016 Flagstaff Hill
- 2017 Flagstaff Hill
- 2018 Flagstaff Hill
- 2019 Flagstaff Hill
- 2020 Flagstaff Hill Undefeated
- 2021 Flagstaff Hill Undefeated
- 2022 Reynella
- 2023 Flagstaff Hill Undefeated
- 2024 Reynella
- 2025 Port Noarlunga
- 2026 Flagstaff Hill

=== Division 2 ===
- 1977 Reynella C
- 1978 Morphett Vale C
- 1979 Morphett Vale C
- 1980 McLaren Vale
- 1981 McLaren Vale
- 1982 Kangarilla
- 1983 McLaren Flat
- 1984 Meadows
- 1985 Flagstaff Hill
- 1986 O'Sullivan Beach
- 1987 Kangarilla
- 1988 McLaren Flat
- 1989 McLaren Flat
- 1990 Hackham
- 1991 Aldinga
- 1992 Mawson
- 1993 Aldinga
- 1994 Meadows
- 1995 McLaren Vale
- 1996 O'Sullivan Beach
- 1997 O'Sullivan Beach
- 1998 Cove
- 1999 Kangarilla
- 2000 Kangarilla
- 2001 Lonsdale

== Mail Medal ==
Each season the Mail Medal is awarded to the player adjudged the Fairest and Most Brilliant by the umpires on a 3-2-1 match voting system. The Mail Medal is named after the Sunday Mail newspaper.

Year	Name	Club
1925	W. Wilson	McLaren Vale
1926	Maurice Corbett	Willunga
1927	C.K. "Pete" Lovelock	Aldinga
1928	Ron Branson	Willunga
1929	Daniel Houghton	McLaren Vale
1930	Ron Branson	Willunga
1931	Maurice Corbett	Willunga
1932	Maurice Corbett	Willunga
1933	Maurice Corbett	Willunga
1934	Ron Branson	Hillside
1935	Maurice Corbett	Willunga
1936	Maurice Corbett	Willunga
1937	Ken Noblett	Aldinga
1938	Richard (Dick) Burgan	Hillside
1939	Jim Little	Willunga
1940	Jim Little	Willunga
1941–1945	not awarded	
1946	Ed Holloway	McLaren Vale
1947	Merv Crocker	McLaren Vale
1948	John Kemp	Mount Compass
1949	Bob Ryan	Reynella
1950	Merv Crocker	McLaren Vale
1951	Bill Trenorden	Port Noarlunga
1952	Noel Chapman	McLaren Flat
1953	Alwyn (Pop) Faggotter	Myponga
1954	Bernie Kelly	Myponga
1955	Merv Crocker	McLaren Vale
1956	Richard Hamlyn	Yankalilla
1957	Darcy Cox	Reynella
1958	Murray Fraser	McLaren Flat
1959	Dennis Rattigan	Willunga
1960	William Amee	Noarlunga
1961	Allan Hall	Yankalilla
1962	Alex Fimeri	Noarlunga
1963	Graham Gunn	Reynella
1964	Dean Mills	McLaren Flat
1965 tied	Douglas Modra	Port Noarlunga
1965 tied	T. Barker	Yankalilla
1966	Richard Croser	Willunga
1967	Richard Croser	Willunga
1968 tied	Richard Croser	Willunga
1968 tied	Frank Howard	Christies Beach
1969	Bevan Davey	McLaren Flat
1970	John Staker	Noarlunga
1971	John Staker	Noarlunga
1972	Peter Kretschmer	McLaren Flat
1973	Wayne Potter	Willunga
1974	Ian Winton	Christies Beach
1975	Graeme Fielke	McLaren Flat
1976	Graeme Fielke	McLaren Flat
1977	Dean Willing	McLaren Vale
1978 tied	D. Elliot	McLaren Flat
1978 tied	John Blythman	McLaren Flat
1979	Peter (Jumbo) Jeffrey	Willunga
1980	Paul Crate	Christies Beach
1981	Gary Davenport	Christies Beach
1982	Barry Pilmore	Noarlunga
1983	Bernie Veide	Port Noarlunga
1984	Chris Williams	McLaren Flat
1985	Noel (Nipper) Hill	Port Noarlunga
1986	Bernie Veide	Port Noarlunga
1987	Peter Wilson	O’Sullivan Beach
1988	Steven Clark	Marion
1989	Jerry Mott	Noarlunga
1990	Jerry Mott	Noarlunga
1991 tied	Max Eddy	Morphettville Park
1991 tied	Simon Robinson	Morphett Vale
1992	Scott Wilkie	Reynella
1993	Trevor Plummer	Marion
1994	no medal awarded	
1995	Gavin Steel	Morphett Vale
1996	Ben Baxter	Noarlunga
1997	Mark Jolly	Brighton Districts and Old Scholars
1998	Keith Allan	Port Noarlunga
1999 tied	Mark Jolly	Brighton Districts and Old Scholars
1999 tied	Daniel Exelby	Marion
2000	Shane Moss	Brighton Districts and Old Scholars
2001 tied	Dale Betterman	Brighton Districts and Old Scholars
2001 tied	Brett Exelby	Marion
2002	Dale Betterman	Brighton Districts and Old Scholars
2003	Mark Jolly	Brighton Districts and Old Scholars
2004	Stephen Prescott	Reynella
2005	Scott Middleton	Reynella
2006	Andrew Bachmann	Christies Beach
2007	Jarrad Pomeroy	Happy Valley
2008	Todd Johnstone	Brighton Bombers
2009	Sebastian Guilhaus	Morphettville Park
2010	Josh Vick	Cove
2011	Braden Bayly	Morphett Vale
2012	Jonathan Eagleton	Happy Valley
2013	Jonathan Eagleton	Happy Valley
2014	Michael Shearer	Flagstaff Hill
2015	Michael Shearer	Flagstaff Hill
2016	Liam Corrie	Morphett Vale
2017	Thomas Dix	Port Noarlunga
2018	Nicholas Mott	Noarlunga
2019	Nicholas Mott	Noarlunga
2020	Michael Mazey	Christies Beach
2021	Robert Irra	Reynella
2022	Samuel Whitbread	Reynella
2023	Marc Borholm	Reynella
2024	Samuel Whitbread	Reynella

=== Ken Donne Medal ===
The Ken Donne Medal was the equivalent medal awarded for the Division 2 competition between 1977 and 2001.

Year	Name	Club
1977	John Narroway	Hackham
1978	R. Butterfield	Hackham
1979	T. Moyle	Hackham
1980	Peter Willoughby	Happy Valley
1981	Don Oliver	McLaren Vale
1982	Bernie Veide	Aldinga
1983	Chris Williams	McLaren Flat
1984	Robert Dean	O’Sullivan Beach
1985	David Nykiel	Mawson
1986	Mick Freestone	Mawson
1987	Gordon Slattery	Cove
1988	B. Low	McLaren Flat
1989	Stephen Keam	Aldinga
1990 tied	B. Ziersch	McLaren Flat
1990 tied	Paul Crate	McLaren Vale
1991	Mark Palmer	Hackham
1992	M. Burdett	Aldinga
1993	Glenn Godfrey	Kangarilla
1994	no medal awarded	
1995	Heath Thorpe	Kangarilla
1996	Glenn Godfrey	Kangarilla
1997 tied	Mark Pfeiffer	McLaren Vale
1997 tied	Nigel Gordon	O’Sullivan Beach
1998	Brian Jonas	Mitchell Park
1999	Heath Thorpe	Kangarilla
2000	Heath Thorpe	Kangarilla
2001	Heath Thorpe	Kangarilla

== 125 Year Celebrations ==
=== 125 Year Team ===
To celebrate the 125th season of the SFL, the "SFL 125 Year Team" was named in 2011.

SFL 125 Year Team
B:	John Hugo (Flat)	Lloyd Binney (Will)	Garry Reed OAM (Will)
HB:	Ron Branson (Flat, Will) Captain	Terry Fitzpatrick (Will)	C.K. "Pete" Lovelock (Ald)
C:	Maurice Corbett (Will)	Richard Croser (Will) Vice-Captain	Merv Crocker (Vale)
HF:	Graham Gunn (MV, Rey)	Jerry Mott (Noar, PtN, CB, Ald, Maw)	Mark Jolly (BDOS)
F:	Dean Mills (Flat, Noar)	Baden Taylor (MV)	Hendrick "Taffy" Waye (Will)
Foll:	Bernie Veide (PtN, Ald)	Wayne Potter (Will, Flat)	Barry Pilmore (Noar)
Int:	Paul Crate (CB, MV, Vale)	Michael Fitzgerald (PtN)	Scott Pollard (MV)
Coach:	Trevor Potts (Ply, CB, Kang, MV)		

=== Greatest Exports Team ===
Along with the 125 Year Team, the SFL also announced a team of their "Greatest Exports", a collection of players that had previously played in the SFL but had gone on to achieve at a higher level. One player, Hendrick "Taffy" Waye was selected in both the 125 Year Team and the Greatest Exports Team.

SFL Greatest Exports Team
B:	Nigel Smart (CB, South, Adel)	Ben Rutten (HV, Adel, West)	Michael Doughty (Rey, Adel, South)
HB:	Matthew Rogers (HV, Rich, South)	Rod Jameson (MV, Adel, Glen)	Jason Torney (MV, Rich, Adel, South)
C:	Darren Kappler (Rey, Fitz, Haw, Syd, South, Glchy)	Adam Cooney (FH, WB, West) Captain	Kane Cornes (BDOS, PortP, Glen)
HF:	Tony Burgan (Flat, Sturt)	Graham Cornes OAM (Rey, NM, Glen, South) Coach	Matthew Bode (BDOS, PortP, Adel, Glen)
F:	Scott Welsh (Mar, NM, Adel, WB, West, WWT)	Tony Modra (CB, Adel, Freo, West)	Craig McRae (OSB, Hack, BrisL, Glen)
Foll:	Dean Brogan (CB, PortP, Greater Western Sydney, South)	Paul Bagshaw MBE (Flat, Sturt)	Nathan Eagleton (HV, PortP, WB, West, Nwd)
Int:	Hendrick "Taffy" Waye (Will, Sturt)	Clay Sampson (MV, Melb, Adel, Rich, South)	Beau Waters (HV, WCE, West, Clrmt)
Coach:	Graham Cornes OAM (Rey, Adel, South, Glen)		

Key: Adel – Adelaide Crows (AFL), Ald – Aldinga, BDOS – Brighton Bombers/Brighton District and Old Scholars, BrisL – Brisbane Lions (AFL), CB – Christies Beach, Clrmt – Claremont (WAFL), Fitz – Fitzroy (VFL/AFL), FH – Flagstaff Hill, Flat – McLaren Flat/Hillside, Freo – Fremantle (AFL), Glen – Glenelg (SANFL), Glchy – Glenorchy (TANFL/TFL/TSL), GWS – Greater Western Sydney (AFL), Hack – Hackham, Haw – Hawthorn (VFL/AFL), HV – Happy Valley, Kang – Kangarilla, Mar – Marion, Maw – Lonsdale/Mawson, Melb – Melbourne (AFL/VFL), MV – Morphett Vale, Noar – Noarlunga, Nwd – Norwood (SANFL), NM – North Melbourne/Kangaroos (AFL/VFL), OSB – O'Sullivan Beach, Ply – Plympton, PortM – Port Adelaide (SANFL), PortP – Port Adelaide (AFL), PtN – Port Noarlunga, Rey – Reynella, Rich – Richmond (AFL/VFL), South – South Adelaide (SANFL), Sturt – Sturt (SANFL), Syd – Sydney Swans/South Melbourne (AFL/VFL), Vale – McLaren Vale, WB – Western Bulldogs/Footscray (AFL/VFL), WCE – West Coast (AFL/VFL), West – West Adelaide (SANFL), Will – Willunga, WWT – Woodville-West Torrens (SANFL)

== Hall of Fame ==
The Southern Football League Hall of Fame was established in 2007 in order to provide due recognition to those who have given outstanding service to Australian Football throughout the League history since its establishment in 1886.

Membership is granted to Players, Umpires, Coaches, Administrators, Support Staff and any persons who have provided outstanding service to Australian Football through the Southern Football League or its clubs and, because of the nature of the League, combinations of all types of service is considered.

After the initial inauguration a maximum of five (5) candidates each year are selected by the Hall of Fame Committee for approval by the League Directors.

The general criterion for selection is to have exceptionally served Australian Football through the Southern Football League for a minimum period of 25 years (which do not need to be consecutive).

There may be some exceptions to the general rule and the Hall of Fame Committee shall have the right to nominate these to the Directors for endorsement.

ELITE PLAYERS – Players who have given exceptional service shall be considered (for example the winning of three (3) Mail Medals in "A" Grade is considered exceptional).

SPECIAL SERVICES – Persons who provide special services to Football in exceptional or unusual capacities.

ELITE COACHES – Coaches with established records of coaching within the League.

=== SFL Hall of Fame Members ===
#	Year Inducted	Inductee	Category	Club(s)
1	2007	Christopher (Chris) Leahy OAM	Administrator, Coach	PtN, SFL
2	2007	Desmond (Des) Halliday	Administrator	Rey, SFL
3	2007	Clement (Clem) Hurst	Player, Administrator	Noar, Vale, SFL
4	2007	James (Jim) Warren	Player, Administrator	PtN, Flat, SFL
5	2007	Alan Griffin OAM	Administrator	Maw, SFL
6	2007	Robin Perry	Umpire, Administrator	PtN, CSLFUP
7	2007	Leonard (Lenny) Higgs	Trainer	Noar
8	2007	Mervyn (Merv) Mules	Administrator	MV, SFL
9	2007	Brian March	Player, Administrator	CB, SFL
10	2007	Ronald Branson	Player, Coach, Administrator	Will, Flat, SFL
11	2007	John Hall OAM	Player, Coach, Administrator	CB, PtN, SFL
12	2007	Robert (Bob) Ryan	Player, Coach, Administrator	Rey, SFL
13	2007	Martin Clark	Player, Trainer, Umpire, Administrator	Noar, Vale, CSLFUP
14	2007	William (Chum) Reed	Trainer, Administrator	Will
15	2007	Barry Bromilow	Umpire, Trainer, Administrator	Rey, CSLFUP
16	2007	Graham Douglas	Umpire, Administrator	CSLFUP
17	2007	Barrington (Barry) Conroy	Umpire, Administrator	CSLFUP
18	2007	Kenneth (Ken) Donne	Administrator	PtN, SFL
19	2007	Noel (Rooster) Murton	Player, Coach, Umpire, Administrator	PtN, CSLFUP
20	2007	Barry Pilmore	Player, Coach	Noar, Rey
21	2007	Graham Gunn	Player, Coach, Umpire, Administrator	Rey, MV, SFL, CSLFUP
22	2007	Michael (Mick) Fitzgerald	Player, Coach, Administrator	PtN
23	2007	Maurice (Spog) Corbett	Elite Player	Will
24	2007	Terence (Terry) Fitzpatrick	Player, Coach, Administrator	Will
25	2007	Richard (Dick) Croser	Elite Player	Will
26	2007	Arthur (Stoker) Tickle	Umpire, Administrator	Rey
27	2007	Garry (Chum) Reed OAM	Player, Coach, Trainer, Administrator	Will
28	2007	Bernard (Bernie) Veide	Elite Player	PtN, Noar, Ald
29	2007	Paul Lindner	Umpire, Administrator	CSLFUP
30	2007	Glenn (Hoova) Godfrey	Elite Player	Kang, CSLFUP
31	2007	Kenneth Drake	Administrator	PtN
32	2007	Wesley Green	Player, Administrator	Rey
33	2007	Robert Lloyd	Player, Coach, Trainer, Administrator	Rey
34	2007	Lloyd Binney	Player, Coach, Administrator	Will
35	2007	Janet (Jan) Bache	Administrator	SFL
36	2007	Trevor Potts	Elite Coach	CB, Ply, Kang, MV
37	2007	Heath Thorpe	Elite Player	Kang
38	2007	Frank Aldam	Player, Coach, Administrator	Will
39	2007	Cecil (Pete) Lovelock	Player, Administrator	Ald, SFL
40	2007	Leo Corbett	Player, Umpire	Will, CSLFUP
41	2007	Robert (Bob) Bache OAM	Umpire, Administrator	SFL, CSLFUP
42	2007	Mervyn (Merv) Crocker	Elite Player	Vale
43	2007	Mark Jolly	Elite Player	BDOS
44	2007	Kevin Lloyd	Player, Coach, Administrator	Rey
45	2007	Allan (Zac) Jolly	Player, Coach, Administrator	Rey, Kang, SFL
46	2007	Graeme (Grae) MacKinnon	Special Services – Journalism	Maw, SFL
47	2008	Robert (Bob) Burton	Elite Umpire	CSLFUP
48	2008	Robert Dean	Player, Coach, Umpire	OSB, OSBL, CSLFUP
49	2008	Paul Crate OAM	Player, Coach, Umpire	MV, CB, Vale, CSLFUP
50	2008	Colin Cameron	Player	Flat
51	2008	V.G. (Gil) Mogg	Administrator	PtN
52	2009	David Whiley	Umpire, Administrator	CSLFUP
53	2009	Gary Bilney	Player, Umpire	Kang, CSLFUP
54	2009	Craig Warman OAM	Player, Administrator	OSB, SFL
55	2009	Shane Fishlock	Player	MV
56	2010	Janice (Jan) Manuel	Administrator	MV
57	2010	Lance Breavington	Administrator	MVP
58	2010	Simon Robinson	Player, Coach, Umpire	MV, CSLFUP
59	2010	William (Billy) Chester	Administrator	MVP
60	2010	Steven Carlyle	Player	Noar
61	2011	Brian Proctor	Umpire, Administrator	Rey, CSLFUP
62	2011	Chris Johnson	Umpire, Administrator	CSLFUP
63	2011	Gary Davenport	Player, Administrator	PtN, CB, SFL
64	2011	Marc Constable	Player, Coach, Administrator	Noar, Vale, SFL
65	2011	Richard (Dick) Burgan	Player, Administrator	Flat, SFL
66	2012	Christopher Hams	Player	Will
67	2012	Christopher Burgan	Player	Flat
68	2012	Gordon Hay	Player, Administrator	MVP
69	2012	Geoffrey Goldsmith	Player	PtN, Rey
70	2012	Robert (Bob) Boehm	Coach, Administrator	CB
71	2013	Jerry Mott	Player	Noar, PtN, CB, Ald, Maw
72	2013	John Hugo	Player	Flat
73	2013	Robert (Bob) McMahon	Player, Coach, Trainer, Administrator	Hack, Noar, Rey, MV
74	2013	Chris Galley	Player, Administrator	Cove
75	2013	Gary Verrall	Player	Will
76	2014	Steven Turner	Player, Administrator	HV, Rey
77	2014	Colin Lessue	Administrator	Mar, SFL
78	2014	Luke Berry	Player	CB, PtN
79	2014	Paul Vaughan	Player, Coach, Administrator	PtN
80	2014	Bryce Garrard	Player	Ald
81	2015	Hendrick (Taffy) Waye	Player	Will
82	2015	Max Joyce	Umpire	CSLFUP
83	2015	Darren Mason	Player, Coach	CB
84	2015	Baden Taylor	Player	MV
85	2015	Scott Pollard	Player	MV
86	2016	Stephen Macklin	Coach, Administrator	HV, MV, SFL
87	2016	Darren Hincks	Umpire	CSLFUP
88	2016	Michael Schutz	Player	Noar
89	2016	Darren Twigden	Player	HV
90	2016	Mark Anderson	Player	Noar
91	2017	Nathan Gill	Player	HV
92	2017	Jason Davidson	Player, Coach, Administrator	PtN
93	2017	Ashley Sanders	Player, Administrator	Ald
94	2017	Wayne Graham	Umpire	CSLFUP
95	2017	Barry Ramsay	Player, Coach, Administrator	Cove
96	2018	Andrew John (Hank) Middleton OAM	Trainer, Administrator	HV, STA
97	2018	Lex Triffitt	Player, Coach, Administrator	Vale, Flat
98	2018	Kevin Wright	Player	Rey
99	2018	David Willoughby	Administrator	Rey
100	2018	Horace (Horrie) Leaker	Player, Administrator	Ald, SFL
101	2019	Grant McAvaney	Coach, Administrator	FH, Ply
102	2019	Darcy Cheney	Umpire, Player	CSLFUP, Maw, CB
103	2019	Matthew Wise	Player, Coach, Administrator	CB, PtN
104	2019	Mark Jensen	Umpire, Coach, Administrator	CSLFUP, Hack
105	2019	Terry Gunn	Player, Coach	Rey, MV
106	2021	Gary Summerton	Player, Coach, Administrator	Rey, Noar, SFL
107	2021	Mark McKay	Trainer, Administrator	Lon, OSBL, SFL, STA
108	2021	Michael Irvine	Player, Coach	Noar, CB, Flat
109	2021	Garry Jolly	Player, Coach, Administrator	Rey, Kang
110	2021	Robert William Oliver	Player, Administrator	Vale, SFL
111	2022	Michael Zaluski	Player	MV
112	2022	Scott Mooney	Trainer, Administrator	OSB, CB, MV, Mar, Rey, SFL, STA
113	2022	Gary Carlyon	Umpire	CSLFUP
114	2022	Norman (Norm) Bergman	Player, Coach, Administrator	PtN, McL, SFL
115	2022	Michael Bernard (Bernie) Kelly	Player	Myp, SFL
116	2023	Paul Daly	Player, Coach, Administrator	CB, SFL
117	2023	David Popplewell	Umpire	CSLFUP
118	2023	Malcolm Martin	Administrator	SFL, Cove
119	2023	Shane Hill	Player	MV
120	2024	David Earl	Player, Coach	MV, Cove, Flat, Rey, SFL
121	2024	Stephen Prescott	Player	Rey
122	2024	Bill Threadgold	Administrator	Rey
123	2024	John Narroway	Player, Coach, Administrator	PtN, Vale, MV, Hack
124	2024	Daniel Earl	Player	MV
125	2025	Ian Jordan	Player, Administrator	MV
126	2025	Christopher Roe	Player, Umpire, Administrator	CB, Flat, CSLFUP
127	2025	Lyndon Elliott	Player, Administrator	Flat
128	2025	Wayne Andrys	Player, Coach, Trainer, Administrator	MV, CB, OSB, Ald
129	2025	Charles Leslie (Les) Furler	Player, Administrator	Noar, SFA
130	2026	Jason Peach	Player, Coach	Noar
131	2026	Alwin Leonard (Pop) Fagotter	Elite Player	Myp
132	2026	Adrian Walsh	Player, Coach, Administrator	Ald
133	2026	Wayne Potter	Elite Player	Will, Flat, CSLFUP
134	2026	Deane Mills	Elite Player	Flat, Noar
135	2026	Keith Edwin (Teddy) Broughton	Player, Trainer, Administrator	Flat, Vale, SFL
136	2026	Michael Shearer	Elite Player	FH

Key: Ald – Aldinga, BB – Brighton Bombers/Brighton District and Old Scholars, CB – Christies Beach, Cove – Cove, CSLFUP – Combined Southern Leagues Football Umpires Panel, FH -Flagstaff Hill, Flat – McLaren Flat/Hillside, Hack – Hackham, HV – Happy Valley, Kang – Kangarilla, Mar – Marion, Maw – Lonsdale/Mawson, McL - McLaren, MV – Morphett Vale, MVP – Morphettville Park, Myp - Myponga, Noar – Noarlunga, OSB – O'Sullivan Beach, OSBL – O'Sullivan Beach-Lonsdale, Ply – Plympton, PtN – Port Noarlunga, Rey – Reynella, SFL – Southern Football League/Association, STA - Southern Trainers Association, Vale – McLaren Vale, Will – Willunga

== Grand Finals ==
=== Southern Football League 'A' Grade Grand Final 2025 ===
Happy Valley 7 – 4 – 46 defeated by Port Noarlunga 7 – 6 – 48

Happy Valley
Goal Kickers: D. Tucker 2, H. Davenport, L. Edwards, N. Kraemer, S. Oliver, C. Rogers
Best Players: N. Kraemer, H. Spacie, C. Rogers, J. Flett, J. Beeche, D. Tucker

Port Noarlunga
Goal Kickers: Z. Sproule 3, D. Flavel, G. Karpany, O. Petrohilos, K. Smith
Best Players: Z. Sproule, B. Cook, N. Paredes, R. McKay, C. Wiseman, N. Steele

J. H. Warren Medal: Zachary Sproule

Umpires
Field: Benjamin Moss, Nicholas Price, Darren White
Boundary: Lucas Elliot, Drew Reynolds, Zac James, Jack Harrison
Goal: Lachlan Weeden, Alex Manning

Venue: Magain Stadium, Noarlunga Centre

=== Southern Football League 'A' Grade Grand Final 2024 ===
Reynella 6 – 14 – 50 defeated Flagstaff Hill 5 – 10 – 40

Reynella
Goal Kickers: J. Agnew 2, B. Marshman 2, B. Potter, D. Roser

Flagstaff Hill
Goal Kickers: B. Aldridge 2, A. Grayson, R. Mountford, J. Rosman

J. H. Warren Medal: Tyler Davies

Umpires
Field: Tobias Medlin, Nathan Salt, Alex Ker
Boundary: Lucas Sutton, Leo Walkley, Tyler Ifould, Lucas Elliot
Goal: Kym Marshall, Jon Hall

Venue: Flinders University Stadium, Noarlunga Centre

=== Southern Football League 'A' Grade Grand Final 2023 ===
Flagstaff Hill 16 – 11 – 107 defeated Noarlunga 7 – 6 – 48

Flagstaff Hill
Goal Kickers: S. Smith 4, S. Jacobs 3, N. Beenham 2, B. Patterson, D. Kearsley, N. Bailey, R. Mountford

Noarlunga
Goal Kickers: J. Anderson 2, B. Hann, C. Gaspari, J. Kappler, M. Eagles

J. H. Warren Medal: Sam Jacobs

Umpires
Field: Alex Cornelius, Brendon Caruso, Darren White
Boundary: Lucas Sutton, Josh Niederer, Hayden Sutton, Jack Harrison
Goal: Stephen Young, Jono White

Venue: Flinders University Stadium, Noarlunga Centre

=== Southern Football League 'A' Grade Grand Final 2022 ===
Reynella 9 – 3 – 57 defeated Morphett Vale 6 – 7 – 43

Reynella
Goal Kickers: C. Semple 3, B. Potter 2, B. Marshman 2, M. Borholm, N. McLean

Morphett Vale
Goal Kickers: D. Iljcesen 2, D. Williams, B. Hartwig, L. Corrie, D. Noble

J. H. Warren Medal: Cam McGree

Umpires
Field: Alex Cornelius, David Popplewell, Darren White
Boundary: Nathan Rorhlach, Dylan Worrall, Hayden Sutton, Harrison Everett
Goal: Stephen Young, Jacob Crossfield

Venue: Flinders University Stadium, Noarlunga Centre

=== Southern Football League 'A' Grade Grand Final 2021 ===
Flagtsaff Hill 12 – 11 – 83 defeated Morphett Vale 2 – 5 – 17

Flagstaff Hill
Goal Kickers: D. Butcher 3, R. Mountford 2, M. Johnson 2, D. Kearsley, T. Carney, B. Heyward-Ferors, B. Patterson, M. Walton
Best PLayers, M. Johnson, S. Theraldson, M. Walton, D. Kearsley, A. Shearer, T. Carney

Morphett Vale
Goal Kickers: D. Noble, J. Dal Santo
Best Players: J. Dal Santo, C. Lock, D. Bode, B. Sowter, J. Dorshorst, A. Baker

J. H. Warren Medal: Mitchell Johnson

Umpires
Field: Alex Cornelius, Harry Marshall, Simon Thompson
Boundary: Mark Ames, Hayden Sutton, Austin Robertson, Nicolas Thompson
Goal: Joshua Goldswothy, Jacob Crossfield

Venue: Flinders University Stadium, Noarlunga Centre

=== Southern Football League 'A' Grade Grand Final 2020 ===
Flagstaff Hill 18 – 13 – 121 defeated Noarlunga 9 – 1 – 55

Flagstaff Hill
Goal Kickers: D. Butcher 4, S. Smith 3, T. Carney 2, B. Rossi 2, R. Mountford 2, D Kearsley, M. Shearer, B. Heyward-Ferors, N. Beenham, M. Johnson
Best PLayers: S. Theraldson, D. Kearsley, B. Patterson, B. Rossi, C. Puiatti, D. Webb

Noarlunga
Goal Kickers: V. Robertson 3, R. Martell 3, J. Beard, S. Miller, J. Birch
Best PLayers: V. Robertson, R. Martell, Z. Williams, S. Carlyle, B, Goldfinch

J. H. Warren Medal: David Kearsley

Umpires
Field: Alex Cornelius, Simon Thompson, Dennis Rice
Boundary: Joel Stone, Dylan Worrall, Mark Ames, Craig White
Goal: Darren Hincks, Stephen Young

Venue: Flinders University Stadium, Noarlunga Centre

=== Southern Football League 'A' Grade Grand Final 2019 ===
Noarlunga 7 – 6 – 48 defeated by Flagstaff Hill 12 – 9 – 81

Noarlunga
Goal Kickers: T. Milera 2, N. Mott 2, V. Robertson, T. Mott, R. Martell
Best PLayers: S. Hamilton, J. Brown, B. Goldfinch, J. Thewlis

Flagstaff Hill
Goal Kickers: M. Hollis 3, M. Renfrey 2, S. Smith 2, D. Butcher, S. Osmond, B. Rossi, C. Puiatti, M. Johnson
Best PLayers: S. Theraldson, D. Kearsley, M. Hollis, M. Renfrey, D. Webb, C. Davies

J. H. Warren Medal: Mark Hollis

Umpires
Field: David Popplewell, Mark Jensen, Mark Neville
Boundary: Craig White, Jayden Dunning, James Holmes, Evan Salter
Goal: Trevor Abblett, Stephen Young

Venue: Flinders University Stadium, Noarlunga Centre

=== Southern Football League 'A' Grade Grand Final 2018 ===
Flagstaff Hill 21 – 16 – 142 defeated Reynella 6 – 6 – 42

Flagstaff Hill
Goal Kickers: J. Vandermeer 4, S. Osmond 3, S. Smith 3, B. Rossi 3, D. Bucher 2, M. Shearer, M. Johnson, A. Albanese, J. Albanese, J. Vandermmer, B. Heyward-Ferors
Best PLayers: M. Shearer, M. Fazekas, S. Osmond, S. Heatley, S. Theraldson, M. Renfrey

Reynella
Goal Kickers: B. Lockett 3, C. Semple 3
Best PLayers: C. Ellison, S. Hamilton, M. Portlock, C. Semple, S. Farrelly, R. Mahony

J. H. Warren Medal: Micahel Shearer

Umpires
Field: Grant Reilly, Brendon Caruso, Matthew Browne
Boundary: Liam Trouptsidis, Nathan Rohrlach, Evan Salter, Jayden Dunning
Goal: Kym Marshall, Stephen Young

Venue: Flinders University Stadium, Noarlunga Centre

=== Southern Football League 'A' Grade Grand Final 2017 ===
Flagstaff Hill 13 – 16 – 94 defeated Noarlunga 8 – 9 – 57

Flagstaff Hill
Goal Kickers: S. Smith 3, D. Buthcer 2, J. Vandermeer, S. Heatley, J. Albanese, M. Shearer, M. Johnson, B. Patterson, S. Osmond, B. Kirk
Best PLayers: S. Smith, S. Osmond, B. Kirk, M. Hollis, J. Albanese, M. Fazekas

Noarlunga
Goal Kickers: V. Robertson 3, A. Wurst 2, T. Ferguson 2, S. Carlyle
Best Players: N. Mott, V. Robertson, S. Carlyle, S. Miller, T. Caudle

J. H. Warren Medal: Samuel Osmond

Umpires
Field: David Popplewell, Jason Thompson, Jarryd Simister
Boundary: Kane Marshall, Nathan Rohrlach, Matthew Rohrlach
Goal: Michael Greer, Scott Brand

Venue: Flinders University Stadium, Noarlunga Centre

=== Southern Football League 'A' Grade Grand Final 2016 ===
Flagstaff Hill 7 – 11 – 53 defeated Morphett Vale 6 – 4 – 40

Flagstaff Hill
Goal Kickers: M. Raitt 3, J. Vandermeer 2, C. Schorn 2
Best Players: M. Shearer, S. Theraldson, B. Kirk, J. Vandermeer, D. Kearsley, M. Edwards

Morphett Vale
Goal Kickers: D. Iljcesen 2, S. Byrne, D. Loveridge, N. Baly
Best PLayers: B. Baly, T. Bennetts, M. Bode, M. Smith, M. Hodge, W. Carroll

J. H. Warren Medal: Michael Shearer

Venue: Flinders University Stadium, Noarlunga Centre

=== Southern Football League 'A' Grade Grand Final 2015 ===
Reynella 18.7 – 115 defeated Brighton Districts and Old Scholars 8.8 – 56

Reynella
Goal Kickers: J. McEntee 5, C. Bradwell, C. Ellison, A. Broadbent 3 each, C. Semple, J. Carter, M. Doughty, R. Mahony 1 each
Best Players: L. McEntee, C. Ellison, R. Mahony, R. Frick, A. Broadbent, S. Bradshaw

Brighton Districts and Old Scholars
Goal Kickers: J. Carger 2, L. Price, T. Hall, J. Spurling, B. Brookman, E. Drew, T. Hoare 1 each
Best Players: W. Rivers, D. De Blaquiere, D. Lang, B. Hillier, E. Drew, J. Carger

J. H. Warren Medal: Luke McEntee(Reynella)

Venue: Hickinbotham Oval, Noarlunga Centre

Attendance: 4300

=== Southern Football League 'A' Grade Grand Final 2014 ===
Noarlunga 10.7 – 67 defeated Reynella 9.9 – 63

Noarlunga
Goal Kickers: W. Johncock 4, L. Moreen 2, S. Dean, S. Miller, M. Despott, C. Minns
Best Players: W. Johncock, T. Caudle, S. Miller, S. Dean, M. Despott, C. Hudson

Reynella
Goal Kickers: D. Paddick 2, J. McEntee 2, S. Karran, J. Carter, S. Ward, C. Semple, B. Thompson
Best Players: L. Ciampa, D. Paddick, J. Guy, S. Bradshaw, A. Broadbent, B. Lockett

J. H. Warren Medal: Waylon Johncock (Noarlunga)

Umpires
Field: Brendon Caruso, Jarryd Simister
Boundary: Jarryd Hoppo, Corey Sawtell, Harry Marshall, Darryl Seidel
Goal: Michael Greer, Darren Hinkcs

Venue: Hickinbotham Oval, Noarlunga Centre

=== Southern Football League 'A' Grade Grand Final 2013 ===
Reynella 12.11 – 83 defeated Morphettville Park 8.10 – 58

Reynella
Goal Kickers: B. McKeough, C. Semple 3 each, S. Prescott 2, B. Tilley, C. Bradwell, A. Broadbent, S. Karran 1 each
Best Players: D. Lock, J. Farrier, D. Prescott, B. Tilley, J. Guy, M. Doughty

Morphettville Park
Goal Kickers: S. Morris 3, D. Longman 2, N. Wiese, S. Wiese, E. Schneider 1 each
Best Players: T. Cranston, S. Morris, S. Talbot, B. Murphy, P. Bennett, J. Ruwoldt

J. H. Warren Medal: Jason Farrier (Reynella)

Venue: Hickinbotham Oval, Noarlunga Centre

=== Southern Football League 'A' Grade Grand Final 2012 ===
Happy Valley 14.16 – 100 defeated Brighton 7.8 – 50

Happy Valley Goal Kickers: J. Eagleton 4, J. Hiatt-Harrex 3, D. Sukkel 3, T. Grund, N. Eagleton, N. Petersen-Gray, B. Squire

Best Players: S. McKenzie, J. Brown, M. Mahar, J. Eagleton, A. Huebner.

Brighton Goal Kickers: C. Norsworthy 2, B. King, M. Baker, G. Phillips, M. Pethick, C. Mauger

Best Players: J. Bell, C. Norsworthy, E. Thorpe, M. Baker, T. Alexander, W. Rivers.

Venue: Hickinbotham Oval, Noarlunga Centre

=== Southern Football League 'A' Grade Grand Final 2011 ===
BRIGHTON BOMBERS 13.6 (84) defeated MORPHETT VALE 6.9 (45)

Brighton Bombers
Goal Kickers: C. Norsworthy 3, T. Rigney, L. Sharpe 2 each, T. Alexander, W. Rivers, J. Tucker, T. Johnstone, G. Phillips, J. Beugelaar 1 each
Best Players: L. Sharpe, E. Drew, M. Whitford, C. Norsworthy, W. Rivers, T. Johnstone
Morphett Vale
Goal Kickers: S. Byrne 2, K. Hewitt, S. Saunders, N. Bayly, D. Sampson 1 each
Best Players: M. Nadilo, M. Zaluski, D. Earl, B. Bayly, T. Bennetts, S. Hill
Venue: Hickinbotham Oval, Noarlunga Centre

=== Southern Football League 'A' Grade Grand Final 2010 ===
REYNELLA 13.11 (89) defeated BRIGHTON 9.5 (59)

Reynella
Goal Kickers: B.McKeough 3, A.Procter 2, E.Ware 2, S.Bradshaw, L.Ciampa, J.Carter, J.Newnham, T.Cece, S.Middleton.
Best Players: S.Bradshaw, D.Prescott, S.Prescott, E.Ware, J.Baylis, A.Broadbent
Brighton
Goal Kickers: J.Tucker 2, B.Brookman 2, W.Bradley, R.Miles, J.Degenhardt, L.Keller, B.King.
Best Players: J.Rogers, M.Whitford, B.King, R.Miles
Umpires: Aaron Bennett, David Popplewell
Attendance: 3,600
Venue: Hickinbotham Oval, Noarlunga Centre

=== Southern Football League 'A' Grade Grand Final 2009 ===
MORPHETT VALE 10.13 (73) defeated REYNELLA 5.4 (34)

Morphett Vale
Goal Kickers: S.Pollard 6, A.Rigg 1, N.Bayly 1, W.Pittman 1, M.Joraslafsky 1
Best Players: N.Bayly, J.Sampson, S.Pollard
Venue: Hickinbotham Oval, Noarlunga Centre

=== Southern Football League 'A' Grade Grand Final 2007 ===
MORPHETT VALE 11.9 (75) defeated BRIGHTON 3.6 (24)

Morphett Vale
Goal Kickers: N.Bayly 4, S.Pollard 2, T.Howell 2, S.Lock 1, M.Bode 1, M.Short 1
Best Players: M.Bode, C.Smith, B.Bayly
Venue: Hickinbotham Oval, Noarlunga Centre

=== Southern Football League 'A' Grade Grand Final 2006 ===
MORPHETT VALE 14.8 (92) defeated REYNELLA 9.6 (60)

Morphett Vale
Goal Kickers: W.Pittman 5, S.Pollard 3, M.Short 1, N.Bayly 1, B.Bayly 1, D.Earl 1, S.Hill 1, J.Kurtz 1
Best Players: M.Nadilo, B.Bayly, W.Pittman
Venue: Hickinbotham Oval, Noarlunga Centre

=== Southern Football League 'A' Grade Grand Final 2005 ===
MORPHETT VALE 16.13 (109) defeated REYNELLA 10.7 (67)

Morphett Vale
Goal Kickers: S.Pollard 3, M.Short 3, R.Beeching 3, A.Hill 2, M.Ritter 2, M.Nadilo 1, A.Landorf 1, D.Earl 1
Best Players: A.Hill, M.Zaluski, N.Mitchell
Venue: Hickinbotham Oval, Noarlunga Centre

=== Southern Football League 'A' Grade Grand Final 2004 ===
MORPHETT VALE 11.10 (76) defeated BRIGHTON 8.6 (54)

Morphett Vale
Goal Kickers: S.Pollard 6, A.Stagg 2, A.Landorf 1, C.Smith 1, M.Short 1
Best Players: S.Fishlock, M.Short, S.Pollard
Venue: Port Noarlunga Oval, Port Noarlunga

=== Southern Football Association 'A' Grade Grand Final 1952 ===
WILLUNGA 14.10 (94) defeated REYNELLA 9.8 (62)
Date: 9 September 1952
Best on Ground Trophy: Jim Walding (Willunga)
Venue: Willunga Oval, Willunga

=== Southern Football Association 'A' Grade Grand Final 1948 ===
WILLUNGA 19.11 (125) defeated McLAREN VALE 8.8 (56)

Willunga
Best Players: M. Elbourne, H. Haskett, L. Binney
Date: 4 September 1948

=== Southern Football Association 'A' Grade Grand Final 1947 ===
McLAREN FLAT 11.11 (77) defeated WILLUNGA 9.8 (62)

McLaren Flat
Goal Kickers: Robertson 4, Penny 3, Emma 2, N. Chapman, I. Chapman 1 each
Best Players: N. Chapman, D. Wylie, M. Robertson, C. Cameron
Willunga
Goal Kickers: Corbett, Hailstone, Haskett 2 each, W. Aldam, Branson, Halliday 1 each
Best Players: E. McLaughlin, W. Binney, E. Aldam, F. Gage
Date: 6 September 1947
Venue: Aldinga Oval, Aldinga
B-Grade – Willunga defeated McLaren Vale

=== Southern Football Association 'A' Grade Grand Final 1939 ===
HILLSIDE 13.10 (88) defeated WILLUNGA 8.10 (58)

Hillside
Goal Kickers: R. Townsend 5, I. Chapman 3, Holloway, R. Branson, White 2 each, S. Penney 1
Best Players: Holloway, K. Bagshaw, R. Burgan, R. Branson.
Willunga
Goal Kickers: L. Corbett 4, A. Martin, J. Branson, R. Clift, E. Aldam 1 each
Best Players: M. Corbett, R. Clift, J. Little, G. Miller.
Date: 2 September 1939

=== Southern Football Association 'A' Grade Grand Final 1937 ===
HILLSIDE 17.13 (115) defeated WILLUNGA 9.8 (62)

Hillside
Goal Kickers: R. Townsend 5, Robertson 4, K. Bagshaw, Osborne 2 each, Holloway, R. Burgean, Broughton, G. Townsend
Best Players: Penny, R. Branson, Holloway, K. Bagshaw.
Willunga
Goal Kickers: D. Atkinson, Jones 2 each, Hailstone, L. Corbett, Harris, Dyer, Giles.
Best Players: Dyer, M. Hailstone, Dowling, Blacker.
Date: 4 September 1937

=== Southern Football Association 'A' Grade Grand Final 1936 ===
WILLUNGA 11.11 (77) defeated HILLSIDE 9.15 (69)

Willunga
Goal Kickers: L. Corbett, T. Corbett 3 each, Hailstone 2, Blacker, Little, Atkinson.
Best Players: Little, M. Corbett, Hailstone, Dowling
Hillside
Goal Kickers: Ward 5, Townsend 2, Wickham, Osmond.
Best Players: K. Bagshaw, Branson, H. Bagshaw, Ward.
Date: 12 September 1936

=== Southern Football Association 'A' Grade Grand Final 1933 ===
HILLSIDE 15.12 (102) defeated WILLUNGA 4.9 (33)

Hillside
Goal Kickers: H. Bagshaw 6, H. Hobbs 5, R. Wickham 3, Ken Bagshaw 1
Best Players: Osmond, Hobbs, Keith Bradshaw, H. Bagshaw
Willunga
Goal Kickers: McKinnon 2, T. Corbett, E. Elbourne 1 each
Best Players: McKinnon, M. Corbett, J. Edwards, Dodd, G. Dyer
Venue: McLaren Vale Oval, McLaren Vale

=== Southern Football Association 'A' Grade Grand Final 1930 ===
ALDINGA 13.8 (86) defeated McLAREN VALE 9.13 (67)

Aldinga
Goal Kickers: H. Eatts 5, W. Pethick 2, C. Lovelock, L. Lovelock, K. Culley, H. Eatts, V. Branson, R. Stone 1 each
Best Players: H. Leaker, A. Scott, H. Eatts
McLaren Vale
Goal Kickers: F. Maguire 4, R. Freeman, F. Price, E. Roe, P. Roe, R. Hyde 1 each
Best Players: C. Sparrow, E. Martin, M. Harris

=== Southern Football Association 'A' Grade Challenge Final 1927 ===
ALDINGA 5.13 (43) defeated HILLSIDE 6.6 (36)

Aldinga
Best Players: Pethick, H. Gotts, C. Lovelock, L. Lovelock, Leaker, Stone
Hillside
Best Players: W. Rowe, Sauerbier, Hugo, Wickham, G. Rowe, Elliot
Date: 26 September 1927
Umpire: Mr. Hill
Best on Ground: W. Rowe (Hillside)
Venue: Willunga Oval, Willunga

=== Southern Football Association 'A' Grade Challenge Final 1920 ===
MCLAREN VALE 4.5 (29) defeated NOARLUNGA 3.9 (27)

McLaren Vale
Best Players: Waye, Waye, W. Murdoch, Samuels, S. Hyde, R. Hunt, F. Price, J. Baldock
Noarlunga
Best Players: J. Antonio, P. Furler, R. Furler, W. Furler, H. Asplin, L. Dungey
Date: 4 September 1920
Umpire: C. L. Cornish
Best on Ground: J. Antonio (Noarlunga)
Attendance: 1,000+
Venue: Willunga Oval, Willunga

=== Southern Football Association 'A' Grade Deciding Match 1908 ===
McLAREN VALE 6.11 (47) defeated WILLUNGA 4.6 (30)

McLaren Vale
Best Players: N. King, E. Wheaton, R. Oliver, the Dunstone brothers
Willunga
Best Players: S. Waye

Attendance: nearly 1,000
Venue: McLaren Vale Oval, McLaren Vale

=== Southern Football Association 'A' Grade Grand Final 1907 ===
SELLICK'S HILL 6.9 (45) defeated WILLUNGA 4.6 (30)

Umpire: Mr. Kneebone
Venue: Aldinga Oval, Aldinga

=== Southern Football Association 'A' Grade Grand Final 1895 ===
WILLUNGA 4.6 (30) defeated SELLICK’S HILL 2.5 (23)

Result protested by Sellick's Hill
Result upheld.
Venue: Aldinga Oval, Aldinga

== J. H. Warren Medal ==
The Jim Warren Medal is awarded to the play adjudged Best on Ground in a Southern Football League Division 1 Grand Final.

Year	Name	Club
1986	B. Tolman	Noarlunga
1987	Brenton Salisbury	Plympton
1988	Steve Talbot	Plympton
1989	Darren Sicheri	Plympton
1990	Trevor Smith	Morphettville Park
1991	Barry Pilmore	Noarlunga
1992	Darren Twigden	Happy Valley
1993	C. Dewhirst	Happy Valley
1994	Ashley Burt	Christies Beach
1995	D. Hodgkinson	Happy Valley
1996	Darren Twigden	Happy Valley
1997	Ryan Fitzgerald	Port Noarlunga
1998	Ben Coleman	Happy Valley
1999	Shane Sterzl	Happy Valley
2000	Craig Lallard	Marion
2001	Mark Charlton	Noarlunga
2002	Mark Jolly	Brighton District and Old Scholars
2003	Steve Young	Happy Valley
2004	Shane Fishlock	Morphett Vale
2005	A. Hill	Morphett Vale
2006	Matthew Nadilo	Morphett Vale
2007	Michael Bode	Morphett Vale
2008	Craig Heath	Cove
2009	Nathan Bayly	Morphett Vale
2010	Jason Baylis	Reynella
2011	Lincoln Sharpe	Brighton Bombers
2012	Scott McKenzie	Happy Valley
2013	Jason Farrier	Reynella
2014	Waylon Johncock	Noarlunga
2015	Luke McEntee	Reynella
2016	Michael Shearer	Flagstaff Hill
2017	Samuel Osmond	Flagstaff Hill
2018	Michael Shearer	Flagstaff Hill
2019	Mark Hollis	Flagstaff Hill
2020	David Kearsley	Flagstaff Hill
2021	Mitchell Johnson	Flagstaff Hill
2022	Cameron McGree	Reynella
2023	Sam Jacobs	Flagstaff Hill
2024	Tyler Davies	Reynella

== Leading Goalkickers ==
=== Division 1 ===
The Leading Goalkicker in the Division 1 A-Grade competition is awarded the Herb Metcalf Trophy.

Year	Player	Club	Goals	Notes
1971	G. Carter	Port Noarlunga	81	
1972	K. McCarthy	Reynella	100	
1973	M. Moffatt	Reynella	66	
1974	G. Lovelock	Port Noarlunga	50	
1975	T. Haupt	Morphett Vale	83	
1976	Neil Wuttke	McLaren Flat	70	
1977	Neil Wuttke	McLaren Flat	76	
1978	Neil Wuttke	McLaren Flat	80	
1979	Baden Taylor	Morphett Vale	128	
1980	Baden Taylor	Morphett Vale	159	
1981	Baden Taylor	Morphett Vale	106	
1982	Michael Saunders	Port Noarlunga	72	Baden Taylor (Morphett Vale) led with 75 after finals
1983	Chris Hams	Willunga	85	
1984	Chris Hams	Willunga	132	
1985	Chris Hams	Willunga	98	
1986	Russell Nunn	Noarlunga	114	
1987	Tim Pillion	Plympton	85	
1988	Kym Nadebaum	Plympton	95	Steve Talbot (Plympton) finished level with 95 after finals
1989	Brenton Ranger	Morphettville Park	84	
1990	Rod McDougall	Morphettville Park	55	level at end of minor round with 50 goals each
1990	Michael Saunders	Port Noarlunga	57	level at end of minor round with 50 goals each
1991	W. Carlin	Noarlunga	89	
1992	G. Edwards	Noarlunga	74	level at end of minor round with 72 goals each
1992	Todd Bache	Christies Beach	84	level at end of minor round with 72 goals each
1993	Rod McDougall	Morphettville Park	83	
1994	Todd Bache	Christies Beach	75	Paul Sterzl (Happy Valley) led after finals
1995	P. Benwell	Happy Valley	94	
1996	Martin Clifton	Hackham	89	
1997	Clint Godwin	Flagstaff Hill	110	
1998	Anthony Nobes	Reynella	92	
1999	Dion Hibberd	Morphettville Park	95	
2000	Ashley Burt	Port Noarlunga	106	
2001	Dion Hibberd	Noarlunga	95	
2002	Rowan Waugh	Marion	92	
2003	Dion Hibberd	Noarlunga	81	
2004	Peter Keam	Happy Valley	84	
2005	Steve Ryan	Cove	144	
2006	Travis Tedmanson	Port Noarlunga	96	
2007	Scott Pollard	Morphett Vale	124	
2008	Scott Pollard	Morphett Vale	118	Brendan McKeough (Reynella) tied with 118 after finals
2009	Scott Pollard	Morphett Vale	125	
2010	Matthew Golding	Noarlunga	110	
2011	Matthew Golding	Noarlunga	121	
2012	Samuel Smith	Flagstaff Hill	112	
2013	Josh Ramsay	Cove	70	Matthew Golding (Noarlunga) led with 71 after finals
2014	Thomas Caudle	Noarlunga	85	
2015	James McEntee	Reynella	113	
2016	Daniel Nobes	Christies Beach	109	
2017	Samuel Smith	Flagstaff Hill	79	
2018	Nicholas Mott	Noarlunga	63	
2019	Blake Carter	Christies Beach	72	
2020	Daniel Nobes	Christies Beach	50	
2021				
2022				
2023	Sam Jacobs	Flagstaff Hill	53	

=== Division 2 ===
Year	Player	Club	Goals	Notes
1978	Richie Rowe	Christies Beach C	102	
1979	D. Post	Hackham	31	
1980	R. May	Morphett Vale C	90	
1981	Doug Treloar	O'Sullivan Beach	59	
1982	R. Stupple	Kangarilla	78	
1983	G. Gore	Happy Valley	81	
1984	Kym Wilson	Meadows	98	
1985	P. Browne	Flagstaff Hill	92	
1986	S. Roberts	O'Sullivan Beach	74	
1987	N. Ricketts	Cove	47	
1988	G. Wilson	Cove	67	
1989	R. Livingston	Kangarilla	51	
1990	W. Lock	Hackham	83	
1991	T. Bishop	Aldinga	92	
1992	S. Burmeister	Mawson	69	
1993	T. Bishop	Aldinga	122	
1994	G. Lunnay	Cove	44	V. Cooper (McLaren Flat) led with 51 after finals
1995	Anthony Nobes	Aldinga	62	
1996	P. O'Loughlin	Cove	57	
1997	Malachy Ralph	O'Sullivan Beach	50	
1998	S. Hoad	Kangarilla	61	
1999	M. Clifford	McLaren	42	
2000	S. Rusby	Mitchell Park	56	
2001	J. Brett	Flagstaff Hill	102	

== Bibliography ==
- Encyclopedia of South Australian country football clubs compiled by Peter Lines. ISBN 9780980447293
- South Australian country football digest by Peter Lines ISBN 9780987159199
