= Aldinga Football Club =

Aldinga

Names
- Full name: Aldinga Football Club
- Nickname: Sharks
- Club song: "The Sharks Will Keep Rolling Along"

Club details
- Founded: 1879; 147 years ago (Note: The club was in recess from 1953 to 1976)
- Colours: (Black, Gold)
- Competition: Southern Football League
- President: Joe Walsh
- Coach: Scott Rose
- Captain: Ryder Kortman
- Ground: Shark Park (Aldinga Oval), Aldinga

Uniforms
Home

The Aldinga Football Club is an Australian rules football club that was a foundation member of the Southern Football Association in 1886. From 1927 to 1932, Aldinga won a record 6 premierships in a row in the Southern Football Association. In 1901 Aldinga was involved in a brief merger with the Sellick's Hill F.C. to form the Hills United Football Club.

The Aldinga Football Club continues to field teams in both Senior and Junior grades in the Southern Football League.

== 2014 media coverage ==
In 2014, Aldinga received significant media coverage after sacking their coach, Shane Lynch, after only two games which resulted in combined losses of 457 points, including a 300-point loss to Port Noarlunga. Following being sacked by Aldinga, Lynch was appointed coach of Mitchell Park and led them to the 2015 Channel 9 Adelaide Football League Division 7 premiership.

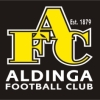
Former Aldinga FC Logo

Following the sacking of Lynch, further media coverage occurred the next weekend when a player was stung in the throat by a bee in a 254-point loss against Morphett Vale, including an appearance by the President, Danny Wilde and the bee-stung player, Ali Vessali on The Footy Show.

These stories of plight led to Australian Football Hall of Famer Graham Cornes volunteering his time to run a training session and North Adelaide coach Ken McGregor offering his time to give a pre-match "rev-up" before their next game, a 6-point loss against Marion. The Advertiser also placed their support behind running a family day during the same game with various giveaways including cow bells and a free barbecue. Further events occurred:

- Brownlow Medallist Shane Crawford led Aldinga to their first win of the season playing as a guest player against O'Sullivan Beach-Lonsdale on 24 May.
- At the same game that Shane Crawford played, Sam Newman sung the National Anthem, Billy Brownless led the cheersquad, Warwick Capper made an appearance and some coverage will be given on the following week's Footy Show.
- Port Adelaide invited Aldinga to play a curtain raiser against fellow strugglers Kilburn to be held on 12 May. This game failed to eventuate when the South Australian Amateur Football League refused to adjust its program to allow Kilburn to play.

== A-Grade Premierships ==
- Southern Football Association A-Grade (7):
  - 1927, 1928, 1929, 1930, 1931, 1932, 1934
- Southern Football League Division 2 (2):
  - 1991, 1993

== Greatest SFL Team ==
To celebrate the 125th anniversary of the Southern Football League, each club was asked to name their "Greatest Team" whilst participating in the SFL.

Aldinga Football Club's Greatest Team 1886–2010
B:	R. Eatts	C. Lovelock	H. Eatts
HB:	Clarence Pellew	C.K. (Pete) Lovelock	T. Boothby
C:	R. Bickmore	Bryce Garrard	L. Humphrey
HF:	L. Lovelock	Horace Leaker	C. Culley
F:	W. Pethick	K. Culley	M. Grandison
Foll:	W. Martin	Ben Stone (Coach)	K. Noblett
Int:	A. Foreman	D. Stone	A. Humphrey
Coach:	Ben Stone		

== Notes ==
Preceded by Noarlunga; Hillside	SFL Division 1 Premiers; 1927, 1928, 1929, 1930, 1931, 1932; 1934	Succeeded by Hillside; Hillside
Preceded by Hackham; Mawson	SFL Division 2 Premiers; 1991; 1993	Succeeded by Mawson; Meadows
