= Northern United Football Club =

Former Australian rules football club, based in South Australia

Northern United
- Full name: Northern United Football Club
- Sport: Australian Rules Football
- Founded: 1936; 90 years ago
- Folded: 1937; 89 years ago
- League: Southern Football Association

The Northern United Football Club was a shortly-lived Australian rules football club that was established in 1936 as a merger between the Noarlunga Football Club and the Morphett Vale Football Club, playing in the Southern Football Association.

Northern United were moderately successful in the 1936 season, qualifying for finals, but losing the 1st Semi-Final against eventual premiers Willunga. In the 1937 season, Northern United finished bottom, only winning one game (against McLaren Vale), and at the end of the season, the club split with Noarlunga reforming and Morphett Vale going into recess.
