= Port Noarlunga Football Club =

Port Noarlunga

Names
- Full name: Port Noarlunga Football Club
- Nickname: Cockle Divers
- Club song: "We're A Mighty Mob of Footballers"

Club details
- Founded: 1935; 91 years ago
- Colours
- Competition: Southern Football League
- President: Ryan Fitzgerald
- Coach: Men: Adam Hartlett; Women: Clint Howes
- Captain(s): Men: Nathaniel Paredes; Women: Siobhan I'Dell
- Premierships: 5: 1965, 1973, 1985, 1997, 2025
- Ground: Port Noarlunga Oval, Port Noarlunga South

Uniforms
Home	Away

Other information
- Official website: pnfc.org.au

The Port Noarlunga Football Club is an Australian rules football club first formed in 1935. Port Noarlunga initially played a four-season stint in the Glenelg District Football Association before going into recess.

A revived Port Noarlunga club joined the Southern Football Association in 1947 where they have remained since. The Port Noarlunga FC continues to field teams in Senior and Junior grades in the Southern Football League.

Port Noarlunga FC has produced three Australian Football League (AFL) players, Ryan Fitzgerald, formerly of the Adelaide and Sydney clubs, Matt Coulthard, formerly of the Richmond Football Club and Noah Howes formerly of the Collingwood Football Club.

The Port Noarlunga Football Club features several junior players representing South Australia in state football, including Archie Van Dyk, who is eligible for the AFL draft at the end of the 2026 season, alongside Zemes Pilot, Lucas Marshall, and Bailey James

On the 16th of August 2025 Bailey James made his A grade debut for Port Noarlunga at the age of 15 years and 4 months making him the youngest debutant for Port Noarlunga in their rich 90 year history.

On the 21st of November, Adam Hartlett was announced A-grade coach following Andrew Jarman's departure. Hartlett now takes the reins of a club that took out last year's SFL premiership.

Ryan Fitzgerald or 'Fitzy' on the 29th of November has been announced at the incoming President following Dan James' departure. Fitzy began at the club in his Junior years and went on to be drafted by Sydney Swans as pick 4 before being traded to the Adelaide Crows in 2002.

== A-Grade Premierships ==
- Southern FL (5)
  - 1965, 1973, 1985, 1997, 2025

== Greatest SFL Team ==
To celebrate the 125th anniversary of the Southern Football League, each club was asked to name their "Greatest Team" whilst participating in the SFL.

Port Noarlunga Football Club's Greatest Team 1947-2010
B:	Paul Sparre	Travis Tedmanson	Stewart Dyson
HB:	Nick Manhood	Chris Veide	Dennis Osborn
C:	Gary Beasley	Gary Davenport	Paul Vaughan
HF:	Phil McKay	Ryan Fitzgerald	Brett Mannion
F:	Doug Modra	Michael Saunders	Ashley Burt
Foll:	Bernie Veide	Mick Fitzgerald	Roger Rigney
Int:	John Goldfinch	Noel Hill	Luke Berry
Coach:	Mick Fitzgerald		

Preceded by Willunga; Christies Beach; Willunga; Happy Valley; Reynella	SFL Division 1 Premiers; 1965; 1973; 1985; 1997; 2025	Succeeded by McLaren Flat; Christies Beach; Noarlunga; Happy Valley
