= Christies Beach Football Club =

Australian rules football team based in Adelaide

Christies Beach

Names
- Full name: Christies Beach Football Club
- Nickname: Saints
- Club song: "When the Saints Go Marching In"

Club details
- Founded: 1963; 63 years ago
- Colours: red white black
- Competition: Southern Football League
- President: Justin Butcher, Phil Staveley & Matthew Wise
- Coach: Brian Haraida (Men), Rick Wheatley (Women)
- Captain(s): Michael Mazey & Mackenzie Nield (Men), Madison Marsh (Women)
- Premierships: A Grade (7): 1967, 1968, 1971, 1972, 1974, 1983, 1994; Women (1): 2017
- Ground: John Bice Memorial Oval

Uniforms
Home	Away

Other information
- Official website: cbfcsaints.org

The Christies Beach Football Club is an Australian rules football team based in the outer southern suburbs of Adelaide that first fielded junior teams in the Southern Football League in 1964. In 1966 senior teams were formed and almost instant success was achieved with A-Grade premierships in 1967 and 1968. The Christies Beach Football Club continues to field teams in both Senior and Junior grades in the Southern Football League. Between 2016 and 2019, Christies Beach fielded Women's teams in the Adelaide Footy League (previously South Australian Women's Football League).

Christies Beach has produced a number of Australian Football League (AFL) players including Jason Horne-Francis (North Melbourne/Port Adelaide), Dean Brogan (Port Adelaide/GWS), Nigel Smart (Adelaide), Tony Modra (Adelaide/Fremantle), and Chris Groom (Adelaide/Fremantle/North Melbourne).

== A-Grade Premierships ==
1967 SFL A-Grade
1968 SFL A-Grade
1971 SFL A-Grade Undefeated
1972 SFL A-Grade
1974 SFL A-Grade
1983 SFL Division 1
1994 SFL Division 1

== Women's Premierships ==
2017 Adelaide Footy League Women Division 2

== Greatest SFL Team ==
To celebrate the 125th anniversary of the Southern Football League, each club was asked to name their "Greatest Team" whilst participating in the SFL.

Christies Beach Football Club's Greatest Team 1966-2010
B:	Darren Mason Vice-Captain	Michael Moroney	R. (Bob) Butcher
HB:	Peter George AM	Fenwick Thompson	John Goldfinch
C:	Paul Crate	W. (Bill) Herron Captain	Craig Thompson
HF:	Ken Applegarth	Kym Nadebaum	John Hall OAM
F:	Ian Winton	Robert Hunt	Brian McLeod
Foll:	Jim Gulliver	Allan Fox	Frank Howard
Int:	Julian Andruszkiewicz	Andrew Nation	Luke Berry
Coach:	Brian Thredgold		

Preceded by McLaren Flat; Noarlunga; Port Noarlunga; Noarlunga; Happy Valley	SFL Division 1 Premiers; 1967, 1968; 1971, 1972; 1974; 1983; 1994	Succeeded by Reynella; Port Noarlunga; Reynella; Willunga; Happy Valley
