= Flagstaff Hill Football Club =

Flagstaff Hill

Names
- Full name: Flagstaff Hill Football Club
- Nickname: Falcons
- Club song: "It's a Grand Old Flag (We’re a strong, fast team)"

Club details
- Founded: 1963; 63 years ago
- Colours: (Navy blue, Red)
- Competition: Southern Football League
- President: David Heard
- Coach: Russell Veenvliet
- Ground: Flagstaff Oval

Uniforms
Home

Other information
- Official website: fhfc.com.au

The Flagstaff Hill Football Club (also known as the Flagstaff Hill Falcons) is an Australian rules football club originally formed as Brighton Methodist Football Club based at Mitchell Park in 1963 in the former United Churches Football League. In 1975, Brighton Methodist FC shifted to Mawson High School Oval and in 1977 was renamed the Brighton Tigers Football Club. In 1978 Brighton Tigers FC joined the Glenelg South Football Association and the following year was renamed to Flagstaff Hill Football Club.

== History ==
Flagstaff Hill joined the Southern Football League Division 2 competition in 1985 having immediate success with an undefeated premiership and being promoted to Division 1. Flagstaff Hill remained in Division 1 before getting relegated to Division 2 at the end of 1999. They returned to the combined Division 1 in 2002.

The Flagstaff Hill Football Club continues to field teams in both Senior and Junior grades in the Southern Football League.

Flagstaff Hill FC has produced a number of Australian Football League (AFL) players including Brownlow Medallist Adam Cooney (Western Bulldogs, Essendon), Danny Meyer (Richmond, Port Adelaide), Ben Marsh (Richmond, Adelaide) and Josh Bruce (Greater Western Sydney, St Kilda, Western Bulldogs).

Flagstaff Hill was the 2016, 2017, 2018, 2019 SFL Champion Club of the Year.

== A-Grade Premierships ==
- United Church FA (1)
  - 1974 (as Brighton Methodist)
- Southern FL (8)
  - 1985 (D2)*, 2016, 2017, 2018, 2019, 2020*, 2021*, 2023*

* (Undefeated)

Preceded by Flagstaff Hill	SFL A-Grade Premiers; 2018	Succeeded by current

Preceded by Meadows	SFL Division 2 Premiers; 1985	Succeeded by O'Sullivan Beach
