= Hackham Football Club =

Hackham

Names
- Full name: Hackham Football Club
- Nickname: Hawks

Club details
- Founded: 1976; 50 years ago
- Colours: Brown, Gold
- Competition: Adelaide Footy League
- President: Glenn Draper
- Coach: Wade Francis
- Captain: Jacob Doherty
- Ground: Hackham Oval, Holly Reserve (capacity: 20,000)

Uniforms
Home

Other information
- Official website: HackamHawks

The Hackham Football Club is an Australian rules football club first formed in 1976. In 1977, Hackham initially started in the Southern Football League Division 3 competition playing against C-Grade teams of some of the stronger clubs before becoming an inaugural member of the restructured Division 2 competition in 1978. Promotion to Division 1 was achieved in 1984, but its first attempt at the top division did not last long, dropping back down to the second division at the end of the 1986 season. Hackham once again were promoted to Division 1 in 1992 and remained within that division until 2016, dropping to the C-Grade competition from 2017 (their senior team was also dropped to this grade for a single year in 2004).

In an effort to reimage following the failure to field an A-Grade and B-Grade team, the club rebranded itself the Southern Hawks Football Club in 2005; this was short-lived however, reverting to the traditional Hackham name in the 2007 season.

In 2021 Hackham's senior grades exited the SFL and joined the Adelaide Footy League in the league's Division 7 competition

The Hackham FC continues to field teams in Women grades, and Junior grades in the Southern Football League.

Hackham FC has produced one Australian Football League (AFL) player, Chris Hall, formerly of Port Adelaide.

== A-Grade Premierships ==
- 1990 Southern Football League (Division 2)

== Reserves and C-Grade Premierships ==
- 1990 Southern Football League B-Grade (Division 2)
- 1991 Southern Football League B-Grade (Division 2) Undefeated
- 1996 Southern Football League B-Grade (Division 1)
- 2019 Southern Football League C-Grade (Division 3) Undefeated
- 2020 Southern Football League C-Grade (Division 3)

Preceded by McLaren Flat	SFL Division 2 Premiers; 1990	Succeeded by Aldinga
