= Matthew Golding (footballer) =

Australian rules footballer

Personal information
- Full name: Matthew Golding
- Born: 30 December 1980 (age 45)
- Original team: Glenelg (SANFL)
- Height: 196 cm (6 ft 5 in)
- Weight: 103 kg (227 lb)

Playing career^{1}
Years	Club	Games (Goals)
1999	Adelaide	7 (0)
- ^{1} Playing statistics correct to the end of 1999.

Matthew Golding (born 30 December 1980) is a former Australian rules footballer who played with Adelaide in the Australian Football League (AFL).

Golding played his junior football with Southern Football League club Reynella before moving to South Australian National Football League (SANFL) club Glenelg.

Drafted by Adelaide at number 43 in the 1999 AFL rookie draft, Golding made his AFL debut in 1999. After delisting him at the end of 2000, Adelaide redrafted Golding at the 2001 rookie draft.

Golding was delisted by Adelaide without playing any further games and continued his career at Glenelg, playing 96 games to the end of the 2004 SANFL season. He crossed to Edwardstown in the South Australian Amateur Football League (SAAFL) in 2005 before moving to the Southern Football League's Noarlunga in 2010.
