= Beau McCreery =

Australian rules footballer

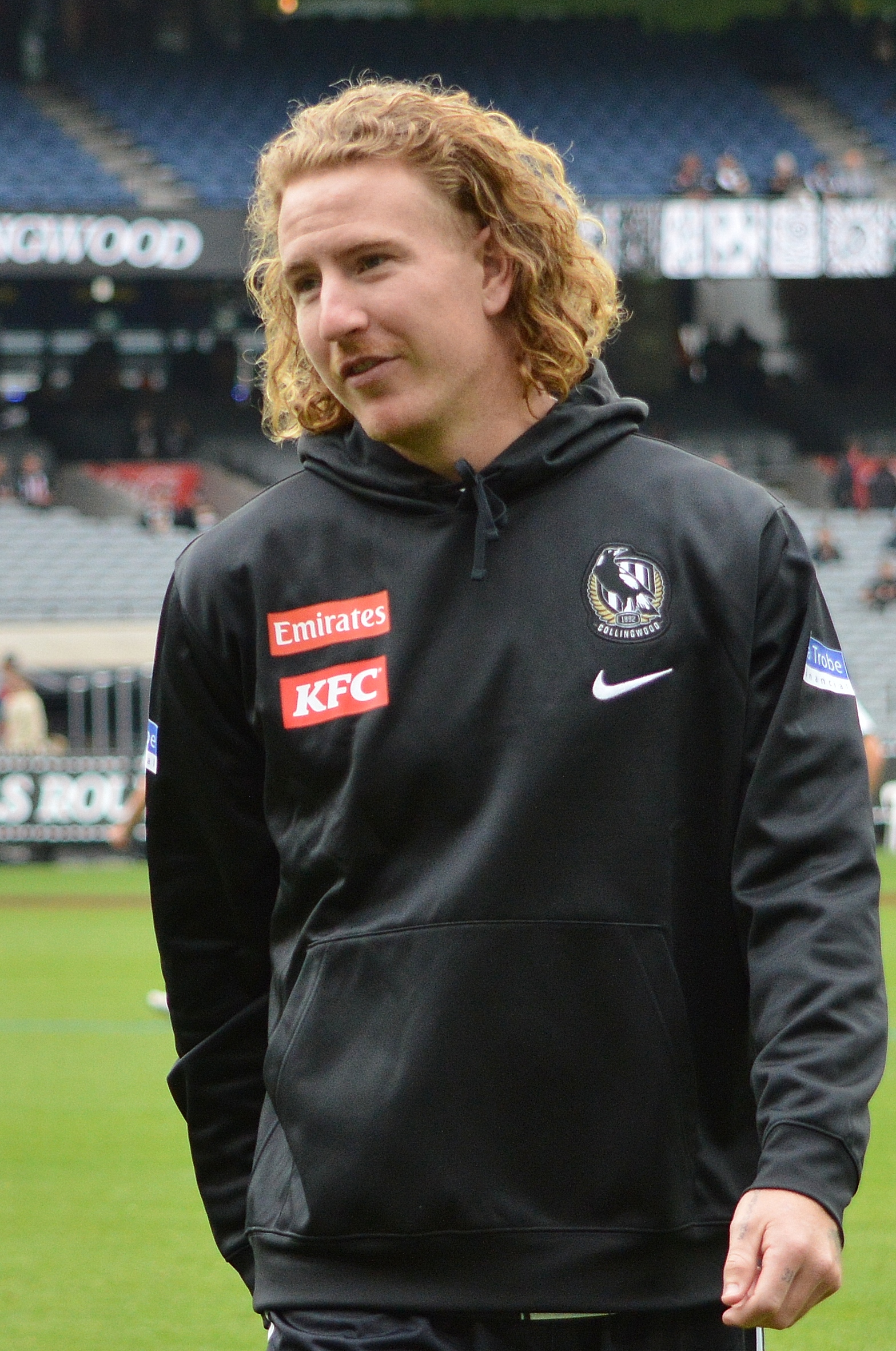
- McCreery in May 2025

Personal information
- Full name: Beau McCreery
- Born: 19 April 2001 (age 25); South Australia
- Original team: South Adelaide (SANFL)/Cove
- Draft: No. 44, 2020 national draft
- Debut: Round 3, 2021, Collingwood vs. Brisbane Lions, at Marvel Stadium
- Height: 186 cm (6 ft 1 in)
- Weight: 86 kg (190 lb)
- Position: Forward

Club information
- Current club: Collingwood
- Number: 31

Playing career^{1}
Years	Club	Games (Goals)
2021–	Collingwood	119 (71)
- ^{1} Playing statistics correct to the end of the 2026 season.

Career highlights
- AFL premiership player: 2023

Beau McCreery (born 19 April 2001) is an Australian rules footballer playing for the Collingwood Football Club in the Australian Football League (AFL).

== State football ==
McCreery began playing football at under-8 level with Southern Football League club Cove, where he played for 10 years before being invited to try out for South Australia National Football League (SANFL) club South Adelaide. He played for South Australia's junior side in the Torrens University Cup, being nominated for the most valuable player (MVP) award in round 1, after kicking seven goals and laying 11 tackles in their victory over Central District. He debuted for South Adelaide's senior side against Woodville-West Torrens at Adelaide Oval in June 2020. He kicked two goals on debut, including the match-winner. Later in the season, he performed consistently, kicking goals in all of the games in his first season apart from three.

== AFL career ==
McCreery was drafted by Collingwood with their last pick of the 2020 national draft, which was the 44th pick overall. He made his official debut against Brisbane Lions in the third round of the 2021 AFL season as a medical sub. After not taking part in the game, he took part for the first time the following week, against Greater Western Sydney, scoring a goal in the opening minutes of the match with his first kick. He also applied pressure, laying eight tackles, with seven of them inside-50.

== Personal life ==
McCreery worked as a carpenter while still at school. After finishing school, he worked as a carpenter full time while playing for South Adelaide. He grew up a Port Adelaide fan. He attended school at Cardijn College in Noarlunga Downs.

== Statistics ==
Updated to the end of round 22, 2026.

Legend
G	Goals	K	Kicks	D	Disposals	T	Tackles
B	Behinds	H	Handballs	M	Marks
#	Played in that season's premiership team

Season	Team	No.	Games	Totals							Averages (per game)							Votes
Season	Team	No.	Games	G	B	K	H	D	M	T	G	B	K	H	D	M	T	Votes
2021	Collingwood	31	13	11	6	52	30	82	24	43	0.8	0.5	4.0	2.3	6.3	1.8	3.3	0
2022	Collingwood	31	22	14	11	115	89	204	34	86	0.6	0.5	5.2	4.0	9.3	1.5	3.9	0
2023^{#}	Collingwood	31	25	17	12	170	84	254	67	96	0.7	0.5	6.8	3.4	10.2	2.7	3.8	0
2024	Collingwood	31	17	10	10	107	66	173	28	84	0.6	0.6	6.3	3.9	10.2	1.6	4.9	1
2025	Collingwood	31	19	6	6	131	83	214	40	83	0.3	0.3	6.9	4.4	11.3	2.1	4.4	0
2026	Collingwood	31	20	12	7	141	130	271	45	93	0.6	0.4	7.1	6.5	13.6	2.3	4.7	0
Career			116	70	52	716	482	1198	238	485	0.6	0.4	6.2	4.2	10.3	2.1	4.2	1
