= Noarlunga Football Club =

Noarlunga

Names
- Full name: Noarlunga Football Club
- Nickname: Shoes
- Club song: "Up The Shoes"
- After finals: Runners Up
- Home-and-away season: 12W 3L
- Leading goalkicker: Brad Inglis
- Best and fairest: Nick Mott

Club details
- Founded: 1897; 129 years ago
- Colours
- Competition: Southern Football League
- President: Bill Sheean
- Coach: Shane Comer
- Captain: TBA
- Premierships: 11
- Ground: Old Noarlunga Oval

Uniforms
Home

The Noarlunga Football Club is an Australian rules football club that plays in the Southern Football League.

== History ==
There are some records of a Noarlunga Football Club being first formed in the 1890s. The first record of Noarlunga participating in an organised competition was with the establishment of the Alexandra Football Association in 1913, with Noarlunga finishing runners-up to Clarendon that season. The following season Noarlunga went one better, winning the Alexandra FA Premiership.

Noarlunga transferred to the Southern Football Association in 1915, but this move lasted only one season due to the competition disbanding the following year due to the First World War. Noarlunga returned to the re-established Southern FA in 1919, starting a golden period of the club, winning Premierships in 1921, 1922, 1925 & 1926.

In 1936, Noarlunga merged with the Morphett Vale Football Club to form the Northern United Football Club. Noarlunga reformed as a standalone team in 1938 before going into recess the following season.

Noarlunga eventually reformed in 1951 and rejoined the Southern Football Association, where they have remained since. The Noarlunga FC continues to field teams in Senior and Junior grades in the Southern Football League.

Due to a lack of players, Noarlunga will not field a side in the 2026 Southern Football League 'A-Grade' competition.

== A-Grade Premierships ==
- Alexandra FA (1)
  - 1914
- Southern FA (4)
  - 1921, 1922, 1925, 1926
- Southern FL (6)
  - 1970, 1982, 1986, 1991, 2001, 2014

== See also ==
- Noarlunga (disambiguation)

Preceded by McLaren Vale; McLaren Vale; Port Noarlunga; Morphett Vale; Happy Valley; Morphettville Park; Marion; Reynella	SFL Division 1 Premiers; 1921, 1922; 1925, 1926; 1970; 1982; 1986; 1991; 2000; 2014	Succeeded by Willunga; Aldinga; Christies Beach; Christies Beach; Plympton; Happy Valley; Brighton District and Old Scholars; Reynella
