= Cove Football Club =

Australian rules football club

Cove

Names
- Full name: Cove Football Club
- Nickname: Cobras
- Club song: "Cheers the Boys From Cove"

Club details
- Founded: 1984; 42 years ago
- Colours
- Competition: Southern Football League
- Ground: Hallett Cove Oval, Hallett Cove

Uniforms
Home

The Cove Football Club is an Australian rules football club that was formed in 1983 and later joined the Southern Football League in 1984. From 1984 to 2001, Cove played in the SFL Division 2 competition before joining the combined Division 1 in 2002.

The Cove Football Club continues to field teams in both Senior and Junior grades in the Southern Football League.

== History ==
The Cove Football Club was established in 1984 to cater the communities of Hallett Cove, Sheidow Park and Trott Park by a group of locals despite only planning a club around the early stages of building an oval. The first two seasons saw the newly formed club play as an 'away' team for each ground as they didn't have a secure oval and changerooms yet, with the players training at Morphett Vale. Early 1986 saw the completion of the ground and Cove having their own home ground.

The club has enjoyed a number of success throughout the senior and junior grades, with two A-Grade premierships in 1998 in Division 2 and again in 2008 in Division 1. 2013 saw founding club president Chris Galley's induction into the Southern Football League 'Hall of Fame.'

== A-Grade Premierships ==
1998 SFL Division 2
2008 SFL A-Grade

== Greatest SFL Team ==
To celebrate the 125th anniversary of the Southern Football League, each club was asked to name their "Greatest Team" whilst participating in the SFL.

Cove Football Club's Greatest Team 1984-2010
B:	Craig Heath	Andrew Platten	Marty Stewart
HB:	Gordon Slattery	Luke Weidemann	Kym Ursino
C:	Greg Lang	Brady Scott	Matthew Reavill
HF:	Dale Champion	Josh Ramsay Captain	Anthony Farrugia
F:	Sam Craft	Steve Ryan	Phil Pippett
Foll:	Scott Gill	Craig Bevan	Josh Vick
Int:	Colin Hancock	Phil Larner	Derek Reavill
Int:	Ron Pippett	Allan Hough	Shane Comer
Coach:	Greg Anderson		

Preceded by Morphett Vale	SFL Division 1 Premiers; 2008	Succeeded by Morphett Vale
Preceded by O'Sullivan Beach	SFL Division 2 Premiers; 1998	Succeeded by Kangarilla
