= Morphett Vale Football Club =

Morphett Vale

Names
- Full name: Morphett Vale Football Club
- Nickname: Emus
- Club song: "It's a Grand Old Flag"

2018 season
- After finals: ?

Club details
- Founded: 1895; 131 years ago
- Colours: Black, Red
- Competition: SFL
- President: Paul Hayford
- Coach: Wade Foggo
- Ground: Morphett Vale Memorial Oval, Morphett Vale

Uniforms
Home

The Morphett Vale Football Club is an Australian rules football club first formed in 1895. From 1896 to 1898 there are some records of Morphett Vale playing regular games against teams from the southern metropolitan area of Adelaide, but it is not known if this was part of a formal competition.

== History ==
In 1899, Morphett Vale joined the Southern Football Association and remained as a participant in this competition until the end of the 1913 season. In 1914, Morphett Vale transferred to the Alexandra Football Association for one season, before returning to the Southern Football Association the following year. This return only lasted for one season as Morphett Vale went into recess due to the First World War. Morphett Vale did not reform until 1924 when they re-entered the Southern Football Association, going the entire season winless and once again going into recess. They reformed in 1928, again with little success when they proceeded through both the 1928 and 1929 seasons without a win. Morphett Vale withdrew from the Southern Association for the 1930 season.

Morphett Vale reformed once again for the 1935 season and their Round 1 win against Clarendon was their first win in 21 years. They would go on to win a further two games that year against Noarlunga and again Clarendon. In 1936, Morphett Vale merged with the Noarlunga Football Club to form the Northern United Football Club. At the end of the 1937 season, the Northern United club split with Noarlunga reforming and Morphett Vale going into recess again.

After the Second World War, Morphett Vale reformed for the 1946 season, lasting until the 1951 season before going into recess again. In 1953, Morphett Vale were re-admitted to the Southern Football Association but only lasted the one season before going into recess again.

Morphett Vale FC reformed once again in 1963, returning to the Southern Association where they have remained ever since. The Morphett Vale FC continues to field teams in Senior and Junior grades in the Southern Football League.

Morphett Vale FC has produced a number of Australian Football League (AFL) players including Rod Jameson (Adelaide), Clay Sampson (Melbourne, Adelaide) and Jason Torney (Richmond, Adelaide).

== A-Grade Premierships ==
1978 Southern Football League Division 1
1979 Southern Football League Division 1
1980 Southern Football League Division 1
1981 Southern Football League Division 1
2004 Southern Football League A-Grade
2005 Southern Football League A-Grade
2006 Southern Football League A-Grade
2007 Southern Football League A-Grade Undefeated
2009 Southern Football League A-Grade

== Greatest SFL Team ==
To celebrate the 125th anniversary of the Southern Football League, each club was asked to name their "Greatest Team" whilst participating in the SFL.

Morphett Vale Football Club's Greatest Team 1898-2010
B:	Chris Dibley	Craig Smith	Dylan Sampson
HB:	Simon Robinson	Garrett Vandersteldt	Jason Gaskin
C:	Daniel Earl	Dean Moore	Gavin Steel
HF:	Steven Newman	Reid Beeching	Nathan Bayly
F:	Baden Taylor	Graham Gunn	Scott Pollard
Foll:	Martin Short	Alan Twigden	Shane Fishlock
Int:	Reg Pollard	Braden Bayly	Matthew Joraslafsky
Coach:	Geoff Sulley		

== Controversy ==
On 4 August 1910, former club secretary Charles Grundy was sentenced to three months imprisonment after being found guilty of fraudulent misappropriation of the funds of the club. The 20 year old was accused of taking £4 for his personal use and had his sentence suspended on agreement to return the funds to the club.

Preceded by Reynella; Happy Valley; Cove	SFL Division 1 Premiers; 1978, 1979, 1980, 1981; 2004, 2005, 2006, 2007; 2009	Succeeded by Noarlunga; Cove; Reynella
