= Reynella Football Club =

Reynella

Names
- Full name: Reynella Football Club
- Nickname: Wineflies

Club details
- Founded: 1896; 130 years ago
- Colours
- Competition: SFL
- President: Sis Inthavong
- Coach: Brendan Mckeough
- Captain: Tyler Davies
- Ground: Reynella Oval

Uniforms
Home

Other information
- Official website: reynellafc.com.au

The Reynella Football Club is an Australian rules football club first formed on 18 April 1896. Reynella first joined an organised competition in 1914, the Mid-Southern Football Association, playing in that competition until the end of 1918. In 1919, Reynella joined the Southern Football Association for the first time, but only lasted one season before returning to the Mid-Southern Association.

In 1928, Reynella merged with the Morphett Vale Football Club and joined the Southern Football Association. This combination split at the end of the 1929 season and Reynella returned to the Mid-Southern Association.

Reynella remained in the Mid-Southern Association, later the Glenelg District Football Association, until the end of the 1947 season. Reynella joined the Southern Football Association in 1948 where they have remained ever since. The Reynella FC continues to field teams in Senior and Junior grades in the Southern Football League. In 2018 Reynella introduced its first female teams in the inaugural SFL female competition and in 2023, Reynella FC won its first A-Grade Women's premiership in the Southern Football League.

Reynella FC has produced a number of Australian Football League (AFL/VFL) players including Michael Doughty (Adelaide), Ben Moore (Richmond), Darren Kappler (Fitzroy, Hawthorn, Sydney), Andrew Brockhurst (Fitzroy), Brenton Harris (North Melbourne), Darren Harris (North Melbourne), Matthew Golding (Adelaide), Justin Bollenhagen (Fremantle), Cory Gregson (Geelong), Sam Draper (Essendon), Jack Delean (Fremantle).

== A-Grade Men's Premierships ==
- 1969 Southern Football League A-Grade
- 1975 Southern Football League A-Grade
- 1977 Southern Football League A-Grade
- 2010 Southern Football League A-Grade
- 2013 Southern Football League A-Grade
- 2015 Southern Football League A-Grade
- 2022 Southern Football League A-Grade
- 2024 Southern Football League A-Grade

== A-Grade Women's Premierships ==
- 2023 Southern Football League A-Grade Women

| Preceded by Christies Beach; Christies Beach; McLaren Flat; Morphett Vale; Happy Valley; Noarlunga; Flagstaff Hill; Flagstaff Hill | SFL Division 1 Premiers; 1969; 1975; 1977; 2010; 2013; 2015; 2022; 2024 | Succeeded by Noarlunga; McLaren Flat; Morphett Vale; Brighton District and Old Scholars; Noarlunga; Flagstaff Hill |
