= Happy Valley Football Club =

Happy Valley

Names
- Full name: Happy Valley Football Club
- Nickname: Vikings
- Club song: "I Want To Be A Valley Viking"

2025 season
- After finals: Runners Up
- Home-and-away season: 1st

Club details
- Founded: 1952; 74 years ago
- Colours: Black, Gold
- Competition: Southern Football League
- President: Tammy Ingleton
- Coach: Andrew Cook
- Captain: Harry Spacie
- Premierships: 10 (1970, 1974, 1992, 1993, 1995, 1996, 1998, 1999, 2003, 2012)
- Ground: Happy Valley Oval, Aberfoyle Park

Uniforms
Home

Other information
- Official website: hvfc.com.au

The Happy Valley Football Club is an Australian rules football club that competes in the Southern Football League.

== History ==
The club first formed in 1952 playing in the former Hills Central Football League. In 1964, Happy Valley transferred to the Glenelg-South-West District Football Association (GSWFA) and adopted the colours Black and Gold to avoid a clash with the Glandore club (having previously worn Blue and Gold).

In 1980, Happy Valley joined the Southern Football League (SFL) Division 2 competition and in 1984 were promoted to Division 1. Since joining Division 1, Happy Valley have been a very successful club, winning 8 A-Grade Premierships.

The Happy Valley FC continues to field teams in Senior and Junior grades in the SFL and Senior women's teams in the Adelaide Football League.

Happy Valley FC has produced a number of Australian Football League (AFL) players including Ben Rutten (Adelaide), Nathan Eagleton (Western Bulldogs, Port Adelaide), Jason Porplyzia (Adelaide), Beau Waters (West Coast), Matthew Rogers (Richmond), Tom McNamara (Melbourne) and Brayden Cook (Adelaide).

== Early References ==
- There are records of a Happy Valley Football Club playing against southern suburban teams in 1895.
- In 1914, Happy Valley Football Club applied to join the Alexandra Football Association but were rejected as it would "necessitate too much travelling". Morphett Vale and McLaren Vale were accepted instead.

== Greatest SFL Team ==
To celebrate the 125th anniversary of the Southern Football League, each club was asked to name their "Greatest Team" whilst participating in the SFL.

Happy Valley Football Club's Greatest Team 1980-2010
| B: | Mel Patterson | Steven Beagley | Peter Ellis |
| HB: | Scott McKenzie | Darren Twigden | Nathan Gill (c) |
| C: | Michael Cook | Barry Love | Ben Coleman |
| HF: | Steven Young | Shane Sterzl | Peter McWilliams |
| F: | Peter Keam | Phil Benwell | Michael Mahar |
| Foll: | Alex Saundry (vc) | Linc Rogers | Darrin Spinks |
| Int: | Peter Duffield | Peter Willoughby | Jarrad Pomeroy |
| Coach: | Brenton Honor | | |

== A-Grade Premierships ==
- Glenelg-South Adelaide FA (2)
  - 1970 (D3), 1974 (D3)
- Southern FL (8)
  - 1992, 1993, 1995, 1996, 1998, 1999, 2003, 2012

| Preceded by Noarlunga; Christies Beach; Port Noarlunga; Brighton District and Old Scholars; Brighton District and Old Scholars | SFL Division 1 Premiers; 1992, 1993; 1995, 1996; 1998, 1999; 2003; 1994 | Succeeded by Christies Beach; Port Noarlunga; Marion; Morphett Vale; Reynella |
