= Mount Bold Football Club =

Mount Bold
- Full name: Mount Bold Football Club
- Sport: Australian Rules Football
- Founded: 1962
- Dissolved: 1965
- League: Southern Football League
- Home ground: Kangarilla Oval, Yaroona
- Colours: Green, Red

The Mount Bold Football Club was a shortly-lived Australian rules football club that was established in 1962 as a merger between the Kangarilla Football Club and the Clarendon Football Club, initially playing in the Hills Central Football Association.

In 1964, Mount Bold transferred to the Southern Football League. In the 1964 and 1965 seasons, Mount Bold failed to qualify for finals and disbanded at the end of the 1965 season with Kangarilla reforming. Clarendon never re-established.
