= Nathan Eagleton =

Australian rules footballer

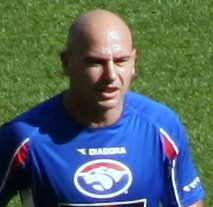
- Nathan Eagleton

Personal information
- Born: 10 November 1978 (age 47)
- Original team: West Adelaide (SANFL)
- Debut: Round 5, 1997 AFL season, Port Adelaide vs. Brisbane Lions, at Football Park
- Height: 180 cm (5 ft 11 in)
- Weight: 84 kg (185 lb)

Playing career^{1}
Years	Club	Games (Goals)
1997–1999	Port Adelaide	56 (45)
2000–2010	Western Bulldogs	221 (186)
Total		277 (231)
- ^{1} Playing statistics correct to the end of 2010.

Career highlights
- AFL Rising Star nominee: 1997

Nathan Eagleton (born 10 November 1978) is a former professional Australian rules footballer who played for the Port Adelaide Football Club and the Western Bulldogs in the Australian Football League (AFL).

Eagleton played junior level football for West Adelaide in the South Australian National Football League (SANFL). He was recruited as a zone selection by Port Adelaide for its inaugural AFL season in 1997. He played his first game for Port Adelaide in 1997 against Brisbane in round 5, 1997. In a match in 1999, he collapsed on field, and was diagnosed and treated for Wolff-Parkinson-White syndrome.

Eagleton was traded to the Western Bulldogs in 2000, in exchange for Brett Montgomery and a second-round draft pick. He got off to a slow start but was a key player for the Bulldogs in 2004 and 2005.

Known as "The Bald Eagle" for his clean-shaven head and surname, in 2005 Eagleton was an important player for the Western Bulldogs with his skill and run proving vital to the team's late-season charge. He kicked a career-best 28 goals in 2005. He is recognised as having a long and raking left foot kick, regularly kicking goals from outside the 50m line.

Eagleton retired from the AFL at the end of the 2010 season. He was the final player from Port Adelaide's inaugural season to still be playing in the AFL, following Warren Tredrea's retirement due to injury earlier that year. He returned to South Australia and played with SANFL club Norwood for one season in 2011, before announcing his retirement from the sport in April 2012. Briefly returning to the sport to see out the end of the 2012 Southern Football League season, Eagleton rejoined the Happy Valley Football Club to play alongside his three brothers, Jonathan, Damien and Michael, and went on to win the competition with them. This marked his first premiership at any level.

Eagleton played in guernsey numbers 25 and 11 with Port Adelaide and number 10 with the Bulldogs. He is married with two children.
