= McLaren Football Club =

Australian rules football club formed in 1998

McLaren

Names
- Full name: McLaren Football Club
- Nickname: Eagles

Club details
- Founded: 1998; 28 years ago
- Colours
- Competition: GSFL
- President: Darren Lines
- Coach: Gianni Petrucci
- Ground: McLaren Vale Oval, McLaren Vale

Uniforms
Home

Other information
- Official website: mclaren.com.au

The McLaren Football Club is an Australian rules football club formed in 1998 as a merger of the McLaren Flat Football Club, McLaren Vale Football Club and McLaren Districts Junior Football Club.

McLaren started in the Southern Football League Division 2 competition where its predecessor clubs had participated in the previous season. McLaren only remained until the end of the 2000 season, when they transferred to the Great Southern Football League.

McLaren continue to field Senior and Junior teams in the Great Southern Football League. In 2018 it will field its first Women's teams.

== Anthem ==
"Fly the Mighty Eagles fly the flag real high. reach and grab the football hear the crowd go wild. When you hear us play you'll know were here to stay we'll beat you on the ground and run you out of town.
Fly the mighty eagles fly the flag real high. Reach and grab the football hear the crowd go wild. We just won again so don't forget our name, we are the mighty McLaren Football Club".

== A-Grade Premierships ==
- Great Southern Football League A-Grade (4)
  - 2003, 2022, 2023, 2026
