= Hendrick Waye =

Australian rules footballer

Taffy Waye

Personal information
- Full name: Hendrick Stanbury Waye
- Born: 13 December 1877; Willunga, South Australia
- Died: 7 July 1961 (aged 83)
- Original team: Willunga
- Positions: Forward, ruck

Playing career^{1}
Years	Club	Games (Goals)
1902–1910	Sturt	71 (75)
- ^{1} Playing statistics correct to the end of 1910.

Hendrick Stanbury "Taffy" Waye (13 December 1877 – 7 July 1961) was an Australian rules footballer who played with Sturt in the South Australian Football Association (SAFA) during the early 1900s.

Waye played a total of 71 games for Sturt from his debut in 1902 to his last season in 1910. Strong around the ruck and in front of goal, Waye won the Magarey Medal in 1903. He also topped his club's goalkicking five times during his career. At interstate level he represented South Australia regularly, appearing in a total of eight games. He occupies a forward pocket in Sturt's official "Team of the Century".

On 14 August 2011, Waye was selected in the Southern Football League's 125th anniversary team in the forward pocket and second ruck due to his service for the Willunga Football Club. Waye was the only player selected in both the SFL's Greatest Team and Greatest Exports Team.

Taffy Waye was known to ride 25 miles on horseback from Willunga to Unley to train and play for Sturt in 1903, regularly filling in for Willunga between league games at Sturt.

On 26 July 2015, Taffy Waye was inducted into the Southern Football League Hall of Fame in recognition of his service as a player within that league.
