= Lonsdale Football Club =

Australian rules football club, 1979–2001

Lonsdale
- Full name: Lonsdale Football Club
- Nickname: Bears
- Sport: Australian Rules Football
- Founded: 1979
- Folded: 2001 (merged)
- League: Southern Football League
- Home ground: Morphett Vale High School Oval, Morphett Vale
- Colours: Yellow, Green

The Lonsdale Football Club was an Australian rules football club originally formed in 1979 as the Mawson Football Club, competing in the Southern Football League Division 2 competition.

Mawson were promoted to the SFL Division 1 competition for one season in 1988 before returning to the Division 2 competition the following season. Mawson changed its name to the Lonsdale Football Club in 1996 and won the last Division 2 premiership in 2001 before merging with the O’Sullivan Beach Football Club to form the O'Sullivan Beach-Lonsdale Football Club for the following season.

== A-Grade Premierships ==
- Southern Football League Division 2 (2)
  - 1992, 2001
