= O'Sullivan Beach Football Club =

Australian rules football club

O’Sullivan Beach
- Full name: O’Sullivan Beach Football Club
- Nickname: Lions
- Sport: Australian Rules Football
- Founded: 1977
- Folded: 2001 (merged)
- League: Southern Football League
- Home ground: O’Sullivan Beach Oval, O’Sullivan Beach
- Colours: Maroon, White

The O’Sullivan Beach Football Club was an Australian rules football club originally formed in 1977, initially just as an U/13 team in the Southern Football League, gradually building up their teams over the following years. In 1981 they fielded their first senior team, in the Southern Football League Division 2 Reserves competition, and in the following season entered the Division 2 A-Grade competition.

O’Sullivan Beach were promoted to the SFL Division 1 competition for the first time in 1987, but dropped to Division 2 after two seasons. Promotion was achieved again for the 1998 season, but dropped again at the end of the 1999 season after finishing bottom both seasons.

O’Sullivan Beach merged with the Lonsdale Football Club at the end of the 2001 to form the O'Sullivan Beach-Lonsdale Football Club for the following season.

O'Sullivan Beach FC produced two Australian Football League (AFL) players, Craig McRae (Brisbane Lions, Brisbane Bears) and Mark Viska (Adelaide).

== A-Grade Premierships ==
- Southern Football League Division 2 (3)
  - 1986, 1996, 1997
