= Bailey Williams (footballer, born 1997) =

Australian rules footballer

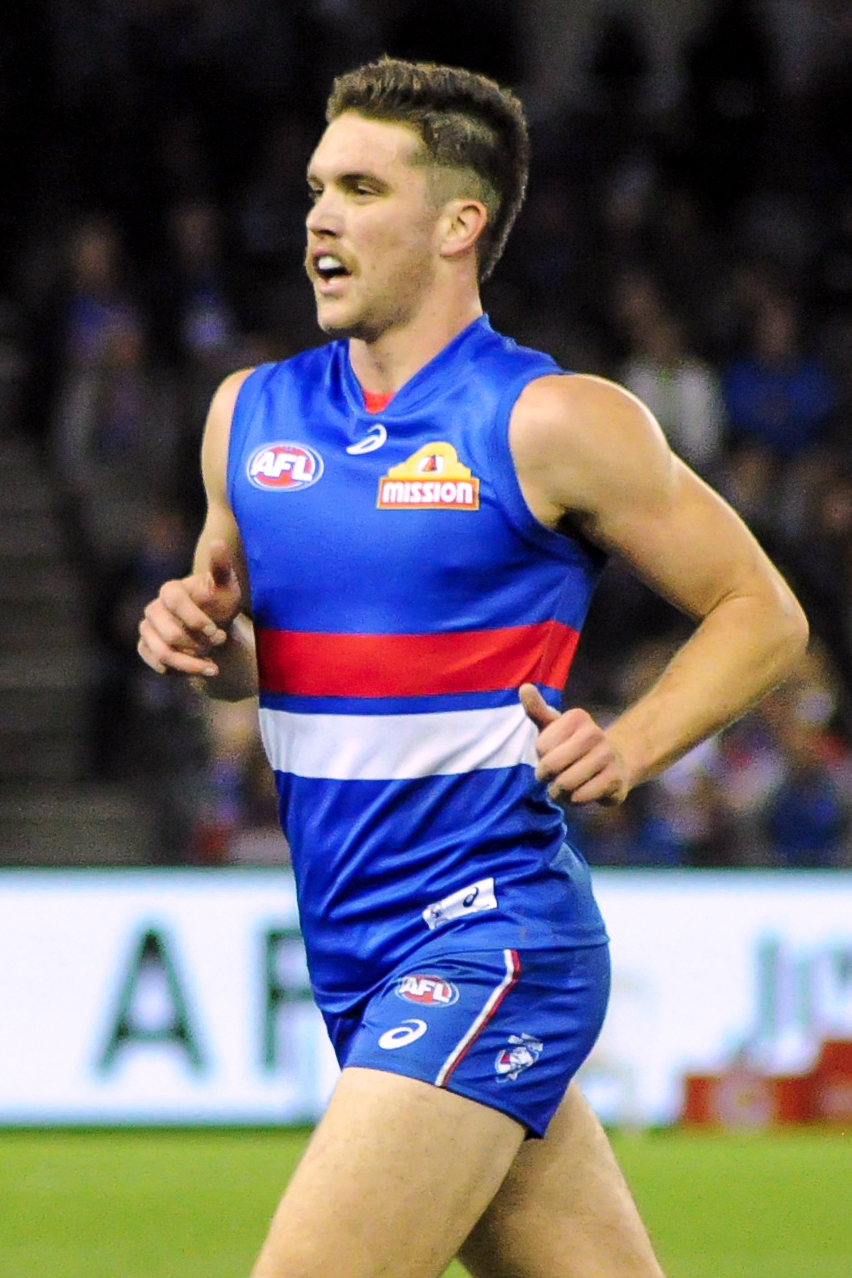
- Williams playing for the Western Bulldogs in April 2018

Personal information
- Full name: Bailey Williams
- Nicknames: "Horse", "Germ","Truck"
- Born: 10 October 1997 (age 29)
- Original team: Glenelg (SANFL)/Brighton Bombers
- Draft: No. 48, 2015 national draft
- Debut: Round 8, 2016, Western Bulldogs vs. Melbourne, at MCG
- Height: 189 cm (6 ft 2 in)
- Weight: 86 kg (190 lb)
- Position: Defender

Club information
- Current club: Western Bulldogs
- Number: 34

Playing career^{1}
Years	Club	Games (Goals)
2016–	Western Bulldogs	193 (50)
- ^{1} Playing statistics correct to the end of the 2026 season.

Career highlights
- VFL Premiership player: 2016; Western Bulldogs Most Improved Player: 2020

Bailey Williams (born 10 October 1997) is an Australian rules footballer playing for the Western Bulldogs in the Australian Football League (AFL). He is commonly referred to as 'the horse germ'. At 189 cm (6 ft 2 in) tall and 86 kg (190 lb), he plays primarily as a rebounding half-back who can shift into the midfield. He grew up in Adelaide, South Australia. He played top-level junior football with Glenelg in the South Australian National Football League. He was drafted by the Western Bulldogs with their fourth selection and forty-eighth overall in the 2015 AFL draft. Since then, he has been a VFL premiership player, and a winner of the Tony Liberatore Most Improved Player Award.

== Early football ==
He’s going to be a serious player because he just finds the footy, he’s a really calm, cool customer under pressure and he’s a good size for a midfielder.

— Brett Backwell

Williams played football for his school, Brighton Secondary School. He was named as the best on ground during their grand final win over Henley in 2015, winning the Peter Roberts medal. He also played for Glenelg's Under 18s division, where he flew under the radar of recruiters until he amassed 56 disposals in a single game against Woodville-West Torrens. This performance quickly got him the attention of drafters, with this performance breaking his previous record of 34 disposals, while also beating the league record for most disposals in a game. He was originally predicted at going pick 50 or later in the draft, but ended up rising to pick 48.

== AFL career ==
=== 2016–2019: Early career ===
Williams made his debut for the Western Bulldogs in the 8th round of the 2016 AFL season, in the team's 32 point win over Melbourne. On debut, Williams collected 14 disposals, a behind and 4 tackles. The rest of his season was relatively mediocre, playing 5 more games and averaging 16 disposals and 3 marks. He played in the reserves team, Footscray, in their premiership win over Casey, kicking a goal. Williams signed a two-year contract extension in May 2017, keeping him at the club until 2019. He played his first game for 2017 in Round 6, after he collected 31 disposals, 13 marks and 3 tackles for the reserves team. His first game back only saw him collect 11 disposals, 3 marks and 3 tackles, but he quickly stepped up his performance with a 23 disposal, 4 mark, 4 tackle performance the next week against Richmond. However, this was to be his highest disposal count for the season. He had another good game against Port Adelaide in round 22, collecting 19 disposals and 6 rebound 50s.

Williams retained a place in the Bulldogs best 22 in the 2018 AFL season, having his breakout game in round 3. In that game, he had career-high amounts of disposals and marks, collecting 26 and 12 respectively. He also kicked a goal, and was named in the team's best. A 24 disposal game in Round 9 saw him again be named as one of the Bulldogs' best, with coach Luke Beveridge describing him as "a player that is really progressing well". A foot injury suffered in Round 15 saw Williams kept out of the side for 7 rounds. He returned to the side for the final round of the home and away season, where he kicked a goal, had 18 disposals and 6 marks. Williams had a patchy start to 2019, only collecting 12 disposals which saw him get omitted. He was reinstated in the team in Round 5, but only collected 9 disposals and was again dropped. He briefly stopped his dodgy form, playing 7 consecutive games from round 10 to round 17, but was once again dropped and did not feature that year. He signed another two-year contract extension that saw him be tied to the club until 2021.

=== 2020–: Rapid improvement ===
Williams began to rapidly improve in his breakout 2020 AFL season, becoming a crucial part of the team's backline in a chaotic season affected by the COVID-19 pandemic. He kicked a goal in both of the first 2 matches of the year. He was named as one of the team's most valuable players in Round 8 after his 22 disposals, 4 marks and 6 rebound 50s helped the Bulldogs narrowly win over Gold Coast. The following round, Williams played his 50th game, notching up 23 disposals and 5 rebounds to be named as one of the team's best players in the 41 point loss to Richmond. He had another good game in Round 13, kicking a goal, collecting 19 touches and having 8 rebounds, his equal highest for the season. In late August, it was revealed that Williams was the competition's most improved player according to Champion Data statistics, becoming 194 percent more influential in games than he had been in 2019. Williams tried his best to get his team over the line in the elimination final against St Kilda, collecting 19 disposals, 3 rebounds and 6 marks, and was named as one of the finest Bulldogs players that game after they narrowly lost. At the end of the year, he ranked first in the team for Rebound 50s and metres gained, averaging 4.9 and 395.9 respectively. He finished fifth in the Charles Sutton Medal voting with a total of 121 votes, 84 behind first placed Caleb Daniel. He also won the Tony Liberatore Most Improved Player Award, after being recognised for his breakout season.

Williams had another season of good form in 2021. In the second round of the season, Williams helped the Bulldogs get over the line by seven points by winning a marking contest where he was outnumbered 3 to 1, which led to team captain Marcus Bontempelli kicking the winning goal. Williams signed a two-year contract extension with the club in April 2021, keeping him tied to the Bulldogs until 2023. In Round 5 of the 2021 AFL season, Williams suffered a collarbone injury, which ended his streak of 23 matches played in a row. This injury saw him miss three rounds of the season, before returning to the team in Round 9.

== Statistics ==
Updated to the end of round 22, 2026.

Legend
G	Goals	K	Kicks	D	Disposals	T	Tackles
B	Behinds	H	Handballs	M	Marks

Season	Team	No.	Games	Totals							Averages (per game)							Votes
Season	Team	No.	Games	G	B	K	H	D	M	T	G	B	K	H	D	M	T	Votes
2016	Western Bulldogs	34	6	0	1	39	54	93	18	10	0.0	0.2	6.5	9.0	15.5	3.0	1.7	0
2017	Western Bulldogs	34	12	0	6	111	85	196	47	28	0.0	0.5	9.3	7.1	16.3	3.9	2.3	0
2018	Western Bulldogs	34	14	7	6	191	90	281	70	31	0.5	0.4	13.6	6.4	20.1	5.0	2.2	1
2019	Western Bulldogs	34	9	0	4	99	39	138	41	20	0.0	0.4	11.0	4.3	15.3	4.6	2.2	0
2020 (Note: The 2020 season was played with 17 home-and-away matches per team (down from 22) and 16-minute quarters with time on (down from 20-minute quarters with time on) due to the impact of the COVID-19 pandemic.)	Western Bulldogs	34	18	3	2	202	96	298	82	24	0.2	0.1	11.2	5.3	16.6	4.6	1.3	1
2021	Western Bulldogs	34	23	1	2	247	136	383	104	53	0.0	0.1	10.7	5.9	16.7	4.5	2.3	0
2022	Western Bulldogs	34	22	7	7	192	129	321	82	39	0.3	0.3	8.7	5.9	14.6	3.7	1.8	0
2023	Western Bulldogs	34	23	11	9	215	165	380	116	60	0.5	0.4	9.3	7.2	16.5	5.0	2.6	1
2024	Western Bulldogs	34	24	9	3	252	205	457	137	51	0.4	0.1	10.5	8.5	19.0	5.7	2.1	0
2025	Western Bulldogs	34	23	5	7	237	216	453	146	43	0.2	0.3	10.3	9.4	19.7	6.3	1.9	0
2026	Western Bulldogs	34	15	6	8	181	123	304	92	29	0.4	0.5	12.1	8.2	20.3	6.1	1.9	0
Career			189	49	55	1966	1338	3304	935	388	0.3	0.3	10.4	7.1	17.5	4.9	2.1	3
