= O'Sullivan Beach-Lonsdale Football Club =

O'Sullivan Beach-Lonsdale

Names
- Full name: O'Sullivan Beach-Lonsdale Football Club
- Nickname(s): Lions
- Club song: "La Marseillaise"

Club details
- Founded: 2001; 24 years ago
- Competition: Adelaide Footy League
- Ground(s): Morphett Vale Primary School Oval, Morphett Vale

Uniforms
Home

The O'Sullivan Beach-Lonsdale Football Club, also known as the Lonsdale Lions, is an Australian rules football club that plays in the Adelaide Footy League.

== Overview ==
The club was formed as a merger of the Lonsdale Football Club and the O’Sullivan Beach Football Club at the end of the 2001 season. The club started in the Southern Football League competition in 2002 where they remained until 2017, fielding teams in Senior and some Junior grades.
