= Elijah Ware =

Australian rules footballer

Personal information
- Born: 14 April 1983 (age 43)
- Original team: Central District (SANFL)
- Debut: Round 12 2006, Port Adelaide vs. West Coast, at AAMI Stadium
- Height: 180 cm (5 ft 11 in)
- Weight: 75 kg (165 lb)

Playing career^{1}
Years	Club	Games (Goals)
2006	Port Adelaide	2 (1)
- ^{1} Playing statistics correct to the end of 2006.

Elijah Ware (born 14 April 1983) is a retired Australian Rules Football player, who played for Port Adelaide in the AFL, and played for the Central District Bulldogs in the SANFL.

Ware debuted for Central District in 2003, and became part of their premiership team in 2004. He was recruited from Pirie Lions in the Spencer Gulf Football League. Ware was recruited onto the Port Adelaide list for the 2005 season, being taken at pick number 7 in the Pre Season Draft.

Ware continued to play for Centrals in the SANFL while not playing for Port Adelaide. In round 4 of the 2005 SANFL season, he suffered an ACL (knee) injury, requiring a knee reconstruction, facing approximately 12 months on the sidelines, meaning he would not play again for the season.

Elijah made his debut for Port Adelaide against West Coast in 2006, in a match that Port Adelaide won by 37 points. He scored one goal in the match and got 5 disposals. He played in the next round against Melbourne, registering 9 disposals, 5 marks and 2 tackles and scoring a behind in what was to be his final AFL match. He was delisted at the end of the 2006 AFL season, part of a clean out of the club that saw about 7 players leave the club. He continued to play for Central District in the SANFL, and played in their premiership winning 2007 team.

Prior to the 2009 SANFL season it was announced that Elijah would be retiring from football in order to spend more time with his family.

He wore Guernsey number 14 for Port Adelaide, and wore Guernsey number 50 for Centrals.
