= Kangarilla Football Club =

Kangarilla

Names
- Full name: Kangarilla Football Club
- Nickname(s): Double Blues, Kangas
- Club song: "Even Flow - Pearl Jam"

Club details
- Founded: 1901; 124 years ago
- Colours
- Competition: Hills Football League
- President: Tyson Bowen
- Premierships: HCFA (6): 1935, 1936, 1937, 1938, 1940, 1946, 1953
- Ground: Kangarilla Oval

Uniforms
Home

The Kangarilla Football Club is an Australian rules football club first formed in 1901. In 1913, Kangarilla joined the Alexandra Football Association, where it participated for the three seasons that competition existed.

== History ==
Kangarilla joined the Southern Football Association in 1916 where it remained until 1922 when it shifted to the Hills Central Football Association for the 1923 season. Kangarilla would remain in Hills Central until 1961, being relegated to the B-Grade competition for the last 10 years, before it merged with the Clarendon Football Club to form the Mount Bold Football Club for the 1962 season.

Kangarilla reformed in 1966 and joined the Hills Central B-Grade competition before a restructure of football in the Hills saw them join the newly formed Hills Football League Southern Zone. Kangarilla were realigned into Division 3 of the Hills Football League in 1972, and then promoted for two seasons to Division 1 in 1979.

Kangarilla left the Hills Football League and joined the Southern Football League Division 2 competition in 1981, gaining promotion to Division 1 in 1984. They were relegated back to Division 2 for the 1987 season where they remained until the two divisions combined in 2002. In 2006 Kangarilla shifted back to the Hills Football League Division 2 competition.

Kangarilla continue to field Senior and Junior teams in the Hills Football League Division 2 competition.

== A-Grade Premierships ==
- Hills Central Football Association
  - A-Grade (6): 1935, 1936, 1937, 1938, 1940, 1946
  - B-Grade (1): 1953
- Hills Football League
  - Southern Zone (1): 1970
  - Division 2 (1): 2006
  - Division 3 (3): 1973, 1974, 1978
- Southern Football League
  - Division 2 (4): 1982, 1987, 1999, 2000
