= Danny Meyer (footballer) =

Australian rules footballer

Personal information
- Full name: Danny Meyer
- Born: 3 August 1986 (age 40); South Australia
- Original team: Glenelg
- Draft: 12th overall, 2004; Richmond
- Height: 184 cm (6 ft 0 in)
- Weight: 82 kg (181 lb)
- Positions: Midfielder, Defence

Playing career^{1}
Years	Club	Games (Goals)
2005–2008	Richmond	17 (7)
2009–2011	Port Adelaide	9 (1)
- ^{1} Playing statistics correct to the end of 2011.

Danny Meyer (born 3 August 1986) is a former Australian rules football player who played for the Port Adelaide Football Club and Richmond Tigers. Due to a hip injury he retired at the end of the 2011 season.

== AFL career ==
=== Richmond career (2005–2008) ===
Meyer was selected by Richmond with the twelfth selection in the 2004 AFL draft from Glenelg in the SANFL.

=== Port Adelaide career (2009–2011) ===
In October 2008, he was delisted by Richmond after 17 games with the club.

Meyer was picked up by Port Adelaide Power in the 2008 draft

He announced his retirement from AFL at the end of the 2011 season.
