= Rod Jameson =

Australian rules footballer, born 1970

Personal information
- Full name: Rod Jameson
- Born: 30 June 1970 (age 56); Kew, Victoria
- Original team: Glenelg
- Height: 185 cm (6 ft 1 in)
- Weight: 87 kg (192 lb)

Playing career^{1}
Years	Club	Games (Goals)
1991–1999	Adelaide	153 (113)
- ^{1} Playing statistics correct to the end of 1999.

Career highlights
- AFL Premiership player (1997); Adelaide Team of the Decade - Full Back

Rod Jameson (born 30 June 1970) is a former professional Australian rules footballer who played for the Adelaide Football Club in the Australian Football League (AFL). He was the Adelaide's leading goal kicker in 1991 before spending most of his later career in the midfield and backline. He was well known for his shaved head and superb long kicking and played in Adelaide's 1997 premiership win though he was injured during the first quarter of the game. He retired from the AFL at just 29 years of age.

He is now a pundit on ABC Radio on AFL matches held in Adelaide.

== Statistics ==
Legend
G	Goals	K	Kicks	D	Disposals	T	Tackles
B	Behinds	H	Handballs	M	Marks

Season	Team	No.	Games	Totals							Averages (per game)							Votes
Season	Team	No.	Games	G	B	K	H	D	M	T	G	B	K	H	D	M	T	Votes
1991	Adelaide	35	19	49	28	166	78	244	79	18	2.6	1.5	8.7	4.1	12.8	4.2	0.9	0
1992	Adelaide	35	14	23	14	131	100	231	48	14	1.6	1.0	9.4	7.1	16.5	3.4	1.0	0
1993	Adelaide	35	19	6	2	156	99	255	60	30	0.3	0.1	8.2	5.2	13.4	3.2	1.6	0
1994	Adelaide	35	20	0	0	235	120	355	61	27	0.0	0.0	11.8	6.0	17.8	3.1	1.4	0
1995	Adelaide	35	21	4	0	207	71	278	50	16	0.2	0.0	9.9	3.4	13.2	2.4	0.8	2
1996	Adelaide	35	17	4	2	200	90	290	67	23	0.2	0.1	11.8	5.3	17.1	3.9	1.4	5
1997†	Adelaide	35	22	9	3	188	59	247	66	16	0.4	0.1	8.5	2.7	11.2	3.0	0.7	5
1998	Adelaide	35	9	13	6	53	19	72	21	8	1.4	0.7	5.9	2.1	8.0	2.3	0.9	1
1999	Adelaide	35	12	5	2	86	56	142	31	9	0.4	0.2	7.2	4.7	11.8	2.6	0.8	1
Career			153	113	57	1422	692	2114	483	161	0.7	0.4	9.3	4.5	13.8	3.2	1.1	14
