= Jason Torney =

Australian rules footballer

Personal information
- Born: 16 June 1977 (age 49)
- Original team: South Adelaide (SANFL)
- Debut: Round 15, 23 June 1996, Richmond vs. Essendon, at the MCG
- Height: 187 cm (6 ft 2 in)
- Weight: 84 kg (185 lb)

Playing career^{1}
Years	Club	Games (Goals)
1995–2002	Richmond	118 (16)
2003–2007	Adelaide	77 (18)
Total		195 (34)
- ^{1} Playing statistics correct to the end of 2007.

Career highlights
- Adelaide pre-season premiership side 2003

Jason Torney (born 16 June 1977) is a former professional Australian rules footballer who played for the Richmond Football Club and the Adelaide Football Club in the Australian Football League (AFL).

== Richmond ==
Recruited from South Adelaide, Torney debuting in 1996 as a 19-year-old. Torney was slow in his development in the AFL and he played just six games in 1996, averaging just 5 disposals a game. In one particular game he went without possession all match. The following season he developed into an important player for Richmond, averaging 15 possessions per game, playing at half back and half forward. Torney played 118 games from Richmond in a successful career. However, in 2002 he was part of a trade with the Adelaide Crows, as then Crows player and Victorian-born Kane Johnson requested to return to his home state.

== Adelaide ==
Torney played every game for Adelaide in a successful 2003 season. He played only six games the next year though, and in 2005, was frustrated with an ongoing back problem. In 2006, the well-respected Torney was part of Adelaide's 8-man leadership group. But this season, once again, he was nagged by injury, playing his first game of the year in Round 12. Torney played every game in 2007 but was delisted at the end of the year. In his last AFL game, an elimination final against Hawthorn, he kicked a long goal from 55 metres out near the boundary line to put Adelaide up by four points with three minutes remaining. However, Adelaide struggled to gain possession and Lance Franklin kicked a goal from a similar distance with ten seconds remaining to win the game for Hawthorn.

In 2008, Torney returned to play for his original club, the South Adelaide Football Club, which plays in the SANFL. Jason retired from South Adelaide at the end of the 2009 season, gathering 41 possessions in his last game against North Adelaide at Prospect.

He was appointed coach of the South Adelaide U/18 team signing a 2-year deal at the start of 2010.
