= Chris Hall (Australian footballer) =

Australian rules footballer

Personal information
- Full name: Christopher Hall
- Born: 3 March 1982 (age 44)
- Original team: South Adelaide (SANFL)
- Draft: No. 3, 2001 Rookie Draft

Playing career^{1}
Years	Club	Games (Goals)
2003	Port Adelaide	2 (0)
- ^{1} Playing statistics correct to the end of 2012.

Chris Hall (born 3 March 1982) is a former Australian rules footballer who played with Port Adelaide in the Australian Football League (AFL) in 2003.

Both of Hall's games in the AFL were against Hawthorn.

He later played for Subiaco in the West Australian Football League (WAFL) between 2006 and 2008, winning the Simpson Medal as the best player in Subiaco's 2008 Grand Final win.
