= Ben Marsh =

Australian rules footballer

Personal information
- Full name: Benjamin Keith Marsh
- Born: 9 July 1976 (age 50)
- Original team: West Adelaide (SANFL)
- Height: 201 cm (6 ft 7 in)
- Weight: 102 kg (16 st 1 lb; 225 lb)
- Position: Ruckman / Full forward

Playing career^{1}
Years	Club	Games (Goals)
1998–2003	Adelaide	48 (17)
2004	Richmond	7 (1)
Total		55 (18)
- ^{1} Playing statistics correct to the end of 2004.

Career highlights
- AFL Premiership player (1998)

Benjamin Keith Marsh (born 9 July 1976) is a former Australian rules footballer who played with Adelaide and Richmond in the Australian Football League (AFL).

A tall 201 cm ruckman and an accurate goal kicking forward, Marsh made his league debut with West Adelaide in the South Australian National Football League (SANFL) in 1996 and made his AFL debut for Adelaide in 1998 against the Sydney Swans at the Sydney Cricket Ground and played in their Grand Final win over North Melbourne at the Melbourne Cricket Ground.

Marsh remained with the Crows for another five seasons before being delisted at the end of 2003. He was then picked up in the 2004 pre-season draft by Richmond where he would add a further 7 games and one goal to his tally before retiring at the end of 2004.

In 2025, Marsh's son Mitch who also plays at West Adelaide, was selected in the forward pocket of the U18 Boys All Australian team after South Australia won the National U18 Championships.

== Statistics ==
Legend
G	Goals	K	Kicks	D	Disposals	T	Tackles
B	Behinds	H	Handballs	M	Marks	H/O	Hit-outs

Season	Team	No.	Games	Totals								Averages (per game)							
Season	Team	No.	Games	G	B	K	H	D	M	T	H/O	G	B	K	H	D	M	T	H/O
1998†	Adelaide	31	9	4	3	26	20	46	20	1	70	0.4	0.3	2.9	2.2	5.1	2.2	0.1	7.8
1999	Adelaide	31	1	0	0	0	1	1	0	0	0	0.0	0.0	0.0	1.0	1.0	0.0	0.0	0.0
2000	Adelaide	31	12	5	7	48	37	85	35	9	120	0.4	0.6	4.0	3.1	7.1	2.9	0.8	10.0
2001	Adelaide	31	18	7	7	78	57	135	40	15	187	0.4	0.4	4.3	3.2	7.5	2.2	0.8	10.4
2002	Adelaide	31	6	1	0	20	14	34	9	7	50	0.2	0.0	3.3	2.3	5.7	1.5	1.2	8.3
2003	Adelaide	31	2	0	1	2	0	2	2	0	15	0.0	0.5	1.0	0.0	1.0	1.0	0.0	7.5
2004	Richmond	15	7	1	0	19	24	43	16	5	73	0.1	0.0	2.7	3.4	6.1	2.3	0.7	10.4
Career			55	18	18	193	153	346	122	37	515	0.3	0.3	3.5	2.8	6.3	2.2	0.7	9.4
