= McLaren Vale Football Club =

Australian rules football club

McLaren Vale
- Full name: McLaren Vale Football Club
- Nickname: Crushers
- Sport: Australian Rules Football
- Folded: 1997
- League: Southern Football League
- Home ground: McLaren Vale Oval, McLaren Vale
- Colours: Blue, Red, White

The McLaren Vale Football Club was an Australian rules football club that was an inaugural member of the Southern Football Association in 1886.

McLaren competed in the Southern Football League until the end of the 1997 season, when they merged with the McLaren Flat Football Club and McLaren Districts Junior Football Club to form the McLaren Football Club.

== A-Grade Premierships ==
- Southern Football Association A-Grade (7)
  - 1905, 1906, 1908, 1920, 1924, 1958, 1959
- Southern Football League Division 2 (3)
  - 1980, 1981, 1995
