= O'Sullivan Beach, South Australia =

O'Sullivan Beach
- Suburb
- Coordinates: 35.119°S 138.475°E
- Country: Australia
- State: South Australia
- Region: Southern Adelaide
- City: Adelaide
- LGA: City of Onkaparinga
- Established: 1926

Government
  - State electorate: Reynell

Population
  - Total: 1,844 (SAL 2021)
- Postcode: 5166
- County: Adelaide
Suburbs around O'Sullivan Beach
Gulf St Vincent	Lonsdale	Lonsdale
Gulf St Vincent	O'Sullivan Beach	Lonsdale
Gulf St Vincent	Christies Beach	Christies Beach

O'Sullivan Beach is a seaside suburb in the southern Adelaide metropolitan area, within the City of Onkaparinga. O'Sullivan Beach has a unique postcode of 5166.

== Development ==
The very first development to occur along the coast of O'Sullivan Beach can be traced back to pre-colonization times, almost 40,000 years ago. The Aboriginal Kaurna people used the coastal area of O'Sullivan Beach as a place for seasonal residence. In particular the mouth of Christie Creek was used as a Kaurna campsite. Christie Creek was also one of the last recorded sites where traditional burial practices were observed.

An area of surveyed land covering Glenelg to Witton Bluff (Christies Beach) known as District B, was made available for settlement in 1838. Many farmers took plots of land along the Anderson Creek (now known as Christies Creek). The entire area remained a land of farming communities until 1923. This is when Rosa Christie created the first subdivision in the area, it was named Christies Beach. In 1926 the suburb of O'Sullivan Beach was subdivided by a group developers - F.E. Wakelin, W.A. Hill, D.B. Neck and F.L. Lillecrap - the developers named the suburb after Ignatius O’Sullivan who arrived from Ireland and settled in this area in 1840.

The O'Sullivan Beach suburb was developed to provide housing to accompany the development of the Lonsdale industrial development and the adjacent Port Stanvac oil refinery facility.

The suburb of O’Sullivan Beach was further developed as a public housing estate in the 1960s and 1970s by the South Australian Housing Trust. However, most of these homes have subsequently become privately owned.

== Boat ramp ==
A large boat ramp with protective breakwaters allows boats to be easily launched and landed at O'Sullivan Beach. For over 30 years, a kiosk and tackle shop operated adjacent to the ramp. A large parking area provides elevated views of the surrounding coast and ocean. As of 2021 the boatramp is council managed and launch permits can be purchased from the City of Onkaparinga.

== Shellfish reef ==
In November 2021, an artificial shellfish reef was constructed 500 metres offshore from O'Sullivan Beach. The reef covers a 5 hectare area and has been seeded with young Ostrea angasi, a native flat oyster species. The reef itself is constructed from limestone rock and 7 tonnes of oyster shells from commercial oyster farms on Eyre Peninsula. The reef sits in water of an average depth of 10 metres, and rises 0.5 metres above the seabed. The reef construction is the third of its kind to be built in the state, following similar projects offshore from Ardrossan (Windara Reef) and Glenelg. The reef is expected to improve ambient water quality and provide habitat for a variety of marine species.
