= Clarendon Football Club =

Australian rules football club

Clarendon
- Full name: Clarendon Football Club
- Sport: Australian Rules Football
- Folded: 1961
- Home ground: Clarendon Recreation Ground, Clarendon
- Colours: Blue, White

The Clarendon Football Club was an Australian rules football club based in the township of Clarendon, South Australia.

The first record of Clarendon was in the Alexandra Football Association from 1913 to 1915, the three seasons that competition was in existence, winning the first and last premierships. After the First World War, Clarendon reformed and joined the Mid-Southern Football Association.

Clarendon joined the Southern Football Association in 1935, lasting only two seasons before shifting to the Hills Central Football Association. Clarendon were associated with the Hills Central Association over the next 26 years, dropping to the B-Grade competition at times. Their peak in that competition came with a grand final loss to Echunga in 1955, whilst their reserves won the B-Grade premiership that season.

At the end of the 1961 season, Clarendon merged with the Kangarilla Football Club to form the Mount Bold Football Club for four seasons. When the Mount Bold team disbanded, Kangarilla were re-established but Clarendon never reformed.

== A-Grade Premierships ==
- Alexandra Football Association (2)
  - 1913, 1915
