= Willunga Football Club =

Willunga

Names
- Full name: Willunga Football Club
- Nickname: Demons
- Club song: "We are Willunga Football Club (Demons Song)"

Club details
- Founded: 1874; 152 years ago
- Colours
- Competition: Great Southern
- President: Julie Clifton
- Coach: Mitchell Portlock
- Ground: Willunga Oval, Willunga

Uniforms
Home

Other information
- Official website: willungafc.com.au

The Willunga Football Club is an Australian rules football club first formed on 29 May 1874, making it one of the oldest football clubs in South Australia behind Port Adelaide which was established in 1870.

== History ==
Willunga was an inaugural member of the South Australian Football Association (SAFA), a precursor to the South Australian National Football League (SANFL). Willunga left SAFA to become a foundation member of the Southern Football Association in 1886.

By 1891, the Southern Football Association was in recess and Willunga played “challenge” matches against various towns in the region. In the year of 1892, Willunga declared itself “Premiers of the South”, having played eight first-class matches, winning six and drawing two.

In 1892, plans began to reform the Southern Football Association, and Willunga joined the Sellick’s Hill and Aldinga clubs in this revived competition in 1893, winning the premiership in the first season. Willunga remained a member of the Southern Football Association, later Southern Football League for all seasons it was in operation until the end of the 1985 season, when they transferred to the Great Southern Football League for the 1986 season, ironically the 100th anniversary of the establishment of the Southern Football League. Willunga had previously been accepted into the Great Southern League for the 1976 season, however an amendment to the Southern League's constitution blocked the move at that time. The Willunga FC continues to field teams in Senior and Junior grades in the Great Southern Football League.

Willunga FC has produced a number of Australian Football League (AFL/VFL) players including Randall Bone (Adelaide, Hawthorn), Ben Thompson (St Kilda) and Tom Waye (Footscray). Hendrick Waye won a Magarey Medal for Sturt in 1903 during a career where he would regularly suit up for both clubs.

== A-Grade Premierships ==
- Southern Football Association A-Grade (28)
  - 1892, 1893, 1894, 1895, 1897, 1898, 1899, 1901, 1902, 1903, 1904, 1909, 1910, 1911, 1912, 1919, 1923, 1936, 1938, 1948, 1949, 1950, 1951, 1952, 1954, 1955, 1956, 1961
- Southern Football League A-Grade (1)
  - 1964
- Southern Football League Division 1 (1)
  - 1984
- Great Southern Football League A-Grade (10)
  - 1986, 1988, 1998, 2004, 2005, 2006, 2007, 2008, 2009, 2021
