= McLaren Flat Football Club =

McLaren Flat
- Full name: McLaren Flat Football Club
- Nickname: Eagles
- Sport: Australian Rules Football
- Founded: 1903
- Folded: 1997
- League: Southern Football League
- Home ground: McLaren Flat Oval, McLaren Flat
- Colours: Blue, Gold

The McLaren Flat Football Club was an Australian rules football originally formed as the Hillside Football Club in 1903 playing in the Southern Football Association. The Hillside club was named after "Hilside", a farm owned by Mr Fred Wilson of McLaren Vale, one President of the Southern Football Association.

Hillside was renamed McLaren Flat in 1946 and remained in the Southern Football League until the end of the 1997 season, when they merged with the McLaren Vale Football Club and McLaren Districts Junior Football Club to form the McLaren Football Club.

== A-Grade Premierships ==
- Southern Football Association A-Grade (6)
  - 1933, 1935, 1937 undefeated, 1939 undefeated, 1946, 1947
- Southern Football League Division 1 (2)
  - 1966, 1976
- Southern Football League Division 2 (3)
  - 1983, 1988, 1989

== Significant Players ==
Sturt champions Paul Bagshaw and Tony Burgan were both recruited from McLaren Flat.
