= Cleland (surname) =

Cleland is a surname of Scottish origin.

People named Cleland include:

- Alan Cleland (born 2002), Mexican surfer
- Alberta Cleland (1876–1960), Canadian Impressionist painter and educator
- Alec Cleland (born 1970), Scottish footballer
- Andrew N. Cleland (born 1961), American physicist
- Bruce Cleland (born 1958), Scottish footballer
- Carol Cleland (born 1948), American philosopher
- Cook Cleland (1916–2007), American air race pilot
- David Cleland, co-founder of the Nature Foundation in South Australia in 1981
- David I. Cleland (1926–2018), American engineer, academic and author of project management textbooks
- Donald Cleland (1901–1975), Australian soldier and administrator
- E. Davenport Cleland (1854–1928), journalist and mine manager in South Australia and Western Australia
- Edward Erskine Cleland (1869–1943), South Australian jurist
- Hance Cleland (1884–1859), American politician
- James Cleland (disambiguation)
- Jane K. Cleland, American author
- Jean Cleland (1895–1978), British magazine journalist
- Joan Burton Cleland (1916–2000), South Australian ornithologist
- John Cleland (disambiguation)
- Joseph P. Cleland (1901–1975), American general
- Margaret Cleland (died 2011), Scottish police officer
- Marshal Cleland (1912–1958), Canadian equestrian champion
- Max Cleland (1942–2021), American politician
- Melinda Cleland (born 1984), Australian gymnast
- Rachel Cleland (1906–2002), Australian expatriate community and social welfare worker
- Ralph Erskine Cleland (1892–1971), American botanist
- Robert Hardy Cleland (born 1947), US district judge
- Ruth Cleland (born 1976), New Zealand artist
- Scott Cleland, American researcher and analyst
- Tammy Cleland (born 1975), American swimmer
- Tim Cleland (born 1984), Australian water polo player
- Thomas Maitland Cleland (1880–1964), American book designer, painter, illustrator, and type designer
- Victoria Cleland (born 1970), Chief Cashier of the Bank of England
- William Cleland (poet) (c. 1661–1689), Scottish poet and soldier
- William Cleland (surgeon) (1912–2005), British cardiothoracic surgeon
- W. L. Cleland (1847–1918), medical doctor in South Australia
- W. Wallace Cleland (1930–2013), American biochemistry professor

== See also ==
- Jane Cleland-Huang, English-born American software engineer
- Cleland (disambiguation)
- Clelland
- Clevland of Tapeley Park, Devon
