= Mount Lofty Fire Tower =

Fire lookout tower in Adelaide Hills

Coordinates: 34°58′28″S 138°42′32″E

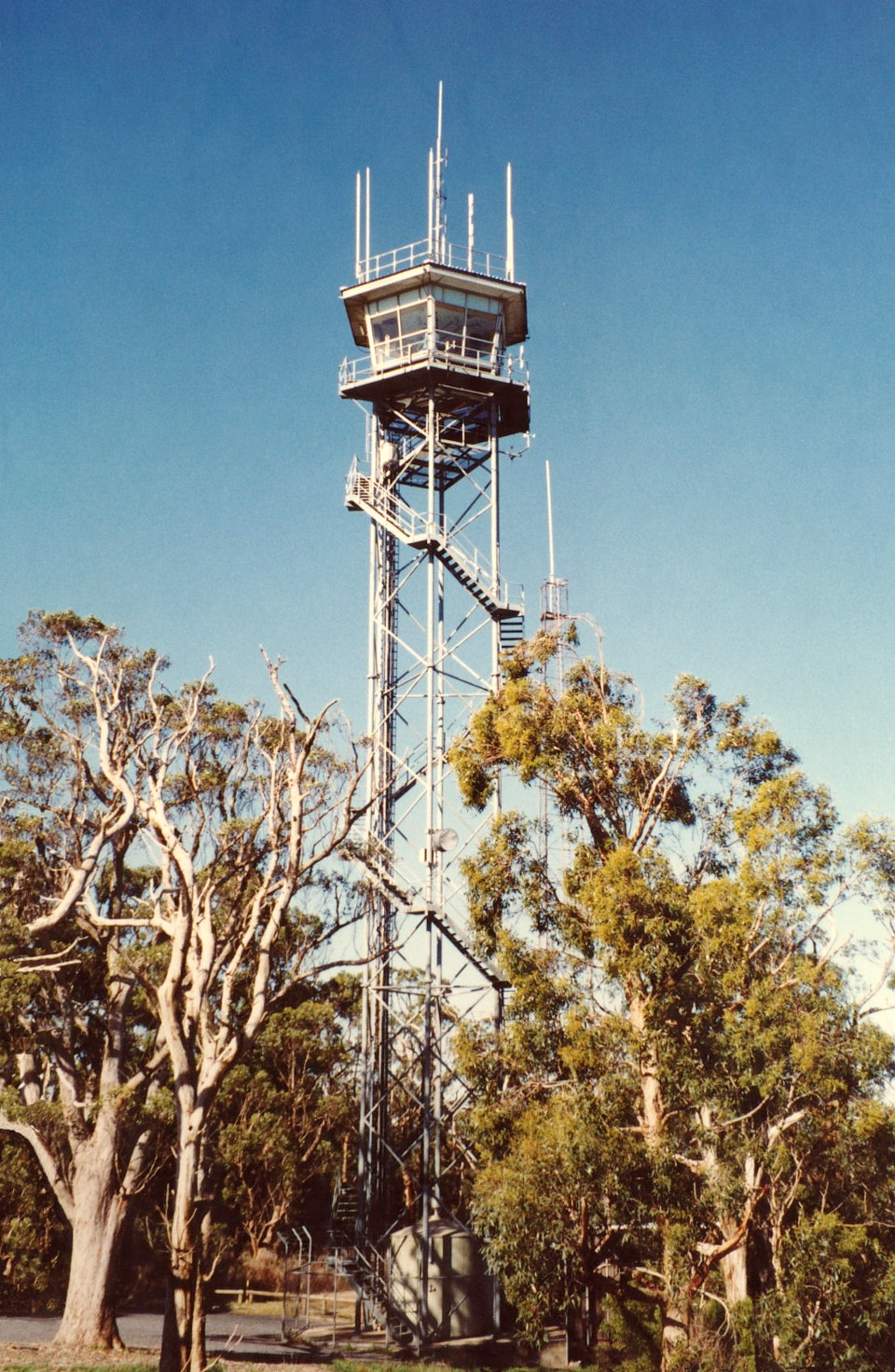
Mount Lofty Fire Tower

The Mount Lofty Fire Tower sits on top of Mount Lofty in the Adelaide Hills just to the east of the city of Adelaide, South Australia. The 34m high tower has a commanding view over a huge area of the rural areas surrounding Adelaide, and on a clear day the view can extend to as far as Kangaroo Island to the southwest, Monarto to the east, the Fleurieu Peninsula to the south, and the grassy plains beyond Two Wells to the north. The tower is used to spot fires in the Adelaide Hills and surrounds on days of very high or extreme fire danger during summer. The spotting crew determine the location of a smoke sighting by taking a bearing and then calculating distance using topographic maps. Details of the sighting are then passed to the 'Adelaide Fire' Communications Centre who despatch the nearest fire brigade.

== History ==
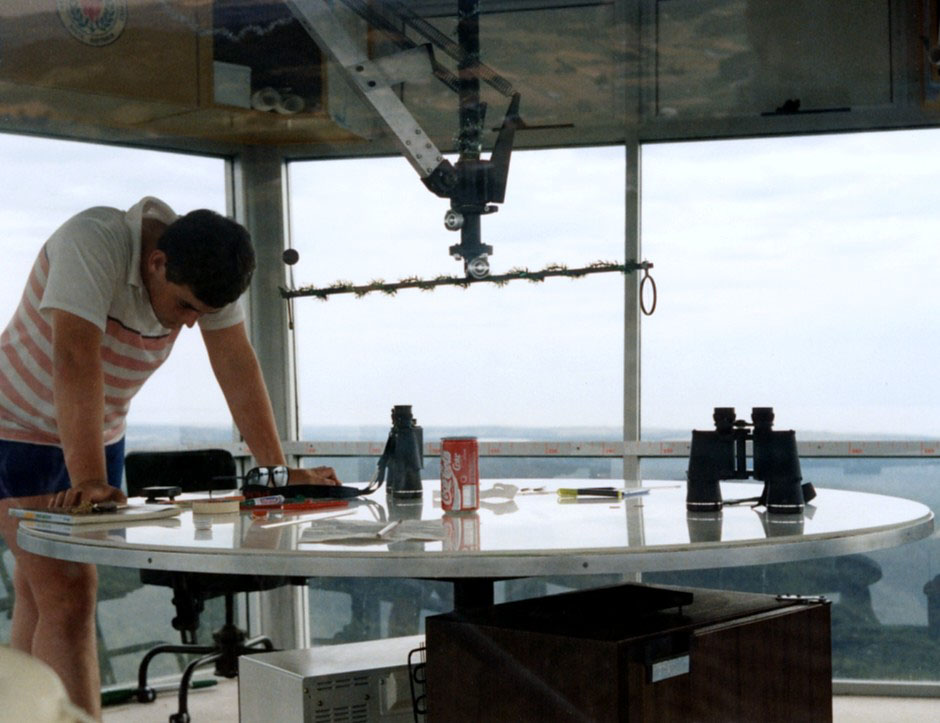
Fire spotter on the job, 1988

The tower, which sits within Cleland National Park, was built in 1980 and initially staffed by National Parks and Wildlife Service officers. The Country Fire Service took over responsibility for the tower in 1987, recruiting a paid staff of three fire spotters on a contract basis who between them maintained an eight-hour watch for the entire Fire Danger Season from 1 December to 30 April. The spotting crew typically reported close to 200 sightings per season. In the mid-1990s a volunteer unit was established specifically to operate the fire tower, and this was then formally recognised as a Country Fire Service brigade in November 2000.

== Ash Wednesday, February 1983 ==
The National Parks and Wildlife Service crew who staff the tower during the Ash Wednesday fires on 16 February 1983 later recalled the ferocity with which the fire came tearing up through Cleland Conservation Park towards them. The main fire that day started at nearby Mount Osmond and reached the summit of Mount Lofty well within an hour (a typical bushfire would take several hours to cover this same distance). Visibility was obscured due to severe dust storms generated by the strong winds, and the crew only evacuated the tower as the fire was literally at their doorstep. Although the steel structure of the tower survived intact, the windows of the 34m high tower were completely shattered. The spotters were forced to simply shelter in the carpark below as the fire passed over them.

== Australia Live broadcast ==
On 1 January 1988 the Mount Lofty Fire Tower was beamed live around Australia on Channel 9 television as part of the Australia Live broadcast to celebrate the Australian Bicentenary. The three members of the spotting crew appeared on the broadcast along with former Adelaide radio journalist Murray Nicoll, who received a Walkley Award for his live report from his own street in Greenhill as it burned around him during the Ash Wednesday fires in 1983. Following the Australia Live broadcast the three teenage members of the spotting crew appeared in several local media pieces and appeared in a two-page feature article in Woman's Day magazine.

== Tower safety concerns ==
During February 2009 with some of the hottest weather on record, this 34m tower, the focal point for all fire-spotting activities in the Mt Lofty region, was unstaffed. CFS members say new civilian communications antennas on top of the tower made it sway uncontrollably in wind. Two experienced fire spotters feared for their own safety before they walked down the spiral staircase to the ground.

The tower was re-opened after a years absence, and has been regularly staffed each fire season since by the Mount Lofty fire tower brigade of the CFS.
