= Eurilla Conservation Park =

Protected area in South Australia

- IUCN category III (natural monument or feature)
- Location within South Australia
- Location: South Australia
- Nearest city: Stirling
- Coordinates: 34°58′57″S 138°42′43″E
- Area: 7 ha (17 acres)
- Established: 22 September 1977
- Governing body: Department for Environment and Water

Eurilla Conservation Park was a protected area located in the Australian state of South Australia in the suburb of Crafers in the Adelaide Hills state government region about 11 kilometres (6.8 mi) south-east of the state capital of Adelaide and about 2.4 kilometres (1.5 mi) north of the town centre in Stirling. It was merged with the adjoining Cleland Conservation Park to become a national park called Cleland National Park on 26 November 2021.

The conservation park consisted of land in section 535 in the cadastral unit of the Hundred of Onkaparinga, located to the east of the Mount Lofty Summit Road about 1 kilometre (0.62 mi) south of the summit of Mount Lofty and bounded on its northern boundary by the Cleland Conservation Park. It was proclaimed under the National Parks and Wildlife Act 1972 on 22 September 1977. As of 2016, it covered an area of 7 hectares (17 acres).

In 1980, it was described as follows:

The main feature, and reason for dedication of the park, is an undisturbed bog consisting of a dense mat of the rare coral fern (Gleichenia microphylla) and a sizeable colony of mature king fern (Todea barbara), an endangered species in South Australia. These specimens are amongst the finest in the state. An excellent bog habitat surrounded by Eucalyptus obliqua open forest over an open shrub stratum of Exocarpos cupressiformis, Banksia marginata and Pultenaea daphnoides. A dense ground stratum consists of a wide variety of herbs, grasses and forbs. There are many fallen logs in various stages of decay together with a substantial accumulation of forest litter. The park is substantially undisturbed and surrounded by native vegetation on three sides. This area has not been burnt since 1920, and suffers only minor influence from introduced species.

The conservation park was classified as an IUCN Category III protected area. In 1980, it was listed on the now-defunct Register of the National Estate.

== See also ==
- Protected areas of South Australia
