= Uraidla, South Australia =

Uraidla
- Town
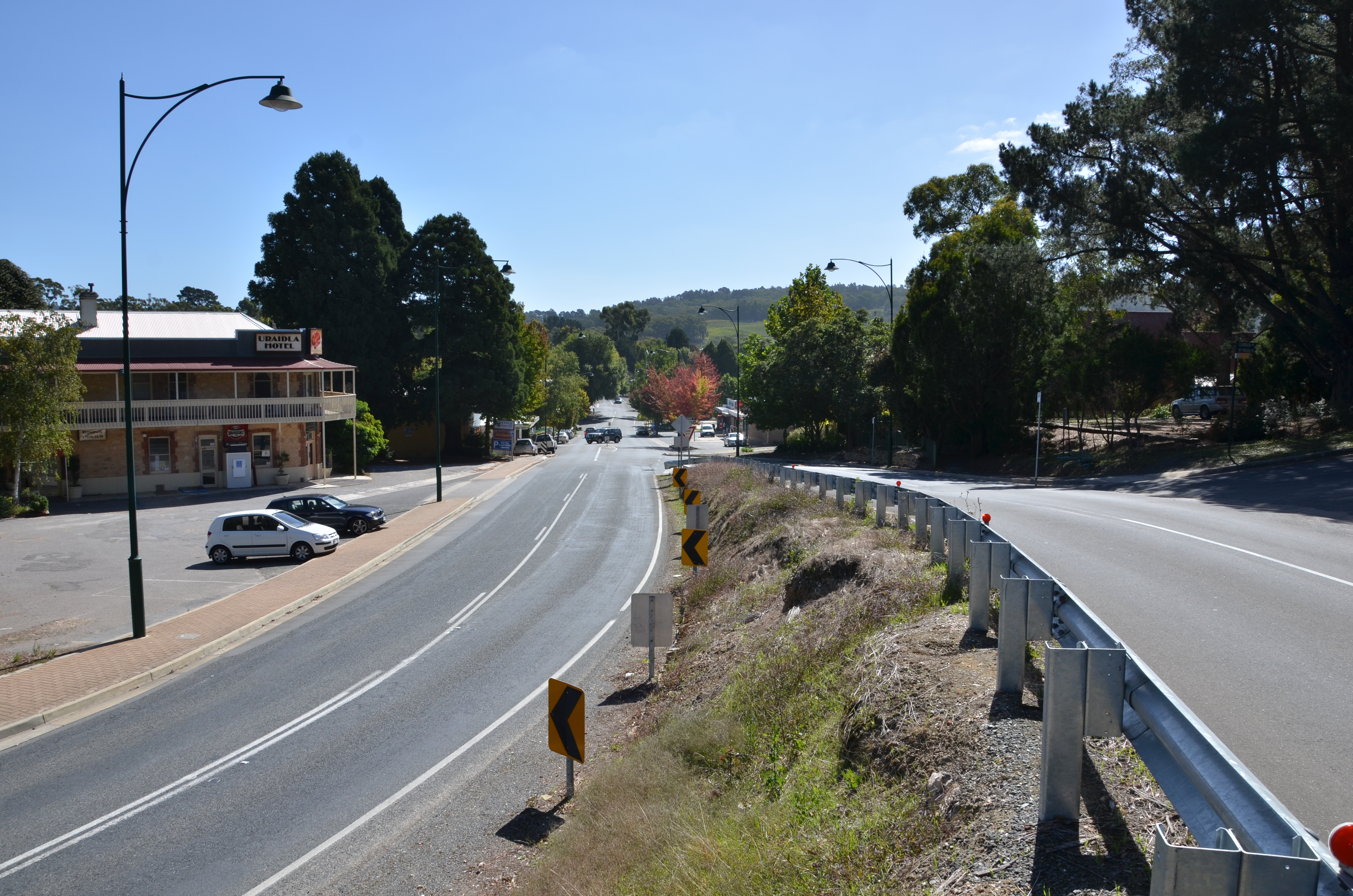
- Main street of Uraidla

- Coordinates: 34°57′0″S 138°44′0″E
- Country: Australia
- State: South Australia
- LGA: Adelaide Hills Council
- Location: 17 km (11 mi) from Adelaide
- Established: 1880s

Government
  - State electorate: Morialta
  - Federal division: Mayo

Population
  - Total: 581 (SAL 2021)
- Postcode: 5142
Localities around Uraidla
| Basket Range | Basket Range | Basket Range |
| Summertown | Uraidla | Basket Range |
| Piccadilly | Carey Gully | Carey Gully |

Uraidla (/jʊəˈreɪdlə/; yoo-RAYD-lə) is a small town in the Adelaide Hills of South Australia, Australia. At the 2021 census, Uraidla had a population of 581. However it also sits at the centre of a larger population catchment of rural townships which include Summertown, Piccadilly, Ashton, Basket Range, Carey Gully, Norton Summit and Cherryville.

The name is derived from the Kaurna name Yuridla, which means "two ears" and originally referred to the two nearby peaks of Mt Lofty and Mt Bonython, and also relates to the Dreaming story of Ngarnu, a giant from the east.

== History ==
Once the home of the Peramangk Aboriginal people, European settlement commenced in the mid nineteenth century, a primary school opened in 1871 and the town was formally established in the 1880s. A tiny red brick building in the main street bears a plaque declaring that it was the local branch of the Scottish and Welsh Bank. The original courthouse (now a cottage) still stands on the corner of Swamp Road and Greenhill Road. The original general store still exists as a two-storey house near the junction of Days Road and Greenhill Road. The mainstreet of Uraidla was originally planted with a double avenue of European Elms. Only four of these remain.

== Etymology ==
The name Uraidla is derived from local Aboriginal origins. The neighbouring Kaurna people (from the Adelaide plains) and a local subgroup known as Peramangk, had a tale about an ancestral giant who fell in battle and whose body formed part of the Mount Lofty Ranges, with his ears forming Mount Lofty and Mount Bonython. The name Yurrēidla thus derives from the Kaurna words yurre (ear) and the suffix denoting location, -illa (Teichelmann & Schurmann 1840). This was later corrupted to Uraidla and adopted as the name of the town.

== Amenities ==
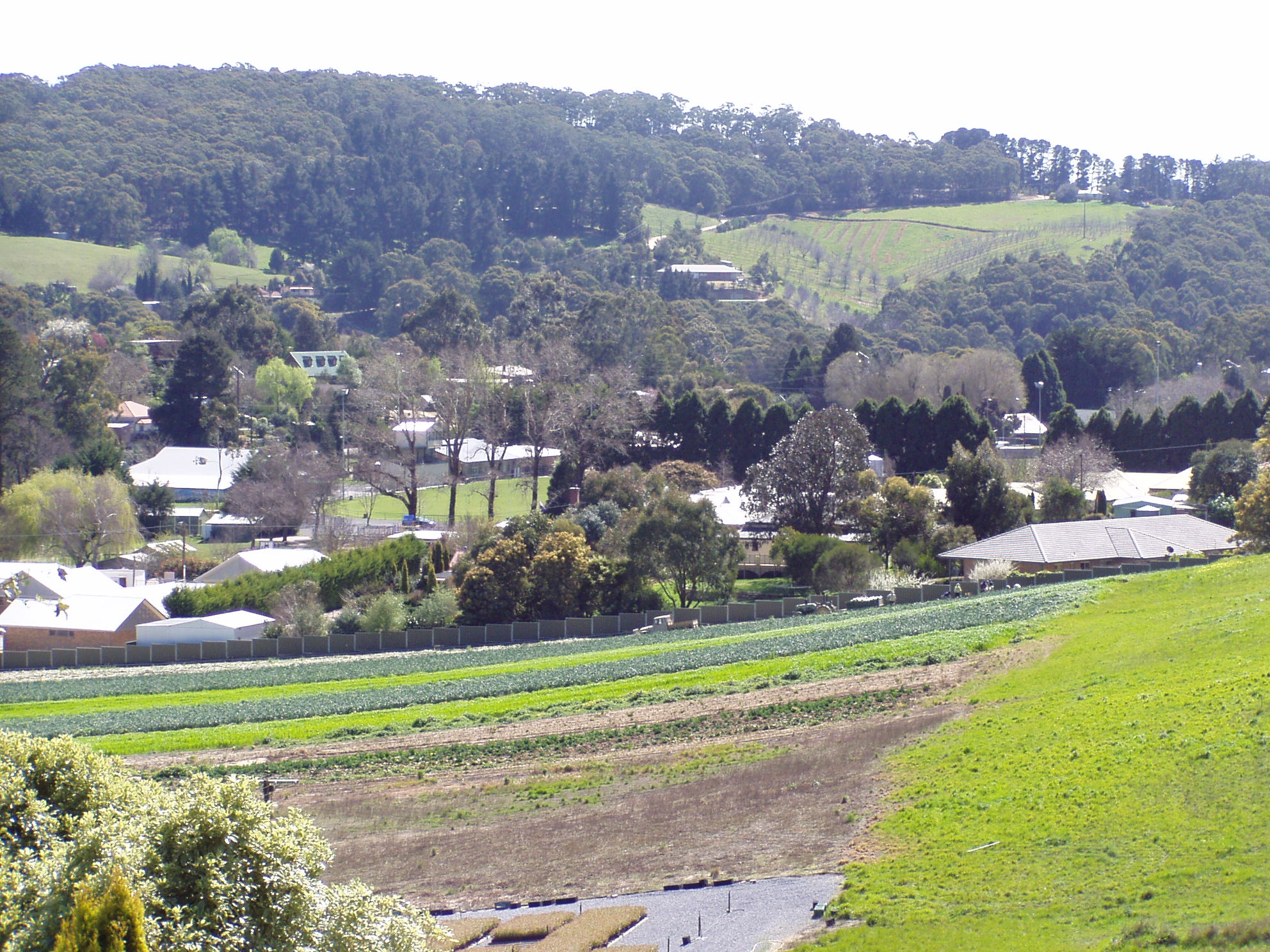
Market gardens in Uraidla

Uraidla and the surrounding area is an agricultural district with vegetable market gardens on large scale producing leek, cabbage and lettuce, with apple and cherry orchards, along with vineyards producing many local wine vintages. Local wineries that are part of the Adelaide Hills wine district include Parish Hills Wines and Barratt Wines.

The Uraidla Hotel had been closed for several years from 2013, but was refurbished in 2016 as a store.

The central oval and showgrounds are used annually for the historic Uraidla and Summertown Show, drawing many hundreds of people, traditionally in mid-February; shifted in 2017 to early November. Uraidla is also traditionally a centre for sport with Australian rules football, Netball, Tennis and Lawn Bowls the main sports. The Football Club Rooms and Bowling Club both have licensed premises.

Uraidla and nearby Summertown and Carey Gully are serviced by a mixed business General Store and Post Office and a Village Pharmacy and Health Spa, Hairdresser, Civil Engineering and the Uraidla Family Practice. Private massage therapists, chiropractors, artists and craftspeople, a metal foundry, a salvage warehouse and a freestone quarry also operate in the town or immediate area.

The former Returned Servicemen's League Hall in the main street is now being used by the Country Fire Service as the hub for the several local fire crews of Ashton, Summertown, Carey Gully and Piccadilly. During Emergency Fire Events, this site is used for strategic coordination, media interaction, broadcast by television crews and the adjacent Oval is used by helicopters as a landing site.
