= Cleland =

Cleland may refer to:

== Places ==
- Cleland, South Australia, a suburb
  - Cleland National Park, a protected area in South Australia
    - Cleland Wildlife Park, a zoo within the area of Cleland National Park
- Cleland, North Lanarkshire, a small village in Scotland
  - Cleland railway station, the Network Rail train station in the abovementioned village

== People ==
- Cleland (surname)
