= Pioneer Women's Trail =

Historical walking trail in South Australia

The Pioneer Women's Trail is a historical walking trail in South Australia that traverses approximately 26 kilometres (16 mi) from Beaumont to Hahndorf. The trail is part of a greater historical route where Adelaide Hills merchants would travel into Adelaide to transport and sell produce.

== History ==
The Pioneer Women's Trail originally followed ancient hills trails of the Peramangck peoples, the traditional custodians of the Adelaide Hills region.

Within weeks of settling Hahndorf, women and girls would walk the bush track around ~35 kilometers to Adelaide to sell food, as imported foods were expensive and scarce in the early colony.

== Revival ==
The original trail fell out of use due to modern transport innovations. It was rediscovered by the Hahndorf and Burnside Branches of the National Trust of South Australia.

Because of the modern land use consisting of private property, and some parts of the trail being chopped in half by the South Eastern Freeway, the current trail cannot follow the original alignment precisely. It has been adapted, remaining as faithful as possible to the original.

The National Trust of South Australia operates an annual walking event, though avid hikers can access the trail year-round subject to CFS restrictions.

== Modern route ==
The trail starts at Brock Reserve, at the top of Glynburn Road, opposite from Beaumont House. The trail continues upwards along the escarpment of Mount Osmond and flattens out at Mount Osmond lookout, where it widens and merges with the Old Bullock Track, a historic road reserve originally assessed as a possible alignment of the South Eastern Freeway, though never used for this purpose. The Bullock Track continues as a pedestrian and cycling-only gravel road until a set of Bollards, where it continues as a normal Gravel Road. At Eagle on The Hill, the Bullock Track then terminates at an intersection with the old freeway, where walkers are directed through Cleland National Park.

The trail then traverses the Main Street of Crafers before crossing the South Eastern Freeway on a pedestrian bridge, following the freeway's alignment along the south. It then continues along Pomona Road before crossing the freeway again and passing through the Golf Course. It then follows streets in Bridgewater until traversing along Mount Barker Road where the trail comes to an end at Hahndorf.
