= Crafers, South Australia =

Crafers
- Suburb
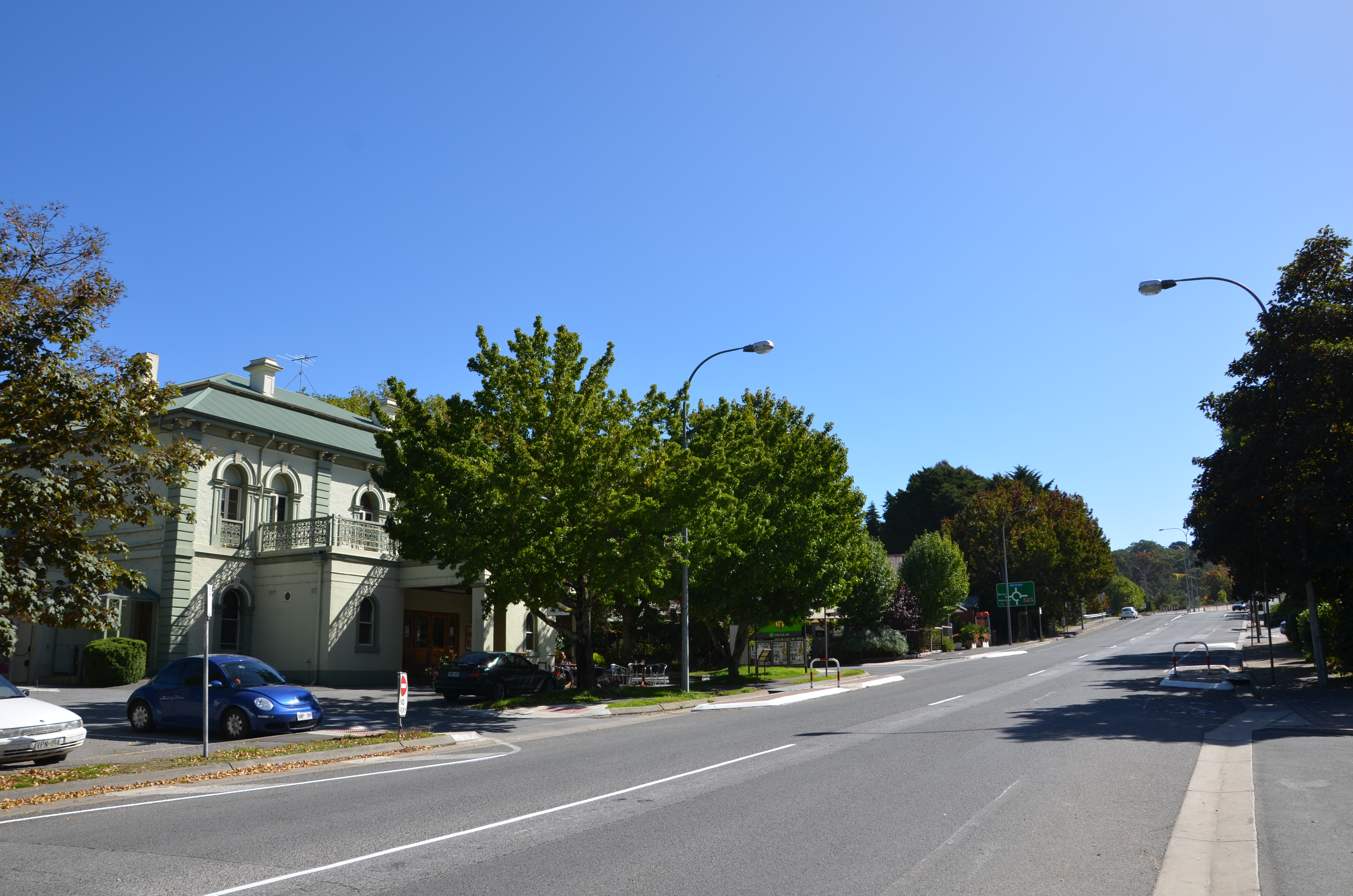
- Crafers main street

- Coordinates: 34°59′26″S 138°42′51″E
- Country: Australia
- State: South Australia
- Region: Adelaide Hills
- LGA: Adelaide Hills Council

Government
  - State electorate: Heysen
  - Federal division: Mayo

Population
  - Total: 2,006 (SAL 2021)
- Postcode: 5152
Suburbs around Crafers
| Cleland | Cleland | Summertown |
| Crafers West | Crafers | Piccadilly; Stirling |
| Crafers West | Stirling | Stirling |

The suburb of Crafers is in the Adelaide Hills to the south-east of Adelaide, South Australia, considered to be an outer suburb of Adelaide.

== History ==
Crafers was named after David Crafer, who arrived in Adelaide in 1838 and moved to the area. With his wife he established an inn, the Sawyers Arms, in 1839 three years after the colony of South Australia was created. He then built the Norfolk Arms on 16 acres (6 ha) in 1840 with banquet seating for 150. He moved to Adelaide and sold the Norfolk Arms in 1842, at which point it was known as The Crafers Inn. A new hotel was built on the site in 1880, remaining into the 21st century as The Crafers Inn, but the original building was burned down in 1926. At the time the area at the foot of nearby Mount Lofty was known as the Tiers, infamous for being the haunt of numerous Tiersmen and woodcutters on the run from authorities in Adelaide.

The historic Crafers Primary School was first established in the area in 1865 by Mr Edward Smith. The school was initially located in small premises in Atkinson Road, and then moved to its present location in Piccadilly Road in 1928. The historic stone and brick building was opened on 31 August of that year. The late 1970s saw extensive upgrading of the school facilities under Principal Allan Stanley-Smith, including construction of the Ruth Beare Hall in 1976 named after Ruth Beare who taught at the school from 1937 to 1944 and 1947 to 1975.

The Church of the Epiphany, Epiphany Place, Crafers has played a prominent role in the life of the district since it was built in 1878 on land donated by Henry Scott.

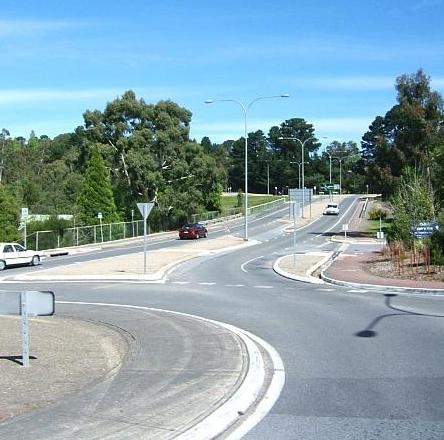
View of the Crafers Interchange

For many years Crafers was well known for being the start point of the South Eastern Freeway linking Adelaide with the town of Murray Bridge, and to the Princes Highway leading to Melbourne. It wasn't until 2000 that the Heysen Tunnels project was completed to extend the freeway to Glen Osmond on the outskirts of Adelaide. Prior to the tunnel opening, the winding road from Adelaide to Glen Osmond via Eagle On The Hill was frequently the scene of horrific vehicle accidents, often involving semi-trailers.

The Mount Lofty Botanic Garden is nestled in the hills behind Crafers. The gardens, opened in 1977, include an extensive mix of European and Australian native plants and are at their finest in the spring months.

On 16 February 1983, Crafers was hard hit by the Ash Wednesday bushfires. Many homes adjacent to bushland on the western side of the suburb were destroyed (as well as the Anglican theological college and priory of St Michael's House) as the fire came roaring out of the then Cleland National Park, and the devastation would have been much worse if a change in weather had not occurred right when the township of Crafers itself was being threatened. A memorial on Mount Lofty Summit is dedicated to those in the Adelaide Hills who lost their lives that day.

Crafers is under the administration of the Adelaide Hills Council, and is in the state electoral district of Bragg and the federal electorate of Mayo. Crafers West is in the state electoral district of Heysen.

== Transport ==
Crafers is well served by Adelaide Metro bus services throughout the day, every day. Routes that operate through Crafers are: 830F, T840, 841F, T842, 860F, 863, 863F, T863, 864, 864F and 865, which connect Crafers with the City. Route 830F then continues to Lobethal, routes T840, T842, 860F, 864 and 864F then continue to Mount Barker, routes 841F and T842 continue to Nairne. Routes 863, 863F, T863 and 865 continue to Stirling and Aldgate.

Routes that commence and terminate in Crafers are: 823, 865S, 866, 893 and 894. Route 823 continues to Mount Lofty and Cleland Wildlife Park. Routes 865S and 866 operate to Stirling and routes 893 and 894 operate to Blackwood interchange via Upper Sturt.

== See also ==
- Cleland National Park
