= Cleland, South Australia =

Cleland South Australia
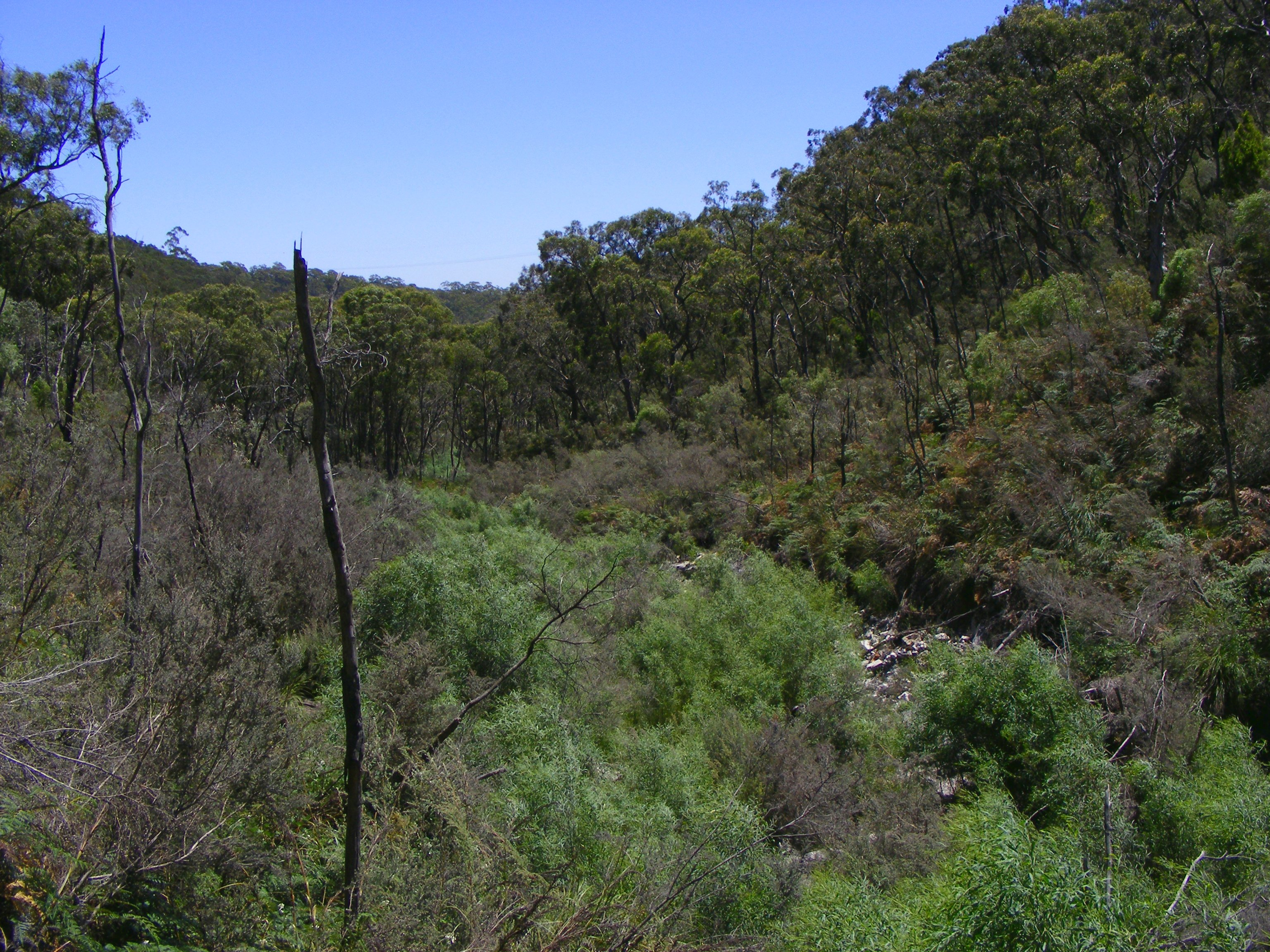
- Wilson's bog

- Coordinates: 34°58′06″S 138°41′42″E
- Population: 0 (SAL 2021)
- Established: 2001
- Postcode(s): 5152
- Time zone: ACST (UTC+9:30)
  - Summer (DST): ACST (UTC+10:30)
- Location: 10 km (6 mi) east of Adelaide city centre
- LGA(s): Adelaide Hills Council; City of Burnside
- State electorate(s): Bragg
- Federal division(s): Mayo
Mean max temp	Mean min temp	Annual rainfall
15.2 °C; 59 °F	8.5 °C; 47 °F	569.7 mm 22.4 in
Suburbs around Cleland:
Waterfall Gully	Greenhill	Greenhill
Waterfall Gully; Crafers West	Cleland	Summertown
Crafers West	Crafers West; Crafers	Crafers
- Footnotes: Locations; Adjoining suburbs

Cleland is a suburb in South Australia located in the Adelaide metropolitan area about 10 kilometres (6.2 miles) south-east of the Adelaide city centre. Its boundaries were created in October 2001, with additional land being added in 2010 from the adjoining suburb of Crafers. Its name is derived from the former Cleland Conservation Park (since November 2021 a national park known as Cleland National Park).

The principal land use within the locality is conservation with the majority of its land area being occupied by the Cleland National Park. Places within its extent include the summit of Mount Lofty. Cleland is located within the federal Division of Mayo, the state electoral district of Bragg and the local government areas of the Adelaide Hills Council and the City of Burnside.

== See also ==
- Cleland (disambiguation)
