= Cleeland =

Cleeland is a surname. Notable people with the surname include:

- Annabelle Cleeland, Australian politician
- Cam Cleeland (born 1975), American football player
- Peter Cleeland (1938–2007), Australian politician

== See also ==
- Cleland (surname)
