= Greenhill, South Australia =

Greenhill Adelaide, South Australia
- Coordinates: 34°57′02″S 138°41′27″E
- Population: 454 (SAL 2021)
- Established: 2001
- Postcode(s): 5140
- Location: 9.3 km (6 mi) east of Adelaide city centre
- LGA(s): Adelaide Hills Council
- State electorate(s): Heysen
- Federal division(s): Mayo
Mean max temp	Mean min temp	Annual rainfall
15.2 °C; 59 °F	8.5 °C; 47 °F	569.7 mm 22.4 in
Suburbs around Greenhill:
Stoneyfell	Stonyfell; Horsnell Gully	Ashton
Burnside	Greenhill	Uraidla; Summertown
Waterfall Gully	Cleland	Summertown
- Footnotes: Location; Adjoining suburbs

Greenhill is a suburb of Adelaide located about 9.3 kilometres (5.8 mi) east of the city centre in the foothills of the Adelaide Hills. Its boundaries were created in October 2001 in respect of the "long established name" with some land being moved into the adjoining suburb of Waterfall Gully in July 2002. The suburb includes Greenhill Recreation Park and the western slopes of Mount Lofty. Greenhill Creek flows through Waterfall Gully and feeds into First Creek.
