= John Cleland (disambiguation) =

John Cleland was an English novelist.

John Cleland may also refer to:

- John Cleland (racing driver) (born 1952), Scottish racing driver
- John Burton Cleland (1878–1971), South Australian microbiologist and naturalist
- John Fullerton Cleland (1821–1901), missionary in China and South Australian public servant
