= Clelland =

Clelland is a surname and Scottish clan. It is the surname of:

- David Clelland (born 1943), British Labour Party politician
- Eugene Clelland, fictional character on British television soap opera Coronation Street
- Jeanne N. Clelland, American mathematician
- James Clelland, Scottish labor activist, participant in the 1820 Battle of Bonnymuir
- John Clelland (1863–1944), Scottish international footballer
- John Clelland, founder in 1883 of Globe Store, Scranton, Pennsylvania
- Lana Clelland (born 1993), Scottish footballer
- Mike Clelland (born 1963), American Democratic Party politician
- Sarah Clelland (born 1997), Scottish footballer
- Scott Clelland, manager of Scottish football club Darvel F.C.

== See also ==
- Cleland (surname), a related surname
- Clelland Bar, one of the sites of the 1979 Glasgow pub bombings.
- Clelland House, a historic building in West Virginia
- Clelland F. Dodds (1826–1894), Mayor of Bloomington, Indiana
- Lady Maisry, a song (Child Ballad 65) also known as Susie Clelland
- McClelland, a related surname
