= Australia Live =

Australia Live was a four-hour telecast, broadcast live on the Nine Network, on 1 January 1988 to open Australia's Bicentennial celebrations. The telecast crossed live to over 70 locations right across the country (and some overseas) to represent a 'typical' day in the life of the Australian people. At each of the locations, Australian television celebrities talked with everyday Australians about their experiences, with the whole event anchored by Clive James, Ray Martin and Jana Wendt from the TCN-9 studios in Sydney. Other presenters included Paul Hogan, Tony Barber, George Negus, Derryn Hinch, Greg Evans, Daryl Somers and Graham Kennedy who billed the program as a "unique electronic carpet ride"

Locations were as diverse as Thursday Island in Queensland, Maatsuyker Island lighthouse in Tasmania, the Mount Lofty Fire Tower near Adelaide, Kings Cross in Sydney, The Lodge in Canberra, Kakadu National Park in the Northern Territory, and remote Kingoonya with a population of six in outback South Australia.

It was, at the time, a great achievement in television technology, if not in terms of the quality of the content. A number of crosses were made to people in remote locations from which live television had never been broadcast. These included the Indian Pacific passenger train on its way through the middle of Australia, a conversation (through a translator) with soviet cosmonauts who were orbiting the Earth, and, perhaps the most outstanding achievement, a live broadcast from the Davis Base in Antarctica.

The telecast included pre-recorded messages from world leaders including US President Ronald Reagan and British Prime Minister Margaret Thatcher. Australia Live was simultaneously broadcast on Channel Nine, ABC and SBS in Australia (as well as all regional stations), on Channel 4 in Britain, and on the A&E Network in the United States.

The broadcast ended with a rendition by Julie Anthony of the Australian national anthem at the Old Parliament House in Canberra with live fireworks displays from all of the Australian capital cities. The ABC later picked up the finale and played it at closedown until it began round-the-clock broadcasting in the 1990s.
