= Greenhill Recreation Park =

Protected area in South Australia

- IUCN category III (natural monument or feature)
- Location within South Australia
- Location: South Australia
- Nearest city: Adelaide city centre
- Coordinates: 34°56′43.08″S 138°40′26.04″E
- Area: 24 ha (59 acres)
- Established: 27 November 1952
- Governing body: Department for Environment and Water

Greenhill Creek Recreation Park is a protected area located in the Australian state of South Australia about 7 kilometres (4.3 miles) east of the Adelaide city centre in the suburb of Greenhill.

The land forming the recreation park which first received protected area status on 27 November 1952 as a national pleasure resort. The national pleasure resort was re-proclaimed under the National Parks and Wildlife Act 1972 as the Greenhill Recreation Park on 27 April 1972. As of 2018, it covered an area of 24 hectares (59 acres).

In 1980, it is described as having "a long history of grazing, clearing and bushfires", as having "vegetation consisting primarily of Eucalyptus odorata, E. leucoxylon and E obliqua open woodland over a largely introduced understorey of grasses, herbs and forbs" and its "principal value" is as "an excellent recreational lookout offering extensive views over Adelaide".

The recreation park is classified as an IUCN Category III protected area. In 1980, it was listed on the former Register of the National Estate.
