= John Fullerton Cleland =

John Fullerton Cleland (1821 – 29 November 1901) was a Protestant Christian missionary who served with the London Missionary Society during the late Qing dynasty China. He emigrated to South Australia, where he and his wife founded a family of considerable influence.

== History ==
Cleland was born in Edinburgh the only son of barrister William Lennox Cleland (c. 1798–1832) and Henrietta Cleland, née Fullerton, who married in 1816.

W. Lennox Cleland, who had a practice in Calcutta, drowned in the Hooghly River and his widow married again in 1836, to Dr. Thomas Glen (died 1844). John Fullerton Cleland's sister Margaret Fraser Cleland married (later Sir) Samuel Davenport and emigrated to South Australia in 1843. Thomas Glen's sons George and Tom also emigrated to South Australia aboard Templar in 1845 and joined the Davenports in Macclesfield. George married Bishop Short's daughter Millecent, for whom the town of Millicent was (mis)named. Henrietta emigrated to South Australia aboard Yatala in 1868 and lived in some style at "Ferndale", Beaumont.

On leaving school Cleland joined the East India Company as a midshipman aboard Reliance. He left the company for service with the London and Counties Bank; Reliance was wrecked near Boulogne in November 1842, shortly after. He married Thomas Glen's daughter Elizabeth in 1845 and they went out to China as missionaries. Their first two children, William Lennox and Margaret Henrietta were born in Hong Kong in 1847 and 1848, and son John was born in Canton in 1850. Then Cleland suffered sunstroke, and the family returned to England and settled in Taunton, where George Fullerton Cleland was born in 1852. They then left for South Australia aboard Gloucester, arriving in August 1852, and settled in a prefabricated home brought out from India by Edward Gleeson on a property dubbed "Gleeville", at 1 Dashwood Road, Beaumont. The two older children died in 1854 after suffering scarlet fever followed by dropsy. They had five more children, all boys.

Cleland was appointed Registrar of Births, Marriages and Deaths in 1853, and held the position until 1885, when he resigned at the request of the Government, to be replaced by Dr. H. T. Whittell. Elizabeth died on 4 November 1895; he died on 29 November 1901 and was survived by six sons:

== Family ==
- Dr. (William) Lennox Cleland (18 January 1847 – 5 November 1918) married Matilda Lauder "Mattie" Burton (1848 – 1928) on 21 June 1877, Colonial Surgeon of Parkside, South Australia; 40 years in charge of Parkside Lunatic Asylum. She was a daughter of John Hill Burton.

- Sir John Burton Cleland MB ChM (22 June 1878 – 11 August 1971) married Dora Isabel Paton (1880–1955) on 25 April 1908. A noted naturalist, Cleland National Park is named for him.

- Dr Margaret Burton Cleland MRCS FRACP (1909–2004) married Dr John Patrick Horan (1907–1993) MD FRCP FRACP;
- Dr William Paton 'Bill' Cleland MB FRCP FRCS (1912–2005) married Norah Goodhart (1919–1994)
- Joan Burton Cleland (c. 1915–2000) married Erskine Norman Paton (1922–1985) became an ornithologist;
- Elizabeth Robson Cleland (16 October 1910 – 31 January 2005) married (Alfred) Moxon Simpson CBE (17 November 1910 – 11 November 2001) on 3 August 1938. Moxon was a son of Alfred Allen Simpson. Elizabeth Simpson was author of

The Hahndorf Walkers Beaumont Press, Adelaide 1983 ISBN 0-9592458-0-4
The Clelands of Beaumont Beaumont Press, Adelaide 1986 ISBN 0-9592458-1-2
Beaumont House: The land and its people Beaumont Press, Adelaide 1993 ISBN 0-9592458-2-0

- Barbara Burton Cleland (1913–?), a mathematics graduate, married Prof Andrew John La Nauze (9 June 1911 – 20 August 1990)

- Julia Mary La Nauze (29 January 1942 – ) married Ian Peter Griffith. She was a noted microbiologist

- William Lauder Cleland BSc (19 July 1882 – 6 October 1946) married Amelia Adelaide Louise "Millie" Beasley (1882 – 15 April 1914) on 5 February 1908. He married again, to Marjorie Harbron ( – 1975) in 1919

- William Lauder "Will" Cleland (1920 – ) married Naomi Hamilton Stevenson ( – ) on 27 May 1943. He served with RAAF during WWII. Frequently mis-spelled William Lander Cleland.
- John Lennox Cleland (9 January 1922 – 2 September 1948) born Newcastle NSW
- James Lindsay Cleland (30 June 1928 – 15 August 2017)

- G(eorge) Fullerton Cleland (c. 1852 – 10 July 1931) married Amy Giles (c. 1852 – 26 February 1938) on 22 January 1878; he was a wine merchant of Adelaide, chairman of Burnside District Council 1887; she was the daughter of merchant Henry Giles. They lived at "Braemar", Mount Lofty.

- Henry Fullerton Cleland (August 1878 – 13 September 1904)
- Leslie Glen Cleland (1880 – 1963) married Fleta Vincent Nesbit ( – 1968) in 1907
- Margaret Fraser Cleland (1882 – )
- Gladys Olive Cleland (1885 – ) married E(dgar) Alwyn Wood (1884 – ) on 28 September 1912
- Dulcibel Erskine Cleland (1887 – 1968) married Charles Henry Edmonds ( – ) on 9 September 1914
- Joan Jocelyn Cleland (1889 – 1949) married Karl Friedrich/Frederick Timcke (1885 – 3 December 1924) on 22 June 1918.
- Amy Beatrice Cleland (19 November 1890 – 24 February 1936) married William Shine ( – ), lived in Queensland
- George Fullerton Cleland (1892 – 15 July 1950) married Gladys Amy Disher (1892 – 1972) on 12 April 1915
- Una Phyllis Cleland (1894 – ) married Thomas Henry Childs (1900 – ) on 9 July 1929, lived in Queensland
- Doris Isabel "Dic" Cleland (1896 – 1976) married Eric Arnold Tilemann (1894 – 1950) in 1923
- Harold Myles Cleland (1898 – 4 July 1918). With 1st AIF, killed in France.

- E(lphinstone) Davenport Cleland (1854 – 1 October 1928) married Susan Blood Hobbs, née Davies, ( – 26 December 1898) on 16 January 1879; he married again, to Anne Emily "Annie" Mackinnon ( – 12 April 1944) on 14 August 1900; he was a journalist then mine manager in Broken Hill then Coolgardie, died in West Perth.

- Elizabeth "Bess" Cleland (19 December 1879 – 27 December 1945) served as nursing sister WWI.
- Samuel Davenport Cleland (11 January 1885 – 14 January 1919) fought in WWI; died of wounds received in France.
- Sir Donald Mackinnon Cleland (28 June 1901 – 1975) married Rachel Evans ( – ) on 18 December 1928. He was administrator of Papua New Guinea.
- William McLeod "Bill" Cleland (14 April 1903 – 1975) married Margaret Manford in 1933. He was manager, then owner, Glenorn Station near Leonora, Western Australia; a champion tennis player
- Lennox Cleland (1907 – 1968) married Joan Cavanagh in 1935. He was a leading member of Perth Repertory Club, then with Mathison Lang company. He was a director of Distillers Ltd.

- Charles Alexander Cleland (December 1865 – 23 February 1927) married Ethel Mary Dutton ( – ) on 5 February 1891; he was an Adelaide surveyor; she was daughter of Edward Dutton. They had no children.
- Allan Fraser Cleland (June 1867 – 25 December 1927) married (Frances) Mabel Gardner (1867 – 1953) on 12 September 1893; he was a railway engineer in Queensland, later of Kurrawong, Western Australia then Swanbourne, Western Australia. They had no children.
- E(dward) Erskine Cleland (7 April 1869 – 1 July 1943) married Edith Mary Auld (1867 – 25 August 1928) on 12 April 1893; he was a solicitor, then judge; she was only daughter of W. P. Auld; lived on East Terrace, Adelaide, Church Terrace, Walkerville

- Tom Erskine Cleland (9 March 1894 – )
- Isabel Erskine "Bobs" Cleland (1900 – 1963) married Alfred Chambers Lucas (1896 – 1997) in August 1930
- Audrey Erskine Cleland (10 September 1903 – 1981)

The Beaumont Clelands were distantly related to Professor Sir John Cleland FRS (1835–1925) of University of Glasgow (the Professor and William Lennox Cleland had the same great-grandfather)

John Cleland (13 November 1848 – 23 August 1936), Northern Territory pioneer and hero of the SS Gothenburg shipwreck was not a close relative.

== Sources ==
- Broomhall, Alfred (1982). Hudson Taylor and China's Open Century: Barbarians at the Gates. London: Hodder and Stoughton.
- Alexander Wylie (1867). Memorials of Protestant Missionaries to the Chinese: Giving a List of Their Publications, and Obituary Notices of the Deceased. With Copious Indexes. American Presbyterian Mission Press.
