= 1980 Ash Wednesday bushfires =

Series of bushfires in Australia

Ash Wednesday I
- Date: 20 February 1980
- Location: Adelaide Hills, South Australia
- Coordinates: 34.91°S 138.71°E

Statistics
- Burned area: 3,770 ha (14.6 mi^{2})

Impacts
- Injuries: 40 civilians
- Structures destroyed: 51 homes; 25 outbuildings; 75 farms damaged
- Cost: $34,000,000

Ignition
- Cause: Faulty power lines, arson, and negligence after years of extreme drought

Map
- Location within South Australia

The first Ash Wednesday fires were a series of bushfires that began in the Adelaide Hills, South Australia, on Ash Wednesday, 20 February 1980. 51 homes and 25 other buildings were destroyed, including the Anglican Christ Church, Longwood, and 75 farms were affected. 40 people were injured, with 150 left homeless. The fire burnt an area of 3,770 ha (14.6 mi^{2}), and caused an estimated $34,000,000 damage.

In 1983, after the Ash Wednesday fires in February that year, the 1980 fire became known in South Australia as the "first" Ash Wednesday, or Ash Wednesday I.
