= James Cleland =

James Cleland may refer to:

- James Cleland (footballer) (1869–1942), Scottish footballer
- James Cleland (politician) (1839–1908), Member of the Ontario Legislative Assembly
- James Cleland (statistician) (1770–1840), Scottish statistician and historical writer
- James Dowsett Rose Cleland (1767–1852), Irish naturalist and estate owner
- James T. Cleland, former Dean of Duke Chapel
- James William Cleland (1874–1914), Scottish Liberal Party politician and barrister
