= Hance Cleland =

American politician

H. H. Cleland
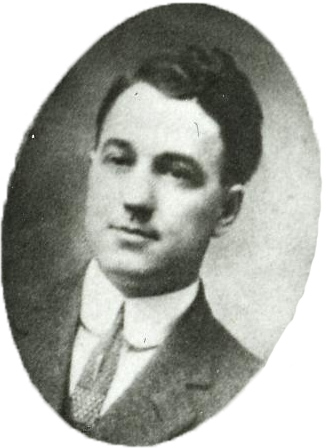
- Cleland in 1913

Member of the Washington House of Representatives for the 5th district
- In office 1913–1915

Personal details
- Born: October 4, 1884 Illinois, United States
- Died: October 23, 1959 (aged 75) San Diego County, California, United States
- Party: Republican

Hance H. Cleland (October 4, 1884 – October 23, 1959) was an American politician in the state of Washington. He served in the Washington House of Representatives.
