= Mount Bonython =

Mountain in South Australia

- Little Mount
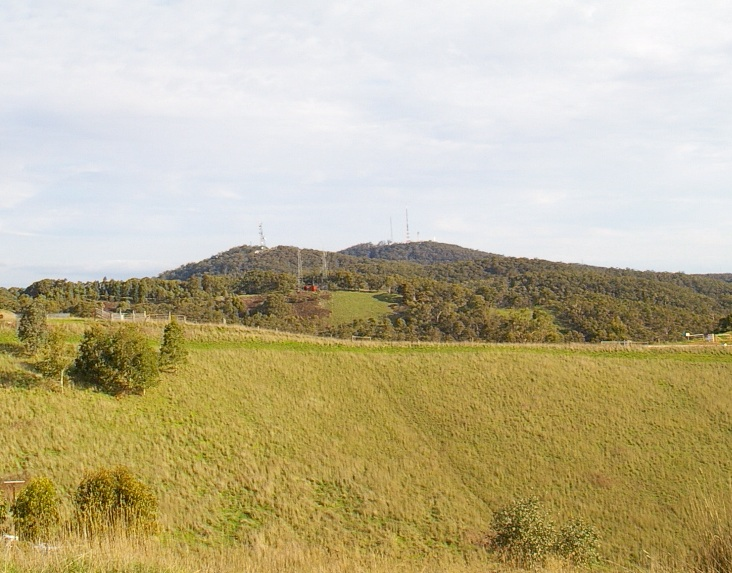
- The summit from the north; Mount Lofty is behind to the right

Highest point
- Elevation: 677 m (2,221 ft)
- Parent peak: Mount Lofty
- Coordinates: 34°58′0″S 138°42′50″E

Geography
- Location within South Australia
- Location: South Australia, Australia

Mount Bonython (34°58′0″S 138°42′50″E, 677 m (2,221 ft) above sea level) is one of two major peaks in the Adelaide Hills visible from Adelaide. The other, about a kilometre to the south and some 50 m higher, is Mount Lofty. Mount Bonython is named after Sir John Langdon Bonython and was previously known simply as Little Mount. There is a telecommunications tower used for the Telstra NextG network located at its summit.

According to the mythology of the indigenous Kaurna people, the Mount Lofty Ranges were part of the story of the ancestor-creator Nganno. Nganno travelled across the land of the Kaurna and after being wounded in a battle, lay down to die and formed the Mount Lofty Ranges. The current name of the Greater Mount Lofty Parklands, Yurrebilla, is taken from the Kaurna name for the twin hills of Mount Lofty and Mount Bonython, which are supposed to be Nganno's ears.

== See also ==
- List of mountains in Australia
