= E. Davenport Cleland =

Elphinstone Davenport Cleland (1854 – 1 October 1928) was a journalist and mine manager in South Australia and Western Australia.

== History ==
Cleland was born at Beaumont, South Australia in 1854, the third surviving son of John Fullerton Cleland (1821 – 29 November 1901) and his wife Elizabeth Cleland née Glen (c. 1825 – 4 November 1895).

Shortly after marrying he took over management of Yanyarrie station, between Orroroo and Hawker, which he left in 1880, and with brother (George) Fullerton Cleland leased land at Cleland's Gully near Tooperang, where they ran sheep. They gave up the lease to uncle (later Sir) Samuel Davenport in 1885. Around this time he and his brother G. F. Cleland were active members of the University Shakespeare Society. He found employment in the office of the Government Geologist 1887 or earlier, and around this time was appointed Justice of the Peace. He was involved in mounting the South Australian mining exhibit at the Adelaide Jubilee International Exhibition of 1887, featuring gold nuggets from the Teetulpa field.

His job had taken him to Teetulpa early in the field's exploitation, and he sent eye-witness accounts to the South Australian Register, as well as The Argus and Sydney Morning Herald. In 1888 he went to Broken Hill, where he acted as local agent for the Register then as a journalist with The Silver Age, and succeeded John Ward as editor, living on Williams Street. He added greatly to his childhood mineral collection, later donated to University of Adelaide.

In late 1891 he was appointed general manager of Australian Broken Hill Consols mine, which he resigned in 1894 to take up a position in Coolgardie, Western Australia as general manager of J. S. Reid's properties. In 1900 he became manager of Bayley's Reward mine, general manager of Bayley's Mine Limited in 1904, then manager of Gold Mines Ltd. in 1905. When the Chambers of Mines of Coolgardie and Kalgoorlie combined as Chamber of Mines of WA he was elected to the executive council. He was a founder and first treasurer of the Institute of Mining Engineers, serving until 1906. In 1906 he was appointed Inspector of Mines, with a residence at Peppermint Grove, Perth.

He succeeded the R. A. Varden as manager of the Boulder Perseverance mine, and held that position until he retired in 1923 and went to reside in Guildford until 1925, when he moved to Ventnor Avenue, West Perth.

== Publications ==
- He wrote many stories and articles for the Adelaide Observer starting with A Life's Punishment and Clarissa's Lovers, in December 1886, through to The Cycle Express and The Writing on the Wall for Tatler in 1925. He was a member of the Adelaide University Shakespeare Society, and contributed several articles to its club magazine.
- Cleland, E. Davenport (Elphinstone Davenport) (1891), The white kangaroo : a tale of colonial life, founded on fact, Wells Gardner, Darton
- Cleland, E. Davenport (Elphinstone Davenport); Chamber of Mines of Western Australia (1911), West Australian mining practice : a description of the mining methods followed by the principal gold mines of Western Australia, Chamber of Mines of Western Australia

== Family ==
E. D. Cleland (1854 – 1 October 1928) married Susan (E.S. has Susannah) Blood Hobbs, née Davies, ( – 26 December 1898) on 16 January 1879; he married again, to Anne Emily "Annie" Mackinnon ( – 12 April 1944) on 14 August 1900. Their children included:

- Elizabeth "Bess" Cleland (19 December 1879 – 27 December 1945) served as nursing sister in WWI.
- Samuel Davenport Cleland (11 January 1885 – 14 January 1919) fought in WWI; died of wounds received in France.
- Sir Donald Mackinnon Cleland (28 June 1901 – 1975) married Rachel Evans ( – ) on 18 December 1928. He was administrator of Papua New Guinea. She was author of Pathways to Independence.
- William McLeod "Bill" Cleland (14 April 1903 – 1975) married Margaret Manford in 1933. He was manager, then owner, Glenorn Station near Leonora, Western Australia; a champion tennis player
- Lennox Lachlan Cleland (1907 – 1968) married Joan Cavanagh in 1935. He was a leading member of Perth Repertory Club, then with Mathison Lang company. He was a director of Distillers Ltd.

== Source ==
Simpson, E. R. (Elizabeth R.) (1986), The Clelands of Beaumont : a history of 26 generations of a South Australian family, Beaumont Press, ISBN 978-0-9592458-1-3

== See also ==
Alfred Thomas Chandler, another geologist/journalist, who worked on J. M. Smith's Goldfield Courier and Golden Age then Coolgardie Miner
