= Jane Cleland-Huang =

Software engineer

Jane Cleland-Huang is a software engineer whose research involves requirements engineering, requirements traceability, the safety engineering of cyber-physical systems, and agile software development, including work on air traffic control for unmanned aerial vehicles. Originally from England, she works in the US as Frank M. Freimann Professor of Computer Science, Chair of the Department of Computer Science and Engineering at the University of Notre Dame, and director of the Software and Requirements Engineering Research Lab.

== Education and career ==
Cleland-Huang grew up in Southern England, and briefly studied speech–language pathology in university before leaving England to work as an English teacher in Vietnamese refugee camps in Thailand, formed as part of the Indochina refugee crisis of the late 1970s. She continued her work in Kolkata, India, and married a coworker, an American of Chinese descent. Returning with him to the US, she began working as a self-taught computer programmer for a private university in Hawaii before moving to Chicago, raising a family, and going back to school to study computer science. She eventually earned a bachelor's degree from Governors State University and a Ph.D. from the University of Illinois Chicago.

After taking a faculty position at DePaul University, she moved to Notre Dame in 2016. She was named as the Freimann Professor in 2022.

== Books ==
Cleland-Huang is the coauthor of Software by Numbers: Low-Risk, High-Return Development (with Mark Denne, Prentice-Hall, 2004). She is the co-editor of Software and Systems Traceability (with Orlena Gotel and Andrea Zisman, Springer, 2012).
