= Ash Wednesday bushfires =

1983 brushfires in Australia

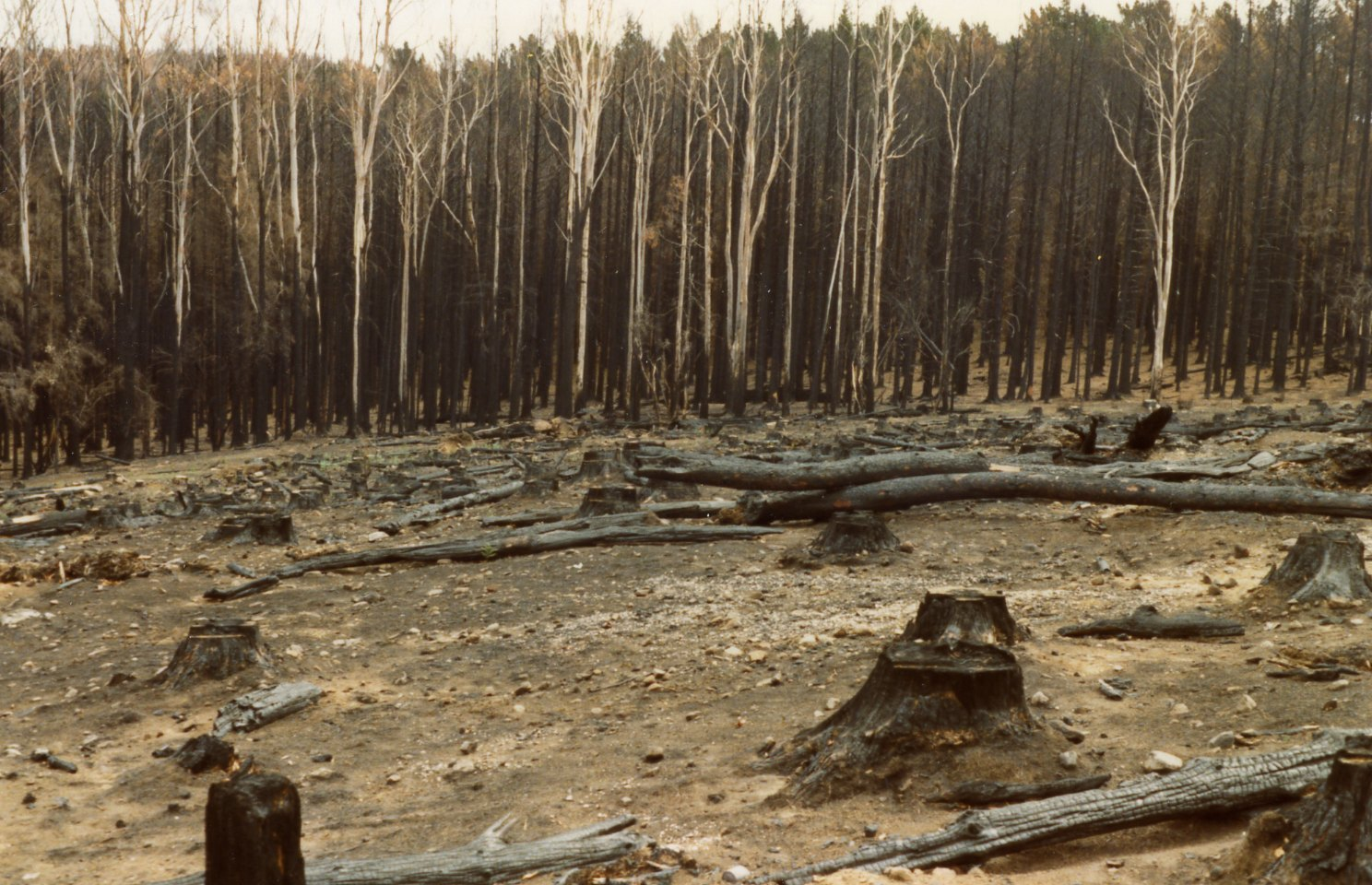
- Aftermath of the 1983 Ash Wednesday bushfires at Mount Macedon
- Date: 16 February 1983
- Location: Australia: Victoria and South Australia

Statistics
- Burned area: 2,080 km^{2} (513,979 acres) in South Australia and 9,954 square kilometres (2.46 million acres) in Victoria on one day; 5,200 square kilometres (1.28 million acres) burnt throughout the 1982/83 season
- Land use: Urban/rural fringe areas, farmland and forest reserve

Impacts
- Deaths: 75 (47 – Victoria) (28 – South Australia)
- Injuries: 2,676

Ignition
- Cause: Faulty powerlines, arson, and negligence after years of extreme drought 3,700 homes and buildings lost

The Ash Wednesday bushfires, known in South Australia as Ash Wednesday II, were a series of bushfires that occurred in south-eastern Australia in 1983 on 16 February. Within twelve hours, more than 180 fires fanned by hot winds of up to 110 km/h (68 mph) caused widespread destruction across the states of Victoria and South Australia. Years of severe drought and extreme weather combined to create one of Australia's worst fire days in a century. The fires were the deadliest in Australian history until the Black Saturday bushfires in 2009.

75 people died as a result of the fires; 47 in Victoria, and 28 in South Australia. This included 14 Country Fire Authority and three Country Fire Service personnel, all 17 were volunteer firefighters. Many fatalities were as a result of firestorm conditions caused by a sudden and violent wind change in the evening which rapidly changed the direction and size of the fire front. The speed and ferocity of the flames, aided by abundant fuels and a landscape immersed in smoke, made fire suppression and containment impossible. In many cases, residents fended for themselves as fires broke communications, cut off escape routes and severed electricity and water supplies. Up to 8,000 people were evacuated in Victoria at the height of the crisis and a state of disaster was declared for the first time in South Australia's history.

A 2001 report found Ash Wednesday to be one of Australia's worst fires. More than 3,700 buildings were destroyed or damaged and 2,545 individuals and families lost their homes. Livestock losses were very high, with more than 340,000 sheep, 18,000 cattle and numerous native animals either dead or later destroyed. A total of 4,540 insurance claims were paid totalling A$176 million with a total estimated cost of well over A$400 million (1983 values) for both states, equivalent to A$1.3 billion in 2007. The emergency saw the largest number of volunteers called to duty from across Australia at the same time—an estimated 130,000 firefighters, defence force personnel, relief workers and support crews.

== Backgrounds ==
=== 1980 South Australian bushfires ===
On Ash Wednesday in 1980 (20 February) during a virtually rainless summer after a very wet spring in 1979, bushfires swept through the Adelaide Hills in South Australia, destroying 51 houses. These fires were referred to as "Ash Wednesday" until the 1983 fires, which became notorious nationwide.

=== El Niño ===
As 1982 came to a close, large areas of eastern Australia lay devastated by a prolonged drought thought to be caused by the El Niño climatic cycle. In many places, rainfall over winter and spring had been as little as half the previous record low in a record dating back to the 1870s and severe water restrictions were imposed in Melbourne in November. On 24 November, the earliest Total Fire Ban in forty years was proclaimed in Victoria. By February 1983, summer rainfall for Victoria was up to 75% less than in previous years. The first week of February was punctuated by intense heat, with record-high temperatures experienced on 1 and 8 February. This combination further destabilised an already volatile fire situation in the forested upland areas surrounding the Victorian and South Australian capitals of Melbourne and Adelaide.

=== Early fire season ===
Victorian Government firefighting agencies employed extra staff and organised for extra equipment and aircraft to be ready for firefighting over the summer. The first big bushfire occurred on 25 November 1982 and was followed by large fires on 3 and 13 December 1982. Even before 16 February, fires were already causing destruction in Victoria. An ongoing fire near Cann River in the state's east had been burning uncontrolled for almost a month. Prior to that, a major bushfire on 8 January had taken hold north of Bacchus Marsh in the Wombat State Forest where two Forest Commission workers lost their lives defending Greendale. On 1 February 1983, a fire burnt the north face of Mount Macedon and areas of state forest. Fifty houses were destroyed. These fires were already creating a strain on firefighting resources. In the 1982/83 season, 3500 fires were reported to the Country Fire Authority in Victoria alone.

=== Dust storm ===
On 8 February, Melbourne was enveloped by a giant dust storm. The dust cloud was over 300 metres (980 ft) high, 500 kilometres (310 mi) long and was composed of an estimated 50,000 tonnes (49,000 long tons; 55,000 short tons) of topsoil from the drought-ravaged Wimmera and Mallee areas of north-west Victoria. Leading a dry cool change and preceded by record temperatures, the dust storm cut visibility in Melbourne to 100 metres, creating near darkness for almost an hour.

There was also a dust storm in Adelaide on the day of the bushfires.

== Events of 16 February ==
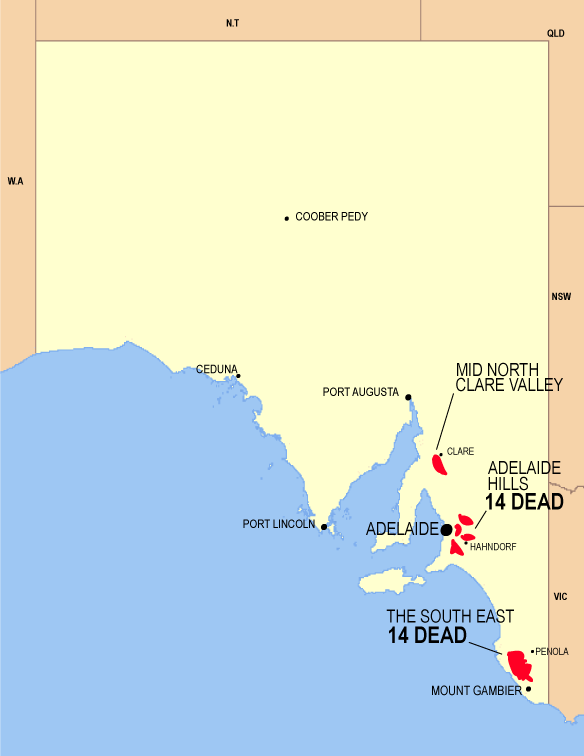
Map of fire affected areas in South Australia

Wednesday 16 February dawned as another unrelentingly hot, dry day. The weather early on Ash Wednesday was complex and did not signify how the day would develop. A front separated hot, dry air coming in from the interior to the north, from cooler air moving eastwards from the Southern Ocean. Ahead of the front were hot, turbulent, gale-force northerly winds. Temperatures around Melbourne and Adelaide quickly rose above 43 °C (109 °F), with winds gusting up to 100 km/h (62 mph) and relative humidity plunging to as low as 6 per cent. From mid-morning, McArthur's fire danger index was in excess of 100 in several places in Victoria and South Australia. It would be one of the worst fire weather days in south-east Australia since the disastrous Black Friday bushfires in 1939.

The first fire was reported at 11:30 am at McLaren Flat, south of Adelaide. Within hours, multiple reports of breaking fires quickly began to deluge Victoria's and South Australia's emergency services. In Victoria alone, 180 fires were reported, eight of which became major fires. At one stage, the entire Melbourne metropolitan area was encircled by an arc of fire. Property loss began early in the afternoon, particularly in the Adelaide Hills, east of Adelaide and the Dandenong Ranges, east of Melbourne.

Murray Nicoll, a journalist from radio station 5DN and resident of the Adelaide Hills, reported live from his local area where five people died:

At the moment, I'm watching my house burn down. I'm sitting out on the road in front of my own house where I've lived for 13 or 14 years and it's going down in front of me. And the flames are in the roof and—Oh, God damn it. It's just beyond belief—my own house. And everything around it is black. There are fires burning all around me. All around me. And the front section of my house is blazing. The roof has fallen in. My water tanks are useless. There is absolutely nothing I can do about it.

Mount Lofty Summit Road is lined by a number of historic mansions, like Eurilla, Carminow and Mount Lofty House. The flames roared up the tower of Carminow like a chimney, destroying everything, including the gardens. Next door at Eurilla, Kym and Julie Bonython lost all of their worldly possessions, including antiques, paintings and Kym Bonython's extensive jazz record collection. He saved only his favourite motorbike. At this time, this part of the Adelaide Hills was still not connected to the mains water supply, so all of the houses had only petrol-powered pumps and rainwater tanks. "The petrol in the emergency pump just vaporised with the heat" said Kym Bonython. "We could do nothing except watch the place burn". Across the road at Pine Lodge (formerly the Mt Lofty Tea Rooms), the resident rolled out the property's fire hose, connected it to the working diesel pump, only to find that embers were already burning numerous holes in the hose, rendering it useless. Down the road at Mount Lofty House, Mr and Mrs James Morgan lost $150,000 worth of furniture and artwork, which they had moved into the huge house only a fortnight before the fires, when they purchased the property.

At 3:15 pm on Wednesday, Mr and Mrs Morgan went to pick up their children from the local school and kindergarten. "Three quarters of an hour later the roof was burning", said Mr Morgan. Flames across the road and road blocks prevented the family from returning to the house, until it was burnt to the ground. "It's worth nothing now", said Mr Morgan. All of these houses have since been restored and are privately owned. Mount Lofty House has since been turned into a boutique hotel. St Michael's House, a mansion converted to an Anglican theological college and priory in the 1940s, was also burnt in the fires, but not restored and the whole site has since been cleared, leaving only the ruins of the gate house.

More than 60 per cent of the houses lost in South Australia were in the Mount Lofty Ranges. Of the 26 people who died in South Australia, 12 were in metropolitan areas, including four in the Adelaide suburb of Greenhill.

=== Wind change ===
The most disastrous factor in the Ash Wednesday fires occurred just before nightfall when a fierce and dry wind change swept across South Australia and Victoria. This abruptly changed the direction and dramatically increased the intensity of the fires. The long corridors of flame that had been driven all day by the strong northerly were suddenly hit by gale-force south-westerly winds and became enormous fire fronts, many kilometres wide, with wind reportedly moving faster than 110 km/h (68 mph).

The near-cyclonic strength of the wind change created an unstoppable firestorm that produced tornado-like fire whirls and fireballs of eucalyptus gas measuring over three metres across. Survivors reported that the roar of the fire front was similar to that of a jet engine, though multiplied fifty, a hundred times. The change in temperature and air pressure was so savage that houses were seen exploding before fire could touch them. A resident of Aireys Inlet, on Victoria's western coast, was quoted:

It was just this bloody great force. It wasn't fire by itself. It wasn't just the wind. It was something different to that ... a monster.

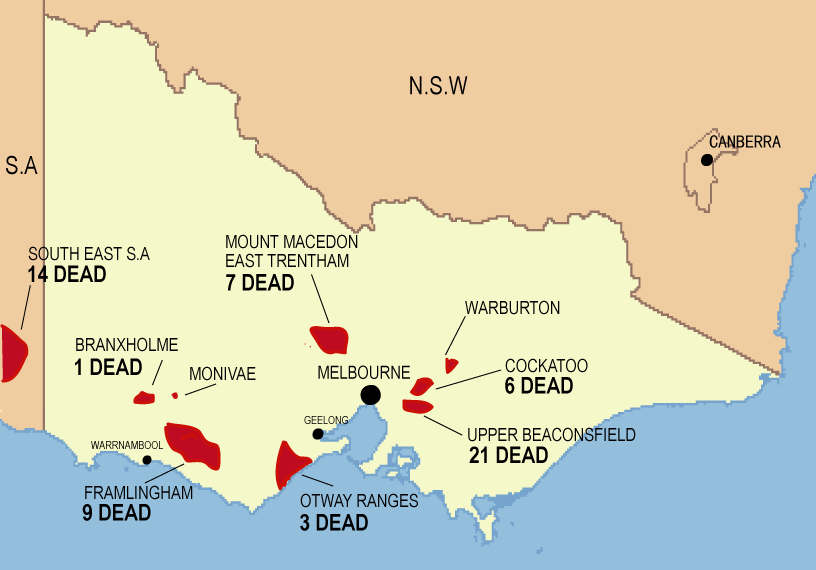
Map of fire affected areas in Victoria

Unusual phenomena arising from the extreme conditions were reported. One survivor was startled to see a burning mattress hurtling through the air. Others noted road surfaces that bubbled and caught fire. CSIRO experts later reported that, from evidence of melted metal, the heat of the fires after the change rose to 2,000 °C (3,630 °F), exceeding that recorded during the Allied bombing of Dresden in World War II. In fact, the Ash Wednesday fires were measured at around 60,000 kilowatts of heat energy per metre, leading to similarities with the atomic bomb dropped on Hiroshima.

Whole townships were obliterated in minutes. In the Dandenong Ranges, the villages of Cockatoo and Upper Beaconsfield were devastated, with twelve volunteer firefighters losing their lives after being trapped by a wall of flame when the wind change struck, while parts of Belgrave Heights (where this fire started) and Belgrave South suffered large areas of property loss.

Most of Macedon and much of historic Mount Macedon to the north-west of Melbourne was razed, including many heritage-listed 19th-century mansions and famed gardens.

A fire that started in Deans Marsh raced into the Otway Forest. When the wind change happen the fire formed a huge front and headed for the coast. Burning all night, the morning after Ash Wednesday, first light revealed the devastation of the popular coastal towns along the Great Ocean Road such as Aireys Inlet, Anglesea and Lorne resembled barren moonscapes. The fire on the coast had been so intense that firefighters were forced to abandon all control efforts and let it burn until it reached the ocean, destroying everything in its path. Residents were forced down to the water edge of beaches in the areas to escape the flames.

In Victoria, over 16,000 firefighters combatted the blaze, including staff and works crews from the Forests Commission Victoria, National Park Service, and volunteers from the Country Fire Authority and State Emergency Service. Also involved were over 1,000 Victoria Police, 500 Australian Defence Force personnel and hundreds of local residents. A variety of equipment was used, including 400 vehicles (fire-trucks, water tankers and dozers), 11 helicopters and 14 fixed wing aircraft.

The total land area burnt was approximately 2,100 km^{2} (520,000 acres; 210,000 hectares) in Victoria and 2,080 km^{2} (510,000 acres; 208,000 hectares) in South Australia. The summer bushfires of 1982/1983 razed approximately 5,200 km^{2} (1.3 million acres; 520,000 hectares).

== Aftermath ==
Many of the Victorian fires were thought to have been caused by sparks between short-circuiting power lines, and tree branches connecting with power lines. A systematic review of fire safety was undertaken; areas under high-tension pylons were cleared and local domestic lines considered to be at risk were replaced with insulated three-phase supply lines.

In South Australia, an inquest into the fires found that the communication systems used by the Country Fire Service were inadequate and, as a result, the government radio network was installed, although this did not happen until almost 20 years later. Improvements in weather forecasting, with particular reference to wind changes and fronts, was undertaken by the Bureau of Meteorology. An emergency disaster plan, known as Displan, was also legislated. Many of the lessons learned in building better homes for fire survival, bush management and emergency response efficiency in analysis of the fires conducted by the CSIRO were to prove vital in later crises, including the 1994 Eastern seaboard and 2003 Canberra fire outbreaks.

A study was conducted into the 32 fatalities (excluding firefighters) that occurred in Victoria. It revealed that 25 were outside their homes, several of whom died in vehicles while attempting to escape the conflagration. It was found that delaying evacuation until the last minute was a common failing.

== Legacy ==
Until the 2009 Black Saturday bushfires, Ash Wednesday had the highest-recorded death toll for a bushfire disaster, with 75 deaths. For the next quarter century, Ash Wednesday was used as the measure for all bushfire emergencies in Australia; though since 2009, that has been supplemented by the lessons learned from Black Saturday. It remains well known as one of the worst natural disasters in Australia's history.

Many psychological studies were undertaken in the months and years after the fire and found that the events left many in the affected communities with the effects of post-traumatic stress disorder, even 20 years after the disaster in 2003.

The lasting impact of Ash Wednesday was highlighted in 2008, when its 25th anniversary received much public and media attention. Commemoration sites have been set up in areas that were hit worst by the fires, with museums hosting exhibits inviting survivors to tell their stories.

== Areas affected in Victoria ==
Area/town	Area (km^{2})	Fatalities	Buildings destroyed
Cudgee & Ballangeich	500	9	872
Otway Ranges	410	3	782
Warburton	400	0	57
East Trentham & Mount Macedon	295	7	628
Belgrave Heights & Upper Beaconsfield	92	21	238
Monivae	31.81	0	3
Cockatoo	18	6	307
Branxholme	2	1	10
Source: Victorian Government Department of Sustainability and Environment

== See also ==
- List of disasters in Australia by death toll
- South Australian Country Fire Service
- Country Fire Authority (Victoria)
- Mount Lofty (South Australia, location of one of the SA fires)
- Black Friday bushfires
- 1967 Tasmanian fires
- Black Saturday bushfires
- 2015 Sampson Flat bushfires
