= Bruce Cleland =

Scottish footballer

Personal information
- Date of birth: 26 September 1958 (age 68)
- Place of birth: Paisley, Scotland
- Position: Forward

Youth career
- Maryhill

Senior career*
Years	Team	Apps	(Gls)
1977–1979	Albion Rovers	43	(25)
1979–1983	Motherwell	67	(25)
1982–1983	→ Ayr United (loan)	3	(1)
1983–1984	Barrow		
1984	Queen of the South	1	(0)
1984–1986	Albion Rovers	61	(4)
1986–1988	Stranraer	55	(21)
- East Kilbride Thistle
Total		230	(76)
- * Club domestic league appearances and goals

Bruce Cleland (born 26 September 1958) is a Scottish former professional footballer who played as a forward.

== Career ==
Born in Paisley, Cleland played for Maryhill, Albion Rovers, Motherwell, Ayr United, Barrow, Queen of the South, Stranraer and East Kilbride Thistle.
