= James Dowsett Rose =

Irish malacologist

James Dowsett Rose from 1784 as James Dowsett Rose Cle[a]land (24 March 1767 – 25 September 1852) was an Irish naturalist. He built up a large collection of molluscs from Ireland.

== Early and personal life ==
Rose was born in Fort St. David, Cuddalore, to Lt. Richard Rose (1741–7 June 1768) and Agnes (born Cleland, 1740–75). After the death of his father in 1768 following injuries in the Siege of Atoor, he was taken to England. He took the name of Clealand in 1784 on inheriting Clealand estates in County Down.

He married Sarah, daughter of William Eaton Andrews in 1790 and they had a son and a daughter. After her death in 1830, he married Elizabeth, daughter of William Nicholson-Steele-Nicholson and they had four sons and three daughters.

In 1788 he was involved in founding a Sunday School in Rathgael. In 1816 he founded a Parochial Ploughing Society of Ireland and served as a Justice of the Peace.

== Scholarship ==
Rose was an honorary member of the Belfast Natural History Society from 1821. He collected molluscs by dredging near Bangor and discovered Patella tessellata which was then thought to be a new species and named as Patella clealandi by James Sowerby in 1822. He received specimens from others including Alexander McEwen. He wrote a list of the shells of counties Down and Antrim with 160 species. He also corresponded with William Elford Leach. He died at Rathgael House.
