= Basket Range, South Australia =

Basket Range South Australia
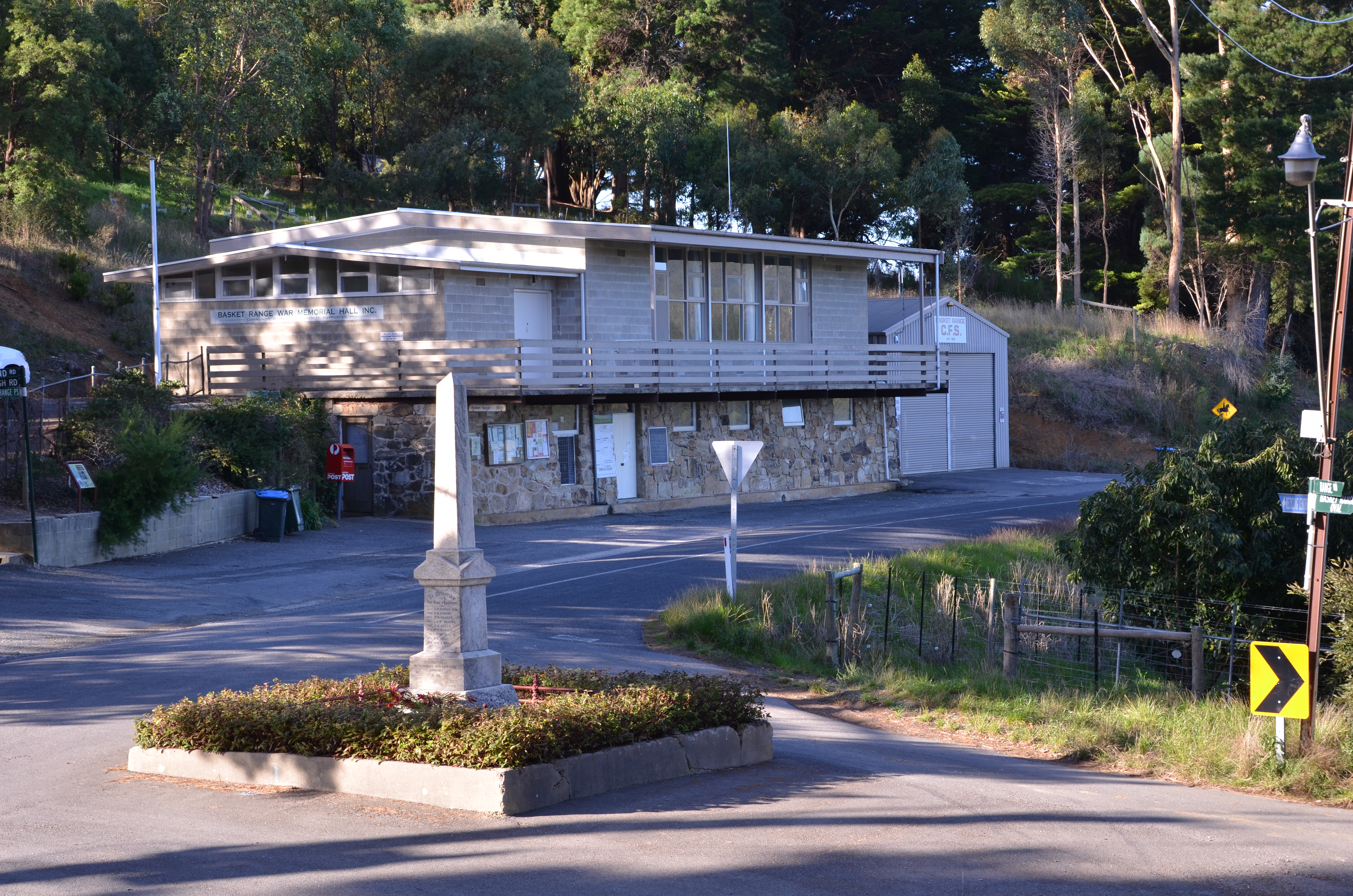
- The World War I monument in the foreground, with the Basket Range Memorial Hall and CFS station in the background.

- Coordinates: 34°56′S 138°46′E
- Population: 364 (SAL 2021)
- Established: 1853
- Postcode(s): 5138
- Elevation: 462 m (1,516 ft)
- Location: 15 km (9 mi) from Adelaide
- LGA(s): Adelaide Hills Council
- State electorate(s): Morialta
- Federal division(s): Mayo

Basket Range is a small town in the Adelaide Hills, South Australia. It is located on an approximately north–south ridge that runs from Deep Creek in the north to Greenhill Road in the south. The area is completely encircled by hills, giving the town the appearance of nestling within a large basket, hence "Basket Range".

It has been suggested that the name may derive from the practice of German farmers who, travelling from Lobethal to Adelaide along the old Bullock Track which passed through the area, would carry their produce in large wicker baskets. It has also been suggested that a Mr Basket was in charge of issuing timber-cutting licences in the very early days; however, there is no evidence of any Mr Basket having lived there or been in charge of licences.

The town's main industries include apple and cherry orchards, and there are numerous cottages available for bed and breakfast accommodation. Basket Range Primary School was established in 1885, and the Basket Range CFS was founded in 1969.

Basket Range Post Office opened on 1 April 1892.

Basket Range is also home to one of the oldest cricket clubs in the region. Basket Range Cricket Club was formed in 1892 and their oval overlooks the wide sweeping hills views of the area.
