= Scott Cleland =

American researcher, analyst, policy advocate

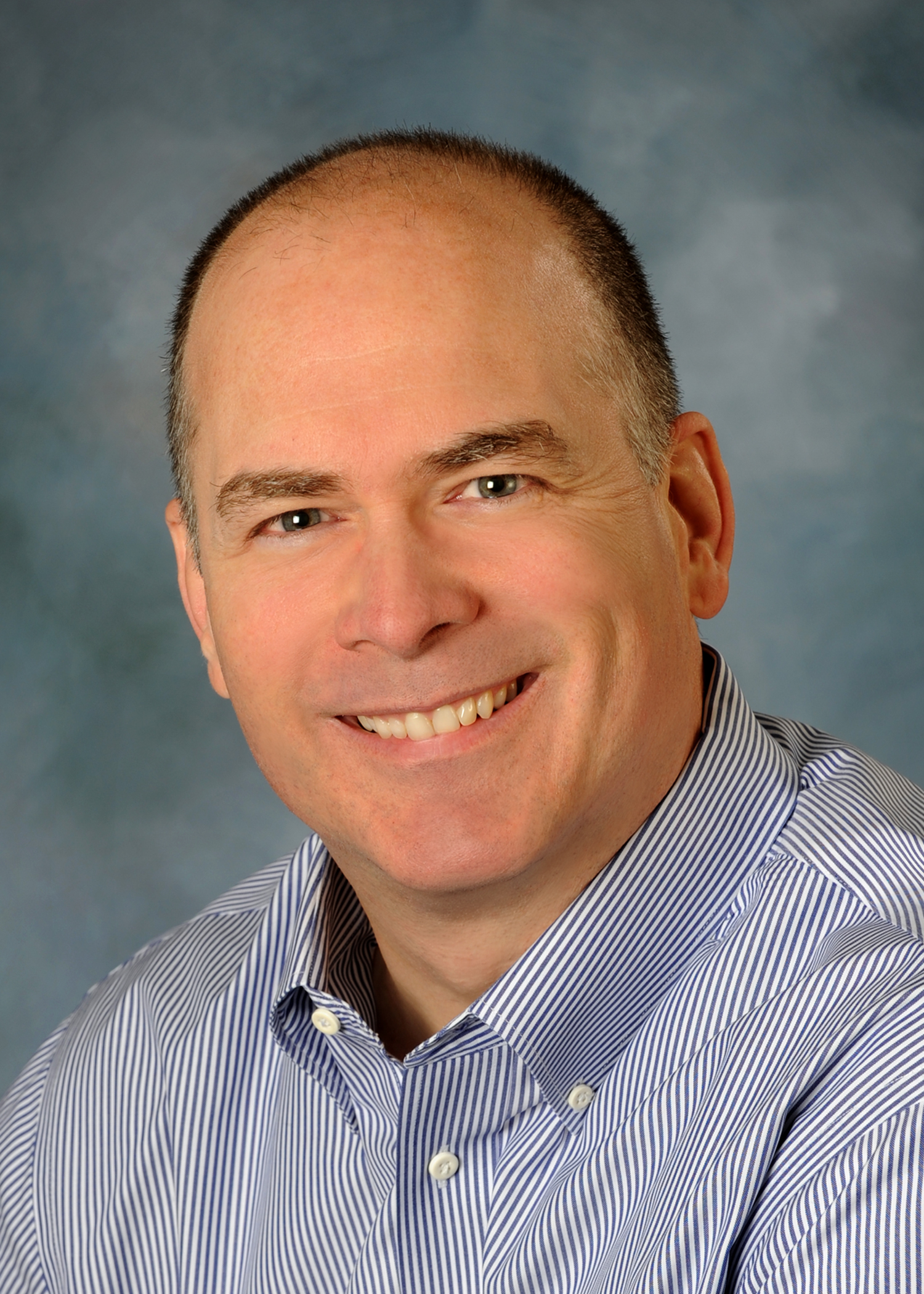
- Born: Scott Cameron Cleland
- Citizenship: United States
- Education: Kalamazoo College (BA)
- Notable work: a deputy assistant secretary of state. an Internet advisor to the U.S. State Department Advisory Committee for International Communications and Information Policy
- Website: scottcleland.com

Scott Cleland is an American researcher, analyst, policy advocate, and entrepreneur known for his work in investment analysis, communications policy, Internet competition/antitrust analysis, and accountability advocacy.

Cleland founded several organizations including the Precursor Group, a broker-dealer which provides investment change research for institutional investors, and Precursor, which provides competition, antitrust, accountability, policy research, and macro Internet/AI advisory, NetCompetition.org, The Investorside Research Association, ProvenPrecursor and Restore US Institute.

== Education ==
Cleland graduated with a Bachelor of Arts in political science and an Honors Senior Thesis from Kalamazoo College in 1982. In 2000, Kalamazoo College awarded Cleland the Distinguished Achievement Award for his professional contributions.

== Career ==
Cleland was also appointed as a deputy assistant secretary of state with the title of deputy United States coordinator for communications and information policy. Later, he was appointed an Internet advisor to the U.S. State Department Advisory Committee for International Communications and Information Policy in the W. Bush Administrations.

=== Investment research analyst and entrepreneur ===
After leaving government service, Cleland became a telecommunications investment analyst for the Schwab Washington Research Group, which was awarded the 1996 Institutional Investor All America Research team for Washington Research. From 1993 to 1997, Cleland was Legg Mason's Director of the Precursor Group.

In 2000, on the advice of a former FCC chairman, Cleland founded The Precursor Group a broker-dealer, based on pioneering a novel Change Research methodology for investing. Institutional Investor Magazine ranked The Precursor Group as the #1 Independent Investment Research provider in Telecom and #3 in Technology in 2004 and 2005.

Cleland is known for being the first in change research and the only investment research firm that accurately predicted WorldCom's demise and bankruptcy when WorldCom was the most recommended stock in the marketplace. Cleland was also early in discovering and warning investors that the DotCom and Fiber bubbles would crash because they were based on inaccurate internet traffic growth.

=== Investor protection advocacy ===
In 2002, Cleland conceived of and was the founding chairman of Investorside, the first association of independent research firms serving investors and the first US financial services association to require a code of ethics for certification and membership. As Chairman of Investorside, Cleland was the first analyst to testify to Congress on how conflicts of interest caused Enron's, WorldCom's, and other record bankruptcies. Congress looked to Investorside's testimony to explain how banking conflicts of interest harmed investors before the record WorldCom bankruptcy triggered the passage of the seminal Sarbanes-Oxley Act of 2002, which protects investors from audit and accounting fraud and financial conflicts of interest. Cleland also contributed to investor protection as the lead source to the PBS Frontline Emmy-winning documentary “The Wall Street Fix” for his insights into the industry's conflicts of interest.

=== Net neutrality and competition/antitrust advocacy ===
In 2006, Cleland founded NetCompetition.org, a pro-competition e-forum funded by telecom, wireless and cable companies including Verizon. In 2007, Cleland, in Senate congressional testimony, warned Congress and antitrust officials that the Google DoubleClick merger would create a monopoly. In 2010, Cleland, in House congressional testimony, warned Congress and antitrust officials again that other BigTech Internet platforms would become monopolies as well. In 2011, Cleland authored Search & Destroy: Why You Can't Trust Google Inc., which was translated into Portuguese and Korean. The book was selected as one of the top 20 most important cyber-law and information policy books of the year by Adam Thierer of the Technology Liberation Front. Cleland founded and led the Restore Us Institute, a non-profit internet accountability research and education think tank.

=== Policy advocacy and antitrust work ===
Cleland's work extends into communications and technology policy. He was an advocate for independent investment research and co-founded the Investorside Research Association, promoting ethical practices in the field. He also contributed to the Emmy-winning documentary The Wall Street Fix for his insights into financial industry conflicts of interest.

Cleland's advocacy includes promoting accountability in internet policy, particularly through his analysis of Section 230 of the Communications Decency Act.

== Publications ==
- Cleland, Scott; Brodsky, Ira (2011). Search & Destroy. St. Louis, Mo: Telescope Books. ISBN 978-0-9800383-2-3. OCLC 727363979.
