= Margaret Cleland =

Margaret Shaw Jackson GM (née Cleland; died 2011) was a Scottish police officer, awarded the George Medal for saving a father in London in March 1964 from committing suicide with his infant son.

Cleland was born in Twechar, Dunbartonshire, and became a policewoman (WPC) with London's Metropolitan Police Service. In March 1964, when she was 26 years old and only three years into the job, she was called on to try to coax a suicidal Scotsman, Thomas French, from jumping off the roof of a building in Bloomsbury, central London. French, originally from Glasgow, owned a garage in Cambridge, but suffered frequent bouts of depression. He had scaled the 43-foot building and held his 22-month old son Stuart whom he threatened to take with him when he jumped. He refused to speak to any of the policemen attending the scene, so Cleland was called upon in the hope that her female sensitivity and Scots voice would be familiar and calming to French. Firemen held a large circular net on the street-corner below, a large crowd gathered, and the BBC broadcast the drama live on television as Cleland sat on the parapet of the building to try to calm French. She slowly inched her way forward towards him, then after over an hour of conversation suddenly lunged forward to grab the baby. French, who did not immediately let go of his son, was pulled forward with the child, and fell onto the sloping roof. Policemen who had been waiting behind Cleland then leaped on French, who did not struggle, and after the baby had been secured, French was led off downstairs to safety. Thomas French returned to Cambridge, and died of cancer in 2007, aged 74. Stuart French only learned of the dramatic incident when he was in his teens, but had not seen the TV footage until 2015, fifty years after the incident, when it was used in a television documentary he watched.

== Awards ==
Cleland was awarded the George Medal for her bravery, one of only two Scots policewomen so honoured. She married a fellow policeman, Thomas Jackson, and transferred back to Dunbartonshire. She retired from the police and became a civilian telex operator with the Scottish Criminal Records Office in Glasgow. For the last 18 years of her life she lived in Milton of Campsie. She died from cancer in 2011.

Part of the TV footage of the rescue can be seen online.

The George Medal award citation was published in the Third Supplement (dated 18 August 1964) to the London Gazette of Friday 14 August 1964.
