= Murray Nicoll =

Australian journalist and broadcaster

- Born: 20 July 1943
- Died: 2 May 2010 (aged 66)
- Occupation: Journalist
- Known for: Narrating destruction of his own house during the Ash Wednesday bushfires
- Spouse: Frankie
- Children: 2
- Awards: 2 Walkley Awards

Murray Nicoll (20 July 1943 – 2 May 2010) was an Australian journalist and broadcaster whose career spanned more than 45 years. He was best known for providing reports on 5DN radio from his own burning home during the Ash Wednesday fires of 1983. His reports on the fire and the destruction of his house earned Nicoll the 1983 Walkley Award for best radio news report.

Nicoll's resume in journalism included stints at The News, in Melbourne radio, including the top rating drive time program on 3AW, and ABC radio in Adelaide, Australia. He worked as a television reporter for Channel 7 during the last five years of his life. He earned the 1985 Walkley Award for best radio current affairs report for his radio broadcasts from an expedition to Mount Everest.

Nicoll died of leukaemia at his home on 2 May 2010, at the age of 66.

He was the uncle of Chris Nicoll, currently head of production for the Capital FM Network in the UK.
