= Ruth Cleland =

New Zealand artist (born 1976)

Ruth Cleland (born 1976) is a New Zealand artist, based in Auckland. Her works are held in the collection of Auckland Art Gallery Toi o Tāmaki. Cleland is known for her photo-realist paintings and pencil drawings of suburban landscapes, and her abstract grid works. Cleland lives in Auckland with her husband and fellow photo-realistic artist Gary McMillan.

== Biography ==
Cleland was born in Hamilton in 1976 and raised in Gordonton. In 1998 she gained a Bachelor of Fine Arts degree at the Dunedin School of Art, Otago Polytechnic, and completed her Master of Fine Arts in 2002. It was at the Dunedin School of Art where she met Gary McMillan, also from the Waikato. Since then Cleland has exhibited nationally and internationally in private galleries as well as public art institutions.

Trained as a printmaker, Cleland specialised in burnished aquatint, an intaglio process similar to mezzotint. As Cleland advanced in this printing process, she found her prints could be improved by adding detail by hand, and in 2001 she went further by combining prints and drawings on the one sheet. Her subjects were familiar but overlooked objects and areas, such as corners of rooms, light fittings and ceiling cornices. In 2004 she turned her attention to exterior views of the suburbs around Hamilton where her parents live. Cleland presented a series of these suburbia works in 2006 at Blue Oyster Gallery in Dunedin. After moving to Auckland in 2006, Cleland began focusing on shopping malls.

Throughout Cleland's career the grid has remained a central motif. The grid is used as a device to map out her photo-realist drawings and paintings, the underlying grid at times remaining visible in the completed works. From 2009 the grid began to feature more prominently in Cleland's work as a mode of abstraction, and in 2014 a series of these grid paintings featured as a multi-panel installation at Window Gallery in Auckland. It was also in 2014 when Cleland started to combine her two modes of working, placing the grid paintings alongside the photo-realist paintings to form diptychs.

Cleland lists Latvian-born American artist Vija Celmins among her influences, famous for her accurately rendered images of nature.

== Notable exhibitions ==
- Fluorescent (2018) at Melanie Roger Gallery, Auckland.
- Concrete Abstraction (2016) at Melanie Roger Gallery, Auckland.
- Grid (2014) at Window Gallery, University of Auckland.
- Inland Empire (2013), Calder & Lawson Gallery, University of Waikato, and Corban Estate Art Centre, Auckland. A duo exhibition with husband and fellow artist, Gary McMillan.
- Mall (2010) at Gus Fisher Gallery, Auckland and Enjoy Contemporary Art Space, Wellington. Cleland presented a series of photo-realistic drawings documenting suburban shopping malls in New Zealand.
- Sunny Days (2006) at Blue Oyster Gallery, Dunedin.
- Saunter (2002) at Hocken Library, Dunedin.

== Awards ==
- 2014 Highly commended finalist in the Wellington-based Parkin Drawing Prize for 2014, for her work Parking Building Detail with Grid.
- 2008 Park Lane Wallace Trust Development Award for her work Level 2. Cleland won a three month-long residency at the Vermont Studio Centre.
- 2004 Merit Award, National Drawing Award, Artspace, Auckland, and Physics Room, Christchurch
- 2003 First Prize, Waikato National Art Award, Hamilton
- 2001 First Prize, Cranleigh Barton National Drawing Award, Canterbury Museum, Christchurch
- Graeme Edwards Master of Fine Arts Scholarship, Dunedin School of Art
