= Mount Lofty =

Mountain in South Australia

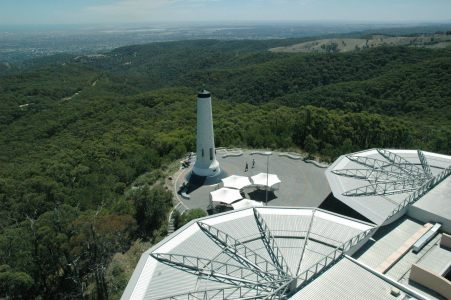
- North view of the Summit and Flinders Column from the Fire Tower

Highest point
- Elevation: 710 m (2,330 ft)
- Coordinates: 34°58′S 138°42′E

Geography
- Location within South Australia
- Location: Cleland, South Australia, Australia
- Parent range: Mount Lofty Ranges

Climbing
- First ascent: April 1831; Collet Barker (but likely ascended by Indigenous peoples before European contact)

Mount Lofty (34°58′S 138°42′E, elevation 710 m (2,330 ft) AHD) is the highest point in the southern Mount Lofty Ranges. It is located about 15 km (9.3 mi) east of the Adelaide city centre, within the Cleland National Park in the Adelaide Hills area of South Australia.

The mountain's summit has panoramic views of the city and the Adelaide plains to the west, and of the Picadilly Valley to the east. It is also popular destination for international tourists, as well as for cyclists coming up the old Mount Barker Road through Eagle on the Hill, and for walkers from Waterfall Gully. During winter, hail and sleet regularly occur on the mountain, and occasionally small dustings of light snow.

== History ==
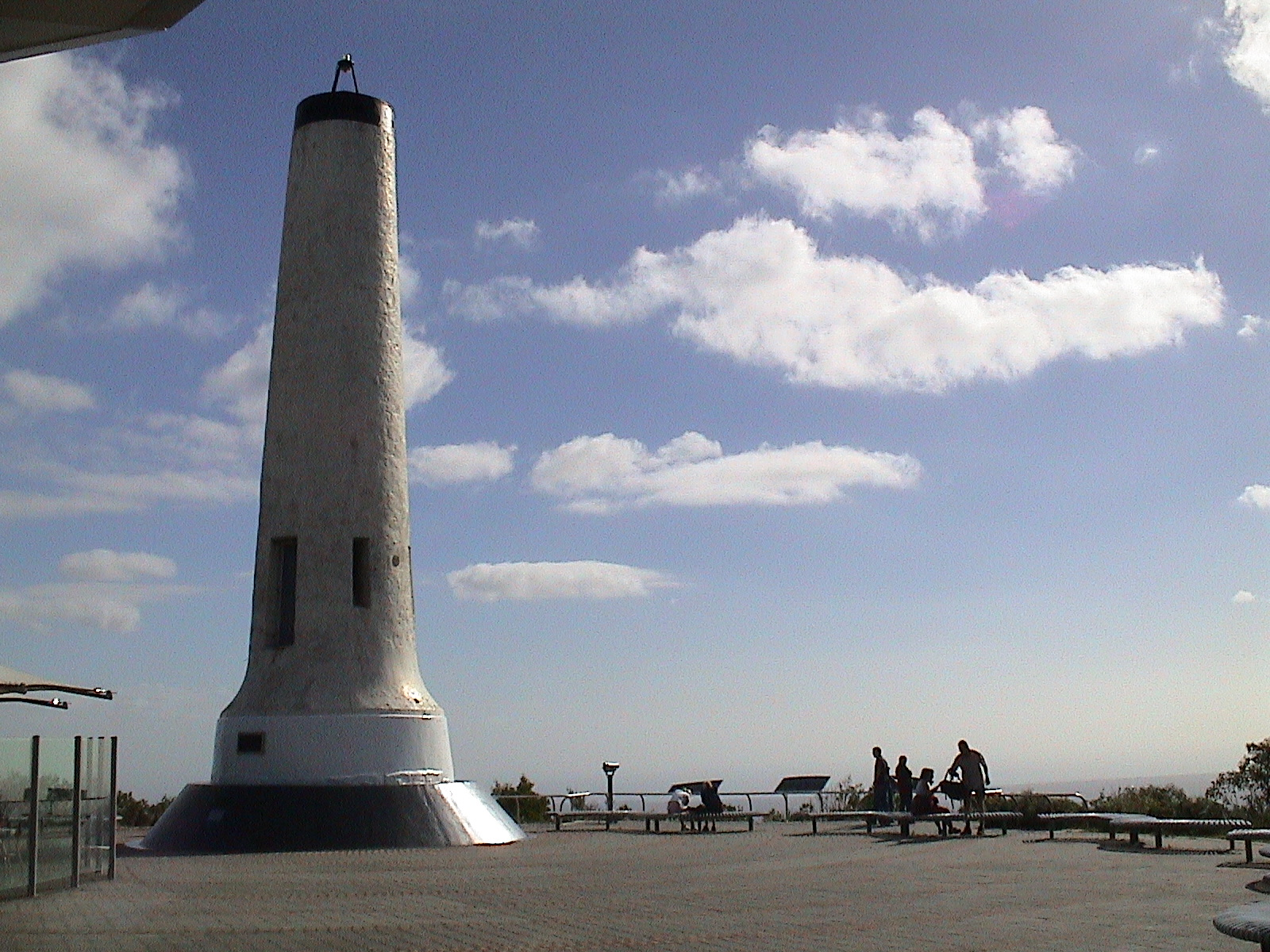
Flinders Column and viewing platform

=== Aboriginal significance ===
The adjacent peaks of Mount Lofty and Mount Bonython form a prominent landmark visible across the Adelaide Plains, known to the local Kaurna people as Yuridla, 'two-ears', part of the body of an ancestral being called Nganu. This Kaurna name has been preserved in its anglicised form as the name of the nearby town of Uraidla.

=== European discovery and use ===
Mount Lofty was named by Matthew Flinders on 23 March 1802 during his circumnavigation of the Australian continent. The explorer Collet Barker was the first European to climb it, in April 1831, almost six years before Adelaide was settled.

A stone cairn at the summit was originally used to mark the trig point, and in 1885 this was replaced by an obelisk which served as the central reference point for surveying purposes across Adelaide. In 1902 the obelisk was rededicated and renamed as the "Flinders Column".

The summit was closed to the public during the Second World War, when the obelisk was considered an indispensable navigation aid. A flashing strobe was fitted to the top to improve visibility at night. This strobe was removed after the war, but then re-installed in the 1990s, when the obelisk was repainted and restored during construction of a new kiosk.

== Access and description ==
The summit can be accessed by road from the South Eastern Freeway at Crafers, and from the eastern suburbs via Greenhill Road and the Mount Lofty Scenic Route. There is a walking route up the gully from Waterfall Gully, through the Cleland National Park and from Chambers Gully. This is a 4 km uphill trek and one of Adelaide's most popular exercise circuits.

The summit provides panoramic views across Adelaide, a cafe-restaurant and a gift shop. Kangaroos are sometimes spotted on the trails leading up to the summit.

On the ridge near the summit are three television transmission towers (the northernmost being that of the ABC), and the Mount Lofty Fire Tower operated by the Country Fire Service.

== Historic houses ==
Summit Road, Mt Lofty, was historically one of the best-known addresses in South Australia, with the summer houses of several prominent families being located there. These were all destroyed or severely damaged by the Ash Wednesday bushfires in 1983, but have subsequently been restored. They include:

- Mt Lofty House (1858) - Arthur Hardy
- Eurilla (1884) - William Milne, 1917; Lavington Bonython, 1972; Kym Bonython, 1998
- Carminow (1885) - Thomas Elder, 1905 Langdon Bonython

Other buildings, such as St Michael's House (an Anglican theological college and priory) and "Arthur's Seat", for a time known as Stawell School, a private school for girls, were never rebuilt. Part of this property was excised for the ABC-TV transmitter building and mast.

Note that historically, "Mount Lofty" addresses frequently referred to the area now known as Crafers and to parts of Stirling.

== Climate ==
=== Snow ===
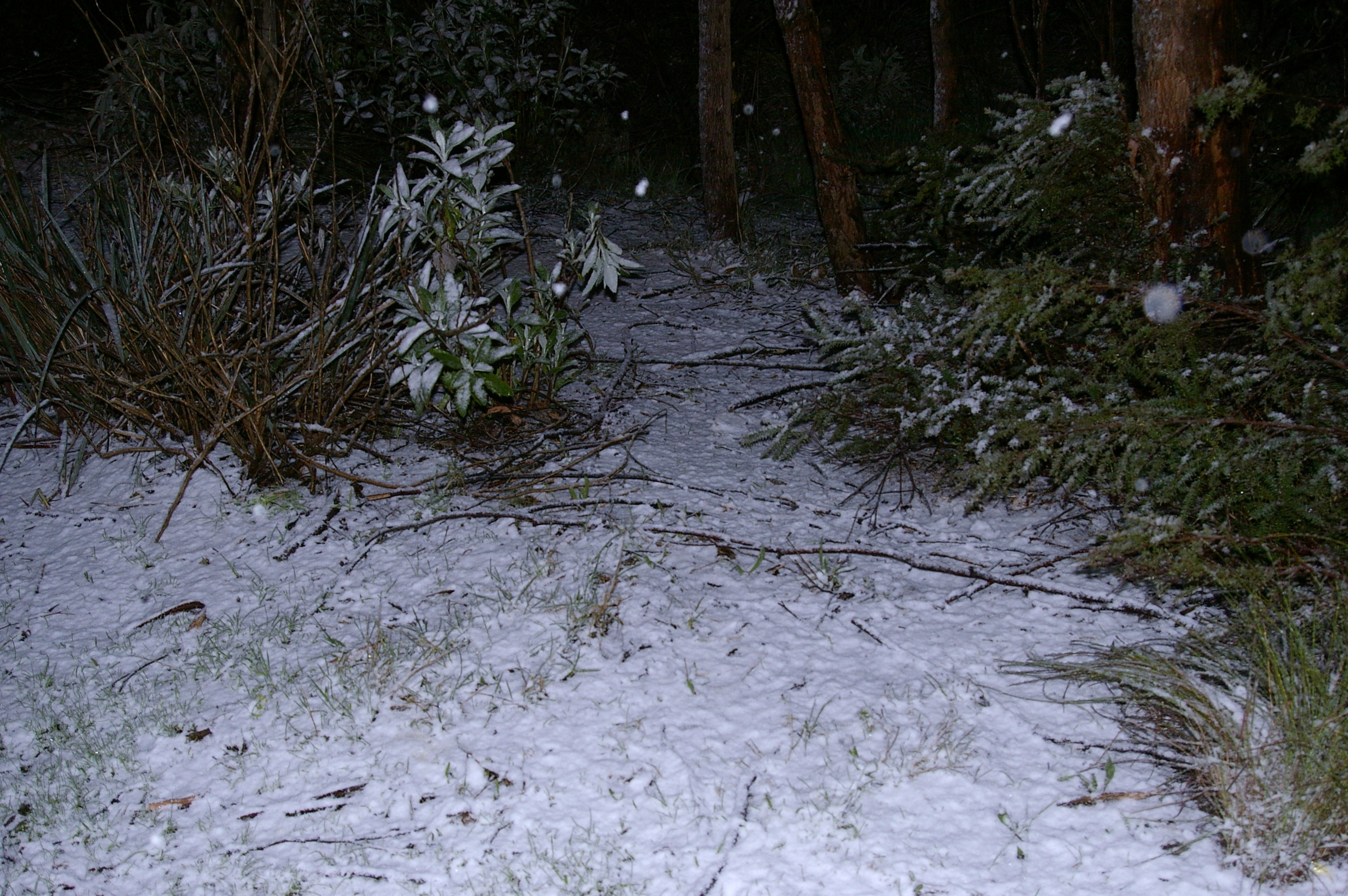
Snow on Mount Lofty in August 2008.

Mount Lofty is the coldest location in the Adelaide area; during winter months the temperature may not exceed 3-4 °C on some days.

Adelaide's metropolitan area experiences mild winters, with temperatures virtually never cold enough to produce snow; the nearest snowfields to Adelaide are in central Victoria, over 700 km away. However, Mount Lofty's summit is the most common location for snow in South Australia; rare snowfalls sometimes occur in other parts of the Mount Lofty Ranges, and occasionally further north, in the Flinders and Gammon Ranges. Snowfall tends to be light (rarely lasting for more than a day) and does not take place every year. Sleet however is a regular occurrence.

=== General and rainfall ===
Mount Lofty has a cool Mediterranean climate (Csb) in the Köppen climate classification, due to its elevation and very dry summers with a pronounced winter rainfall peak. The annual rainfall is nearly twice the amount, and the monthly rainfall during winter more than twice the amount, of the city of Adelaide. Cloud cover is particularly heavy during the winter months.

Climate data for Mount Lofty (1991−2020); 685 m AMSL; 34.98° S, 138.71° E
| Month | Jan | Feb | Mar | Apr | May | Jun | Jul | Aug | Sep | Oct | Nov | Dec | Year |
|---|---|---|---|---|---|---|---|---|---|---|---|---|---|
| Record high °C (°F) | 41.1 (106.0) | 38.9 (102.0) | 36.0 (96.8) | 31.0 (87.8) | 24.5 (76.1) | 20.1 (68.2) | 16.9 (62.4) | 24.0 (75.2) | 27.0 (80.6) | 34.3 (93.7) | 37.1 (98.8) | 39.0 (102.2) | 41.1 (106.0) |
| Mean daily maximum °C (°F) | 22.5 (72.5) | 22.5 (72.5) | 19.6 (67.3) | 16.2 (61.2) | 12.3 (54.1) | 9.4 (48.9) | 8.9 (48.0) | 10.0 (50.0) | 12.4 (54.3) | 15.3 (59.5) | 18.0 (64.4) | 20.2 (68.4) | 15.6 (60.1) |
| Daily mean °C (°F) | 17.5 (63.5) | 17.7 (63.9) | 15.4 (59.7) | 13.1 (55.6) | 10.0 (50.0) | 7.5 (45.5) | 7.0 (44.6) | 7.6 (45.7) | 9.3 (48.7) | 11.4 (52.5) | 13.7 (56.7) | 15.5 (59.9) | 12.1 (53.9) |
| Mean daily minimum °C (°F) | 12.4 (54.3) | 12.9 (55.2) | 11.2 (52.2) | 9.9 (49.8) | 7.7 (45.9) | 5.6 (42.1) | 5.0 (41.0) | 5.2 (41.4) | 6.1 (43.0) | 7.5 (45.5) | 9.3 (48.7) | 10.8 (51.4) | 8.6 (47.5) |
| Record low °C (°F) | 4.5 (40.1) | 4.4 (39.9) | 3.8 (38.8) | 2.5 (36.5) | −0.4 (31.3) | 0.0 (32.0) | −0.1 (31.8) | −0.5 (31.1) | 0.3 (32.5) | 0.4 (32.7) | 1.4 (34.5) | 3.0 (37.4) | −0.5 (31.1) |
| Average precipitation mm (inches) | 38.5 (1.52) | 36.5 (1.44) | 38.2 (1.50) | 58.0 (2.28) | 109.9 (4.33) | 143.5 (5.65) | 147.9 (5.82) | 139.0 (5.47) | 114.1 (4.49) | 65.6 (2.58) | 43.0 (1.69) | 44.8 (1.76) | 986.4 (38.83) |
| Average rainy days | 6.9 | 8.1 | 10.0 | 12.9 | 17.3 | 20.2 | 22.1 | 21.5 | 18.1 | 13.8 | 11.0 | 10.0 | 171.9 |
| Average relative humidity (%) (at 3pm) | 51 | 50 | 56 | 60 | 73 | 82 | 80 | 72 | 70 | 64 | 58 | 53 | 64 |

== Notable people ==
- Edward Charles Stirling (1848–1919), anthropologist, died at Mount Lofty

== Gallery ==
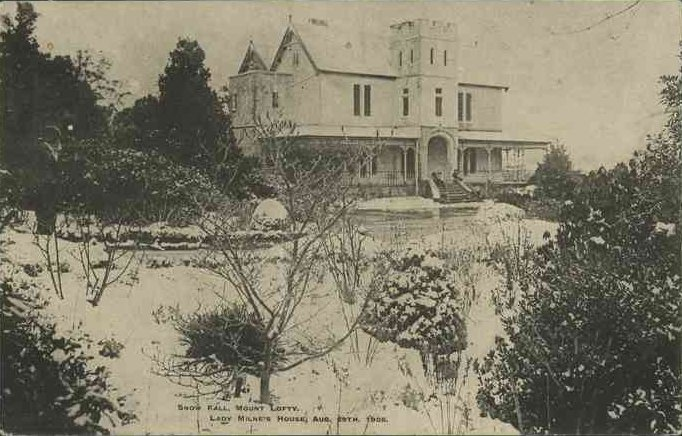
Snow at Eurilla in 1905

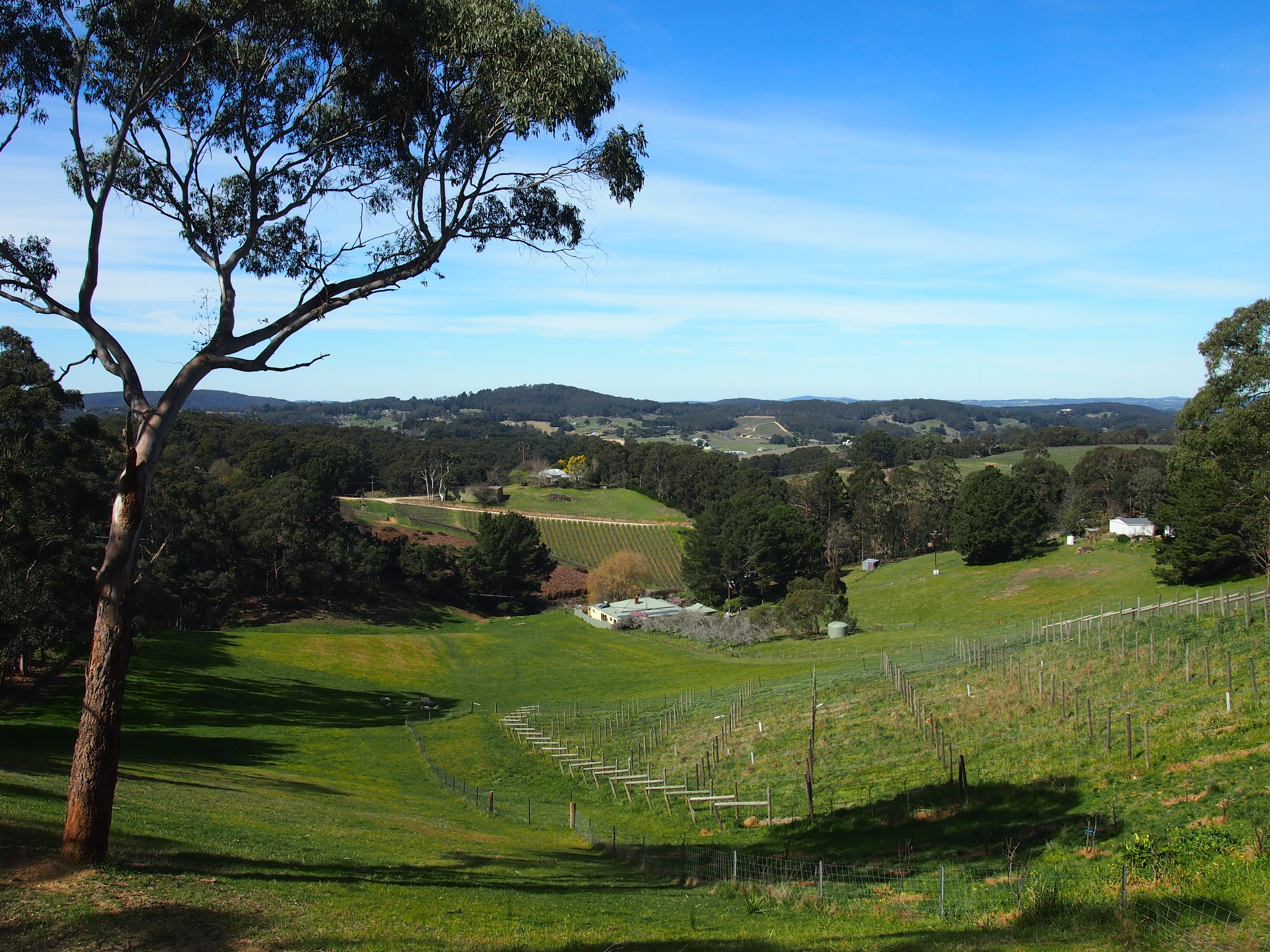
View SE across the Piccadilly Valley from the Mount Lofty Scenic Route. The summit of Mount Barker, 22 km away, is visible on the horizon.

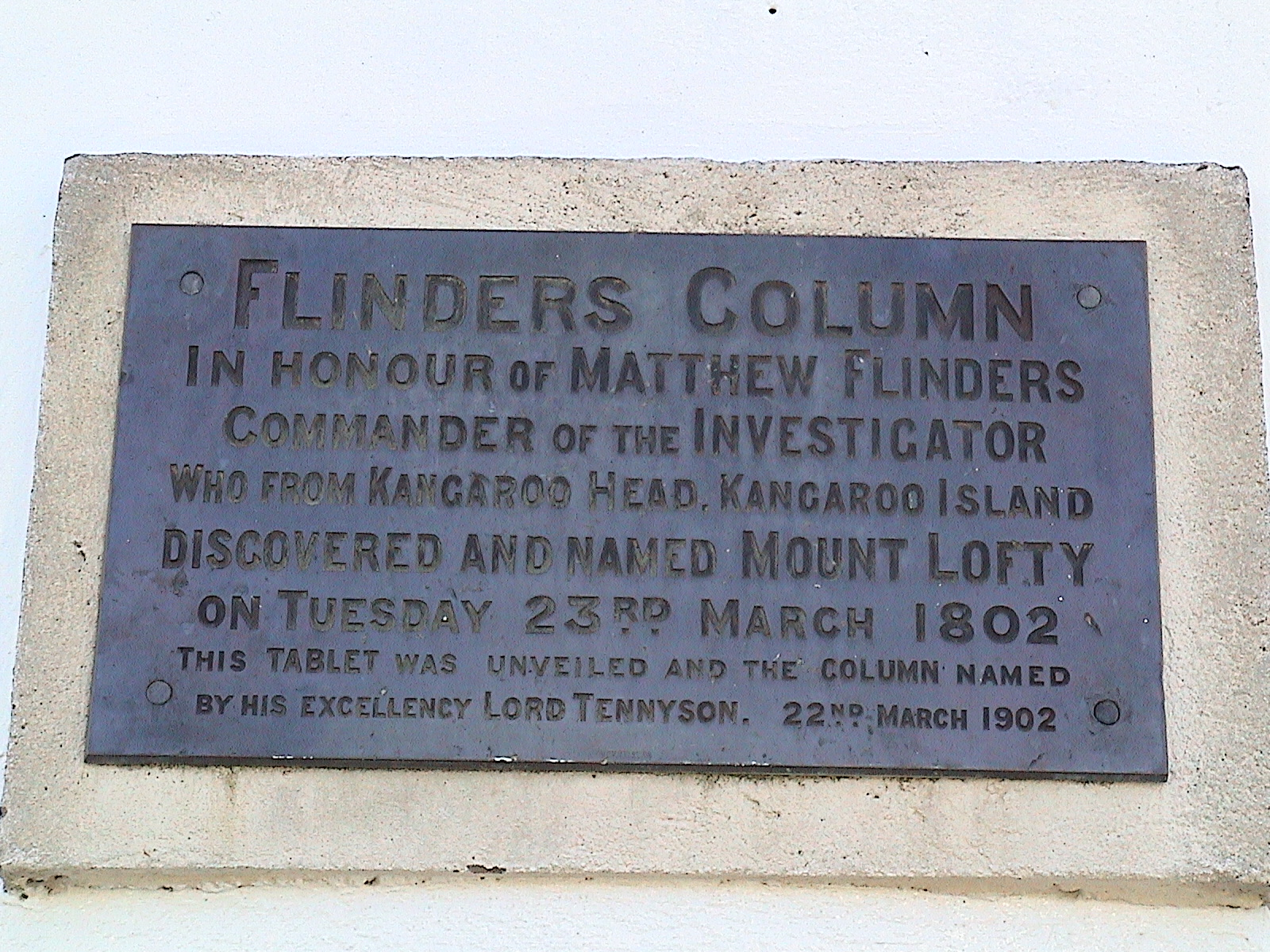
Flinders Column dedication plaque, from 1902

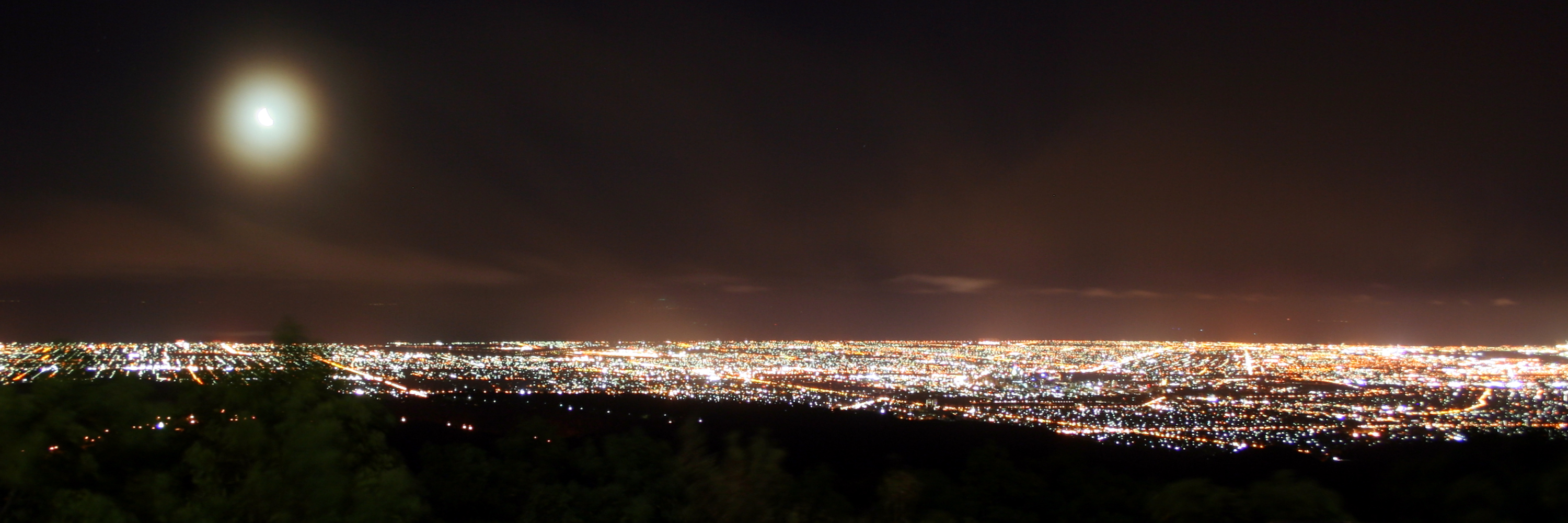
View of Adelaide Plains at night from the summit.

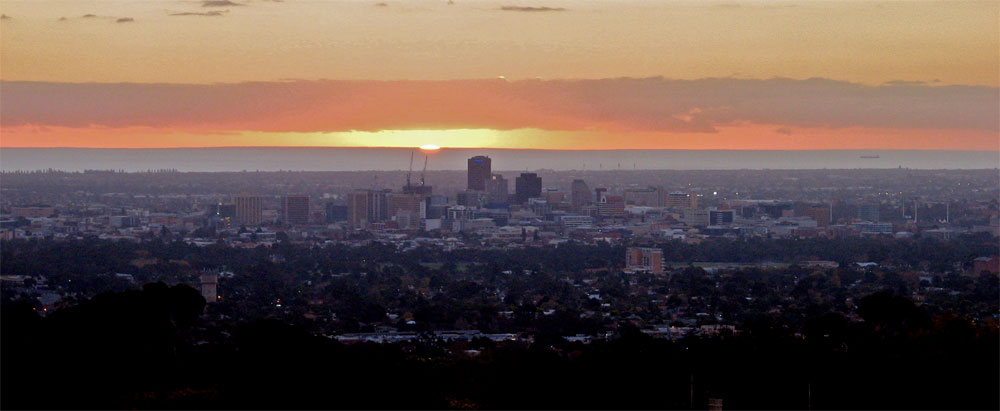
View of the eastern suburbs, the Adelaide city centre and the Gulf St Vincent at sunset from the summit.

== See also ==
- List of mountains in Australia
