= Cleland National Park =

Protected area in Cleland, South Australia

- IUCN category II (national park)
- Map of Cleland National Park

- Location within South Australia
- Location: South Australia
- Nearest city: Adelaide city centre
- Coordinates: 34°58′03″S 138°41′45″E
- Area: 11.25 km^{2} (4.34 sq mi)
- Established: 1 January 1945
- Website: https://www.parks.sa.gov.au/parks/cleland-national-park

Cleland National Park is a protected area in the Adelaide Hills of South Australia, located about 22 kilometres (14 mi) south-east of Adelaide's city centre. It preserves a substantial expanse of natural bushland along the Adelaide Hills face, encompassing Mount Lofty Summit and Waterfall Gully. Classified as an IUCN Category II protected area, the park was formerly Cleland Conservation Park. In November 2021, it was merged with the adjoining Eurilla Conservation Park and upgraded to national park status.

Cleland National Park, like all reserves and parks in South Australia, is managed under the National Parks and Wildlife Act 1972 and the Wilderness Protection Act 1992, with conservation responsibilities overseen by the Minister under the Crown Land Management Act 2009.

== Geography ==
Cleland National Park is located in the Adelaide Hills, South Australia, about 22 kilometres south-east of Adelaide city centre. It covers 1,036 hectares (2,560 acres), making it one of the largest areas of native vegetation along the Mount Lofty Ranges hills face. The park includes walking and cycling trails that provide access to wildlife habitats, cultural heritage sites, and views of the Adelaide Hills and surrounding areas.

The park's terrain features creeks, steep-sided gullies, eucalypt stringybark forests, and woodlands, which support a variety of habitats. It contains some of the last intact swamps and bogs in the region, providing habitat for endangered and endemic species such as the southern brown bandicoot and king fern. Waterfall Gully and Mount Lofty Summit are located within the park and are linked by a popular walking trail. Most of the park consists of bushland, with woodlands dominating and some open areas where clearing has occurred.

== History ==
On 27 March 1802, Matthew Flinders, sailing off the south coast of South Australia, sighted Mount Lofty. In 1831, Collet Barker and his associates, Kent and Davis, made the first recorded European ascent of the mountain, during which they observed a tree with a girth of nearly 15 metres (49 ft), highlighting the area's potential for logging. Road construction began in 1839 with the development of Waterfall Gully Road, followed by Greenhill Road in 1858, improving access. In 1856, Arthur Hardy used the land for sheep grazing and built Mount Lofty House, and he was regarded as one of Adelaide's wealthiest residents at the time. In the latter half of the 19th century, Samuel Davenport owned much of what is now Cleland National Park, establishing orchards and gardens in the gullies and experimenting with crops such as tobacco, mulberry trees for silk production, and grapes.

After 1903, several opportunities to purchase land near Waterfall Gully were missed due to concerns over suitability and high prices, including an offer of 970 hectares by Davenport, which the government declined. By the 1930s, the area had been extensively modified: vegetation was cleared for agriculture and housing, logging had removed much of the timber, and grazing by livestock damaged understorey vegetation and spread weeds. These activities led to soil erosion, flooding, and landscape scarring from timber tracks and a quarry.

Despite pressure from the Tourist Bureau and various conservation groups, the land that now comprises Cleland Conservation Park was not purchased by the government until 1945. Established on 1 January 1945, the park was classified as an IUCN Category II protected area, combining ecosystem protection with recreational use. It was named after John Burton Cleland, a naturalist and member of the Royal Society of South Australia. Following Cleland's conservation efforts, the area was declared the Cleland Wildlife Reserve in 1963. Cleland Conservation Park was proclaimed in 1978.

On 26 November 2021, Cleland Conservation Park was merged with the adjacent Eurilla Conservation Park and designated as Cleland National Park. This new park includes the Cleland Wildlife Park precinct, which will remain part of the national park but requires separate management due to its high visitor numbers and commercial nature.

== Flora and fauna ==
Cleland National Park contains diverse habitats including bogs, heathlands, forests, gullies, woodlands, grasslands, creeks, and waterfalls, supporting numerous rare, endangered, and endemic species. The bogs, among the few remaining in the Mount Lofty Ranges, host rare and threatened plants such as the king fern, coral fern, and naked sun orchid, and provide habitat for the endangered southern brown bandicoot. Heathlands on the ridgetops support the endangered Mount Lofty Ranges chestnut-rumped heathwren, along with bandicoots and other bushland birds. Forested gullies provide habitat for the vulnerable bassian thrush, while the park also supports species such as the yellow-footed antechinus and Cunningham's skink.

Woodlands and grasslands dominated by blue gum, manna gum, stringybark, and kangaroo grass provide habitat for over 90 bird species, including the vulnerable yellow-tailed black cockatoo. Permanent creeks and waterfalls support aquatic species such as the vulnerable mountain galaxias and Brown Toadlet. While vegetation has regenerated since past timber and farming use, threats include weeds, altered fire regimes, grazing pressure, and pest animals such as rabbits, foxes, feral cats, and deer. Some weed-infested areas provide important habitat for native fauna, but weed control is prioritised to protect high-value native vegetation and threatened flora sites.

== Places of interest ==
Cleland Wildlife Park is part of the shared boundary of the Kaurna and Peramangk people, historically used as a meeting and trading place, with both nations holding dreaming stories connected to the Mount Lofty Ranges. The park includes Cleland Wildlife Park, a tourist attraction since 1967, as well as Waterfall Gully and Mount Lofty Summit.

=== Cleland Wildlife Park ===
Cleland Wildlife Park has been managed separately from the national park and has operated as a major tourist destination since 1967. The park allows visitors to get close to native animals in their natural environment. Visitors can participate in experiences such as being photographed holding a koala, interacting with reptiles daily, observing keepers at feeding times, meeting short-beaked echidnas, and joining guided day and night walks. Some animals in the enclosures can be patted, including red and western grey kangaroos and swamp wallabies. Other species present include Tasmanian devils, southern hairy-nosed wombats, western pygmy possums, bilbies, yellow-footed rock wallabies, dingoes, various native birds such as Emus, Cockatoos, and Australian pelicans, and reptiles such as Snakes and goannas.

As of 2021, Cleland Wildlife Park attracted approximately 100,000 tourists annually. It is a member of the South Australian Tourism Hall of Fame. The park won the "Significant Tourism Attraction" category at the South Australian Tourism Awards in 2007, 2008, and 2009.

=== Mount Lofty summit ===
Mount Lofty summit is 727 metres (2,385 ft) above sea level. It provides sweeping vistas across the Adelaide Plains and Gulf St Vincent. Flinders Column, a white painted obelisk shaped like a lighthouse, is a landmark which can be seen from far away on a clear day. Car parking facilities are provided: charges are payable. Public bus route 823 serves the summit with three journeys a day (including weekends and most holidays). Other facilities include an information centre/ souvenir shop, a café/restaurant (closed Mondays) and public toilets.

=== Waterfall Gully ===
Waterfall Gully, another popular part of the park, is located on its western edge. It can be accessed via the sealed Waterfall Gully Road. The main attraction is a waterfall, the largest of several in the park. The base is a short walk from the car park and the top can be reached by a formed but steep footpath, which continues to Cleland Wildlife Park and Mount Lofty summit.
