= List of Australian rules football clubs in South Australia =

This is a list of clubs that play Australian rules football in South Australia at the senior level. Guide to abbreviations:

- FC = Football Club
- AFC = Australian Football Club (mainly used if in Queensland or NSW or outside Australia) / Amateur Football Club (mainly used in the other Australian States)
- ARFC = Australian Rules Football Club

== National Level ==
=== Australian Football League ===
| Club | Colours | Nickname | Home Ground | Former league | Est. | Years in AFL | AFL premierships | |
| Club | Colours | Nickname | Home Ground | Former league | Est. | Years in AFL | Total | Most recent |
|---|---|---|---|---|---|---|---|---|
| Adelaide | | Crows | Adelaide Oval, City Centre | — | 1990 | 1991- | 2 | 1998 |
| Port Adelaide | | Power | Adelaide Oval, City Centre | SANFL | 1870 | 1997- | 1 | 2004 |

== State Level ==
=== South Australian National Football League ===
| Club | Colours | Nickname | Home Ground | Former league | Est. | Years in SANFL | SANFL Premierships | |
| Club | Colours | Nickname | Home Ground | Former league | Est. | Years in SANFL | Total | Most Recent |
|---|---|---|---|---|---|---|---|---|
| Adelaide (R) | | Crows | Adelaide Oval, City Centre | — | 1990 | 2014- | 0 | — |
| Central District | | Bulldogs | Elizabeth Oval, Elizabeth | — | 1959 | 1964- | 9 | 2010 |
| Glenelg | | Tigers | Glenelg Oval, Glenelg East | — | 1920 | 1921- | 7 | 2024 |
| North Adelaide | | Roosters | Prospect Oval, Prospect | ASFA | 1881 | 1888- | 14 | 2018 |
| Norwood | | Redlegs | Norwood Oval, Norwood | — | 1878 | 1878- | 32 | 2026 |
| Port Adelaide (R) | | Magpies | Alberton Oval, Alberton | — | 1870 | 1877- | 36 | 1999 |
| South Adelaide | | Panthers | Hickinbotham Oval, Noarlunga Downs | — | 1876 | 1877- | 11 | 1964 |
| Sturt | | Double Blues | Unley Oval, Unley | — | 1901 | 1901- | 16 | 2025 |
| West Adelaide | | Bloods | Richmond Oval, Richmond | ASFA | 1892 | 1897- | 9 | 2015 |
| Woodville- West Torrens | | Eagles | Woodville Oval, Woodville | — | 1990 | 1991- | 5 | 2021 |

- (R) denotes that the club is the reserves team of a senior AFL club

== Metropolitan ==
=== Adelaide Footy League ===
| Club | Colours | Nickname | Home Ground | Former League | Est. | Years in AdFL | Senior Premierships | |
| Club | Colours | Nickname | Home Ground | Former League | Est. | Years in AdFL | Total | Most recent |
|---|---|---|---|---|---|---|---|---|
| Adelaide Lutheran | | Bulldogs | Park 21 (Mirnu Wirra), Adelaide | ASFL | 1969 | 1985- | 8 | 2026 |
| Adelaide University | | Blacks | Park 12, University Oval, North Adelaide | – | 1906 | 1911- | 34 | 2010 |
| Angle Vale (Women's team only) | | Owls | Angle Vale Sport Complex, Angle Vale | – | 1998 | 2020- | 0 | - |
| Athelstone | | Raggies | Max Amber Sportfield, Paradise | SAFA | 1904 | 1996- | 2 | 2019 |
| Blackfriars Old Scholars | | Hounds | Park 2, St Dominics Oval (Pardipardinyilla), North Adelaide | – | 2005 | 2006- | 3 | 2014 |
| Brahma Lodge | | Tigers | Brahma Lodge Oval, Brahma Lodge | NMFL | 1962 | 1996- | 4 | 2021 |
| Brighton Districts and Old Scholars | | Bombers | Brighton Oval, Brighton | SFL | 1991 | 2017- | 4 | 2017 |
| Broadview | | Tigers | Broadview Oval, Broadview | NADFA | 1928 | 1964- | 20 | 2022 |
| CBC Old Collegians | | Dolphins | Park 15, King Rodney Park (Ityamai-Itpina), Adelaide | – | 1978 | 1978- | 8 | 2023 |
| Central United | | Bulldogs | Mofflin Reserve, Elizabeth Vale | NMFL | 1962 | 1995- | 2 | 2006 |
| Colonel Light Gardens | | Lions | Mortlock Park, Colonel Light Gardens | – | 1931 | 1931-1932, 1937-1941, 1946-1975, 1991- | 8 | 2007 |
| Eastern Park | | Demons | Dwight Reserve South, Elizabeth Park | NMFL | 1962 | 1995- | 4 | 2024 |
| Edwardstown | | Towns | Edwardstown Oval, Edwardstown | SFL | 1919 | 1996-2008, 2016- | 3 | 2005 |
| Elizabeth | | Eagles | Elizabeth Oval, Elizabeth | NMFL | 1956 | 1995- | 3 | 2025 |
| Fitzroy | | Lions | Sam Johnson Sportsground, Renown Park | – | 1987 | 1987- | 6 | 2025 |
| Flinders Park | | Reds | Flinders Park Oval, Flinders Park | SAFA | 1927 | 1933, 1949-1977, 1996- | 14 | 2023 |
| Flinders University | | Double Blues | Flinders University Oval, Bedford Park | – | 1966 | 1966-1980, 1982-2013, 2015- | 5 | 2002 |
| Gaza | | Eagles | Klemzig Oval, Klemzig | NADFA | 1921 | 1962- | 10 | 2026 |
| Gepps Cross | | Rams | Duncan Fraser Reserve, Northfield | SAFA | 1952 | 1984- | 8 | 2006 |
| Glenunga (Hyde Park 1960-67) | | Rams | Webb Oval, Glenunga | ETFA | 1954 | 1960- | 11 | 2019 |
| Golden Grove | | Kookaburras | Harpers Field, Golden Grove | – | 1995 | 1996- | 6 | 2023 |
| Goodwood Saints | | Saints | Goodwood Oval, Millswood | – | 1985 | 1985- | 15 | 2020 |
| Greenacres | | Dragons | LJ Lewis Reserve, Northfield | NNFA | 1967 | 1973-2019, 2021- | 9 | 2026 |
| Hackham | | Hawks | Hackham Sports Complex, Morphett Vale | SFL | 1976 | 2021- | 0 | - |
| Happy Valley (Women's team only) | | Vikings | Happy Valley Oval, Aberfoyle Park | – | 1951 | 2017- | 0 | - |
| Hectorville | | Hounds | Daly Oval, Hectorville | SAFA | 1961 | 1990- | 8 | 2022 |
| Henley (Henley Greek 1994-97) | | Sharks | Henley Oval, Henley Beach | – | 1994 | 1994- | 8 | 2026 |
| Hope Valley | | Demons | Hope Valley Sporting Club, Hope Valley | NMFL | 1906 | 1987- | 3 | 2019 |
| Houghton Districts (Banksia Park High OS 1982-86, Banksia Park 1987-88) | | Raiders | Houghton Memorial Oval, Houghton | – | 1995 | 1995- | 1 | 1999 |
| Ingle Farm | | Bulldogs | Rowe Park, Ingle Farm | SAFA | 1968 | 1989- | 5 | 2023 |
| Kenilworth | | Kookaburras | St. Marys Park, St Marys | YMCAFA | 1907 | 1914-1915, 1924-1985, 1991- | 8 | 2013 |
| Kilburn | | Chics | Blair Athol Reserve, Blair Athol | NADFA | 1923 | 1958- | 21 | 2024 |
| Lockleys | | Demons | Lockleys Oval, Lockleys | SMFL | 1951 | 1986- | 3 | 2020 |
| Loreto OS | | | Campbelltown Memorial Oval, Paradise | – | 2022 | 2022- | 1 | 2023 |
| Marion | | Rams | Marion Oval, Marion | SFL | 1891 | 2018- | 2 | 2025 |
| Mawson Lakes (St Paul's OS 1980-2009) | | Saints | Mawson Lakes Oval, Mawson Lakes | – | 1978 | 1993- | 0 | - |
| Mitcham (Mitcham District 1968-69) | | Hawks | Price Memorial Oval, Hawthorn | SMFL | 1908 | 1968-1975, 1985- | 5 | 2024 |
| Mitchell Park | | Lions | Mitchell Park Oval, Mitchell Park | SFL | 1969 | 2001- | 3 | 2015 |
| Modbury | | Hawks | Modbury Oval, Ridgehaven | SAFA | 1862 | 1988- | 15 | 2016 |
| Morphettville Park | | Roos | Kellett Reserve Oval, Morphettville | SFL | 1958 | 2017 | 1 | 2021 |
| North Haven (Port Adelaide Presbyterian 1980-89) | | Magpies | Largs North Oval, Largs North | ASFL | 1935 | 1980- | 2 | 2021 |
| Old Ignatians | | Iggies | Park 25, Karen Rolton Oval (Narnungga), Adelaide | – | 1972 | 1972- | 8 | 2021 |
| O'Sullivan Beach/Lonsdale | | Lions | Lonsdale Oval, Morphett Vale | SFL | 2001 | 2018- | 0 | - |
| Para Hills | | Big Reds | The Paddocks, Para Hills West | NMFL | 1974 | 1978-1989, 1995-2015, 2017- | 5 | 2024 |
| Payneham Norwood Union | | Falcons | Payneham Oval, Payneham | – | 1995 | 1996- | 6 | 2019 |
| Pembroke OS (Kings OC 1932-77) | | Kings | Haslam Oval, Kensington Park | – | 1932 | 1936-1940, 1946- | 11 | 2022 |
| PHOS Camden | | Phantoms | Camden Oval, Novar Gardens | – | 1994 | 1994- | 8 | 2015 |
| Plympton | | Bulldogs | Plympton Oval, Plympton Park | SAFA | 1937 | 1996- | 4 | 2025 |
| Pooraka | | Bulls | Lindblom Park, Pooraka | SAFA | 1920 | 1996- | 4 | 2021 |
| Port District | | Magpies | Largs Reserve, Largs Bay | SAFA | 1979 | 1984- | 11 | 2025 |
| Portland | | Thunder | Allen Iversen Reserve, Port Adelaide | – | 1997 | 1997- | 3 | 2013 |
| Prince Alfred OC | | Reds | Park 9, Bundey's Paddock (Tidlangga), North Adelaide | – | 1926 | 1926-1940, 1946- | 13 | 2023 |
| Pulteney | | Navy Blues | Park 20, Morgan Oval, Adelaide | – | 1936 | 1936-1940, 1946-1949, 1951-1994, 1997- | 11 | 2017 |
| Rosewater | | Bulldogs | Eric Sutton Reserve, Rosewater | PADFA | 1885 | 1949- | 8 | 2003 |
| Rostrevor OC (Christian Brothers OC 1923-73) | | ROCS | Campbelltown Memorial Oval, Paradise | – | 1923 | 1936-1939, 1947-1949, 1962- | 13 | 2024 |
| Sacred Heart OC | | SHOCs | Sacred Heart College Champagnat Campus, Mitchell Park | – | 1968 | 1968- | 4 | 2011 |
| Salisbury | | Magpies | Salisbury Oval, Salisbury | NMFL | 1883 | 1995- | 3 | 2007 |
| Salisbury North | | Hawks | Salisbury North Oval, Salisbury North | SAFA | 1953 | 1996- | 1 | 2026 |
| Scotch OC | | None | Scotch College Oval, Torrens Park | – | 1929 | 1929-1933, 1935-1939, 1946-1956, 1958- | 11 | 2026 |
| Seaton Ramblers | | Rams | Pedlar Oval, Seaton | WTDFA | 1958 | 1961- | 9 | 2026 |
| Smithfield | | Panthers | Smithfield Oval, Smithfield | NMFL | 1965 | 1995-2010, 2012-2020, 2023- | 2 | 2015 |
| SMOSH West Lakes | | Lions | Jubilee Reserve, West Lakes Shore | – | 1996 | 1996- | 3 | 2007 |
| St Paul's OS | | SPOS, Saints | St. Paul's College, Gilles Plains | – | 2015 | 2015- | 0 | - |
| St. Peters OC | | SPOCs | The Caterer Oval, St Peter's College, Hackney | – | 1928 | 1928-1940, 1946- | 14 | 2018 |
| Tea Tree Gully | | Gullies, Wolves | Pertaringa Oval, Banksia Park | SAFA | 1862 | 1988- | 8 | 2020 |
| Trinity OS | | Lions | Trinity College Gawler Campus, Evanston South | – | 2006 | 2006- | 2 | 2022 |
| Unley Mercedes Jets (Unley High OS 1970-79, Unley 1980-2011) | | Jets | Kingswood Oval, Kingswood | – | 1970 | 1970- | 5 | 2015 |
| Walkerville | | Cats | Walkerville Oval, Walkerville | SAFA | 1901 | 1936-1979, 1990- | 14 | 2020 |
| West Croydon | | Hawks | Fawk Reserve, Athol Park | NNFA | 1961 | 1974- | 6 | 2010 |
| Westminster OS | | Dragons | Glandore Oval, Glandore | – | 1969 | 1969-1981, 2000- | 7 | 2025 |
| Wilderness OS | | Lions, WOSA | Wilson Oval, Hackney | – | 2025 | 2026- | 1 | 2026 |
| Woodville South | | Cats | Ledger Reserve, Woodville South | SMFL | 1890 | 1979- | 10 | 2016 |

== Country ==
=== Adelaide Plains Football League ===
| Club | Colours | Nickname | Home Ground | Former League | Est. | Years in APFL | APFL Senior Premierships | |
| Club | Colours | Nickname | Home Ground | Former League | Est. | Years in APFL | Total | Years |
|---|---|---|---|---|---|---|---|---|
| Angle Vale | | Owls | Angle Vale Oval, Angle Vale | AdFL | 1998 | 2016– | 0 | - |
| Balaklava | | Peckers | Balaklava Oval, Balaklava | WFA | 1903 | 1940–2019; 2021– | 13 | 2011 |
| Hamley Bridge | | Bombers | Hamley Bridge Sports and Community Centre, Hamley Bridge | GDFL | 1907 | 1936–1963, 1984– | 9 | 2014 |
| Hummocks Watchman Eagles | | Eagles | Port Wakefield Oval, Port Wakefield and Lochiel Oval, Lochiel | – | 1995 | 1995–2019; 2021– | 6 | 2019 |
| Mallala | | Magpies | Mallala Oval, Mallala | – | | 1904– | 28 | 2025 |
| Two Wells | | Roosters | Two Wells Oval, Two Wells | GDFL | c.1911 | 1909–1927, 1932–1938, 1987– | 9 | 2026 |
| United | | Tigers | Long Plains Recreation Ground, Long Plains | – | 1964 | 1964– | 3 | 2002 |
| Virginia | | Rams | Virginia Sports Oval, Virginia | NMFL | 1907 | 1909–1913, 1919, 1995– | 4 | 2015 |

=== Barossa Light & Gawler Football Association ===
| Club | Colours | Nickname | Home Ground | Former League | Est. | Years in BLGFA | BLGFA Senior Premierships | |
| Club | Colours | Nickname | Home Ground | Former League | Est. | Years in BLGFA | Total | Years |
|---|---|---|---|---|---|---|---|---|
| Angaston | | Panthers | Angas Recreation Park, Angaston | BLFA | 1879 | 1987- | 1 | 2003 |
| Barossa District | | Bulldogs | Williamstown Oval, Williamstown | HFL | 1979 | 1991- | 6 | 2017 |
| Freeling | | Redlegs | Freeling Football Oval, Freeling | BLFA | 1890 | 1987- | 1 | 1994 |
| Gawler Central | | Tigers | Gawler Oval, Gawler | GDFL | 1889 | 1987- | 4 | 2020 |
| Kapunda | | Bombers | Dutton Park, Kapunda | BLFA | 1866 | 1987- | 2 | 2005 |
| Light (Merged women's team of Freeling and Kapunda) | | Wheaties | Dutton Park, Kapunda and Freeling Football Oval, Freeling | – | 2022 | 2022- | 0 | - |
| Nuriootpa Rover | | Tigers | Centennial Park Oval, Nuriootpa | BLFA | Late 19th century | 1987- | 9 | 2025 |
| South Gawler | | Lions | South Gawler Oval, Gawler South | GDFL | 1889 | 1987- | 6 | 2026 |
| Tanunda | | Magpies | Tanunda Recreation Park, Tanunda | BLFA | 1908 | 1987- | 8 | 2019 |
| Willaston | | Donnybrooks | Elliot Goodger Memorial Reserve, Willaston | GDFL | 1889 | 1987- | 3 | 2024 |

=== Eastern Eyre Football League ===
| Club | Colours | Nickname | Home Ground | Former League | Est. | Years in EEFL | EEFL Senior Premierships | |
| Club | Colours | Nickname | Home Ground | Former League | Est. | Years in EEFL | Total | Years |
|---|---|---|---|---|---|---|---|---|
| Central Eyre United | | Storm | Wudinna Oval, Wudinna; Kyancutta Oval, Kyancutta and Warramboo Oval, Warramboo | – | 2021 | 2021- | 1 | 2024 |
| Cowell | | Cats | Cowell Oval, Cowell | CJFL | 1963 | 1989- | 5 | 2009 |
| Eastern Ranges | | Eagles | Cleve Oval, Cleve and Rudall Oval, Rudall | – | 2012 | 2012- | 4 | 2026 |
| Kimba Districts | | Tigers | Kimba Recreation Reserve, Kimba | – | 1989 | 1989- | 14 | 2025 |
| Ports | | Magpies | Arno Football Oval, Arno Bay and Port Neill Sporting Complex, Port Neill | – | 1989 | 1989- | 4 | 2023 |

=== Far North Football League ===
| Club | Jumper | Nickname | Home ground | Est. | Years in FNFL | FNFL Senior Premierships | |
| Club | Jumper | Nickname | Home ground | Est. | Years in FNFL | Total | Years |
|---|---|---|---|---|---|---|---|
| East Roxby (Andamooka 1989-2014) | | Roos | Roxby Downs Town Oval, Roxby Downs | 1988 | 1989– | 4 | 2007 |
| Hornridge | | Magpies | Roxby Downs Town Oval, Roxby Downs | 1997 | 1997– | 6 | 2021 |
| Olympic Dam | | Devils | Roxby Downs Town Oval, Roxby Downs | 1986 | 1987– | 14 | 2022 |
| Roxby Districts | | Miners | Roxby Downs Town Oval, Roxby Downs | 1986 | 1986– | 16 | 2026 |

=== Great Flinders Football League ===
| Club | Jumper | Moniker | Home Ground | Former League | Est. | Years in GFFL | GFFL Senior Premierships | |
| Club | Jumper | Moniker | Home Ground | Former League | Est. | Years in GFFL | Total | Years |
|---|---|---|---|---|---|---|---|---|
| Cummins Ramblers (Cockaleechie 1946-47) | | Magpies | Cummins Oval, Cummins | – | 1919 | 1919- | 42 | 2017 |
| Cummins Kapinnie | | Cougars | Cummins Oval, Cummins and Kapinnie Oval, Kapinnie | – | 1997 | 1997- | 2 | 2001 |
| Elliston Districts | | Roosters | Elliston Oval, Elliston; Minnipa Oval, Minnipa and Poochera Oval, Poochera | – | 2021 | 2021- | 0 | - |
| Eyre United | | Saints | Ungarra Oval, Ungarra | PLFL | 1963 | 1971- | 0 | - |
| Lock | | Roos | Lock Oval, Lock | LHFL | 1915 | 1971- | 4 | 2026 |
| Tumby Bay | | Blues | Tumby Bay Oval, Tumby Bay | PLFL | 1906 | 1981- | 4 | 2009 |
| United Yeelanna | | Eagles | Karkoo Oval, Karkoo | – | 1964 | 1964- | 14 | 2024 |

=== Great Southern Football League ===
| Club | Colours | Nickname | Home Ground | Former League | Est. | Years in GSFL | GSFL Senior Premierships | |
| Club | Colours | Nickname | Home Ground | Former League | Est. | Years in GSFL | Total | Years |
|---|---|---|---|---|---|---|---|---|
| Encounter Bay (Bay Valley Rovers 1954-56) | | Eagles | Encounter Bay Recreation Reserve, Encounter Bay | – | 1954 | 1954- | 10 | 2015 |
| Goolwa/Port Elliot | | Magpies | Goolwa Oval, Goolwa | – | 2001 | 2001- | 0 | - |
| Langhorne Creek | | Hawks | Langhorne Creek Oval, Langhorne Creek | HFL | 1906 | 1978- | 8 | 2020 |
| McLaren Districts | | Eagles | McLaren Vale Sporting Complex, McLaren Vale | SFL | 1998 | 2000- | 4 | 2026 |
| Mount Compass | | Bulldogs | Mount Compass Oval, Mount Compass | SFL | 1924 | 1953- | 5 | 2017 |
| Myponga-Sellicks | | Mudlarks | Myponga Oval, Myponga | SFL | | 1967- | 4 | 2024 |
| Strathalbyn | | Roosters | Strathalbyn Oval, Strathalbyn | HCFA | 1879 | 1930, 1963- | 11 | 2014 |
| Victor Harbor | | Kangaroos | Victor Harbor Oval, Victor Harbor | – | 1885 | 1923- | 25 | 2025 |
| Willunga | | Demons | Willunga Recreation Reserve, Willunga | SFL | 1874 | 1986- | 10 | 2021 |
| Yankalilla | | Tigers | Yankalilla Memorial Park, Yankalilla | SFL | 1889 | 1935-1955, 1968- | 3 | 1985 |

=== Hills Football League ===
| Club | Jumper | Nickname | Home Ground | Former League | Est | Years in HFL | HFL Senior Premierships | |
| Club | Jumper | Nickname | Home Ground | Former League | Est | Years in HFL | Total | Years |
|---|---|---|---|---|---|---|---|---|
| Birdwood | | Roosters | Birdwood Oval, Birdwood | TVFA | 1880s | 1967- | 6 | 1994 |
| Blackwood | | Woods | Blackwood Hill Reserve, Blackwood | SMFL | 1912 | 1987– | 3 | 2017 |
| Bridgewater (Bridgewater-Callington 2013-25) | | Raiders | Bridgewater Oval, Bridgewater | – | 2012 | 2013-2022, 2024- | 2 | 2016 |
| Echunga | | Demons | Echunga Recreation Ground, Echunga | HCFL | 1903 | 1967– | 1 | 2014 |
| Gumeracha | | Magpies | Gumeracha Oval, Gumeracha | TVFA | 1887 | 1967- | 6 | 2023 |
| Hahndorf | | Magpies | Hahndorf Oval, Hahndorf | HCFL | 1887 | 1967– | 13 | 2024 |
| Kangarilla | | Double Blues | Kangarilla Recreation Ground, Kangarilla | HCFL, SFL | 1901 | 1967–1978, 2006- | 5 | 2006 |
| Kersbrook | | Blues/Brookers | Kersbrook Soldiers Memorial Park, Kersbrook | ETFA | 1912 | 1971- | 10 | 2021 |
| Lobethal | | Tigers | Lobethal Recreation Ground, Lobethal | TVFA | 1901 | 1967– | 5 | 2022 |
| Macclesfield | | Blood and Tars | Macclesfield Oval, Macclesfield | HCFL, SFL | 1880 | 1967–1983, 1987- | 6 | 2025 |
| Meadows | | Bulldogs | Stringybark Park, Meadows | HCFL, SFL | 1903 | 1967-1982, 2001- | 5 | 2004 |
| Milang | | Panthers | Milang Oval, Milang | GSFL | 1881 | 1986-2005, 2010-2017, 2021- | 0 | - |
| Mount Barker | | Barkeroos | Hanson Oval, Mount Barker | HCFL | 1881 | 1967– | 8 | 2012 |
| Mount Lofty District | | Mountain Devils | Heathfield Oval, Heathfield | SAFA | 1978 | 1986– | 5 | 2014 |
| Nairne Bremer United | | Rams | Nairne Oval, Nairne | – | 1978 | 1978–1991, 1998– | 2 | 2025 |
| Onkaparinga Valley | | Bulldogs | Johnston Memorial Park, Balhannah | – | 1967 | 1967– | 3 | 2026 |
| Torrens Valley | | Mountain Lions | Centenary Park, Mount Torrens | – | 1997 | 1997- | 3 | 2010 |
| Uraidla Districts | | Demons | Uraidla Showgrounds, Uraidla | – | 1997 | 1997– | 5 | 2013 |

=== Kangaroo Island Football League ===
| Club | Guernsey | Nickname | Home Ground | Est. | Seasons in KIFL | KIFL Senior Premierships | |
| Club | Guernsey | Nickname | Home Ground | Est. | Seasons in KIFL | Total | Years |
|---|---|---|---|---|---|---|---|
| Dudley United | | Eagles | Penneshaw Oval, Penneshaw | 1965 | 1965- | 11 | 2016 |
| Kingscote | | Hounds | Soldiers Memorial Park, Kingscote | 1910 | 1946- | 13 | 2023 |
| Parndana (Seddon 1947, Settlement 1948-49) | | Roosters | Parndana Town Oval, Parndana | 1948 | 1948-1949, 1952, 1956- | 18 | 2013 |
| Western Districts | | Saints | Western Districts Community and Sports Club, Gosse | 1970 | 1970- | 17 | 2026 |
| Wisanger | | Panthers | Panther Park, Bay of Shoals | 1911 | 1946-2000, 2002- | 16 | 2021 |

=== Kowree-Naracoorte-Tatiara Football League ===
| Club | Jumper | Nickname | Home Ground | Former League | Est. | Years in comp | KNTFL Senior Premierships | |
| Club | Jumper | Nickname | Home Ground | Former League | Est. | Years in comp | Total | Years |
|---|---|---|---|---|---|---|---|---|
| Border Districts | | Eagles | Frances Recreation Reserve, Frances, Goroke Recreation Reserve, Goroke and Apsley Recreation Reserve Apsley | KNFL | 1951 | 1993– | 1 | 2023 |
| Bordertown | | Roosters | Bordertown Football Oval, Bordertown | TFL | 1908 | 1993– | 1 | 2012 |
| Keith | | Crows | Keith Oval, Keith | TFL | 1908 | 1993– | 2 | 2008 |
| Kingston | | Saints | Gall Park Oval, Kingston SE | KNFL | 1966 | 1993– | 1 | 2026 |
| Kybybolite | | Tigers | Kybybolite Oval, Kybybolite | KNFL | 1906 | 1993– | 0 | - |
| Lucindale | | Kangaroos | Lucindale Oval, Lucindale | KNFL | 1895 | 1993– | 4 | 2022 |
| Mundulla | | Tigers | Mundulla Showgrounds, Mundulla | TFL | 1905 | 1993– | 14 | 2025 |
| Naracoorte | | Demons | Naracoorte Sporting Complex, Naracoorte | KNFL | 1946 | 1993– | 3 | 2010 |
| Padthaway | | Lions | Padthaway Oval, Padthaway | KNFL | 1967 | 1993– | 3 | 2015 |

=== Limestone Coast Football Netball League ===
| Club | Colours | Nickname | Home Ground | Former League | Est. | Years in LCFNL | LCFNL Senior Premierships | |
| Club | Colours | Nickname | Home Ground | Former League | Est. | Years in LCFNL | Total | Years |
|---|---|---|---|---|---|---|---|---|
| East Gambier | | Bulldogs | McDonald Park, Mount Gambier | WBFL | 1938 | 2024– | 0 | – |
| Millicent | | Saints | McLaughlin Park, Millicent | WBFL | 1946 | 2024– | 1 | 2025 |
| North Gambier | | Tigers | Vansittart Park, Mount Gambier | WBFL | 1926 | 2024– | 0 | – |
| Penola | | Eagles | McCorquindale Park, Penola | KNTFL | 1865 | 2025– | 0 | – |
| South Gambier | | Demons | Blue Lake Sports Park, Mount Gambier | WBFL | 1926 | 2024– | 1 | 2026 |
| West Gambier | | Roos | Malseed Park, Mount Gambier | WBFL | 1938 | 2024– | 1 | 2024 |

=== Limestone Coast Women's Football League ===
| Club | Jumper | Nickname | Home Ground | Former League | Est. | Years in LCWFL | LCWFL Senior Premierships | |
| Club | Jumper | Nickname | Home Ground | Former League | Est. | Years in LCWFL | Total | Years |
|---|---|---|---|---|---|---|---|---|
| Kongorong | | Hawks | Kongorong Oval, Kongorong | – | 1953 | 2020– | 0 | – |
| Kybybolite | | Tigers | Kybybolite Oval, Kybybolite | – | 1906 | 2018– | 3 | 2024 |
| Mundulla | | Tigers | Mundulla Showgrounds, Mundulla | – | 1905 | 2019– | 1 | 2023 |
| Nangwarry | | Saints | Nangwarry Football Oval, Nangwarry | – | 1946 | 2024– | 0 | – |
| Millicent | | Saints | McLaughlin Park, Millicent | – | 1946 | 2017– | 0 | – |
| North Gambier | | Tigers | Vansittart Park, Mount Gambier | – | 1926 | 2017– | 1 | 2025 |
| Penola | | Eagles | McCorquindale Park, Penola | – | 1865 | 2019– | 1 | 2024 |
| South Gambier | | Demons | Blue Lake Sports Park, Mount Gambier | – | 1926 | 2017– | 0 | – |

=== Mid North Open Women ===
| Club | Jumper | Nickname | Home Ground | Former League | Est. | Years in MSEFL | MSEFL Senior Premierships | |
| Club | Jumper | Nickname | Home Ground | Former League | Est. | Years in MSEFL | Total | Years |
|---|---|---|---|---|---|---|---|---|
| Central Augusta | | Bloods | ETSA Oval, Port Augusta | – | 1915 | 2020- | 1 | 2025 |
| Crystal Brook | | Roosters | Crystal Brook Oval, Crystal Brook | – | 1887 | 2020- | 4 | 2026 |
| Port | | Bulldogs | Port Oval, Port Pirie South | – | 1909 | 2020- | 0 | - |
| West Augusta | | Hawks | Chinnery Park, Port Augusta West | – | 1915 | 2023- | 0 | - |

=== Mid South Eastern Football League ===
| Club | Jumper | Nickname | Home Ground | Former League | Est. | Years in MSEFL | MSEFL Senior Premierships | |
| Club | Jumper | Nickname | Home Ground | Former League | Est. | Years in MSEFL | Total | Years |
|---|---|---|---|---|---|---|---|---|
| Glencoe | | Murphies | Glencoe Football Oval, Glencoe | SEFA | 1910 | 1936– | 15 | 2007 |
| Hatherleigh | | Eagles | Hatherleigh Sport & Recreation Centre, Hatherleigh | – | 1946 | 1947– | 8 | 2026 |
| Kalangadoo | | Magpies | Kalangadoo War Memorial Oval, Kalangadoo | SEFA | 1900 | 1936– | 13 | 2023 |
| Kongorong | | Hawks | Kongorong Oval, Kongorong | SEBFL | 1953 | 1958– | 4 | 1988 |
| Mount Burr (Millicent Central 1936-45) | | Mozzies | Mount Burr Football Oval, Mount Burr | SEFA | | 1936- | 22 | 2017 |
| Nangwarry | | Saints | Nangwarry Football Oval, Nangwarry | – | 1946 | 1946–1957 1965– | 4 | 1999 |
| Port MacDonnell | | Demons | Port MacDonnell Football Oval, Port MacDonnell | SEBFL | 1890s | 1959- | 5 | 2021 |
| Robe | | Roosters | Robe Oval, Robe | SPFA | 1928 | 1966– | 4 | 2018 |
| Tantanoola | | Tigers | Tantanoola Oval, Tantanoola | SEFA | 1894 | 1936– | 6 | 2006 |

=== Murray Valley Football Netball League ===
| Club | Jumper | Nickname | Home Ground | Former League | Est. | Years in MVFNL | MVFNL Premierships | |
| Club | Jumper | Nickname | Home Ground | Former League | Est. | Years in MVFNL | Total | Years |
|---|---|---|---|---|---|---|---|---|
| Browns Well | | Bombers | Paruna Oval, Paruna | RIFL | 1969 | 2023– | 1 | 2026 |
| Paringa | | Swans | Paringa Oval, Paringa | RIFL | 1961 | 2023– | 0 | – |
| Sedan-Cambrai | | Magpies | Cambrai Sports Club, Cambrai | RIFL | 1922 | 2023– | 1 | 2023 |
| Ramco | | Roosters | Ramco Sporting Facility, Ramco | RIFL | 1909 | 2023– | 0 | – |
| Wunkar | | Bulldogs | Wunkar Oval, Wunkar | RIFL | 1971 | 2023– | 0 | – |

=== North Eastern Football League ===
| Club | Jumper | Nickname | Home Ground | Former League | Est. | Years in NEFL | NEFL Senior Premierships | |
| Club | Jumper | Nickname | Home Ground | Former League | Est. | Years in NEFL | Total | Years |
|---|---|---|---|---|---|---|---|---|
| Blyth Snowtown | | Cats | Blyth Oval, Blyth and Snowtown Oval, Snowtown | – | 1988 | 1988- | 5 | 2019 |
| Brinkworth Spalding Redhill (BSR) | | Tigers | Brinkworth Oval, Brinkworth; Spalding Oval, Spalding and Redhill Oval, Redhill | – | 1987 | 1987- | 14 | 2025 |
| Burra Booborowie Hallett (BBH) | | Rams | Burra Sporting Complex, Burra | – | 1986 | 1986- | 2 | 2011 |
| Eudunda Robertstown | | Southern Saints | Eudunda Oval, Eudunda and Robertstown Oval, Robertstown | – | 2010 | 2010- | 0 | - |
| Mintaro Manoora | | Eagles | Mintaro Oval, Mintaro and Centenary Park, Manoora | MNFL | 1969 | 1976- | 10 | 2026 |
| North Clare | | Roosters | Clare Oval, Clare | MNFL | 1960 | 1964- | 8 | 1997 |
| Riverton Saddleworth Marrabel United (RSMU) | | Hawks | Riverton Oval, Riverton | BLGFA | 1976 | 1998- | 6 | 2016 |
| South Clare | | Demons | Clare Oval, Clare | MNFL | 1960 | 1964- | 7 | 2005 |

=== Northern Areas Football Association ===
| Club | Jumper | Nickname | Home Ground | Former League | Est. | Years in NAFA | NAFA Senior Premierships | |
| Club | Jumper | Nickname | Home Ground | Former League | Est. | Years in NAFA | Total | Years |
|---|---|---|---|---|---|---|---|---|
| Booleroo Centre Melrose Wilmington (BMW) | | Lions | Booleroo Oval, Booleroo Centre; Melrose Oval, Melrose and Wilmington Oval, Wilmington | – | 1991 | 1991– | 2 | 2005 |
| Broughton Mundoora | | Eagles | Port Broughton Town Oval, Port Broughton | – | 1984 | 1984– | 12 | 2024 |
| Crystal Brook | | Roosters | Crystal Brook Oval, Crystal Brook | BCFA | 1887 | 1909–1911, 1913–1930, 1935– | 24 | 2025 |
| Jamestown Peterborough | | Magpies | Victoria Park, Jamestown | – | 2003 | 2003– | 4 | 2026 |
| Orroroo | | Kangaroos | Orroroo Oval, Orroroo | FFA | 1885 | 1909–?, 1972– | 13 | 2023 |
| Southern Flinders | | Tigers | Gladstone Oval, Gladstone; Wirrabara Oval, Wirrabara and Laura Oval, Laura | – | 2002 | 2002– | 3 | 2013 |

=== Port Lincoln Football League ===
| Club | Jumper | Nickname | Home Ground | Former League | Est. | Years in PLFL | PLFL Senior Premierships | |
| Club | Jumper | Nickname | Home Ground | Former League | Est. | Years in PLFL | Total | Years |
|---|---|---|---|---|---|---|---|---|
| Boston | | Tigers | Poole Oval, Port Lincoln | – | 1972 | 1972– | 1 | 1986 |
| Lincoln South | | Eagles | Centenary Oval, Port Lincoln | – | 1946 | 1946– | 15 | 2025 |
| Mallee Park | | Peckers | Mallee Park Oval, Port Lincoln | – | 1980 | 1980– | 16 | 2016 |
| Marble Range | | Magpies | Wangary Oval, Wangary | GFFL | 1938 | 1938–1946, 1957– | 13 | 2026 |
| Tasman Imperial | | Roosters | Ravendale Sporting Complex, Port Lincoln | – | 1946 | 1946– | 15 | 2020 |
| Wayback | | Demons | Centenary Oval, Port Lincoln | – | 1903 | 1910– | 33 | 2017 |

=== Riverland Football League ===
| Club | Jumper | Nickname | Home Ground | Former League | Est. | Years in RFL | RFL Senior Premierships | |
| Club | Jumper | Nickname | Home Ground | Former League | Est. | Years in RFL | Total | Years |
|---|---|---|---|---|---|---|---|---|
| Barmera-Monash | | Roos | Memorial Oval, Barmera | – | 1957 | 1957– | 9 | 2025 |
| Berri | | Demons | Berri Oval, Berri | – | 1910 | 1910– | 25 | 2010 |
| Loxton | | Tigers | Loxton Oval, Loxton | – | 1946 | 1946– | 21 | 2006 |
| Loxton North | | Panthers | Loxton North Recreation Grounds, Loxton North | – | 1957 | 1964– | 10 | 2015 |
| Renmark | | Rovers | Renmark Oval, Renmark | – | 1923 | 1923– | 18 | 2024 |
| Waikerie | | Magpies | Waikerie Oval, Waikerie | – | 1929 | 1929– | 16 | 2026 |

=== River Murray Football League ===
| Club | Jumper | Nickname | Home Ground | Former League | Est. | Years in RMFL | RMFL Senior Premierships | |
| Club | Jumper | Nickname | Home Ground | Former League | Est. | Years in RMFL | Total | Years |
|---|---|---|---|---|---|---|---|---|
| Coorong | | Cats | Meningie Oval, Meningie; Coonalpyn Oval, Coonalpyn and Tintinara Oval, Tintinara | – | 2022 | 2023– | 2 | 2025 |
| Imperial | | Blues | Johnstone Park, Murray Bridge | – | 1931 | 1931– | 22 | 2022 |
| Jervois | | Bluds | Jervois Oval, Jervois | MDFA | 1926 | 1931– | 21 | 2026 |
| Mallee Districts | | Storm | Peake Oval, Peake and Karoonda Oval, Karoonda | – | 2022 | 2023– | 0 | - |
| Mannum | | Roos | Mannum Oval, Mannum | MRFA, TVFA | 1927 | 1933–1936, 1939–1957, 1964– | 7 | 2015 |
| Mypolonga | | Tigers | Mypolonga Memorial Oval, Mypolonga | MRFA | 1928 | 1931– | 8 | 2019 |
| Ramblers | | Roosters | LeMessurier Oval, Murray Bridge | – | 1931 | 1931– | 15 | 2016 |
| Southern Mallee | | Suns | Lameroo Sport Grounds, Lameroo and Pinnaroo Oval, Pinnaroo | – | 2022 | 2023– | 0 | - |
| Tailem Bend | | Eagles | Tailem Bend Football Club Oval, Tailem Bend | – | 1946 | 1946– | 14 | 2000 |

=== Southern Football League ===
| Club | Colours | Nickname | Home Ground | Former League | Est. | Years in SFL | SFL Senior Premierships | |
| Club | Colours | Nickname | Home Ground | Former League | Est. | Years in SFL | Total | Most recent |
|---|---|---|---|---|---|---|---|---|
| Aldinga | | Sharks | Aldinga Oval, Aldinga | – | 1879 | 1886-1907, 1909-1952, 1977-2019, 2021- | 9 | 1993 |
| Blackwood (Women only) | | Woods | Blackwood Hill Reserve, Blackwood | HFL | 1912 | 2025- | 0 | - |
| Christies Beach | | Saints | John Bice Memorial Oval, Christies Beach | – | 1964 | 1966- | 7 | 1994 |
| Cove | | Cobras | Cove Sports & Community Club, Hallett Cove | – | 1983 | 1984- | 1 | 1998 |
| Flagstaff Hill (Note: Formerly, "Brighton Methodist") | | Falcons (Note: formerly, Bushpigs) | Flagstaff Hill Recreation Ground, Flagstaff Hill | SMFL | 1963 | 1986- | 9 | 2026 |
| Happy Valley | | Vikings | Happy Valley Sports Park, Aberfoyle Park | SMFL | 1951 | 1980- | 8 | 2012 |
| Hackham (Women and juniors only) | | Hawks | Hackham Oval, Hackham | – | 1976 | 1977- | 1 | 1990 |
| Ironbank Cherry Gardens | | Thunderers | Cherry Gardens Ironbank Recreation Ground, Cherry Gardens | HFL | 1986 | 2024- | 0 | - |
| Morphett Vale | | Emus | Morphett Vale Memorial Sports Complex, Morphett Vale | – | 1895 | 1899-1913, 1915, 1924, 1928-1929, 1935, 1946-1951, 1953, 1963- | 8 | 2009 |
| Noarlunga | | Shoes | Noarlunga Football Oval, Old Noarlunga | AFA | 1897 | 1915-1935, 1938, 1951- | 10 | 2014 |
| Port Noarlunga | | Cockle Divers | Port Noarlunga Community Sports Complex, Port Noarlunga South | GSAFA | 1935 | 1947- | 5 | 2025 |
| Reynella | | Wineflies | Reynella Oval, Old Reynella | GSAFA | 1919 | 1919, 1948- | 8 | 2024 |

=== Spencer Gulf Football League ===
| Club | Colours | Nickname | Home Ground | Former League | Est. | Years in SGFL | SGFL Senior Premierships | |
| Club | Colours | Nickname | Home Ground | Former League | Est. | Years in SGFL | Total | Years |
|---|---|---|---|---|---|---|---|---|
| Central Augusta | | Bloods | ETSA Oval, Port Augusta | GNFA | 1915 | 1961- | 8 | 2011 |
| Port | | Bulldogs | Port Oval, Port Pirie South | PPFA | 1909 | 1961- | 14 | 2026 |
| Proprietary-Risdon | | Lions | Memorial Oval, Port Pirie | – | 1994 | 1994- | 4 | 2024 |
| Solomontown | | Cats | Memorial Oval, Port Pirie | PPFA | 1893 | 1961- | 7 | 2025 |
| South Augusta | | Bulldogs | Central Oval, Port Augusta | GNFA | 1912 | 1961- | 13 | 2020 |
| West Augusta | | Hawks | Chinnery Park, Port Augusta West | GNFA | 1915 | 1961- | 12 | 2013 |

=== Western Eyre Football League ===
| Club | Jumper | Nickname | Home Ground | Former League | Est. | Years in WEFL | WEFL Senior Premierships | |
| Club | Jumper | Nickname | Home Ground | Former League | Est. | Years in WEFL | Total | Years |
|---|---|---|---|---|---|---|---|---|
| Ceduna Blues (Note: Known as Ceduna-Smoky Bay until 1999 and Blues until 2022) | | Blues | Ceduna Sports Club, Ceduna | – | 1989 | 1989– | 5 | 2022 |
| Koonibba | | Roosters | Far West Aboriginal Sporting Complex, Thevenard | – | 1906 | 1909–1940, 1946– | 37 | 2017 |
| Thevenard | | Magpies | Thevenard Oval,Thevenard | – | 1927 | 1927– | 23 | 2015 |
| Western United | | Tigers | Penong Sports Ground, Penong | – | 1974 | 1974– | 14 | 2026 |
| West Coast | | Hawks | Streaky Bay Community Complex Oval, Streaky Bay | MWFL | 1999 | 2021– | 1 | 2021 |
| Wirrulla | | Bombers | Wirrulla Football Ground, Wirrulla | MWFL | 1919 | 2021– | 0 | - |

=== Whyalla Football League ===
| Club | Colours | Nickname | Former League | Est. | Years in WFL | WFL Senior Premierships | |
| Club | Colours | Nickname | Former League | Est. | Years in WFL | Total | Years |
|---|---|---|---|---|---|---|---|
| Central Augusta (Women's team only) | | Bloods | – | 1915 | 2025- | 0 | - |
| Central Augusta (Women's team only) | | Bloods | – | 1915 | 2025- | 0 | - |
| Central Whyalla | | Roosters | SGFL | 1920 | 1920-1960, 1967- | 29 | 2025 |
| North Whyalla | | Magpies | SGFL | 1919 | 1920-1960, 1967- | 18 | 2015 |
| Roopena | | Roos | – | 1968 | 1970 | 9 | 2026 |
| South Whyalla | | Demons | SGFL | | 1920-1960, 1967- | 13 | 1994 |
| Weeroona Bay | | Tigers | – | 1970 | 1970 | 4 | 1996 |
| West Whyalla (Army West 1941-44) | | Dragons | SGFL | 1941 | 1941-1960, 1967- | 22 | 2023 |
| West Augusta (Women's team only) | | Hawks | – | 1915 | 2025- | 0 | - |

=== Yorke Peninsula Football League ===
| Club | Colours | Nickname | Home Ground | Former League | Est. | Years in YVFL/YPFL | YVFL/YPFL Senior Premierships | |
| Club | Colours | Nickname | Home Ground | Former League | Est. | Years in YVFL/YPFL | Total | Years |
|---|---|---|---|---|---|---|---|---|
| Ardrossan | | Kangaroos | William Miller Oval, Ardrossan | – | 1904 | 1961– | 14 | 2004 |
| Bute | | Roosters | Billy Harris Memorial Oval, Bute | WAFA | 1892 | 1962–2019; 2021– | 5 | 1993 |
| Central Yorke | | Cougars | Maitland Oval, Maitland | – | 1996 | 1997– (Note: Merger of Arthurton and Maitland) | 1 | 2007 |
| CMS | | Crows | Curramulka Oval, Curramulka; Minlaton Oval, Minlaton and Stansbury Oval, Stansbury | – | 1994 | 1994– (Note: Merger of Curramulka, Minlaton and Stansbury) | 7 | 2025 |
| Kadina | | Bloods, Bloodhounds | Kadina Oval, Kadina | YPFA | 1878 | 1961– | 7 | 2026 |
| Moonta | | Demons | Moonta Football Oval, Moonta | YPFA | 1937 | 1961– | 6 | 2024 |
| Paskeville | | Magpies | Paskeville Oval, Paskeville | YPFA | 1910 | 1961– | 7 | 2015 |
| Southern Eagles | | Eagles | Warooka Oval, Warooka; Yorketown Oval, Yorketown and Edithburgh Oval, Edithburgh | – | 1994 | 1994– (Note: Merger of Edithburgh, Yorketown and Western United.) | 4 | 2019 |
| Wallaroo | | Bulldogs | Wallaroo Oval, Wallaroo | YPFA | 1888 | 1961– | 8 | 2000 |
