= Mount Barker Football Club (South Australia) =

Mount Barker

Names
- Full name: Mount Barker Football Club
- Nickname(s): Roos

Club details
- Founded: 1881; 144 years ago
- Colours: blue white
- Competition: Hills Football League
- Coach: Andrew Bruce
- Premierships: 8 (Hills FL Central Div/Div 1)
- Ground(s): Hanson Oval

Uniforms
Home

Other information
- Official website: www.mbfc.com.au

The Mount Barker Football Club, nicknamed the Roos, is an Australian rules football club based in the Adelaide Hills town of Mount Barker, South Australia, that competes in the Hills Football League.

== History ==
The Mount Barker Football Club was formed in 1881, although at the time there was no formal football competition within the Adelaide Hills region. During the club's first twenty years of competition games were played between clubs in the Hills, Mount Lofty and Torrens Valley areas and even clubs such as Norwood and Port Adelaide who were competing in the former South Australian Football Association at the time. Despite the design and shade of blue that have both changed over time, the official colours of the Mount Barker Football Club have always been blue and white. Two ovals were used in the club's early days, one being Mr Weld's paddock, now known as Weld Park, and Dunn Park, which is now home to the Mount Barker Caravan Park.

Mount Barker were one of the original five foundation clubs of the Hills Football Association when it was founded in 1902 and reached the league's inaugural Grand Final, only to go down to Woodside. Mount Barker had left the association during the middle of the 1906 season alleging that league officials had exhibited bias towards the club, after they had previously won premierships in 1903 and 1905. The club re-entered the association in 1907 and became one of the more dominant clubs in the association until 1929 when the Roos briefly competed in the South Australian Amateur Football League from 1930 to 1932. This saw the club decline due to extra travel for games and players retiring.

Mount Barker joined the Mount Lofty Football Association in 1933 and remained there until 1937 where the Roos took out the 1933 and 1935 premierships before moving back to the Hills Football Association in 1938 where they remained until 1953. Mount Barker went through the 1938 season undefeated and beating Hahndorf in the Grand Final, and winning another premiership in 1948. Mount Barker went to the Hills Central Football Association in 1954 and remained there until 1966, where the club won a total of five premierships and were runners up three times.

The Hills Central Football Association, Hills Football Association and Torrens Valley Football Association merged to form the current Hills Football League in 1967 where Mount Barker was placed within the top tier along with seven other clubs, winning their first two flags within the new three-tier competition in 1969 and 1970. Mount Barker is currently only 3 inaugural members of the Hills Football League, along with Lobethal and Onkaparinga Valley.

Mount Barker's most recent premiership was in 2012, beating Uraidla Districts by 15 points.

The Mount Barker Football Club introduced their first women's football team in 2016 that took out the South Australian Women's Football League Division 2 title of that year, beating Mount Lofty in the Grand Final by 7 points at Guardall Security Stadium.
