= Ashton, South Australia =

Ashton
- Town
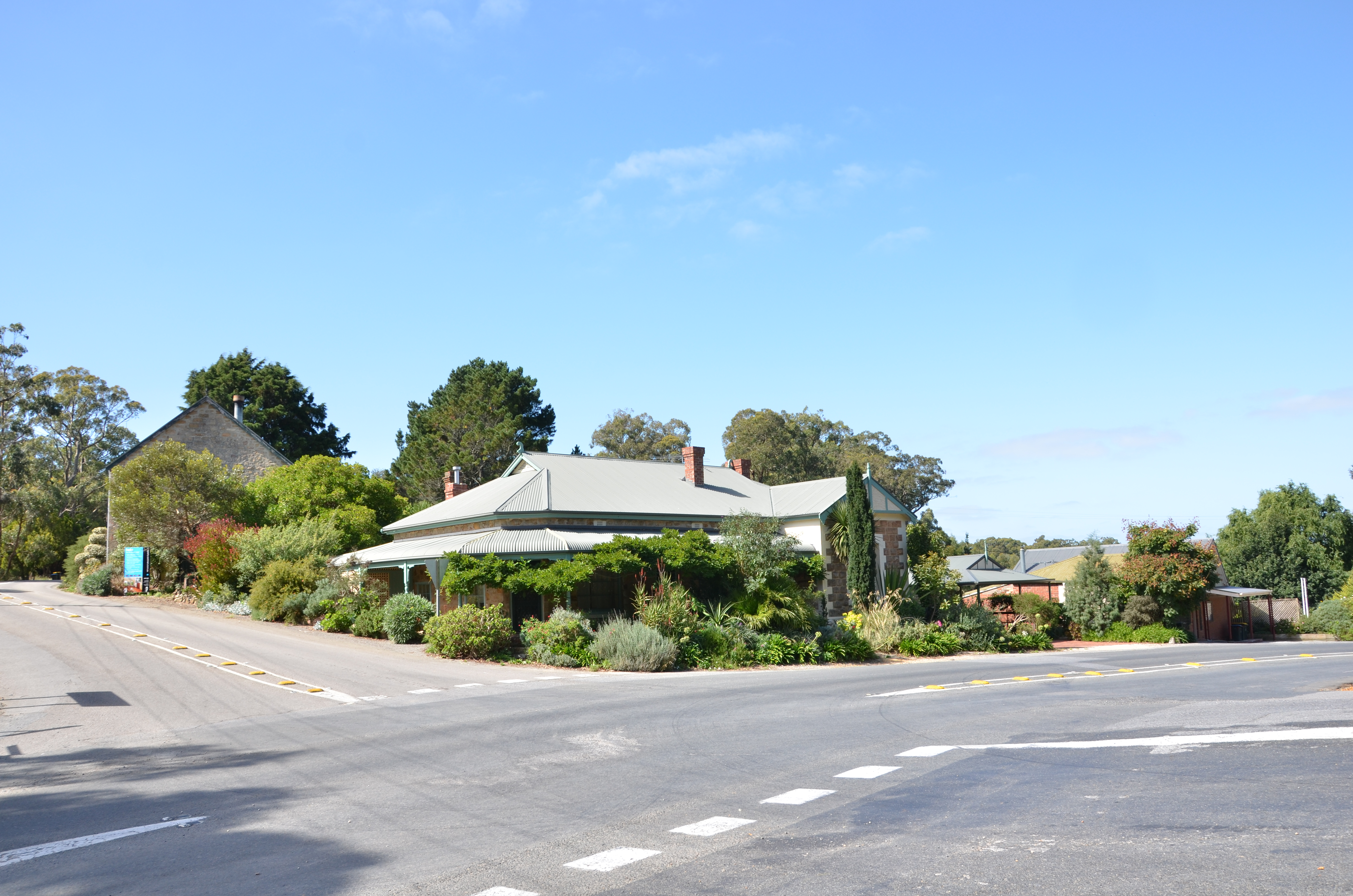
- Interactive map of Ashton
- Coordinates: 34°56′27″S 138°44′13″E
- Country: Australia
- State: South Australia
- LGA: Adelaide Hills Council
- Location: 17 km (11 mi) east of Adelaide
- Established: 1858

Government
  - State electorate: Morialta
  - Federal division: Mayo

Population
  - Total: 481 (SAL 2021)
- Postcode: 5137
Localities around Ashton
Norton Summit		Marble Hill
Horsnell Gully	Ashton	Basket Range
Greenhill	Summertown	Uraidla

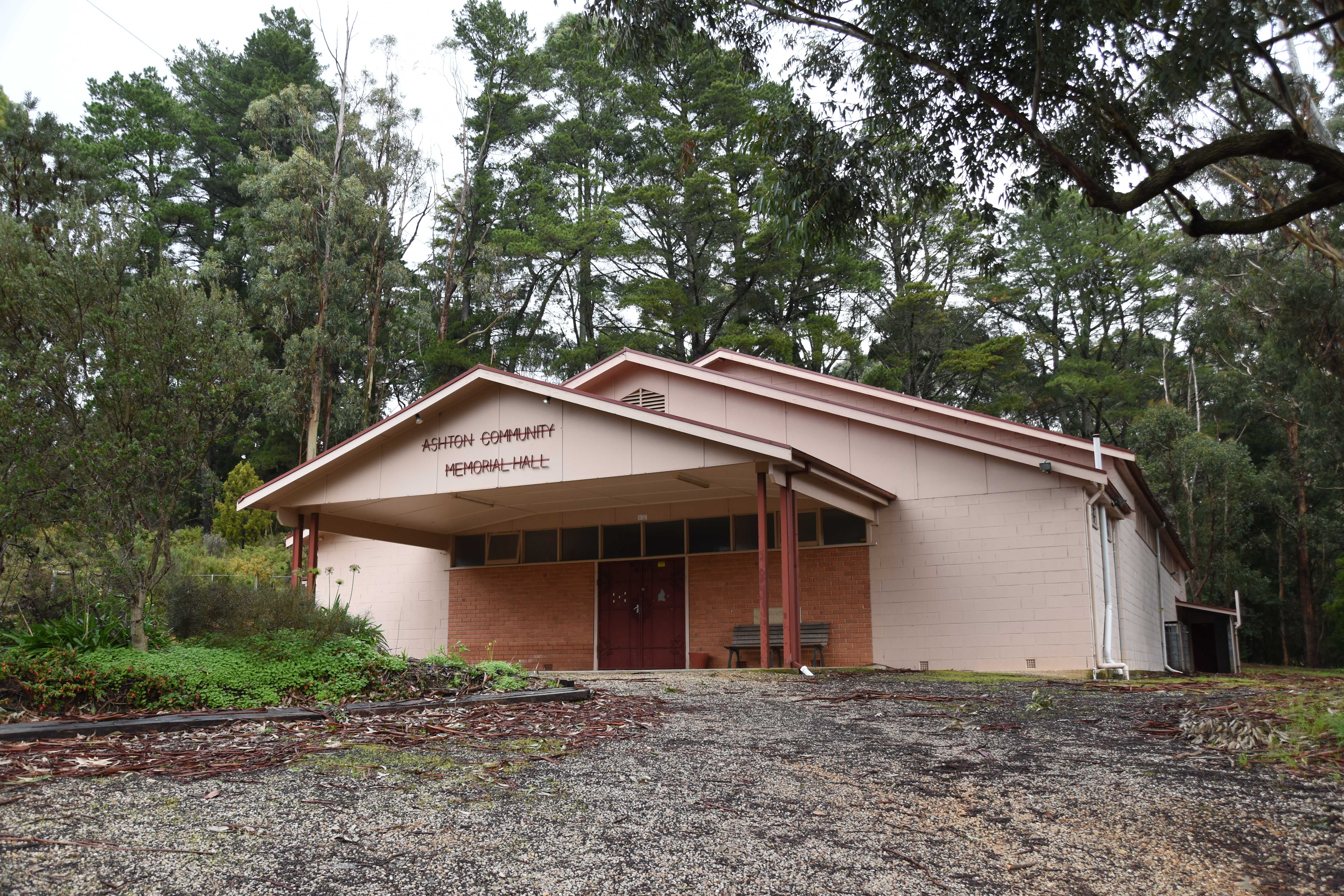
Ashton Community Memorial Hall

Ashton is a town in the Adelaide Hills in South Australia. It was named by George Hunt in 1858 after his home Ashton in England. Ashton is from the old English word aesctun, which means "ash tree town".

== General information ==
The Ashton General Store, Bakery and original post office was established in 1890 by Herbert and Emily Lovibond (née Stephens) until 1941. During this time it was also known as "Mrs Lovibonds Emporium". The current Ashton Community Post Office operates from Monday to Friday from 8:30 to 10:00am.

The Ashton oval was home to the Eastern Rangers Football Club (Australian rules) until it merged with Uraidla Football Club in 1997. The clubrooms and grounds are still home to Eastern Ranges Cricket Club as well as a venue for Scout meetings and private functions. The venue is now also home to the Rangers Junior Soccer club. Facilities include one football/cricket oval, practice nets, tennis courts, changing rooms, toilets, bar, kitchen and club rooms.

Located in the town's center, the Ashton Community Memorial Hall is available for hire for public and private functions. Facilities include full kitchen, internal and external canteen windows, toilets, car park and stage in addition to the large, wood-floored hall.

== Produce ==
Fruit orchards represent a significant part of the land usage and history of Ashton. Yearly crops include cherries, apples, lemons and pears as well as many other fruits and vegetables. In addition, Ashton has facilities for the cold storage of produce although today's ease of transport and close proximity to Adelaide has meant they are not as extensively used as in the past.

== Directions ==
Ashton is located on Lobethal Road approximately 20 minutes or 17 kilometres (11 mi) from the Adelaide City Centre. The simplest route from the city is North Terrace, Magill Road, Old Norton Summit Road, Lobethal Road (all of which are continuations of the same road).

== Eastern Rangers Football Club ==
The Eastern Rangers Football Club was formed when the Lenswood Rangers Football Club and Ashton Football Club merged. Known as the "Saints", the club competed in the Hills Football League until the club merged with the neighboring Uraidla Football Club to form the Uraidla Districts Football Club. The Eastern Rangers club had A Grade premiership success in just one season in 1987 in the Hills Football League's First Division. The club then struggled in the leagues first division and moved to the HFL's second division. It reached the second division's grand final in 1995 but lost the game. After talks with the Uraidla football club the club decided to merge creating the Uraidla Districts football club. The new club had A grade premiership success in 2005 and was the front runner in the 2006 and 2007 season but lost the grand final to the Mount Lofty District Football Club.
