= Mannum (disambiguation) =

Mannum is a town in the Australian state of South Australia.

Mannum may also refer to.

- District Council of Mannum, a former local government area in South Australia
- Mannum Waterfalls, a waterfall of Australia
- Mannum Football Club, a South Australian football club
- Mannum Formation, a geological formation in South Australia
- Mannum Rowing Club, an Australian rowing club

== See also ==
- Mannum–Adelaide pipeline
- Adelaide–Mannum Road
- Mannum Mercury and Farmer's Journal
