= Bridgewater-Callington Football Club =

Names
- Full name: Bridgewater-Callington Raiders Football Club Inc
- Former name(s): Bridgewater Football Club, Callington United Football
- Nickname: Raiders
- Former nickname: Eagles (as Callington)

Club details
- Founded: 2013 (merger); 1956 as Bridgewater
- Colours: navy light blue gold white
- Competition: Hills Football League
- Premierships: List: Hills Football Association A2 (1) 1959; Torrens Valley Football Association A2 (1) 1963; Hills Central Association B2 (1) 1966; Hills Football League Division 2 (2) 1981, 2016 | Division 2 Reserves (1) 2017
- Grounds: Bridgewater Oval
- Callington Oval

Uniforms
| Home | Away | Alternate |

Other information
- Official website: bridgewatercallingtonraiders.com

The Bridgewater-Callington Raiders is an Australian rules football club based in the towns of Bridgewater and Callington in South Australia, playing in Division 1 of the Hills Football League.

== History ==
=== Bridgewater Football Club ===
The Bridgewater Football Club was founded in 1956 although football was played in the town back in 1895 when there was a local team that existed right up until the 1940s.

The club was known as the Raiders and had the colours of light blue, royal blue and white and played in three different hills leagues.

Its first seasons were spent in the Hills Football Association (HFA) from 1956 until 1961 when the league disbanded. The club started slowly in its first few years of existence in the HFA but managed to win a senior premiership in 1959.

After the league folded in 1961, Bridgewater spent five years with the Torrens Valley Football Association where it won another senior grade premiership over Eden Valley Rovers in 1953.

In 1967, Bridgewater moved back to the Hills Football League, playing in its Central Zone (now Division 1).

==== A-Grade Premierships ====
- 1959 Hills Football Association vs Bremer 12.13.85 to 1.13.19
- 1963 Torrens Valley Football Association vs Eden Valley 11.7.73 to 8.11.59
- 1966 Hills Central Association vs Mylor 11.8.74 to 10.6.66
- 1981 Hills Football League Division 2
- 1987 Hills Football League Courier Cup
- 2016 Hills Football League Division 2

==== B-Grade Premierships ====
- 1982 Hills Football League Division 1
- 1992 Hills Football League Division 1
- 2020 Hills Football League Division 2

=== Callington United Football Club ===
The Callington United Football Club was founded in 1995 with the colours of navy blue and gold, and going by the nickname 'the Eagles'.

It filled the void of the original Bremer-Callington club which was formed around 1903 as the Bremer Football Club from the 1950s, but merged with and relocated to Nairne in 1978 to form the Nairne Bremer United Football Club.

Callington United played in the Hills Football League Country Division from 2003. The club's 2009 and 2010 seasons were infamous for being among the worst seasons ever, finishing each season winless with percentages below 4.0%, with losses which included conceding seven of the ten highest senior match scores in South Australian history.

=== Post-Merger ===
Both Bridgewater and Callington United finished at the bottom of the Central and Country divisions of the Hills Football League in 2012 and merged in the following off-season to commence the 2013 season as a single entity.

As part of the merger, the club wore the Bridgewater home guernsey (navy blue with white and light blue chevrons), retained the Bridgewater nickname - 'the Raiders' - and split games and training between Bridgewater and Callington ovals.

The club which finished ninth in 2013 and eighth in 2014, before joining the Hills Division 2 for the 2015 season.

Here, the club enjoyed its strong run of sustained success. In 2015 it reached the grand final (losing to Kersbrook) before defeating Nairne Bremer in a three-point thriller to win the 2016 premiership - ending a 35-year premiership drought.

Bridgewater-Callington's B-Grade won the 2017 reserves grand final over Nairne Bremer.

== Women's football ==
Like many clubs, Bridgewater-Callington operates a women's program. The fledgling program commenced in 2018 playing in the sixth division of the Adelaide Footy League women's competition. It finished sixth on the ladder with one win over Murraylands Swans. From 2020 the club will play in the new 'HFLW' competition.

== Location ==
Bridgewater-Callington retains its main clubrooms and training base at Bridgewater Oval in the main Bridgewater township, with training and games taking place at Callington Oval as well. While the Hills Football League historically features a number of clubs that are the result of mergers such as Mt Lofty, Torrens Valley and Uraidla Districts, Bridgewater-Callington remains the only club to split its games between two home grounds.

== Notable players ==
Tim Weatherald was a former player of the Bridgewater Football Club who continued his football journey to play for the Sturt Football Club in the South Australian National Football League and won the 2002 Magarey Medal and the club's Best and Fairest award and played in Sturt's 2002 grand final triumph over Central District, coming out 47-point winners.

- Tom Sparrow (Melbourne)
