= David Welsby =

Australian rules footballer

Personal information
- Full name: David Welsby
- Born: 25 November 1969 (age 56)
- Original teams: Mount Lofty District (HFL); Sturt (SANFL)
- Draft: No. 62, 1988 national draft

Playing career^{1}
| Years | Club | Games (Goals) |
| 1990 | Geelong | 2 (1) |
- ^{1} Playing statistics correct to the end of 1990.

David Welsby (born 25 November 1969) is a former Australian rules footballer who played for Geelong in the Australian Football League (AFL) in 1990. He was recruited from the Sturt Football Club in the South Australian National Football League (SANFL) with the 62nd selection in the 1988 VFL Draft.
