= Mid Murray Football Association =

The Mid Murray Football Association was an Australian rules football competition based in the western Riverland region of South Australia, Australia. It operated for 100 years, from 1910 to 2009. It was an affiliated member of the South Australian National Football League.

== Brief history ==
The Mid-Murray Football Association was formed in 1910 with founding clubs being Kingston, Morgan, and Waikerie.

== Final clubs ==
Club	Jumper	Nickname	Home Ground	Former League	Est.	Years in MMFA	MMFA Senior Premierships		Fate
Club	Jumper	Nickname	Home Ground	Former League	Est.	Years in MMFA	Total	Years	Fate
Blanchetown Swan Reach	(1980s)(1990s)(2000s)	Bulldogs	Blanchetown Oval, Blanchetown and Swan Reach Oval, Swan Reach	–	1972	1972-2009	6	1981, 1982, 1991, 1997, 2002, 2007	Moved to Riverland Independent FL in 2010
Morgan Cadell		Tigers	Morgan Sporting Complex, Morgan and Cadell Recreation Ground, Cadell	–	1995	1995-2009	0	-	Folded when the league finished in 2010
Robertstown	(1980s-90s) (90s-2009)	Kangaroos	Robertstown Oval, Robertstown	B&LFA	1903	1987-2009	10	1987, 1989, 1992, 1999, 2001, 2003, 2004, 2005, 2008, 2009	Merged with Eudunda to form Eudunda Robertstown in 2010 in the North Eastern FL
Sedan Cambrai		Magpies	Cambrai Sports Club, Cambrai	HFL	1922	1985-2009	2	1988, 2000	Returned to Hills FL in 2010

== Previous clubs ==
Club	Jumper	Nickname	Home Ground	Former League	Est.	Years in MMFA	MMFA Senior Premierships		Fate
Club	Jumper	Nickname	Home Ground	Former League	Est.	Years in MMFA	Total	Years	Fate
Blanchetown			Blanchetown Oval, Blanchetown	–	1919	1939-1972	4	1953, 1954, 1961, 1962	Merged with Swan Reach in 1972 to form Blanchetown Swan Reach
Cadell		Bloods	Cadell Recreation Ground, Cadell	–	1933	1939-1994	16	1947, 1948, 1950, 1951, 1952, 1957, 1958, 1959, 1960, 1965, 1971, 1972, 1973, 1974, 1985, 1990	Merged with Morgan to form Morgan Cadell in 1995
Cadell Training Centre				–	1971	1971-1983	1	1980	Absorbed by Cadell in 1984
Imperials			Waikerie Oval, Waikerie	–	1923	1923-1924	0	-	Folded in 1925
Kia Ora			Waikerie Oval, Waikerie	–	1910	1910-1926	7	1914, 1920, 1921, 1922, 1923, 1924, 1925	Folded after 1926 season
Kingston				–	1877	1910-1912	0	-	Moved to Upper Murray FL in 1913
Lock 2				–	1925	1925-1927	1	1927	Folded after 1928 season
Morgan		Eagles	Morgan Sporting Complex, Morgan	–	1909	1910-1994	16	1928, 1934, 1939, 1946, 1955, 1956, 1964, 1966, 1968, 1969, 1970, 1976, 1983, 1984, 1986, 1993	Merged with Cadell in 1995 to form Morgan Cadell
Perponda		Grass Parrots	Perponda Oval, Perponda	MLFL	1928	1994-1999	2	1994, 1998	Folded after 1999 season
Point Pass		Crows	Point Pass Memorial Oval, Point Pass	–	1992	1992	0	-	Folded after 1992 season
Qualco Rovers				–	1911	1911-1912	0	-	Folded after 1913 season
Ramco	(1910-40)(1946-2008)	Roosters	Ramco Sporting Facility, Ramco	–	1909	1910-2008	10	1910, 1935, 1949, 1963, 1977, 1978, 1979, 1995, 1996, 2006	Moved to Riverland Independent FL in 2009
Swan Reach		Swans	Swan Reach Oval, Swan Reach	EMFL	1910	1971	0	-	Merged with Blanchetown in 1972 to form Blanchetown Swan Reach
Taylorville Holder United (Holder 1948-53)			Taylorville Oval, Taylorville	–	1948	1958-1975	2	1967, 1975	Folded after 1975 season
Truro		Rams	Truro Oval, Truro	B&MVFA	1886	1992-1995	0	-	Folded after 1995 season
Waikerie			Waikerie Oval, Waikerie	–	1908	1910-1926	4	1911, 1912, 1913, 1926	Split into Waikerie Districts and Waikerie Ramblers in 1927
Waikerie Districts			Waikerie Oval, Waikerie	–	1927	1927-1928	0	-	Merged with Waikerie Ramblers to form Waikerie in Upper Murray FL in 1929
Waikerie Ramblers			Waikerie Oval, Waikerie	–	1927	1927-1928	0	-	Merged with Waikerie Districts to form Waikerie in Upper Murray FL in 1929
Waikerie Rovers			Waikerie Oval, Waikerie	–	1929	1929-1935	2	1932, 1933	Formed when the Waikerie clubs left in 1929. Folded after 1935 season

== Notable players ==
Mark Ricciuto - Ramco

Adam Cockshell - Perponda

== 2006 Ladder ==
Mid Murray	Wins	Byes	Losses	Draws	For	Against	%	Pts
Ramco	11	0	3	0	1432	934	60.52%	22
Sedan-Cambrai	8	0	5	1	1161	1042	52.70%	17
Robertstown	8	0	6	0	1242	997	55.47%	16
Blanchetown-Swan Reach	6	0	7	1	998	1065	48.38%	13
Morgan-Cadell	1	0	13	0	792	1587	33.29%	2

FINALS

Final	Team	G	B	Pts	Team	G	B	Pts
1st Semi	Robertstown	13	7	85	Blanchetown-Swan Reach	12	8	80
2nd Semi	Ramco	16	10	106	Sedan-Cambrai	5	9	39
Preliminary	Robertstown	17	16	118	Sedan-Cambrai	4	5	29
Grand	Ramco	16	9	105	Robertstown	5	6	36

== 2007 Ladder ==
Mid Murray	Wins	Byes	Losses	Draws	For	Against	%	Pts
Blanchetown-Swan Reach	14	0	0	0	2017	503	80.04%	28
Ramco	10	0	4	0	1262	1104	53.34%	20
Morgan-Cadell	5	0	9	0	1060	1367	43.68%	10
Sedan-Cambrai	5	0	9	0	1032	1413	42.21%	10
Robertstown	1	0	13	0	665	1649	28.74%	2

FINALS

Final	Team	G	B	Pts	Team	G	B	Pts
1st Semi	Morgan-Cadell	16	12	108	Sedan-Cambrai	11	21	87
2nd Semi	Blanchetown-Swan Reach	14	12	96	Ramco	5	9	39
Preliminary	Ramco	16	17	113	Morgan-Cadell	16	8	104
Grand	Blanchetown-Swan Reach	26	13	169	Ramco	7	9	51

== 2008 Ladder ==
Mid Murray	Wins	Byes	Losses	Draws	For	Against	%	Pts
Blanchetown-Swan Reach	12	0	2	0	1511	685	68.81%	24
Robertstown	9	0	4	0	1571	901	63.55%	18
Sedan-Cambrai	7	0	6	0	1092	1172	48.23%	14
Morgan-Cadell	3	0	10	0	1023	1577	39.35%	6
Ramco	2	0	11	0	823	1685	32.81%	4

FINALS

Final	Team	G	B	Pts	Team	G	B	Pts
1st Semi	Sedan-Cambrai	20	9	129	Morgan-Cadell	9	11	65
2nd Semi	Blanchetown-Swan Reach	13	5	83	Robertstown	7	10	52
Preliminary	Robertstown	17	6	108	Sedan-Cambrai	9	13	67
Grand	Robertstown	14	8	92	Blanchetown-Swan Reach	9	8	62

== 2009 Ladder ==
Mid Murray	Wins	Byes	Losses	Draws	For	Against	%	Pts
Blanchetown-Swan Reach	13	0	1	1	2170	664	76.57%	27
Robertstown	9	0	5	1	2049	824	71.32%	19
Sedan-Cambrai	7	0	8	0	1551	1025	60.21%	14
Morgan-Cadell	0	0	15	0	320	3577	8.21%	0

FINALS

Final	Team	G	B	Pts	Team	G	B	Pts
1st Semi	Sedan-Cambrai	37	19	241	Morgan-Cadell	2	4	16
2nd Semi	Blanchetown-Swan Reach	4	8	32	Robertstown	7	11	53
Preliminary	Sedan-Cambrai	11	8	74	Blanchetown-Swan Reach	9	11	65
Grand	Robertstown	15	6	96	Sedan-Cambrai	7	11	53

== Football League to disband ==
From late 2009 to early 2010, Robertstown merged with North Eastern Football League club Eudunda, with the new club competing as the Southern Saints in the NEFL from 2010. This followed the move of Sedan Cambrai to the Hills Football League, leaving the league with only two clubs and deciding to disband. The association issued a press release on its website announcing the league's disbandment.

Blanchetown/Swan Reach were later accepted into the Riverland Independent Football League.

On 19 October 2017, the Mid-Murray Football Association Incorporated was officially deregistered as an incorporated association by the Corporate Affairs Commission.

== Books ==
- Encyclopedia of South Australian country football clubs / compiled by Peter Lines. ISBN 9780980447293
- South Australian country football digest / by Peter Lines ISBN 9780987159199
