= Meadows Football Club =

Australian rules football club

Meadows
- Full name: Meadows Football Club
- Nickname: Bulldogs
- Sport: Australian Rules Football
- Founded: 1903
- League: Hills Football League
- Home ground: Meadows Recreation Ground, Meadows
- Colours: Green, Gold
- President: Dean Whitford
- Head coach: Scott Bailey
- Captain: Max Buckley

The Meadows Football Club is an Australian rules football club first formed in the late 19th century. In 1903, Meadows joined the Hills Football Association, where it participated for just three seasons.

In 1923, Meadows was a founding member of the Hills Central Football Association, playing in that competition until the end of the 1966 season, spending one season in the Hills Football Association along the way (1945), and spending some of the 1960s in the A2 division. During the restructure of Hills football in 1967, Meadows joined the Hills Football League Southern Zone, shifting to Division 3 in 1972, then Division 2 in 1979. In 1983, Meadows joined the Southern Football League Division 2 competition, remaining until the end of the 2000 season when they shifted back to the Hills Football League Division 2 competition.

Meadows continue to field Senior and Junior teams in the Hills Football League Division 2 competition.

== A-Grade Premierships ==
- 1924 Hills Central Football Association A1
- 1949 Hills Central Football Association A1
- 1956 Hills Central Football Association A1
- 1963 Hills Central Football Association A2
- 1967 Hills Football League Southern Zone
- 1984 Southern Football League Division 2
- 1994 Southern Football League Division 2
- 2001 Hills Football League Country Division
- 2002 Hills Football League Country Division
- 2003 Hills Football League Country Division
- 2004 Hills Football League Country Division
