= Sedan Cambrai Football Club =

Sedan Cambrai

Names
- Full name: Sedan Cambrai Football Netball Club
- Nickname(s): Magpies

Club details
- Founded: 1922
- Colours: Black White
- Competition: Riverland Independent Football League
- Premierships: 7 ( 1922, 1923, 1924, 1927, 1966, 1988, 2000, 2019 )
- Ground(s): Sportsground Road Cambrai

The Sedan Cambrai Football Club is an Australian rules football club based in the Murraylands region of South Australia which was initially formed in 1922 as Cambrai Sedan, a merger between the Sedan Football Club and the Cambrai Football Club.

== History ==
The club initially participated in the Murray Ranges Football Association, temporarily shifting for one season (1925) to the Murray River Football Association before returning and in 1930 were renamed to Sedan Cambrai.

In 1936 the club went into recess until after World War II, when in 1947 it reformed and joined the Barossa & Murray Valley Football Association, lasting for four seasons before going into recess again in 1951.

In 1955 the club reformed again and returned to the Barossa & Murray Valley Association. Sedan Cambrai had a short affiliation with the Gawler and District Football Association's AII competition from 1957 to 1958 before shifting to the Torrens Valley Football Association AII competition in 1959. When the TVFA merged into the new Hills Football League in 1967, Sedan Cambrai joined the Northern Division and then were placed in the Division 2 competition when the Hills League was restructured in 1972.

In 1975, Sedan Cambrai merged with the Mount Torrens Football Club to form the Mount Torrens Cambrai Football Club. This merger would only last for ten years before the club split back into Sedan Cambrai and Mount Torrens in 1986. The reformed Sedan Cambrai entered the Mid Murray Football Association and played in that competition until it disbanded at the end of the 2009 season when they returned to the Hills Football League Country Division (Division 2).

In 2015, Sedan Cambrai was voted out of the Hills Football League Division 2 competition by member clubs and were initially pushed into the C-Grade competition. They were reinstated for the 2015 season before shifting to the Riverland Independent Football League in 2016.

== A-Grade Premierships ==
- Murray Ranges Football Association (4)
  - 1922
  - 1923
  - 1924
  - 1927
- Torrens Valley Football Association A2 (1)
  - 1966
- Mid Murray Football Association (2)
  - 1988
  - 2000
- Riverland Independent Football League (1)
  - 2019

== Merger history ==
=== Sedan ===
The Sedan Football Club existed prior to World War I playing challenge matches against nearby towns. They entered one-year temporary mergers with Swan Reach (1910), and Cambrai (1919) before formally combining with Cambrai to form the Cambrai Sedan Football Club in 1922.

=== Cambrai ===
The Cambrai Football Club were originally formed as the Rhine Villa Football Club, before being renamed to Cambrai in 1918. Rhine Villa/Cambrai played challenge matches against local towns before merging with Sedan in 1922 to form the Cambrai Sedan Football Club.

=== Mount Torrens Cambrai ===
The Mount Torrens Cambrai Football Club was formed in 1976 as a merger of the Sedan Cambrai Football Club and the Mount Torrens Football Club. Mount Torrens Cambrai participated in the Hills Football League Division 2 competition until the end of the 1985 season when they split back into Sedan Cambrai and Mount Torrens.

== Books ==
- Encyclopedia of South Australian country football clubs / compiled by Peter Lines. ISBN 9780980447293
- South Australian country football digest / by Peter Lines ISBN 9780987159199
