= Echunga Football Club =

Australian rules football club

Echunga

Names
- Full name: Echunga Football Club
- Nickname: Demons

Club details
- Founded: 1903
- Competition: Hills Football League
- President: Kym Pocock
- Coach: Darren Vanzetta
- Ground: Echunga Oval, Echunga

The Echunga Football Club is an Australian rules football team that plays in the town of Echunga, South Australia, and plays in Division 1 of the Hills Football League.

== Club history ==
The Echunga Football Club was founded in 1903 by gold diggers who introduced the game to the town and played on hallowed turf prior to the club's founding. For twenty years the team played challenge matches against other teams from neighbouring towns until the Hills Central Football Association was founded in 1923. The HCFA lasted until 1967 when the association amalgamated with other neighbouring associations to form the current Hills Football League.

With war suspending the game for five years, the Echunga FC's involvement with a formal league now spans eighty-eight years. The Demons have won sixteen A-Grade premierships with thirty-three grand final appearances. After World War II, the club made eight grand finals and won six premierships.

== Premierships ==
- A-Grade: 1925, 1939, 1945, 1947, 1950, 1951, 1953, 1955, 1971, 1972, 1995, 1996, 2000, 2011, 2013, 2014
- B-Grade: 1968, 1975, 1979, 2000, 2024
- Senior Colts: 1967, 1968, 1970, 1976, 1993
- Junior Colts: 1972, 1992, 2001, 2009
- Mini Colts: 1980
