= Onkaparinga Valley Football Club =

Australian football club

Onkaparinga Valley
- Full name: Onkaparinga Valley Football Club
- Nickname: Bulldogs
- Sport: Australian rules football
- Founded: 1967
- League: Hills Football League
- Home ground: Johnston Memorial Park, Balhannah
- Colours: Red, White, Blue
- Anthem: "We are the Onkas, dinky di"

The Onkaparinga Valley Football Club, nicknamed the Bulldogs, is an Australian rules football club that serves the South Australian towns of Balhannah, Woodside and Oakbank. The Bulldogs currently compete in Division 1 of the Hills Football League and play their home games in Balhannah.

== Club Song ==
Are we plumb, are we pud

Are we any bloody good?

We are the onkas, dinky di.

In any kind of weather

As long as we're together

We'll fight until we die.

You can stick the old uniteds

And all the bloody rest

'cause if you want the champions

then onkas are the best.

Are we plumb are we pud

Are we any bloody good

We are the onkas Dinky di.

== Club history ==
The Onkaparinga Valley Football Club was founded in 1967 at the same time as the amalgamation of the Hills Central Football League and the Torrens Valley Football League to form the current Hills Football League. The Onkaparinga Football Club joined with the Woodside Football Club to form the Onkaparinga Valley Football Club. In 1977 the OVFC became the only club in the HFL to own their headquarters, with the changerooms and lounging area built the following year in 1978. That same year saw the Bulldogs win their first premiership over Heathfield-Aldgate and won their second premiership in 1994. Their 1978 premiership ended Heathfield-Aldgate's hopes of leaving the HFL having won eight consecutive premierships.

The club plays its games in the town of Balhannah but Woodside Oval has always remained the training ground for junior teams. The red, white and blue colours of the former Woodside FC were the chosen colours for the new club with the Bulldog becoming the club nickname and adopted symbol.

The Onkaparinga Valley Bulldogs still continue to field senior and junior teams in Division 1 of the Hills Football League.

== Club premierships ==
- A-Grade: 1978, 1994, 2026
- B-Grade: 1982, 1998, 2013
- C-Grade: 1979 1980, 1981, 1982, 2007
- Senior Colts: 1973, 1983, 1984, 1997, 2000, 2012
- Junior Colts: 1977, 1981, 1989, 1995, 1997

== Merger history ==
Onkaparinga Valley was formed in 1967 through the amalgamation of Woodside Army and Onkaparinga.

=== Woodside Army ===
The Woodside Army Football Club was formed in 1959 through the amalgamation of Woodside and No. 16 Battalion. Initially starting in the Hills Football Association, Woodside Army shifted to the Torrens Valley Football Association in 1960 before merging with Onkaparinga in 1967 to join the newly formed Hills Football League.

A-Grade Premierships

- Torrens Valley Football Association (1)
  - 1964

==== Woodside ====
The Woodside Football Club joined the Hills Football Association briefly in 1902 for two seasons and then returned in 1907. Woodside shifted to the Torrens Valley Football Association in 1925 before going into recess in 1931. The club reformed in 1935, returning to the Torrens Valley Association for one year before shifting to the Mount Lofty Football Association B-Grade competition in 1936. After one season, they were promoted to the Mount Lofty A-Grade competition and then the following season returned to the Hills Football Association where they remained until they merged with No. 16 Battalion to form Woodside Army.

A-Grade Premierships

- Hills Football Association (1)
  - 1907
- Torrens Valley Football Association (1)
  - 1926
- Mount Lofty Football Association B-Grade (1)
  - 1936

==== Number 16 Battalion ====
Number 16 Battalion was an Army team formed in 1953 that joined the Hills Football Association. In 1959 they merged with Woodside to form Woodside Army.

=== Onkaparinga ===
The Onkaparinga Football Club was initially formed in 1902 as the Oakbank Football Club, adopting the Onkaparinga name the following year. Entering recess during World War I, Onkaparinga reformed as part of a temporary merger with the Hahndorf Football Club as the Oakbank Hahndorf Football Club. Onkaparinga reformed in its own right in 1909 competing in the Hills Football Association before shifting to the Torrens Valley Football Association in 1929. In 1934, Onkaparinga made a shift to the Mount Lofty Football Association, dropping to B-Grade in 1936, before returning to A-Grade the following year and then returning to the Hills Football Association in 1938. Onkaparinga joined the Hills Central Football Association in 1962 where it remained until it merged with the Woodside Army Football Club in 1967.

A-Grade Premierships

- Hills Football Association (6)
  - 1908 (as Oakbank Hahndorf)
  - 1909
  - 1913
  - 1914
  - 1951
  - 1961
