= Macclesfield Football Club (Australia) =

Australian rules football club in Macclesfield, Australia

Macclesfield
- Full name: Macclesfield Football Club
- Nickname: Blood & Tars
- Sport: Australian Rules Football
- Founded: 1880
- League: Hills Football League
- Home ground: Macclesfield, Macclesfield
- Colours: Black, Red
- President: Stan Forkert

The Macclesfield Football Club is an Australian rules football club first formed in 1880.

== History ==
In 1923, Macclesfield was a founding member of the Hills Central Football Association, playing in that competition until the end of the 1966 season. As a result of the restructure of Hills football in 1967, Macclesfield joined the Hills Football League Southern Zone, shifting to Division 4 in 1972, Division 3 in 1974 and then Division 2 in 1979. In 1984, Macclesfield joined the Southern Football League Division 2 competition, but only lasted 5 seasons, before shifting back to the Hills Football League Division 2 competition in 1989.

Macclesfield continue to field Senior and Junior teams in the Hills Football League Division 2 competition.

== A-Grade Premierships ==
- 1929 Hills Central Football Association A1
- 1948 Hills Central Football Association A1
- 1958 Hills Central Football Association A2
- 1959 Hills Central Football Association A2
- 1969 Hills Football League Southern Zone
- 1972 Hills Football League Division 4
- 1973 Hills Football League Division 4
- 1980 Hills Football League Division 2
- 2025 Hills Football League Division 2
- 2026 Hills Football League Division 2
