= West Augusta Football Club =

West Augusta
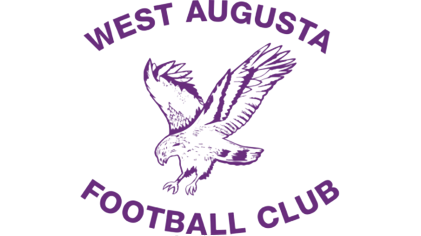

Names
- Full name: West Augusta Football Club
- Nickname(s): Westies; Hawks

2026 season
- After finals: 5th (A Grade); 5th (B Grade); 1st (U 18s)
- Home-and-away season: 5th (A Grade); 5th (B Grade); 2nd (U 18s)
- Best and fairest: Kym Lebois (A Grade); Richard Hobbs (B Grade); Oliver Waterman (U 18s)

Club details
- Founded: 3 April 1915
- Colours: Purple & White
- Competition: Spencer Gulf Football League
- President: Drew Harrison
- Coach: A Grade: Phillip Graham; B Grade: TBC; U-18s: Max Edwards
- Captain(s): A Grade: Jamahl McKenzie; B Grade: TBC; U-18S: TBC
- Premierships: A Grade (12): 1969; 1972; 1973; 1974; 1975; 1976; 1985; 1987; 1989; 1996; 2005; 2013
- Ground: Chinnery Park; Central Oval
- Training ground: Chinnery Park; Central Oval

Uniforms
Home & Away	ANZAC

Other information
- Official website: westaugustafc.com

The West Augusta Football Club, nicknamed the Hawks, is an amateur Australian rules football club based in Port Augusta West, South Australia that was founded in 1915. The West Augusta have fielded a men's team in the Spencer Gulf Football League (SGL) since 1961. The club's offices and training facilities are located in the suburb of Port Augusta West, South Australia. Since 1915, West Augusta have played home matches at Chinnery Park, a medium-sized stadium located on the west side of Port Augusta.

The West Augusta Football Club were formed in 1915 as a local team representing Port Augusta in the Spencer Gulf Football League. They played their first season in 1915. The men's team have won 12 grand finals in the Spencer Gulf Football League (SGL), and prior to joining the SGL, they won 9 premierships (1920, 1924, 1927, 1932, 1933, 1934, 1944, 1949, 1956), giving them a total of 21 grand final victories in their 112-year history.

The men's team is currently coached by Phillip Graham and is captained by Jamahl McKenzie.

== Madigan Medalists ==
- J.Martin - 1962
- K.McSporran - 1974, 1975, 1976, 1985
- B. Fazulla - 1996, 1998
- N. Collins - 2015

== Jumper ==
The West Augusta Football Club adopted the purple and white colours for its uniform and was admitted to the Port Augusta Football Association on 3 April 1915 .

The choice of purple and white as the club's colours was initially suggested by West Side school teacher Mr. Sydney Mills, a Christian Brothers Old Collegian, who prevailed upon those present at the first meeting to adopt the colours of his old school in Adelaide.
