= Murray Valley Football Netball League =

- Sport: Australian rules football Netball
- Founded: 2023; 3 years ago
- No. of teams: 7
- Country: Australia
- Confederation: SANFL Community Football
- Website: mvfnl.com

The Murray Valley Football Netball League (MVFNL) is an Australian rules football League located in South Australia's Riverland region. The league features clubs from the smaller towns of the Riverland and Upper Murray region.

The league was born out of the ashes of the Riverland Independent Football League, which, after disassociating from the Riverland Football League following the conclusion of the 2022 season, combined with the Riverland Independent Netball Association to create a new administration and competition.

== History ==
The origins of this league came in 1909 when Lyrup, Renmark Town and Fairview Rovers founded the Murray Football Association. Lyrup won the first ever premiership.

The competition reformed in 1919 as the Upper Murray Football Association and in 1923 split into A and B grade competitions. In 1952, the Association became the Upper Murray Football League (UMFL), not to be confused with the league of the same name located around Corryong, Victoria.

In 1971, the league's B Grade division split out into its own competition as the Riverland Independent B-Grade Football Association. It was renamed the Riverland Independent Football League (RIFL) the following season, while the UMFL underwent its own renaming to the Riverland Football League.

Ramco joined the RIFL in 2009 from the Mid Murray Football Association (MMFA), as did Blanchetown/Swan Reach in 2010, and the MMFA disbanded.

At the conclusion of the 2022 season, the Mallee Football League disbanded and Murrayville applied for admittance to the new MVFNL competition.

== Clubs ==
=== Murray Valley FNL (2023–) ===
==== Locations ====
Locations of the Murray Valley FNL clubs

==== Current clubs ====
Club	Jumper	Nickname	Home Ground	Former League	Est.	Years in MVFNL	MVFNL Premierships	
Club	Jumper	Nickname	Home Ground	Former League	Est.	Years in MVFNL	Total	Years
Browns Well		Bombers	Paruna Oval, Paruna	RIFL	1969	2023–	1	2026
Murrayville		Blues	Murrayville Oval, Murrayville	MFL	1960	2023–	2	2024, 2025
Paringa		Swans	Paringa Oval, Paringa	RIFL	1961	2023–	0	–
Sedan-Cambrai		Magpies	Cambrai Sports Club, Cambrai	RIFL	1922	2023–	1	2023
Ramco		Roosters	Ramco Sporting Facility, Ramco	RIFL	1909	2023–	0	–
Wunkar		Bulldogs	Wunkar Oval, Wunkar	RIFL	1971	2023–	0	–

==== In recess for 2026 ====
Club	Jumper	Nickname	Home Ground	Former League	Est.	Years in MVFNL	MVFNL Premierships	
Club	Jumper	Nickname	Home Ground	Former League	Est.	Years in MVFNL	Total	Years
Blanchetown-Swan Reach		Redbacks	Blanchetown Oval, Blanchetown and Swan Reach Oval, Swan Reach	RIFL	1972	2023–2025	0	–

=== Riverland Independent FL (1971–2022) ===
==== Final clubs ====
Club	Jumper	Nickname	Home Ground	Former League	Est.	Years in RIFL	RIFL Premierships	
Club	Jumper	Nickname	Home Ground	Former League	Est.	Years in RIFL	Total	Years
Blanchetown-Swan Reach		Redbacks	Blanchetown Oval, Blanchetown and Swan Reach Oval, Swan Reach	MMFA	1972	2010–2014, 2016–2022	2	2012, 2022
Browns Well		Bombers	Paruna Oval, Paruna	UMFL	1969	1971–2022	10	1972, 1975, 1978, 1982, 1985, 1986, 1988, 2000, 2016, 2017
Paringa		Swans	Paringa Oval, Paringa	UMFL	1961	1971–2022	8	1979, 1995, 1997, 2002, 2005, 2009, 2013, 2018
Sedan-Cambrai		Magpies	Cambrai Sports Club, Cambrai	HFL	1922	2016–2022	1	2019
Ramco		Roosters	Ramco Sporting Facility, Ramco	MMFA	1909	2009–2022	1	2021
Wunkar	(1971-79)(1980-2017)(2018-23)	Bulldogs	Wunkar Oval, Wunkar	–	1971	1971–2022	2	1974, 1976

==== Former clubs ====
Club	Jumper	Nickname	Home Ground	Former League	Est.	Years in RIFL	RIFL Premierships		Fate
Club	Jumper	Nickname	Home Ground	Former League	Est.	Years in RIFL	Total	Years	Fate
Browns Well 2		Bombers	Paruna Oval, Paruna	UMFL	1969	1971–1976	0	-	Browns Well only fielded one side after 1976 season
Chaffey		Blues		UMFL	1922	1971–1973	0	-	Folded after 1973 season
Cobdogla	(1971-?)(?-2021)	Eagles	Cobdogla Oval, Cobdogla	UMFL	1919	1971–2021	11	1981, 1984, 1987, 1989, 1990, 1991, 1998, 1999, 2006, 2007, 2008	Folded after 2021 season
East Murray	(1994-2001)(2002-14)	Tigers	East Murray Community Complex, Mindarie	MLFL	1971	1994–2014	1	2003	Folded after 2014 season
Gerard	(1971-?) (?-1989)	Hawks	Gerard Mission Oval, Gerard and Glossop High School, Glossop	UMFL	1948	1971–1972, 1974–1984, 1987–1989	0	-	Folded after 1989 season
Lyrup	(1971-87)(1988-?(?-2021)	Lions	Lyrup Sporting Complex, Lyrup	UMFL	1909	1971–2013, 2014–2021	8	1973, 1980, 1996, 2001, 2004, 2010, 2011, 2015	Folded after 2022 season
Moorook-Kingston	(1971-80s)(1990s)(2000s)(2010s)	Warriors	Moorook Oval, Moorook	UMFL	1963	1971–2016	7	1971, 1977, 1983, 1992, 1993, 1994, 2014	Folded after 2017 season
Renmark-Chaffey		Rovers	Renmark Oval, Renmark	–	1981	1981–1985	0	-	Folded after 1985 season
Riverland United		Saints	Gerard Mission Oval, Gerard	–	1997	1997–2001, 2003	0	-	Suspended mid-season 2001, returned in 2003 but folded after the season

== 2022 Ladder ==
Riverland Independent	Wins	Byes	Losses	Draws	For	Against	%	Pts	Final	Team	G	B	Pts	Team	G	B	Pts
Blanchetown/Swan Reach	15	0	0	0	1419	596	70.42%	30	1st Semi	Wunkar	9	13	67	Browns Well	9	8	62
Sedan Cambrai	11	0	3	0	1475	822	64.21%	22	2nd Semi	Sedan Cambrai	13	5	83	Blanchetown/Swan Reach	10	2	62
Wunkar	8	0	7	0	1050	952	52.45%	16	Preliminary	Blanchetown/Swan Reach	16	13	109	Wunkar	6	10	46
Browns Well	4	0	9	0	884	1136	43.76%	8	Grand	Blanchetown/Swan Reach	10	7	67	Sedan Cambrai	8	6	54
Ramco	3	0	11	0	794	1389	36.37%	6									
Paringa	2	0	13	0	721	1448	33.24%	4									

== 2023 Ladder ==
Murray Valley	Wins	Byes	Losses	Draws	For	Against	%	Pts	Final	Team	G	B	Pts	Team	G	B	Pts
Sedan Cambrai	12	0	0	0	1540	331	82.31%	24	1st Semi	Murrayville	12	8	80	Ramco	15	9	99
Browns Well	8	0	4	0	1095	626	63.63%	16	2nd Semi	Sedan Cambrai	21	11	137	Browns Well	6	10	46
Murrayville	8	0	4	0	936	817	53.39%	16	Preliminary	Browns Well	14	11	95	Ramco	8	5	53
Ramco	6	0	6	0	640	933	40.69%	12	Grand	Sedan Cambrai	13	13	91	Browns Well	8	5	53
Blanchetown/Swan Reach	3	0	9	0	518	836	38.26%	6									
Wunkar	3	0	9	0	643	1090	37.10%	6									
Paringa	2	0	10	0	416	1155	26.48%	4									

== 2024 Ladder ==
Murray Valley	Wins	Byes	Losses	Draws	For	Against	%	Pts	Final	Team	G	B	Pts	Team	G	B	Pts
Blanchetown/Swan Reach	13	0	1	0	1087	709	60.52%	26	1st Semi	Browns Well	8	6	54	Wunkar	4	6	30
Murrayville	9	0	5	0	1211	735	62.23%	18	2nd Semi	Murrayville	16	11	107	Blanchetown/Swan Reach	12	5	77
Browns Well	9	0	5	0	1075	665	61.78%	18	Preliminary	Browns Well	12	14	86	Blanchetown/Swan Reach	6	6	42
Wunkar	6	0	8	0	850	932	47.70%	12	Grand	Murrayville	22	10	142	Browns Well	9	6	60
Ramco	5	0	9	0	852	995	46.13%	10									
Sedan Cambrai	4	0	10	0	756	1101	40.71%	8									
Paringa	3	0	11	0	511	1205	29.78%	6									

== Notable players ==
- Sam Durdin East Murray
- Aaron Francis East Murray
- Anthony Lehmann Browns Well

== Premiers ==
=== Riverland Independent FL (1971–2022) ===
- 1971 Moorook-Kingston 11 14 80 Def Browns Well 10 16 76
- 1972 Browns Well 11 12 78 Def Paringa 7 10 52
- 1973 Lyrup 15 13 103 Def Moorook-Kingston 11 9 75
- 1974 Wunkar 10 13 73 Def Browns Well 8 14 62
- 1975 Browns Well 11 7 73 Def Wunkar 9 17 71
- 1976 Wunkar 13 13 91 Def Moorook-Kingston 9 10 64
- 1977 Moorook-Kingston 18 11 119 Def Wunkar 9 13 67
- 1978 Browns Well 13 7 85 Def Wunkar 11 8 74
- 1979 Paringa 16 15 111 Def Gerard 9 13 67
- 1980 Lyrup 11 12 78 Def Paringa 10 14 74
- 1981 Cobdogla 14 17 101 Def Paringa 5 17 47
- 1982 Browns Well 13 11 89 Def Paringa 10 15 75
- 1983 Moorook-Kingston 14 7 91 Def Browns Well 10 10 70
- 1984 Cobdogla 14 18 102 Def Browns Well 9 11 65
- 1985 Browns Well 25 18 168 Def Cobdogla 6 4 40
- 1986 Browns Well 22 9 141 Def Paringa 11 6 72
- 1987 Cobdogla 18 14 122 Def Paringa 8 13 61
- 1988 Browns Well 7 10 52 Def Paringa 6 7 43
- 1989 Cobdogla 9 12 66 Def Browns Well 7 10 52
- 1990 Browns Well 13 10 88 Def Cobdogla 12 15 87
- 1991 Cobdogla 12 14 86 Def Wunkar 8 4 52
- 1992 Moorook-Kingston 15 10 100 Def Cobdogla 14 15 99
- 1993 Moorook-Kingston 21 18 144 Def Lyrup 14 12 96
- 1994 Moorook-Kingston 13 10 88 Def East Murray 13 9 87
- 1995 Paringa 11 14 80 Def Browns Well 7 16 58
- 1996 Lyrup 18 13 121 Def Paringa 11 15 81
- 1997 Paringa 26 20 176 Def Browns Well 10 13 73
- 1998 Cobdogla 21 16 142 Def Wunkar 9 10 64
- 1999 Cobdogla 17 9 111 Def East Murray 16 8 104
- 2000 Browns Well 10 15 75 Def Wunkar 8 5 53
- 2001 Lyrup 7 9 51 Def Cobdogla 7 8 50
- 2002 Paringa 12 11 83 Def Lyrup 6 7 43
- 2003 East Murray 18 7 115 Def Moorook-Kingston 10 4 64
- 2004 Lyrup 18 10 118 Def Moorook-Kingston 9 6 60
- 2005 Paringa 14 15 9 Def Cobdogla 12 12 84
- 2006 Cobdogla 13 16 94 Def Paringa 5 8 38
- 2007 Cobdogla 18 16 124 Def Lyrup 12 11 83
- 2008 Cobdogla 18 14 122 Def Lyrup 5 7 37
- 2009 Paringa 18 14 122 Def Wunkar 17 12 114
- 2010 Lyrup 13 9 87 Def East Murray 7 17 59
- 2011 Lyrup 13 5 83 Def Paringa 8 4 52
- 2012 Blanchetown/SR 16 11 107 Def Ramco 6 8 44
- 2013 Paringa 19 13 127 Def Blanchetown/SR 19 10 124
- 2014 Moorook-Kingston 12 11 83 Def Blanchetown/SR 8 9 57
- 2015 Lyrup 15 16 106 Def Browns Well 11 14 80
- 2016 Browns Well 19 8 122 Def Ramco 8 5 53
- 2017 Browns Well 10 8 68 Def Paringa 5 9 39
- 2018 Paringa 9 8 62 Def Sedan-Cambrai 8 12 60
- 2019 Sedan-Cambrai 17 6 108 Def Paringa 6 10 46
- 2021 Ramco 6 7 43 Def Sedan-Cambrai 4 10 34
- 2022 Blanchetown/SR 10 8 68 Def Sedan-Cambrai 8 6 54

=== Murray Valley FNL (2023–) ===
- 2023 Sedan-Cambrai 13 13 91 Def Browns Well 8 5 53
- 2024 Murrayville 22 10 142 Def Browns Well 9 6 60
- 2025 Murrayville 12 11 83 Def Wunkar 5 11 41
- 2026 Browns Well 5 6 36 Def Paringa 4 11 35

== Books ==
- Encyclopedia of South Australian country football clubs / compiled by Peter Lines. ISBN 9780980447293
- South Australian country football digest / by Peter Lines ISBN 9780987159199
