= Hills Football League =

Australian rules football league

- Current season, competition or edition: 2026
- Sport: Australian Rules Football
- Founded: 1967
- First season: 1967
- President: Travis Lynn
- No. of teams: 18
- Country: Australia
- Region: Adelaide Hills
- Current premiers: Onkaparinga Valley (Division 1 2026), Macclesfield (Country 2026)
- Most premierships: Hahndorf (14)
- Sponsor: Worklocker
- Website: https://www.hillsfootballleague.com.au/

The Hills Football League (HFL) is an Australian rules football league, situated in the Adelaide Hills region of South Australia, to the south east of the state capital Adelaide.

The League has over 3000 players belonging to 18 member Clubs. The League's Clubs are divided into two playing Divisions:

- Division 1 (Formerly Central Division – mostly the larger towns in the Hills region);
- Division 2 (Formerly Country Division – the remaining clubs in the region).

Both divisions have their own programs for the season. There is a promotion and relegation system that received criticism in 2014 following the ultimately unsuccessful decision to relegate Echunga in the same season that they won the Central Division premiership. It is the second biggest league in South Australia after the South Australian Amateur Football League.

In 2009 the Uraidla Districts Football Club became the first team in HFL history to secure all senior premierships (A, B & C) in a single season a feat that was followed by Hahndorf in 2016.

== History ==
The Hills FL was formed in 1967 as a result of the merger of the original Hills Central FL and the Torrens Valley FL. For a number of years, the competition consisted of three divisions, firstly known as the Central Zone, the Northern Zone and the Southern Zone. This later changed to Zone 1, 2 and 3 with two years also providing a Zone 4. Eventually in 1979 the two divisions that exist today was established. The one year that was an exception was 1983 when competition was played in one division.

Heathfield-Aldgate United hold the record for the most premierships won in succession from 1971 to 1977.

== Hills Football Association ==
=== 1902 ===
The Hills Football Association (HFA) was formed. Founding clubs were:

- Mount Barker
- Mylor
- Oakbank
- Woodside

Grand Final: Woodside defeated Mount Barker.

=== 1903–1915 ===
Participating clubs included Mount Barker until the outbreak of World War I.

=== 1916–1918 ===
The HFA was in recess during World War I.

=== 1919 ===
The HFA reformed. Participating clubs were:

- Mount Barker
- Onkaparinga
- Stirling
- Strathalbyn
- Woodside

=== 1920–1928 ===
Participating clubs included Mount Barker.

=== 1929 ===
Participating clubs were:

- Milang
- Mount Barker
- Rovers (minor premiers)
- Strathalbyn

Semi-final: Murray Bridge Rovers 8.11 (59) defeated Strathalbyn 8.5 (53) at Mount Barker.

=== 1930–1937 ===
The HFA was in recess.

=== 1938–1940 ===
The HFA resumed operations.

=== 1941–1944 ===
The HFA was in recess due to World War II.

=== 1945 ===
The HFA resumed competition. Participating clubs were:

- Aldgate (this season only)
- Echunga (this season only)
- Meadows (this season only)
- Mount Barker
- Woodside

Echunga won the premiership.

=== 1946–1947 ===
Participating clubs included:

- Hahndorf
- Mount Barker
- Woodside

=== 1948 ===
Participating clubs included:

- Hahndorf
- Mount Barker
- Woodside

Mount Barker won the premiership.

=== 1949 ===
Participating clubs included:

- Ashton
- Hahndorf
- Mount Barker
- Woodside

Ashton won the premiership.

=== 1950 ===
Participating clubs included:

- Hahndorf
- Mount Barker
- Woodside

=== 1951 ===
Participating clubs included:

- Hahndorf
- Mount Barker
- Onkaparinga
- Woodside

Onkaparinga won the premiership.

=== 1952 ===
Participating clubs included:

- Hahndorf
- Mount Barker
- Woodside

=== 1953 ===
Participating clubs included:

- Hahndorf
- Mount Barker (final season)
- Woodside

=== 1954 ===
Participating clubs included:

- Hahndorf
- Woodside

=== 1955 ===
Participating clubs included:

- Hahndorf (final season)
- Woodside

=== 1956–1958 ===
Participating clubs included Woodside.

=== 1959 ===
Participating clubs included Woodside in its final season.

=== 1961 ===
Participating clubs included:

- Bridgewater (this season only)
- Heathfield
- Nairne
- Onkaparinga
- Stirling
- Uraidla

Onkaparinga won the premiership.

=== 1962 ===
The Hills Football Association folded.

== Clubs ==
=== Grades ===
The HFL consists of:

- Junior Grades
  - Under 14's (mini colts)
  - Under 16's (junior colts)
  - Under 18's (senior colts)
- Senior Grades
  - A Grade (A1)
  - B Grade (A2)
  - C Grade (A3)

=== Locations ===
Colours indicate club's highest level of competition
Red = Division 1
Yellow = Division 2
Blue = C-grade

=== Division 1 ===
Club	Jumper	Nickname	Home Ground	Former League	Est	Years in HFL	HFL Senior Premierships	
Club	Jumper	Nickname	Home Ground	Former League	Est	Years in HFL	Total	Years
Blackwood		Woods	Blackwood Hill Reserve, Blackwood	SMFL	1912	1987-	3	Div 1: 1988, 1991, 2017
Hahndorf		Magpies	Hahndorf Oval, Hahndorf	HCFA	1887	1967-	13	Div 1: 1984, 1985, 1992, 1993, 1995, 1997, 2001, 2015, 2016, 2018, 2019, 2020, 2021, 2024
Lobethal		Tigers	Lobethal Recreation Ground, Lobethal	TVFA	1901	1967-	5	Div 1: 1981, 1998, 1999, 2002, 2022
Mount Barker		Barkeroos	Hanson Oval, Mount Barker	HCFA	1881	1967-	8	Div 1: 1969, 1970, 1982, 1983, 2000, 2003, 2004, 2012
Mount Lofty District		Mountain Devils	Heathfield Oval, Heathfield	SAFA	1978	1986-	6	Div 1: 1986, 1990, 2006, 2007, 2008; Div 2: 2014
Nairne Bremer United		Rams	Nairne Oval, Nairne	–	1978	1978-1991, 1998-	5	Div 1: 2023, 2025; Div 2: 1985, 1989, 2017
Onkaparinga Valley		Onkas, Bulldogs	Johnston Memorial Park, Balhannah	–	1967	1967-	3	Div 1: 1978, 1994, 2026
Uraidla Districts		Demons	Uraidla Showgrounds, Uraidla	–	1997	1997-	5	Div 1: 2005, 2009, 2010, 2011, 2013

=== Division 2 ===
Club	Jumper	Nickname	Home Ground	Former League	Est	Years in HFL	HFL Senior Premierships	
Club	Jumper	Nickname	Home Ground	Former League	Est	Years in HFL	Total	Years
Birdwood		Roosters	Birdwood Oval, Birdwood	TVFA	1880s	1967-	6	Div 2: 1973, 1975, 1976, 1977, 1992, 1994
Bridgewater (Bridgewater-Callington 2013-25)		Raiders	Bridgewater Oval, Bridgewater	–	2012	2013-2022, 2024-	2	Div 2: 1981, 2016
Echunga		Demons	Echunga Recreation Ground, Echunga	HCFA	1903	1967-	7	Div 1: 2014; Div 2: 1995, 1996, 2000, 2011, 2013; Div 3: 1972
Gumeracha		Magpies	Gumeracha Oval, Gumeracha	TVFA	1887	1967-	7	Div 2: 1970, 1982, 1984, 2019, 2022, 2023, 2024
Kangarilla		Double Blues	Kangarilla Recreation Ground, Kangarilla	HCFA, SFL	1901	1967-1978, 2006-	5	Div 2: 2006; Div 3: 1970, 1973, 1974, 1978
Kersbrook		Blues, Brookers	Kersbrook Soldiers Memorial Park, Kersbrook	ETFA	1912	1971-	10	Div 2: 1972, 1974, 1986, 1993, 1997, 2008, 2009, 2012, 2015, 2021
Macclesfield		Blood and Tars	Macclesfield Oval, Macclesfield	HCFA, SFL	1880	1967-1983, 1987-	6	Div 2: 1980, 2025, 2026; Div 3: 1969; Div 4: 1972, 1973
Meadows		Bulldogs	Stringybark Park, Meadows	HCFA, SFL	1903	1967-1982, 2001-	5	Div 2: 2001, 2002, 2003, 2004; Div 3: 1967
Torrens Valley		Mountain Lions	Centenary Park, Mount Torrens	–	1997	1997-	3	Div 2: 2005, 2007, 2010

=== C-Grade Only ===
Club	Jumper	Nickname	Home Ground	Former League	Est	Years in HFL	HFL Senior Premierships	
Club	Jumper	Nickname	Home Ground	Former League	Est	Years in HFL	Total	Years
Milang		Panthers	Milang Oval, Milang	HCFA, GSFL	1881	1967-1978, 1986-2005, 2010-2017, 2021-	1	Div 3: 1989

=== Former clubs ===
Club	Jumper	Nickname	Home Ground	Former League	Est	Years in HFL	HFL Senior Premierships		Fate
Club	Jumper	Nickname	Home Ground	Former League	Est	Years in HFL	Total	Years	Fate
Ashton		Saints	Ashton Oval, Ashton	NNFA	1907	1972-1982	0	-	Merged with Lenswood Rangers to form Eastern Rangers in 1983
Barossa District		Bulldogs	Williamstown Oval, Williamstown	G&DFL	1979	1987-1990	3	Div 2: 1987, 1988, 1990	Moved to Barossa, Light & Gawler FA in 1991
Bremer			Callington Oval, Callington	RMFL	1931	1967-1978	0	-	Merged with Nairne to form Nairne Bremer United in 1978
Bridgewater		Raiders	Bridgewater Oval, Bridgewater	TVFA	1956	1967-2012	1	Div 2: 1981	Merged with Callington United Eagles to form Bridgewater Callington in 2012
Callington United Eagles		Eagles	Callington Oval, Callington	–	1995	1995-2012	0	-	Merged with Bridgewater to form Bridgewater Callington in 2012
Eastern Rangers		Saints	Ashton Oval, Ashton	–	1983	1983-1996	1	Div 1: 1987	Merged with Uraidla to form Uraidla Districts in 1997
Heathfield Aldgate United		United, Red and Greens	Heathfield Oval, Heathfield	–	1967	1967-1978	9	Div 1: 1967, 1968, 1971, 1972, 1973, 1974, 1975, 1976, 1977	Merged with Stirling to form Mount Lofty District in 1978
Ironbank Cherry Gardens		Thunderers	Cherry Gardens Ironbank Recreation Ground, Cherry Gardens	–	1986	1986-2022	4	Div 2: 1998, 1999, 2018, 2020	Merged with Bridgewater-Callington in 2023. Split from merger and moved to Southern FL in 2024
Ironbank-Bridgewater-Cherry Gardens		Ironraiders	Bridgewater Oval, Bridgewater and Cherry Gardens Ironbank Recreation Ground, Cherry Gardens	–	2023	2023	0	-	De-merged into Bridgewater-Callington and Ironbank-Cherry Gardens in 2024
Langhorne Creek		Tigers	Langhorne Creek Oval, Langhorne Creek	HCFA	1906	1967-1977	3	Div 3: 1975, 1976, 1977	Moved to Great Southern FL in 1977
Lenswood Rangers		Rangers	Lenswood Memorial Park, Lenswood	–	1967	1967-1982	2	Div 2: 1978, 1979	Merged with Ashton to form Eastern Rangers in 1983
Littlehampton		Sky Blues	Dunn Park Oval, Mount Barker	HCFA	1959	1967-1972	1	Southern: 1968	Folded after 1972 season
Mount Torrens		Bombers	Centenary Park, Mount Torrens	TVFA	1930	1967-1975, 1986-1996	1	Div 2: 1991	Merged with Sedan Cambrai in 1976 to form Mount Torrens-Cambrai. Merged with Pleasant Valley in 1997 to form Torrens Valley
Mount Torrens-Cambrai				HCFA	1976	1976-1985	0	-	De-merged into Mount Torrens and Sedan Cambrai in 1986
Murraylands Swans		Swans	LeMessurier Oval, Murray Bridge	AdFL	2016	2019-2022	0	-	Folded after 2022 season
Mylor		Magpies	Mylor Oval, Mylor	HCFA	1902	1967-1972	0	-	Folded after 1972 season
Nairne		Rams	Nairne Oval, Nairne	HCFA	1903	1967-1978	0	-	Merged with Bremer to form Nairne Bremer United in 1978
Palmer		Bloods	Collier Park, Palmer	TVFA	1891	1967-1970, 1972-1973	1	Div 4B: 1972	Folded after 1973 season
Pleasant Valley		Roos	Talunga Park, Mount Pleasant	TVFA	1960s	1967-1996	4	Northern: 1967, 1968, 1969, 1971	Merged with Mount Torrens in 1997 to form Torrens Valley
Sedan Cambrai		Magpies	Cambrai Sportsground, Cambrai	TVFA	1922	1967-1975, 2010-2015	0	-	Merged with Mount Torrens in 1976 to form Mount Torrens-Cambrai Moved to Mid Murray FA in 1987. Moved to Riverland Independent FL in 2016
Stirling		Eagles	Stirling Oval, Stirling	TVFA	1800s	1967-1978	0	-	Merged with Heathfield-Aldgate United to form Mount Lofty District in 1978
Uraidla		Redlegs	Uraidla Showgrounds, Uraidla	TVFA	1905	1967-1996	4	Div 1: 1979, 1980, 1989, 1996	Merged with Eastern Rangers to form Uraidla Districts in 1997
Williamstown		Rovers	Williamstown Oval, Williamstown	TVFA	1907	1967-1973	0	-	Moved to Gawler & District FL in 1974

== Premierships ==
Year	Division 1	Country Division/Division 2	Division 3	Division 4
2026	Onkaparinga Valley	Macclesfield	2 divisions (1984-)	
2025	Nairne Bremer	Macclesfield	2 divisions (1984-)	
2024	Hahndorf	Gumeracha	2 divisions (1984-)	
2023	Nairne Bremer	Gumeracha	2 divisions (1984-)	
2022	Lobethal	Gumeracha	2 divisions (1984-)	
2021	Hahndorf	Kersbrook	2 divisions (1984-)	
2020	Hahndorf	Ironbank-Cherry Gardens	2 divisions (1984-)	
2019	Hahndorf	Gumeracha	2 divisions (1984-)	
2018	Hahndorf	Ironbank-Cherry Gardens	2 divisions (1984-)	
2017	Blackwood	Nairne Bremer	2 divisions (1984-)	
2016	Hahndorf	Bridgewater-Callington	2 divisions (1984-)	
2015	Hahndorf	Kersbrook	2 divisions (1984-)	
2014	Echunga	Mount Lofty	2 divisions (1984-)	
2013	Uraidla Districts	Echunga	2 divisions (1984-)	
2012	Mount Barker	Kersbrook	2 divisions (1984-)	
2011	Uraidla Districts	Echunga	2 divisions (1984-)	
2010	Uraidla Districts	Torrens Valley	2 divisions (1984-)	
2009	Uraidla Districts	Kersbrook	2 divisions (1984-)	
2008	Mount Lofty	Kersbrook	2 divisions (1984-)	
2007	Mount Lofty	Torrens Valley	2 divisions (1984-)	
2006	Mount Lofty	Kangarilla	2 divisions (1984-)	
2005	Uraidla Districts	Torrens Valley	2 divisions (1984-)	
2004	Mount Barker	Meadows	2 divisions (1984-)	
2003	Mount Barker	Meadows	2 divisions (1984-)	
2002	Lobethal	Meadows	2 divisions (1984-)	
2001	Hahndorf	Meadows	2 divisions (1984-)	
2000	Mount Barker	Echunga	2 divisions (1984-)	
1999	Lobethal	Ironbank	2 divisions (1984-)	
1998	Lobethal	Ironbank	2 divisions (1984-)	
1997	Hahndorf	Kersbrook	2 divisions (1984-)	
1996	Uraidla	Echunga	2 divisions (1984-)	
1995	Hahndorf	Echunga	2 divisions (1984-)	
1994	Onkaparinga Valley	Birdwood	2 divisions (1984-)	
1993	Hahndorf	Kersbrook	2 divisions (1984-)	
1992	Hahndorf	Birdwood	2 divisions (1984-)	
1991	Blackwood	Mount Torrens	2 divisions (1984-)	
1990	Mount Lofty	Barossa District	2 divisions (1984-)	
1989	Uraidla	Nairne Bremer	2 divisions (1984-)	
1988	Blackwood	Barossa District	2 divisions (1984-)	
1987	Eastern Rangers	Barossa District	2 divisions (1984-)	
1986	Mount Lofty	Kersbrook	2 divisions (1984-)	
1985	Hahndorf	Nairne Bremer	2 divisions (1984-)	
1984	Hahndorf	Gumeracha	2 divisions (1984-)	
1983	Mount Barker	1 division (1983)		
1982	Mount Barker	Gumeracha	2 divisions (1978–1982)	
1981	Lobethal	Bridgewater	2 divisions (1978–1982)	
1980	Uraidla	Macclesfield	2 divisions (1978–1982)	
1979	Uraidla	Lenswood Rangers	2 divisions (1978–1982)	
1978	Onkaparinga Valley	Lenswood Rangers	Kangarilla	3 divisions (1974–1977)
1977	Heathfield-Aldgate	Birdwood	Langhorne Creek	3 divisions (1974–1977)
1976	Heathfield-Aldgate	Birdwood	Langhorne Creek	3 divisions (1974–1977)
1975	Heathfield-Aldgate	Birdwood	Langhorne Creek	3 divisions (1974–1977)
1974	Heathfield-Aldgate	Kersbrook	Kangarilla	3 divisions (1974–1977)
1973	Heathfield-Aldgate	Birdwood	Kangarilla	Macclesfield
1972	Heathfield-Aldgate	Kersbrook	Echunga	Macclesfield
	Central Zone	Northern Zone	Southern Zone	3 divisions (1967–1971)
1971	Heathfield-Aldgate	Pleasant Valley	Echunga	3 divisions (1967–1971)
1970	Mount Barker	Gumeracha	Kangarilla	3 divisions (1967–1971)
1969	Mount Barker	Pleasant Valley	Macclesfield	3 divisions (1967–1971)
1968	Heathfield-Aldgate	Pleasant Valley	Littlehampton	3 divisions (1967–1971)
1967	Heathfield-Aldgate	Pleasant Valley	Meadows	3 divisions (1967–1971)

== AFL Players ==
The following were drafted to AFL club lists having previously participated in the Hills Football League.

Name	HFL Club	Year Drafted	SANFL Club (or equiv.)	AFL Club(s)
Brenton Sanderson	Blackwood	1992	Sturt	Adelaide, Collingwood, Geelong
Scott Burns	Birdwood	1992	Norwood	Collingwood
Brett James	Kersbrook	1992	Norwood	Collingwood, Adelaide
Steven Sziller	Lobethal	1994	Woodville-West Torrens	St Kilda, Richmond
Roger James	Kersbrook	1996	Norwood	Port Adelaide
Ben Nelson	Bridgewater	1996	Sturt	Carlton, Adelaide
Barnaby French	Ironbank-Cherry Gardens	1997	Sturt	Port Adelaide, Carlton
Sudjai Cook	Kersbrook	1998	Norwood	Adelaide
Courtney Johns	Onkaparinga Valley	2002	East Fremantle	Essendon
Darren Pfeiffer	Birdwood	2005	Norwood	Adelaide, Carlton, Port Adelaide
Cleve Hughes	Lobethal	2005	Norwood	Richmond
Benet Copping	Mt Barker	2006	Sturt	Fremantle
Paul Cahill	Blackwood	2008	Sturt	St Kilda
Matthew Jaensch	Hahndorf	2009	Sturt	Adelaide
Sam Colquhoun	Birdwood	2013	Central Districts	Port Adelaide
Alex Georgiou	Lobethal	2013	Norwood	Melbourne
Matthew Fuller	Lobethal	2013	Norwood	Western Bulldogs
Dean Gore	Hahndorf	2014	Sturt	Geelong, Adelaide
Mitch Crowden	Meadows	2017	Sturt	Fremantle
Callum Coleman-Jones	Blackwood	2017	Sturt	Richmond
Tom Sparrow	Bridgewater	2018	South Adelaide	Melbourne
Jacob Molier	Onkaparinga Valley	2024	Sturt	Geelong

Harley barker mt barker 2025 Sturt

== Books ==
- Encyclopedia of South Australian country football clubs / compiled by Peter Lines. ISBN 9780980447293
- South Australian country football digest / by Peter Lines ISBN 9780987159199
