= Uraidla Districts Football Club =

Uraidla Districts
- Full name: Uraidla Districts Football Club Inc.
- Nickname: Demons
- Sport: Australian rules football
- Founded: 1997 (merger)
- League: Hills Football League
- Home ground: Uraidla Oval, Uraidla
- Colours: Blue, Red
- President: David Vince
- Head coach: Matt Down
- Website: http://uraidlafc.com/

The Uraidla Districts Football Club is an Australian rules football club based in the eastern suburbs of Adelaide which was formed in 1997 as a merger between the former Uraidla Football Club and Eastern Rangers Football Club. The combined club joined the Hills Football League Central Division and currently continue to field teams in both Senior and Junior grades in Division 1 of that league.

== A-Grade Premierships ==
- Hills Football League Division 1/Central Division (5)
  - 2005
  - 2009
  - 2010
  - 2011
  - 2013

== Merger history ==
Uraidla Districts was formed in 1997 through the amalgamation of Uraidla and Eastern Rangers.

=== Uraidla ===
The Uraidla Football Club was formed in 1905 and joined the Mount Lofty Football Association in 1921. One year later they absorbed the Summertown Football Club and in 1938 they shifted to the Hills Football Association. In 1961, Uraidla joined the Torrens Valley Football Association before becoming an inaugural member of the Hills Football League, playing in the Central Zone. Following the restructure of the league, Uraidla were placed in Division 1 where they remained until they merged with Division 2 club Eastern Rangers after the 1996 season.

A-Grade Premierships

- Mount Lofty Football Association (3)
  - 1923
  - 1930
  - 1931
  - 1932
- Hills Football Association A1 (3)
  - 1956
  - 1958
  - 1959
- Torrens Valley Football Association (1)
  - 1963
- Hills Football League Division 1 (4)
  - 1979
  - 1980
  - 1989
  - 1996

==== Summertown ====
The Summertown Football Club was formed in 1904 and was an inaugural member of the Mount Lofty Football Association in 1921. In 1922, Summertown was merged with the Uraidla Football Club and continued under the Uraidla name.

=== Eastern Rangers ===
The Eastern Rangers Football Club was formed in 1983 from a merger of the Ashton Football Club and the Lenswood Rangers Football Club. Eastern Rangers joined the Hills Football League Division 1 competition, dropping to Division 2 in 1994 where they remained until they merged with the Uraidla Football Club in 1997.

A-Grade Premierships

- Hills Football League Division 1 (1)
  - 1987

==== Ashton ====
The Ashton Football Club was an inaugural member of the Mount Lofty Football Association in 1921 before shifting to the East Torrens Football Association in 1938. Ashton joined the Hills Football Association in 1949 and returned to the East Torrens Football Association in 1962. Ashton continued in the Norwood-North Football Association from 1969 until they joined the Hills Football League Division 2 competition in 1972 where they played until they combined with the Lenswood Rangers Football Club in 1983, forming the Eastern Rangers Football Club.

A-Grade Premierships

- Mount Lofty Football Association (2)
  - 1936
  - 1937
- East Torrens Football Association (2)
  - 1938
  - 1940 Undefeated
- Hills Football Association A1 (1)
  - 1949

==== Lenswood Rangers ====
The Lenswood Rangers Football Club was established in 1967 from a merger of the Forest Range Football Club and the Lenswood Football Club and were inaugural members of the Hills Football League Northern Zone competition. Following the restructure of the league in 1972, Lenswood Rangers were shifted into the Division 4 competition and were promoted to Division 2 in 1974. In 1983 they merged with the Ashton Football Club to form the Eastern Rangers Football Club.

A-Grade Premierships

- Hills Football League Division 2 (2)
  - 1978
  - 1979

===== Forest Range =====
The Forest Range Football Club was formed in 1902 and joined the Hills Football Association, later shifting to the Mount Lofty Football Association in 1921. After a short stint in the East Torrens Football Association from 1929 to 1933, Forest Range returned to the Mount Lofty Football Association before going into recess in 1939. Following World War II, Forest Range reformed and joined the Hills Football Association in 1946 and in 1949 split into two clubs, a smaller Forest Range Football Club and a new Lenswood Football Club, with both teams being relegated to the B-Grade competition. Forest Range were promoted to A-Grade in 1952, but relegated again in 1955 before returning to the East Torrens Football Association in 1960. Forest Range and Lenswood reunited in 1967 as the merged Lenswood Rangers Football Club.

A-Grade Premierships

- Hills Football Association A2 (2)
  - 1949
  - 1950

===== Lenswood =====
The Lenswood Football Club was formed in 1949 as a breakaway from the Forest Range Football Club and joined the Hills Football Association B-Grade completion. In 1954, Lenswood shifted to the Torrens Valley Football Association but were relegated to the A2 competition in 1959. Lenswood reunited with Forest Range in 1967 as the merged Lenswood Rangers Football Club.

A-Grade Premierships

- Hills Football Association A2 (1)
  - 1952
- Torrens Valley Football Association A2 (3)
  - 1959
  - 1960
  - 1962
