= Mount Lofty District Football Club =

Mount Lofty District

Names
- Full name: Mount Lofty District Football Club Inc.
- Nickname(s): Devils

Club details
- Founded: 1978 (merger)
- Colours: red white
- Competition: Hills Football League
- President: Kym Welsby
- Ground(s): Heathfield Oval, Heathfield

Uniforms
Home

Other information
- Official website: mtloftydevils.com.au

The Mount Lofty District Football Club is an Australian rules football team based in the eastern suburbs of Adelaide which was formed in late 1978 as a merger between the former Stirling Football Club and Heathfield-Aldgate United Football Club. Adopting the moniker of "Mountain Devils", Mount Lofty initially joined the South Australian Football Association (SAFA) competition in the 1979 season and participated in that league until the end of the 1985 season. In 1986, Mount Lofty joined the Hills Football League and currently continue to field teams in both Senior and Junior grades in that competition.

Mount Lofty has produced a number of Australian Football League (AFL) players including Troy Broadbridge (Melbourne), David Welsby (Geelong). Prior to amalgamation, Heathfield-Aldgate produced Robbert Klomp, who played Victorian Football League (VFL) football for Carlton and Footscray.

== A-Grade Premierships ==
- South Australian Football Association A2 (1)
  - 1981
- Hills Football League Division 1/Central Division (5)
  - 1986 Division 1
  - 1990 Division 1
  - 2006 Central Division
  - 2007 Central Division
  - 2008 Central Division
- Hills Football League Division 2/Country Division (1)
  - 2014 Country Division

== Merger history ==
Mount Lofty District was formed in 1978 through the amalgamation of Heathfield-Aldgate United and Stirling.

=== Heathfield-Aldgate United ===
The Heathfield-Aldgate United Football Club was formed in 1967 from a merger of the Aldgate Football Club and the Heathfield Football Club. Initially competing in the Central Zone of the newly formed Hills Football League, Heathfield-Aldgate continued in Division 1 of the same competition from 1972 until its merger with Stirling at the end of the 1978 season. Heathfield-Aldgate still hold the record for most A-Grade premierships (9) in the Hills Football League.

A-Grade Premierships

- Hills Football League Central Zone (3)
  - 1967
  - 1968
  - 1971
- Hills Football League Division 1 (6)
  - 1972
  - 1973
  - 1974
  - 1975
  - 1976
  - 1977

==== Aldgate ====
The Aldgate Football Club was a member of the Mount Lofty Football Association from 1921 until it shifted to the Hills Central Football Association in 1927. In 1936, Aldgate joined the Hills Football Association, where they competed, including a drop to the B-Grade competition from 1952 to 1955, until they returned to Hills Central Football Association in 1962 and then merged with Heathfield in 1967.

A-Grade Premierships

- Hills Central Football Association (2)
  - 1927
  - 1934
- Hills Football Association A2 (1)
  - 1953

==== Heathfield ====
The Heathfield Football Club was formed in 1955 as a breakaway from the Stirling Football Club. Initially joining the Hills Football Association A2 competition, Heathfield transferred to the Hills Central Football Association A2 competition in 1962. In 1967 Heathfield amalgamated with the Aldgate Football Club to form the Heathfield-Aldgate United Football Club.

=== Stirling ===
The Stirling Football Club was formed in the 1800s, eventually joining the Hills Football Association in 1904. In 1921, Stirling transferred to the Mount Lofty Football Association before returning to the Hills Football Association in 1938. Stirling was a member of the Torrens Valley Football Association from 1962 until the formation of the Hills Football League in 1967. Stirling competed initially in the Central Zone of the Hills Football League and continued in Division 1 of the same competition from 1972 until its merger with Heathfield-Aldgate United at the end of the 1978 season.

A-Grade Premierships

- Mount Lofty Football Association (9)
  - 1921
  - 1922
  - 1924 Undefeated
  - 1925 Undefeated
  - 1926
  - 1927
  - 1928
  - 1929
  - 1934
- Hills Football Association A1 (9)
  - 1946
  - 1947
  - 1950
  - 1952
  - 1953
  - 1954
  - 1955
  - 1957
  - 1960
