= Sampson (surname) =

Sampson is a surname, and may refer to:

== People ==
=== A ===
- Aaron Sampson, several people
- Adrian Sampson (born 1991), baseball player
- Agnes Sampson, (died 1591), Scottish woman accused of witchcraft
- Al Sampson (1916–1976), American football coach
- Alex Sampson (born 2004), Canadian singer
- Alf Sampson (1912–2001), Australian rules footballer
- Angus Sampson (born 1975), Australian actor
- Anthony Sampson (1926–2004), British journalist and non-fiction writer

=== B ===
- Brandon Sampson (born 1997), basketball player for Hapoel Be'er Sheva of the Israeli Basketball Premier League
- Brian Sampson (disambiguation), several people
- Burford Sampson (1882–1959), Australian politician

=== C ===
- Catherine Sampson (born 1962), British novelist
- Charles Rumney Samson (1883–1931), British naval aviation and armoured vehicle pioneer
- Chris Sampson (born 1978), American baseball player
- Cindy Sampson (born 1978), Canadian actress
- Clay Sampson (born 1976), Australian rules footballer
- Clark Sampson, American curler

=== D ===
- Dane Sampson (born 1986), Australian sports shooter
- David Sampson (born 1951), American composer
- Daz Sampson (born 1974), British dance music producer
- Dean Sampson (born 1967), English rugby league player
- Deborah Sampson (1760–1827), early American soldier
- Doug Sampson (born 1957), English drummer
- Dylan Sampson (born 2004), American football player

=== E ===
- Edgar Sampson (1907–1973), American composer
- Emma Sampson (born 1985), Australian cricketer

=== F ===
- Francis A. Sampson (1842–1918), American lawyer and historian
- Francis L. Sampson (1912–1996), Catholic priest and U.S. Army officer
- Franklin Augustus Sampson (1906–1992), Canadian war hero and diplomat

=== G ===
- Gary Sampson (disambiguation)
- Geoffrey Sampson (born 1944), English linguist
- George Sampson (born 1993), English breakdancer, winner of Britain's Got Talent 2008 at age 14
- Glen Sampson (born 1960), Australian Rules footballer
- Godfrey Sampson (1902–1949), English composer and organist
- Gordie Sampson (born 1971), Canadian singer-songwriter

=== H ===
- Henry Sampson (disambiguation)
- Hugh Charles Sampson (1878–1953), British economic botanist

=== J ===
- Jamal Sampson (born 1983), American basketball player
- James "Jum" Sampson (born c.1876), Australian rugby union player
- Jill Sampson, Canadian veterinarian
- Joel Sampson, Tobago politician
- John A. Sampson (1873–1946), American gynaecologist
- John Patterson Sampson (1837–1928), American abolitionist, newspaper publisher, writer, lawyer, judge, and minister
- Julia Sampson Hayward (1934–2011), American tennis player
- Justin Sampson (born 1966), Australian rugby union player

=== K ===
- Kellen Sampson (born 1985), American basketball coach
- Kelvin Sampson (born 1955), American basketball coach
- Kevin Sampson (American football) (born 1981), American football player
- Kevin Sampson (writer), American writer
- Kevin Blythe Sampson (born 1954), American artist
- Kyle Sampson, American lawyer and political appointee

=== M ===
- Malcolm Sampson, English rugby league player
- Margaret Sampson (1906–1988), English nun
- Marty Sampson (born 1979), Australian songwriter

=== N ===
- Nikos Sampson (1935–2001), Greek Cypriot terrorist and brief puppet president of Cyprus

=== O ===
- Oteman Sampson (born 1975), American football player

=== P ===
- Paul Sampson (born 1977), English rugby union player

=== Q ===
- Quentin Sampson (born 2000) Guyana and West Indies cricketer

=== R ===
- Ralph Sampson (born 1960), American basketball player
- Ralph Allan Sampson (1866–1939), British astronomer
- Richard Sampson (died 1554), ex-Catholic Anglican bishop of Chichester and Bishop of Lichfield and Coventry
- Richard Sampson (1877–1944), Australian politician
- Rob Sampson (born 1955), Canadian politician
- Robert Sampson (disambiguation)
- Robin Sampson (1940–2024), New Zealand archer

=== S ===
- Short Sleeve Sampson, American wrestler
- Steve Sampson (born 1957), American soccer coach

=== T ===
- Thomas Pollard Sampson (1875 – 1961), Australian architect
- Todd Sampson (born 1970), Canadian-born Australian company director and television personality
- Tony Sampson, retired Canadian actor

=== V ===
- Virginia Reid Sampson (1916–1955), birth name of American actress Lynne Carver

=== W ===
- Will Sampson (1933–1987), American actor and painter
- William Sampson (disambiguation)

=== Y ===
- Yvonne Sampson (born 1980), Australian sports commentator

== Fictional characters ==
- Dominie Sampson, from the novel Guy Mannering by Sir Walter Scott
- Kid Sampson, in Joseph Heller's classic novel Catch-22
- Kyle Sampson (GL), on the television show The Guiding Light
- Tor Sampson, a character in the Netflix series Grand Army

== See also ==
- Samson (disambiguation)
- Alice Sampson Presto, American suffragist and politician
