= Pilmore Cup =

Australian rules football competition

The Pilmore Cup is an annual Australian rules football competition held between representative teams from the Southern Football League and the Great Southern Football League established in 2013.

The Pilmore Cup match is grouped with an U/17.5 match between the two leagues playing for the Greg Whittlesea Cup, named after Greg Whittlesea and an U/15 match played for the South Shield, named after the South Adelaide Football Club.

The Pilmore Cup is named after Barry Pilmore who has been involved with both leagues as an elite player (Southern) and an elite coach (Great Southern).

== Winners ==
Year	Pilmore Cup (Senior Men)	Jan Bache Cup (Senior Women)	Greg Whittlesea Shield (U/17.5 Boys)	U/17 Girls	South Shield (U/15 Boys)	Venue
2013	Great Southern FL		Southern FL		Great Southern FL	Hickinbotham Oval
2014	Great Southern FL		Southern FL		Southern FL	Strathalbyn Oval
2015	Great Southern FL		Southern FL		Great Southern FL	Hickinbotham Oval
2016	Great Southern FL		Great Southern FL		Great Southern FL	Strathalbyn Oval
2017	Southern FL		Great Southern FL		Great Southern FL	Morphett Vale Memorial Oval
2018	Southern FL		Great Southern FL		Southern FL	Strathalbyn Oval
2019	Great Southern FL		Southern FL		Southern FL	Morphett Vale Memorial Oval
2020	not held		not held		not held	not held
2021	Southern FL	Great Southern FL	Southern FL	Great Southern FL	Southern FL	Strathalbyn Oval
2022	Great Southern FL	Great Southern FL	Southern FL	Great Southern FL	Southern FL	Bice Oval
2023	Great Southern FL	Great Southern FL	Southern FL	Southern FL	Southern FL	Strathalbyn Oval
2024	Southern FL	Great Southern FL	Great Southern FL	Southern FL	Southern FL	Bice Oval
2025	Southern FL	Great Southern FL	Southern FL	Great Southern FL	Southern FL	Strathalbyn Oval
2026	Great Southern FL	Southern FL	Great Southern FL	Southern FL	Great Southern FL	Reynella Oval

== Results ==
=== 2013 ===
The 2013 Pilmore Cup was hosted by the Southern Football League at Hickinbotham Oval on Saturday 8 June

==== Pilmore Cup ====
Great Southern Football League 20.10 (130) d Southern Football League 11.13 (79)
Best:
Great Southern: Simon Munn, Mitchell Portlock, Scott Hunt, Jake Ashton-Place, Mathew Hodge, Thomas Derham.
Southern: Christopher Minns, Jacob Crate, Nicholas Mott, Jason Farrier, Ian Brown, Ryan Mahony.
Goals:
Great Southern: Mathew Hodge, Marcus Burdett, Jake Ashton-Place, Thomas Derham 3 each, Tyson Neale 2, Tom Pinyon, Simon Munn, Mitchell Portlock, Timothy Boyd 1 each.
Southern: Andrew Carter, Tyler Harman, Ryan Mahony 2 each, Tom McNamara, Tristan Pearce, Luke O'Brien, Mark Ruwoldt, Ian Brown 1 each.
Date: Saturday, 8 June 2013
Venue: Hickinbotham Oval

==== Greg Whittlesea Shield ====
Southern Football League 12.7 (79) d Great Southern Football League 11.4 (70)
Best:
Southern: Joshua Penney, Shane Harvey, Brayden Heyward-Ferors, Nicholas Knight, Brayden Roberts, Jack Glazbrook.
Great Southern: Nathan Beer, Jonathan Cook, Callum Le Ray, Kurt Lindner, Andrew Pahuru, Caleb Vears .
Goals:
Southern: Jack Glazbrook 5, Jai Robinson, Shane Harvey 2 each, Jordan Monopoli, Ashley Lane, Karim Hrynkiw 1 each
Great Southern: Callum Le Ray 5, Jonathan Cook 2, Ryan Haverty, Lachlan Hourigan, Cameron Hutchens, Josh Marshall 1 each.
Date: Saturday, 8 June 2013
Venue: Hickinbotham Oval

==== South Shield ====
Great Southern Football League 7.9 (51) d Southern Football League 3.2 (20)
Best:
Great Southern: Bradley Borrillo, Lachlan Borrillo, Jacob Wright, Damien Dowzard, Ryan Mayes, Jesse Fitzgerald.
Southern: Jackson Daniels, Corey May, Kaleb Wilden, Russell Williams, Blake Lawrence, Braydn Russell.
Goals:
Great Southern: Beau Walkom 2, Jack Weller, Bradley Borrillo, Ryan Collier, Travis Bartlett, Cody Connor 1 each.
Southern: Corey May, Austinn Wurst, Kaleb Wilden 1 each
Date: Saturday, 8 June 2013
Venue: Hickinbotham Oval

=== 2014 ===
The 2014 Pilmore Cup was hosted by the Great Southern Football League at Strathalbyn Oval on Saturday 7 June.

==== Pilmore Cup ====
Great Southern Football League 12.15 (87) d Southern Football League 12.8 (80)
Best:
Great Southern: Tom Carroll, Sam Alexopoulos, Curtis Perrey, Matthew Tonkin, Marcus Burdett, Jarrod Kellock.
Southern: Will Rivers, Chris Minns, Nick Mott, Patrick Jolly, Ciaran O'Hagan.
Goals:
Great Southern: Tom Carroll, Josh Proctor, Marcus Burdett 2 each, Sam McDonald, Sam Elliott, Scott Hunt, Curtis Perrey, Tom Pinyon, Ryan Butler 1 each.
Southern: Ciaran O'Hagan 5, Tom McNamara 4, Andrew Crate, Dwayne Ruddock, Joel Brown 1 each.
Date: Saturday, 7 June 2014
Venue: Strathalbyn Oval

==== Greg Whittlesea Shield ====
Southern Football League 12.8 (80) d Great Southern Football League 6.6 (42)
Best:
Southern: Nicholas Frisby-Smith, Christopher Curyer, Thomas Boreham, Ryan Need, Benjamin Spencer, Bailey Sowter.
Great Southern: Todd Milford, Thomas Bonnes, Thomas Bennett, Mathew Kreuger, Jedd Rothe, Thomas Neville.
Goals:
Southern: Jake Block 3, Christopher Curyer, Matthew Thomas 2 each, Ryan Need, Adrian Albanese, Tyson Schmid, Josh Niven, Bradley Patterson 1 each
Great Southern: Jedd Rothe 3, Thomas Bennett, Jack Weller, Callum Leray 1 each.
Date: Saturday, 7 June 2014
Venue: Strathalbyn Oval

==== South Shield ====
Southern Football League 7.6 (48) d Great Southern Football League 4.14 (38)
Best:
Southern: Travis Stone, Damon Arnold, Brody Thomson, Tate Coleman, Bowen Mitton, Daniel Buechter.
Great Southern: James Bradford, Nathan Kreuger, Jack Hourigan, Mitchell Cleggett, Thomas Pearsons, Kane Milford.
Goals:
Southern: Travis Stone 4, Robert Irra, Ryan Mountford 1
Great Southern: Jordan Boots 2, Kane Milford, Thomas Pearsons 1 each.
Date: Saturday, 7 June 2014
Venue: Strathalbyn Oval

=== 2015 ===
The 2015 Pilmore Cup was hosted by the Southern Football League at Hickinbotham Oval on Saturday 6 June

==== Pilmore Cup ====
Great Southern Football League 21.19 (145) d Southern Football League 4.8 (32)
Best:
Great Southern: Rigby Barnes, Elijah Horrocks, Charles Sharples, Brett Ellis, Matthew Tonkin, Aaron Killian.
Southern: Jonathan Eagleton, Will Rivers, Scott Carpenter, Tyson Slattery, Ben Lockett, Matthew Raitt.
Goals:
Great Southern: Elijah Horrocks, Marc Elliott 4 each, Ziggy Vitkunas 3, Jake Standfield, Tynan Keeley, Denis Iljcesen, Ryan Haverty 2 each, Rigby Barnes, Dylan Camac 1 each.
Southern: Matthew Raitt, Tyson Slattery, David Kearsley, Mitchell Minns 1 each.
Date: Saturday, 6 June 2015
Venue: Hickinbotham Oval

==== Greg Whittlesea Shield ====
Southern Football League 6.9 (45) d Great Southern Football League 4.7 (31)
Best:
Southern: Kalem Greenwood, Zach Evreniadis, Nicholas Steele, Angus Stangewitz, Nicholas Frisby-Smith.
Great Southern: Jedd Rothe, Harry Hutton, Kane Milford, Jake Lander, Travis Bartlett, Tyson Hoffman.
Goals:
Southern: Matthew Lillis, Travis Stone, Matthew Caire, Bodie Sowter, Harrison McMillan, Jesse Pu McCarthy 1 each
Great Southern: Jedd Rothe, Cameron Cull, Connor McNeill, Cody Connor 1 each.
Date: Saturday, 6 June 2015
Venue: Hickinbotham Oval

==== South Shield ====
Great Southern Football League 10.11 (71) d Southern Football League 6.3 (39)
Best:
Great Southern: Jake Tarca, James Bradford, Hayden Sampson, Job Colwell, Lochlan Bradley.
Southern: Ruben Flinn, Samuel Whitbread, Jonty Manuel.
Goals:
Great Southern: Jake Tarca 5, Job Colwell 3, Hayden Sampson, Billy Wade 1 each
Southern: Mackenzie Short 2, Samuel Whitbread, Bailey Marshman, Tyler Davies, Tyler Oliver 1 each.
Date: Saturday, 6 June 2015
Venue: Hickinbotham Oval

=== 2016 ===
The 2016 Pilmore Cup was hosted by the Great Southern Football League at Strathalbyn Oval on Saturday 11 June.

==== Pilmore Cup ====
Great Southern Football League 24.5 (149) d Southern Football League 14.10 (94)
Best:
Great Southern: Tyson Neale, Dylan Camac, Curtis Perrey, Ben Simounds, Sam Alexopoulos, Luke Button.
Southern: Will Rivers, Nick Mott, Samuel Smith, Shane Heatley, Christopher Barns, Samuel Tharaldsen.
Goals:
Great Southern: Ben Simounds 6, Tyson Neale 4, Marc Elliott, Joshua Vick, Tom Pinyon 3 each, Luke Button, Shaun Maxfield, Thomas Ferguson, Bradley Clarke, Braden Altus 1 each.
Southern: Samuel Smith 5, Denis Iljcesen 4, Samuel Tharaldsen, Christopher Barns, Nick Mott, Dwayne Ruddock, Christopher Bradwell 1 each.
Date: Saturday, 11 June 2016
Venue: Strathalbyn Oval

==== Greg Whittlesea Shield ====
Great Southern Football League 14.10 (94) d Southern Football League 5.1 (31)
Best:
Great Southern: Bradley Borrillo, Darcy Clifford, Joshua Strangroome, Kane Milford, Cody Connor, Jackson Elmes.
Southern: Bradley Warner, Jack Fitzpatrick, Cooper McRae, Keelan Boehm, Mark Larritt, Robert Kernick.
Goals:
Great Southern: Lachlan Borrillo 3, Jackson Elmes, Bradley Borrillo, Scott Kilgallon, Mitchell Cleggett 2 each, Cody Connor, Kane Milford, Joshua Strangroome 1 each.
Southern: Keelan Boehm 4, Ethan Millen 1.
Date: Saturday, 11 June 2016
Venue: Strathalbyn Oval

==== South Shield ====
Great Southern Football League 6.7 (43) d Southern Football League 2.8 (20)
Best:
Great Southern: Jake Austin, Jack Fitzgerald, Lachlan Costello, Marcus Lippett, Thomas Neville.
Southern: Kyle Jongenelis, Mackenzie Short, Isaac Osborne-O'Keefe, Shane Pettiford, Harry Spacie, Alexander Marra.
Goals:
Great Southern: Jack Fitzgerald, Aaron Douglass 2 each, Thomas Neville, Matthew Roberts 1 each
Southern: Mackenzie Short.
Date: Saturday, 11 June 2016
Venue: Strathalbyn Oval

=== 2017 ===
The 2017 Pilmore Cup was hosted by the Southern Football League at Morphett Vale Memorial Oval on Saturday 10 June.

==== Pilmore Cup ====
Southern Football League 14.9 (93) d Great Southern Football League 10.9 (69)
Best:
Southern: Michael Galley, Michael Shearer, Danny Irvine, Steven Copestick, Michael Smith, Scott O'Shaughnessy
Great Southern: Thomas Derham, Hamish Tonkin, Ryan Sherry, Sean Beath, Scott Ogilvie, Cameron Hutchens
Goals:
Southern: Samuel Smith 4, Michael Galley, Dennis Iljcesen, Troy Johnson, Jacob Crate, Tyler Harman 2 each
Great Southern: Tom Pinyon, Ryan Sherry, Thomas Derham 2 each, James Hutchinson, Ryan Mayes, Tyson Slattery, Ben Simounds 1 each
Date: Saturday, 10 June 2017
Venue: Morphett Vale Memorial Oval

==== Greg Whittlesea Shield ====
Great Southern Football League 12.4 (76) d Southern Football League 7.8 (50)
Best:
Great Southern: Daniel Marr, Ryleigh Crombie, Jack Fitzpatrick, Jack Burns, Sam Renney, Kane Andrewartha.
Southern: Callum Gaspari, Blake Clark, Chris Hunter, Luke Calderbank, Tyler Davies, Zachary Williams.
Goals:
Great Southern: Jackson Dalitz 3, Logan Payne, Syed Hansen 2 each, Liam Hutchinson, Liam Stirling, Jake Tarca, Daniel Marr, Jack Burns 1 each.
Southern: Luke Calderbank 4, Tyler Davies, Nicholas McLean, Bailey Marshman 1 each.
Date: Saturday, 10 June 2017
Venue: Morphett Vale Memorial Oval

==== South Shield ====
Great Southern Football League 8.2 (50) d Southern Football League 4.9 (33)
Best:
Great Southern: Shannon Jones, Matthew Roberts, James Hurrell, Arlo Draper, John Morris.
Southern: Nicholas Kraemer, Kyle Daris, Cooper Gilbert, George Chandler, Harry Spacie.
Goals:
Great Southern: Adam Terrall 2, Cooper Rogers, Jaspar Prusa, Arlo Draper, Brodie Niessen, Luke Goodieson, Jett Holberton 1 each
Southern: Cooper Gilbert, Michael Comley, Declan Henty-Smith, Nicholas Kraemer 1 each.
Date: Saturday, 10 June 2017
Venue: Morphett Vale Memorial Oval

=== 2018 ===
The 2018 Pilmore Cup was hosted by the Great Southern Football League at Strathalbyn Oval on Saturday 11 June.

==== Pilmore Cup ====
Southern Football League 17.7 (109) d Great Southern Football League 15.8 (98)
Best:
Southern: Josh Vandermeer, Neil Reeve, Adrian Albanese, Damon Arnold, David Kearsley, Toby McAllister.
Great Southern: Benjamin Davis, Callum Tonkin, Lachlan Mathews, Matthew Merrett, Curtis Perrey, Michael Corbett.
Goals:
Southern: Mitchell Johnson 4, Damon Arnold 3, Nicholas Mott, Samuel Smith, Josh Albanese, Josh Vandermeer 2 each, Daniel Trevena, Benjamin Rossi 1 each
Great Southern: Benjamin Davis, Brett Ellis, Curtis Perrey, Bradley Merrett, Marc Elliott 2 each, Callum Tonkin, Jamie Smith, Michael Corbett, Sean Beath, Caleb Howell
Date: Saturday, 9 June 2018
Venue: Strathalbyn Oval

==== Greg Whittlesea Shield ====
Great Southern Football League 15.13 (103) d Southern Football League 9.4 (58)
Best:
Great Southern: Lachlan Williams, Zachary Dowling, Mani Draper, Ashley Goodieson, Jayden Turner, Benjamin Hamilton.
Southern: Lachlan Wethers, Luke Calderbank, James Hay, Zachary Williams, Shaye Connolly, Bradley Strapps.
Goals:
Great Southern: Mani Draper 7, Jackson Dalitz 3, Samuel Bentley, Liam Stirling 2 each, Matthew Bray 1.
Southern: Luke Calderbank 4, Nicholas Robertson 2, Hayden Kernahan, Aidan King, Bradley Strapps 1 each.
Date: Saturday, 9 June 2018
Venue: Strathalbyn Oval

== Players ==
=== Both Leagues ===
Two players have played for both teams in the Pilmore Cup

Name	GSFL Club	Games	Years	SFL Club	Games	Years	Total Games
Denis Iljcesen	Victor Harbor	1	2015	Morphett Vale	2	2016-17	3
Tyson Slattery	Goolwa-Port Elliot	1	2017	Marion	1	2015	2

=== Southern Football League ===
Name	Club	Years	Games
Aiden Baker	Flagstaff Hill	2018	1
Josh Albanese	Flagstaff Hill	2019	1
Jake Anderson	Noarlunga	2019	1
Damon Arnold	Reynella	2018-19	2
Aiden Baker	Morphett Vale	2017	1
Christopher Barns	Morphettville Park	2016	1
Jacob Battifuoco	Happy Valley	2014	1
Ashley Baxter	O’Sullivan Beach-Lonsdale	2013	1
Mathew Beinke	Aldinga	2019	1
Justin Bollenhagen	Hackham	2014	1
Thomas Boreham	Aldinga	2017	1
Luke Bowd	Hackham	2013	1
Christopher Bradwell	Reynella	2016	1
Adam Broadbent	Reynella	2016	1
Ian Brown	Port Noarlunga	2013, 15	2
Joel Brown	Happy Valley	2014	1
Jay-J Butler-Chaseling	Hackham	2015	1
Matt Carey	Flagstaff Hill	2015	1
Jacob Carger	Brighton	2016	1
Andrew Carlin	Morphettville Park	2015	1
Scott Carpenter	Morphett Vale	2015	1
Andrew Carter	Noarlunga	2013	1
Jack Carter (1)	Marion	2013	1
Jack Carter (2)	Reynella	2016	1
Luke Caruso	Hackham	2014	1
Zakaria Cavouras	Flagstaff Hill	2019	1
Aidan Coakley	Christies Beach	2019	1
Steven Copestick	Noarlunga	2015, 17	2
Andrew Crate	Christies Beach	2014	1
Jacob Crate	Christies Beach	2013, 17	2
Casey Davies	Flagstaff Hill	2017	1
Jonathan Eagleton	Happy Valley	2014-15	2
Codey Ellison	Reynella	2015	1
Jason Farrier	Reynella	2013	1
Chad Francis	Reynella	2016	1
Michael Galley	Cove	2017, 19	2
Scott Grieve	Cove	2019	1
Jack Guy	Reynella	2014	1
Tyler Harman	Aldinga	2013, 17	2
Shane Heatley	Flagstaff Hill	2016, 18	2
Nathan Hedger	Port Noarlunga	2015	1
Brayden Heyward-Ferors	Flagstaff Hill	2019	1
Shane Hill	Morphett Vale	2017	1
Brendan Hillier	Brighton	2016	1
Lee Hoey	Morphett Vale	2017	1
Danny Irvine	Noarlunga	2017	1
Matthew Johncock	Noarlunga	2016	1
Mitchell Johnson	Flagstaff Hill	2017-19	3
Troy Johnson	Noarlunga	2017, 19	2
Patrick Jolly	Christies Beach	2014	1
David Kearsley	Flagstaff Hill	2015, 18-19	3
Shaun King	Christies Beach	2019	1
Bradley Kirk	Flagstaff Hill	2016-18	3
Daniel Lee	Hackham, Christies Beach	2014, 17-18	3
Jarrad Liebelt	Noarlunga	2019	1
Ben Lockett	Reynella	2015-16	2
Hayden Mackin	Christies Beach	2013	1
Ryan Mahony	Reynella	2013, 17	2
Toby McAllister	Flagstaff Hill	2018-19	2
Benjamin McConnell	Morphettville Park	2013	1
Jarryd McCormack	Christies Beach	2018-19	2
Rhys McKay	Port Noarlunga	2013	1
Tom McNamara	Happy Valley	2013-14	2
Clayton Mesecke	Christies Beach	2018-19	2
Ky Miller	Noarlunga	2015	1
Sammual Miller	Noarlunga	2013, 15, 18-19	4
Christopher Minns	Noarlunga	2013-14, 18	3
Mitchell Minns	Reynella	2015-16	2
Nicholas Mott	Noarlunga	2013-16, 18	5
Thomas Mott	Noarlunga	2019	1
Alexander Moyle	Reynella	2015	1
Byron Murphy	Morphettville Park	2013-14	2
Daniel Nobes	Hackham	2014	1
Luke O'Brien	Port Noarlunga	2013	1
Ciaran O'Hagan	Port Noarlunga	2014	1
Scott O'Shaughnessy	Cove	2017-18	2
Bradley Patterson	Flagstaff Hill	2018-19	2
Tristan Pearce	Happy Valley	2013	1
Aaron Peterson	Port Noarlunga	2014	1
Matthew Raitt	Flagstaff Hill	2015	1
Neil Reeve	Christies Beach	2018	1
Ryan Richardson	Reynella	2013	1
William Rivers	Brighton	2014-16	3
Damian Roach	Cove	2017	1
Benjamin Rossi	Flagstaff Hill	2018	1
Dwayne Ruddock	Happy Valley	2013-14, 2016-18	5
Mark Ruwoldt	Morphettville Park	2013	1
Nathan Schulz	Noarlunga	2015, 19	2
Callan Semple	Reynella	2016	1
Michael Shearer	Flagstaff Hill	2014-18	5
Michael Smith	Morphett Vale	2017	1
Samuel Smith	Flagstaff Hill	2016-19	4
Thomas Starkey	Flagstaff Hill	2016	1
Nicholas Steele	Port Noarlunga	2019	1
Nathan Stock	Christies Beach	2014	1
Lachlan Sutton	Noarlunga	2014	1
Samuel Theraldsen	Flagstaff Hill	2016	1
Bradley Thompson	Reynella	2014	1
Daniel Trevena	Port Noarlunga	2015, 18	2
Josh Vandermeer	Flagstaff Hill	2018	1
Dylan Williams	Port Noarlunga	2019	1
Austinn Wurst	Noarlunga	2016	1

=== Great Southern Football League ===
Name	Club	Years	Games
Sam Alexopoulos	Willunga	2014, 2016-17	3
Braden Altus	Willunga	2016	1
Jake Ashton-Place	Yankalilla	2013	1
Rigby Barnes	Encounter Bay	2015	1
Daniel Batson	Strathalbyn	2014	1
Sean Beath	Willunga	2017	1
Timothy Boyd	Victor Harbor/Willunga	2013, 2016	2
Scott Brown	Willunga	2013	1
Tarquin Brown	Victor Harbor	2014-15, 17	3
Marcus Burdett	Willunga	2013-14	2
Ryan Butler	Langhorne Creek	2014	1
Luke Button	Yankalilla	2016	1
Dylan Camac	Mount Compass	2015-16	2
Thomas Carroll	Myponga-Sellicks	2014(C)	1
Christopher Clark	Strathalbyn	2013	1
Bradley Clarke	Myponga-Sellicks	2016-17	2
Luke Collier	Willunga	2014	1
Benn Cox	Willunga	2013	1
Thomas Derham	Langhorne Creek	2013, 17	2
Sam Elliott	Strathalbyn	2014	1
Marc Elliott	Strathalbyn	2015-16	2
Brett Ellis	McLaren	2014-15	2
Thomas Ferguson	Goolwa-Port Elliot	2016	1
Ryan Fisher	Yankalilla	2017	1
Brock Godwin-Knott	Goolwa-Port Elliot	2015	1
Bradley Haskett	Willunga	2013	1
Ryan Haverty	Myponga-Sellicks	2015	1
Riley Hayes	Willunga	2015	1
Peter Hoban	Mount Compass	2015	1
Mathew Hodge	Victor Harbor	2013	1
William Hooper	Encounter Bay	2017	1
Elijah Horrocks	Encounter Bay	2013, 2015-16	3
Scott Hunt	Myponga-Sellicks	2013-14, 2016	3
Adam Hunter	Mount Compass	2014-15	2
Cameron Hutchens	Willunga	2016-17	2
James Hutchinson	Myponga-Sellicks	2017	1
Tynan Keeley	Langhorne Creek	2013, 15	2
Jarrod Kellock	Langhorne Creek	2014	1
Aaron Killian	Langhorne Creek	2015-16	2
Shaun Maxfield	Mount Compass	2016	1
Cameron McDonald	McLaren	2014	1
Samuel McDonald	Strathalbyn	2014	1
Mitchell McRostie	Victor Harbor	2014	1
Ben Miels	Myponga-Sellicks	2017	1
Simon Munn	Strathalbyn	2013(C)	1
Tyson Neale	Encounter Bay	2013, 2016	2
Scott Ogilvie	Myponga-Sellicks	2014-15, 17	3
Curtis Perrey	Langhorne Creek	2013-17	5
Tom Pinyon	Mount Compass	2013-14, 2016-17	4
Mitchell Portlock	Willunga	2013	1
Joshua Proctor	McLaren	2014	1
Damon Ross	Willunga	2016	1
Michael Ross	Victor Harbor	2017	1
Charles Sharples	Encounter Bay	2015	1
Ryan Sherry	Willunga	2017	1
Ben Simounds	Strathalbyn	2013, 2016-17	3
Jake Standfield	Willunga	2014-16	3
Patrick Taggart	Encounter Bay	2013	1
Samuel Taggart	Encounter Bay	2014	1
Hamish Tonkin	Encounter Bay	2015-17	3
Matthew Tonkin	Langhorne Creek	2014-17	4
Joshua Vick	Goolwa-Port Elliot	2016	1
Tomas Vitkunas	Mount Compass	2015	1
Ziggy Vitkunas	Mount Compass	2015	1
Anton Vizzari	Victor Harbor	2017	1
Scott Wendelborn	Myponga-Sellicks	2013	1
Evan Williams	McLaren	2015	1
Callum Wilson	Goolwa-Port Elliot	2013	1
Matthew Wilson	Yankalilla	2013	1

== Coaches ==
=== Senior Game ===
Year	SFL Coach	Club	GSFL Coach	Club
2013	Trevor Mitton	Noarlunga		
2014	Matthew Dent	Happy Valley	Clay Sampson	Myponga-Sellicks
2015	Trevor Mitton	Noarlunga	Clay Sampson	Myponga-Sellicks
2016	Gianni Petrucci	Reynella	Mitch Portlock	Willunga
2017	Paul Crate	Christies Beach		
2018	Paul Crate	Christies Beach		
2019	Paul Crate	Christies Beach	Peter Galbraith	Mount Compass
2021			Scott Wendelborn	Myponga-Sellicks
2022			Gianni Petrucci	McLaren
2023			Gianni Petrucci	McLaren
2024	Brendan McKeough	Reynella		
2025	Brendan McKeough	Reynella	Darren Shillabeer	Myponga-Sellicks
2026	Brendan McKeough	Reynella	Damian Minervini	Willunga

=== Under 17.5 Boys Game ===
Year	SFL Coach	Club	GSFL Coach	Club
2013	Todd Bache	Christies Beach		
2014	Todd Bache	Christies Beach		
2015	Norm Bergmann	Port Noarlunga		
2016	Ben Coleman	Happy Valley		
2017	Craig Austin	Reynella		
2018				
2019				
2021				
2022				
2023				
2024				
2025				
2026			Sam Sherriff	Strathalbyn

=== Under 15 Game ===
Year	SFL Coach	Club	GSFL Coach	Club
2013			Darcy Springhall	Strathalbyn
2014	Ben Porter	Edwardstown		
2015	David Earl	Cove		
2016	Craig Austin	Reynella		
2017	Trevor Potts	-		

== Records ==
=== Most Games Played ===
Curtis Perrey of the Great Southern Football League is the only player to have appeared in all 5 Pilmore Cup matches.

Name	Games	League	Club
Curtis Perrey	5	GSFL	Langhorne Creek
Nicholas Mott	4	SFL	Noarlunga
Tom Pinyon	4	GSFL	Mount Compass
Dwayne Ruddock	4	SFL	Happy Valley
Michael Shearer	4	SFL	Flagstaff Hill
Matthew Tonkin	4	GSFL	Langhorne Creek

=== Most Represented Club ===
Club	League	Total Games
Willunga	GSFL	21
Noarlunga	SFL	18
Reynella	SFL	17
Langhorne Creek	GSFL	17
Flagstaff Hill	SFL	16
Encounter Bay	GSFL	15
Myponga-Sellicks	GSFL	13
Mount Compass	GSFL	12
Happy Valley	SFL	11
Strathalbyn	GSFL	10
Victor Harbor	GSFL	9
Port Noarlunga	SFL	8
Christies Beach	SFL	7
Morphett Vale	SFL	7
Hackham	SFL	6
Morphettville Park	SFL	6
Brighton Districts and Old Scholars	SFL	5
Goolwa-Port Elliot	GSFL	5
McLaren	GSFL	5
Aldinga	SFL	3
Cove	SFL	3
Yankalilla	GSFL	3
Marion	SFL	2
O'Sullivan Beach-Lonsdale	SFL	1
Edwardstown	SFL	0

== Medals ==
=== Kevin Curran Medal (GSFL Senior) ===
The player judged best on field for the Great Southern Football League in the Senior Game is awarded the Kevin Curran Medal.

Year	Winner
2013	Simon Munn
2014	Tom Carroll
2015	
2016	
2017	Shannon Jones
2018	
2019	Hamish Tonkin
2020	not held
2021	

=== Terry Thompson Medal (GSFL U/17.5) ===
The player judged best on field for the Great Southern Football League in the Under 17.5 game is awarded the Terry Thompson Medal.

Year	Winner
2013	
2014	Trent Milford
2015	
2016	
2017	Daniel Marr
2018	
2019	Wade Sweetman
2020	not held
2021	

=== Neville Miller Medal (GSFL U/15) ===
The player judged best on field for the Great Southern Football League in the Under 15 game is awarded the Neville Miller Medal.

Year	Winner
2013	
2014	James Bradford
2015	
2016	
2017	Thomas Derham
2018	
2019	
2020	not held
2021	Ryan Borlace

== Junior Match Players ==
=== 2013 ===
==== Greg Whittlesea Cup (U/17.5) ====
Southern: Blake Carter (MV), Jack Glazbrook (MV), Shane Harvey (BDOS), Brayden Heyward-Ferors (FH), Karim Hrynkiw (HV), Chase Johnson (Noar), Troy Johnson (Noar), Nicholas Knight (BDOS), Kostas Kontos (BDOS), Ashley Lane (HV), Elliot Modra (FH), Jordan Monopoli (Hack), Ryan Need (Cove), Joshua Penney (HV), Jai Robinson (MV), Brayden Roberts (FH), Nicholas Ruddock (HV), Tain Smelt (HV), Brock Syme (MV), Dylan Trezise (Cove), Josh Vandermeer (FH), Eyre White (Rey).

Great Southern: Nathan Beer, Matthew Bergamaschi, Thomas Boxer, Daniel Cleggett, Jonathan Cook, Ryan Haverty, Frazer Hayward, Lachlan Hourigan, Cameron Hutchens, James Hutchinson, Nicholas Lawrie, Callum Le Ray, James Ledgard, Kurt Lindner, Josh Marshall, Daniel McNicol, Aaron Noske, Andrew Pahuru, Cameron Pearce, Joel Van De Leur, Caleb Vears, Zachary Watson.

==== South Shield (U/15) ====
Great Southern: Cohan Bartlett, Steven Bartlett, Travis Bartlett, Jordan Boots, Bradley Borrillo, Lachlan Borrillo, Cody Bradshaw, Ryan Collier, Cody Connor, Jack Crispin, Cody Davenport, Damien Dowzard, Jesse Fitzgerald, Tyler Follett, Tyson Hoffmann, Tyson Levy, Billy Ludlow, Liam Magor, Ryan Mayes, Jesse McKinnon, Connor Mellow, Kane Milford, Thomas Pearsons, Beau Walkom, Jack Weller, Harrison Williams, Jacob Wright.

Southern: Josh Buckney (Mar), Jackson Daniels (PN), Caleb Dearman (HV), Zach Evreniadis (HV), Jason Goss (FH), Joshua Heading (FH), Jack Heffernan (Cove), Michael Henly (FH), Rory Holman (Noar), Richard Hore (OSBL), Blake Lawrence (Rey), Corey May (Edw), Mitchell Peat (PN), Christopher Quinsey (MVP), Braydn Russell (Rey), Nicholas Scholl-Geisler (CB), James Smitheram (Noar), Reece Staker (FH), Cameron Wall (Rey), Kaleb Wilden (Rey), Russell Williams (MVP), Austinn Wurst (Noar).

=== 2014 ===
==== Greg Whittlesea Cup (U/17.5) ====
Great Southern: Calvin Bache, Travis Bartlett, Thomas Bennett, Matthew Bergamaschi, Thomas Bonnes, Daniel Cleggett, Bradley Genockey, Jaamye Hopgood, James Hutchinson, Mathew Kreuger, Jack Lang, Callum Leray, Bryn Loots, Todd Milford, Thomas Neville, Thomas Osborne, Jedd Rothe, Justin Schindler, Joshua Simounds, Caleb Vears, Zachary Watson, Jack Weller.

Southern: Adrian Albanese (FH), Jake Block (Rey), Daniel Bode (MV), Thomas Boreham (Ald), Jarryd Brown (BDOS), Zakaria Cavouras (FH), Drew Crichton (BDOS), Christopher Curyer (HV), Casey Davies (FH), Nicholas Frisby-Smith (HV), Brayden Heyward-Ferors (FH), Hayden Kari (HV), Benjamin Millman (Hack), Ryan Need (Cove), Josh Niven (BDOS), Brady O'Hanlon (Ald), Bradley Patterson (FH), Tyson Schmid (BDOS), Bailey Sowter (Rey), Benjamin Spencer (CB), Patrick Sperling (FH), Matthew Thomas (CB).

==== South Shield (U/15) ====
Southern: Damon Arnold (Rey), Nathan Beenham (FH), Daniel Buechter (Noar), Tate Coleman (HV), Brandon Deroussent (MV), Dylan Gates (Noar), Jason Goss (FH), William Gregory (Rey), Jack Heffernan (Cove), Robert Irra (OSBL), Connor Lock (MV), Jonty Manuel (Rey), Christian McDonald (Rey), Cameron McGree (Rey), Bowen Mitton (Cove), Ryan Mountford (FH), Bailey Snelling (Noar), Kennedy Stewart (OSBL), Travis Stone (Ald), Brody Thomson (Rey), Eric Tink (MV), Matthew Walton (HV).

Great Southern: Jordan Boots, James Bradford, Indiana Burns, Mitchell Cleggett, Nicholas Dowling, Liam Fitt, Zachery Hodges, Jack Hourigan, Liam Hutchinson, Tarik Illingworth, Daniel Jokic, Nathan Kreuger, Billy Ludlow, Ryan Mayes, Ryan McCurrach, Connor McNeill, Kane Milford, Thomas Pearsons, Jake Tarca, Billy Wade, Samuel Whitbread, Lachlan Whittlesea.
