= Harry Simpson (disambiguation) =

Harry Simpson (1925–1979) was an American baseball player.

Harry Simpson may also refer to:

- Harry Simpson (Australian footballer) (born 1928), Australian rules footballer for South Melbourne
- Harry Simpson (English footballer) (1875–?), English footballer for Crewe Alexandra and Stoke
- Harry Simpson (footballer, born 1869), Scottish footballer for Stoke
- Harry Simpson (footballer, born 1888) (1888–1951), Scottish footballer
- Harry Simpson (golfer) (1885–1955), English professional golfer
- Harry Simpson (politician) (1886–1967), municipal politician in East York, Ontario, Canada

== See also ==
- Henry Simpson (disambiguation)
- Harold Simpson (disambiguation)
