= Henry Sampson =

Henry Sampson may refer to:

- Henry Sampson (English cricketer) (1813–1885), English cricketer
- Henry Sampson (newspaper proprietor) (1841–1891), English newspaper proprietor
- Henry Sampson (New Zealand cricketer) (1947–1999), New Zealand cricketer
- Henry Sampson (physician) (1629–1700), English nonconformist minister and physician
- Henry Sampson (provost), Provost of Oriel College, Oxford, 1449–1476
- Henry Sampson Woodfall (1739–1805), British printer and journalist
- Henry T. Sampson (1934–2015), American engineer, inventor, and film historian
- Henry William Sampson (1872–1938), English-born South African politician and trade unionist

== See also ==
- Henry Samson (ca. 1603–1685), English passenger on the Mayflower
- Henry Simpson (disambiguation)
