= Victor Harbor Football Club =

Victor Harbor

Names
- Full name: Victor Harbor Football Club
- Nickname: Kangaroos
- Club song: "It's a grand old flag"

Club details
- Founded: 1885; 141 years ago
- Colours
- Competition: GSFL
- Owners: Craig Hirche
- President: Peter Hooper
- Premierships: GSFA (13): 1923, 1924, 1926, 1928, 1930, 1934, 1946, 1947, 1948, 1949, 1950, 1951, 1952; GSFL (12): 1955, 1957, 1972, 1990, 1991, 1992, 1993, 1994, 1995, 1997, 1999, 2025
- Ground: Victor Harbor Oval

Uniforms
Home

The Victor Harbor Football Club, nicknamed the Kangaroos, is an Australian rules football club affiliated with the Great Southern Football League and is based in the coastal town of Victor Harbor, South Australia.

== History ==
The club was founded in 1885 as a founding member of the Great Southern Football Association in 1923, along with Encounter Bay, Goolwa, Hindmarsh Valley and Port Elliot. The club has won 24 senior premierships, the first of which being the inaugural Great Southern Football Association of 1923, a 9.11(65) to 2.4(16) victory over Port Elliot. The club then went on to win another three grand finals during the 1920s until Port Elliot beat them in the 1929 grand final.

Victor Harbour won two more grand finals in 1930 and 1934 but lost the grand finals of 1931, 1935, 1936 and 1937. The club's two premiership successes of 1930 and 1934 saw the victories over Strathalbyn and Port Elliot. The Great Southern Football League then went into recess in 1941 to 1945 due to World War II and the post-war season of 1946 saw Victor Harbour embark on a premiership streak, winning each flag from 1946 to 1952, beating Encounter Bay in each decider from 1946-1950, Goolwa in 1951 and Yankalilla in 1952. 1953 and 1954 saw some unfortunate grand final losses to Goolwa and Mount Compass but another two premierships were won in 1955, a 22-point victory over Yankalilla and a 7-point win over Encounter Bay in 1957.

The 1940s/1950s premiership successes saw the club's longest premiership drought, not winning another flag until 1972, 15 years since their last grand final victory. During that time the Kangaroos made the decider on five occasions but ultimately lost every time, one of those including the 1975 premiership, in which Goolwa comfortably took the flag. That drought was broken when another drought came that lasted for 18 years when the Roos' next premiership was 1990. After the 1990 grand final, the Kangaroos went on to win each grand final from 1991 to 1995, gaining another winning streak. They won the 1997 grand final also and their most recent premiership was in 1999, beating Langhorne Creek 10.5(65) to 6.11(47). The reserves side also won the 1999 premiership flag with a win over Yankalilla.

Since the 2000s, the Kangaroos have performed quite strongly, making the finals in 2009, 2010, 2011, 2013 and 2015 but 2014 saw a rather large downfall, finishing second-last and winning 5 games over the winless Yankalilla.

The Victor Harbor FC still continues to field teams in Seniors and Juniors in the Great Southern Football League.

== A-Grade Premierships ==
- Great Southern Football Association (13): 1923, 1924, 1926, 1928, 1930, 1934, 1946, 1947, 1948, 1949, 1950, 1951, 1952
- Great Southern Football League (12): 1955, 1957, 1972, 1990, 1991, 1992, 1993, 1994, 1995, 1997, 1999, 2025
