= James Sampson =

James Sampson may refer to:

- James Sampson (physician) (1789–1861), Irish-born physician and politician in Upper Canada
- Jum Sampson (c. 1876–?), Australian rugby player
