= Harold Simpson =

Harold Simpson may refer to:

- Bullet Joe Simpson (Harold Edward Joseph Simpson, 1893–1973), Canadian ice hockey defenceman
- Hack Simpson (Harold Alfred Simpson, 1910–1978), Canadian ice hockey player
- Harold Simpson (cricketer) (1879–1924), English cricketer
- Harold Simpson, songwriter, see List of compositions by Eric Coates
- Harold Simpson, writer of Spy of Napoleon
- Harold D. Simpson (1926–2001), former member of the Nebraska Public Service Commission and Nebraska Legislature

== See also ==
- Harry Simpson (disambiguation)
- Harold Fraser-Simson (1872–1944), English composer of light music
