= Langhorne Creek Football Club =

Australian rules football club

Langhorne Creek

Names
- Full name: Langhorne Creek Football Club
- Nickname: Hawks

Club details
- Founded: 1906; 120 years ago
- Colours
- Competition: Great Southern Football League
- President: Jess Chandler
- Coach: James Sellar
- Captain: Matt Dominish
- Premierships: 1933, 1948, 1949, 1951, 1960, 1962, 1975, 1976, 1977, 1978, 2001, 2002, 2011, 2012, 2018, 2019, 2020
- Ground: Langhorne Creek Memorial Park

Uniforms
Home

Other information
- Official website: https://www.langhornecreekfc.com/

Langhorne Creek Football Club is an Australian rules football club based in Langhorne Creek, South Australia that currently competes in the Great Southern Football League. The club plays its home games at Langhorne Creek Memorial Park which is located at Murray Road, Langhorne Creek.

== History ==
The Langhorne Creek Football Club's first recorded match was against Milang in 1906 and during those early years would play one-off matches against teams from neighbouring towns. The club began playing more official matches when it joined the Alexandra Football Association in 1922 however this competition disbanded in 1924. Langhorne Creek joined the B Grade competition of the Hills Central Football Association in 1932 and lost the grand final to Milang in this first season before winning the club's first premiership the following season, once again against Milang. Langhorne Creek joined the Hills Football League when it was established in 1967. For the majority of the club's time competing in the HFL, they were known as the Tigers and wore black and gold. After winning three consecutive A Grade premierships in the Hills Football League between 1975 and 1977, the club joined the Great Southern Football League and became the Hawks. The switch to the GSFL saw the club enjoy immediate success, winning the 1978 GSFL grand final to make it four premierships in a row. The club endured a 23-year premiership drought until they achieved success once again in 2001. Since that time, Langhorne Creek have won seven premierships. They were back-to-back premiers in 2001/2002, 2011/2012 and most recently a three-peat in 2018/2019/2020.

== Premierships ==
A Grade - 1933, 1948, 1949, 1951, 1960, 1962, 1975, 1976, 1977, 1978, 2001, 2002, 2011, 2012, 2018, 2019, 2020

Reserve Grade - 1976, 1998, 2006, 2020

Senior Colts - 1962, 1972, 1975, 1986, 1987, 2000, 2001, 2005

Junior Colts - 1973, 1974, 1975, 2016

Mini Colts - 1978, 1994, 2006

== Mail Medallists ==
A Grade

1950 - Ian Dodd

1951 - Leo Hayes

1962 - Ken Follett

1964 - Ken Follett

1983 - Dennis Elliott

1988 - Kym Warren

2000 - Luen Credlin

2001 - Brett Heinrich

2006 - Randall Follett

2008 - Randall Follett

2009 - Ben Moore

Reserve Grade

1976 - Trevor Hull

1993 - Geoff Warren

1994 - Mark Chandler

1995 - Mike Perrey

1996 - Darren Hull

2000 - Rob Clark

2005 - Tim Footner

2007 - Jake Miller

2008 - Ant Tonkin

2009 - Rory Nixon

2015 - Rob Lyon

2025 - Jaspa Tonkin

Senior Colts

1962 - Bill Tonkin

1969 - Ian Tonkin

1970 - Geoff Warren

1980 - Robbie Potts

1986 - Phil Chandler

1988 - John O'Driscoll

1992 - Craig Scutchings

1994 - Russell Scutchings

2015 - Jedd Rothe

2020 - Mitchell Felton

Junior Colts

1980 - Grantley Hull

2002 - Felipe Hill

2017 - Matthew Roberts

== Honour Roll ==
Season	President	Secretary	Treasurer	A Grade Coach	A Grade Captain	A Grade B&F	A Grade Leading Goalkicker	A Grade Finishing Position	Reserve Grade B&F	Senior Colts B&F	Junior Colts B&F
1906					A Clifford						
1914	A.T. Dowding	Ivan Dowding			E Nancarrow						
1922		Charlie Clifford		Henry Eckert				2nd			
1923		Charlie Clifford		J Bray	J Bray						
1932		Lionel Leslie		Jack Lane				2nd			
1933	Percy Dodd	Lionel Leslie		Jack Lane	Jack Lane			Premiers			
1935		Lionel Leslie		Peter Cleggett				5th			
1947		E Truscott		Ian Dodd		Ian Dodd					
1948		E Truscott		Ian Dodd				Premiers			
1949		E Truscott		Ian Dodd	Ian Dodd	Ian Dodd		Premiers			
1950	Eric Howard	Denys Potts	Ian Dodd	Harold Richards		Ian Dodd		3rd			
1951	Eric Howard	Ron Nurse	Ian Dodd	Leo Hayes		Leo Hayes		Premiers			
1955	Murray Johnson	Harold Richards / J Penny		Alan East		Ian Dodd		4th			
1956	Murray Johnson	Noel Craig		Alan East				4th			
1957	Murray Johnson	Noel Craig		Harold Richards	Ian Chandler						
1958	Murray Johnson	Noel Craig	Richard Martin	Bill Humphrey				2nd			
1959	Murray Johnson	D Fowler	Noel Craig	Ian Chandler	Ian Chandler						
1960	Murray Johnson	Les Webber	Noel Craig	Len Tucker	Ian Chandler	Noel Craig		Premiers			
1961	Murray Johnson	Les Webber	Noel Craig	Ian Chandler				2nd			
1962	Murray Johnson	Les Webber	Noel Craig	Ken Follett	Ken Follett	Ken Follett	Ken Follett	Premiers			
1963	Murray Johnson	Len Tucker	Les Webber	Ken Follett							
1964	Murray Johnson	Len Tucker		Noel Craig							
1965	Murray Johnson	Len Tucker		Ken Follett				2nd			
1966	Murray Johnson	Neville Collins		Jimmy Rose	Bill Scutchings						
1967	Murray Johnson	Neville Collins		Jim Rose				7th			
1968	Murray Johnson	Robert Giles		Clarrie Zadow				8th			
1969	Murray Johnson	Robert Giles		Clarrie Zadow				7th			
1970	Murray Johnson	Robert Giles		Warren Mills				7th			
1971	Murray Johnson	Robert Giles / Jamie Warren	Kevin Dodd	Ken Follett			Edward Adamczak (43)	6th			
1972	Murray Johnson	Ted Milne / Ian Tonkin	Kevin Dodd	Ken Follett		Ian Tonkin	Edward Adamczak & Graham Edwards (30)	6th		Paul Tucker	Michael Perrey
1973	Murray Johnson	John Bradford	Ian Tonkin	Ken Follett	Ken Follett	Russell Edwards	Greg Cotton (41)	4th	Mac Cleggett	Paul Tucker	Michael Perrey
1974	Murray Johnson	John Bradford	Ian Tonkin	Warren Mills		Ken Follett	Greg Cotton (55)	4th	Neville Donhardt	Joe Borrett & Kym Warren	John Freschi
1975	Murray Johnson	John Bradford	Geoff Warren	Warren Mills	Warren Mills	Jamie Warren	Greg Cotton (109)	Premiers	Trevor Hull	Kym Warren	Mark Chandler
1976	Murray Johnson	Terry Yates / Ted Milne	Geoff Warren	Warren Mills	Warren Mills	Jamie Warren	Greg Cotton (124)	Premiers	Graham Edwards		
1977	Murray Johnson	Geoff Warren	David LeBrun	Ian Roberts	Ian Roberts	Mark Williams	Greg Cotton (120)	Premiers			
1978	Murray Johnson	Geoff Warren / Bill Tonkin	David LeBrun	Ian Roberts	Ian Roberts	Ian Roberts	Greg Cotton (115)	Premiers		Mark Chandler	
1979	Murray Johnson	Geoff Warren / Bill Tonkin	David LeBrun	Ian Roberts		Geoff Warren	Robert Cook (76)	7th	Kevin Fischer	Robbie Potts	Grantley Hull
1980	Murray Johnson	Geoff Warren / Paul Tucker	David LeBrun / Janet LeBrun	Dennis Elliott	Dennis Elliott	Ian Roberts	Robert Cook (133)	3rd	Chris Martin	Robbie Potts	Grantley Hull
1981	Murray Johnson	Geoff Warren / Paul Tucker	Janet LeBrun	Dennis Elliott	Dennis Elliott	Dennis Elliott	Robert Cook (120)	4th		Gavin Correll	
1982	Murray Johnson	Paul Tucker / Bill Tonkin	Robert Truelove	Dennis Elliott	Dennis Elliott	Dennis Elliott	Robert Cook (55)	6th	Chris Eckert		
1983	Murray Johnson	Robert Truelove	Janet LeBrun / Helen Cromwell	Dennis Elliott	Dennis Elliott	Dennis Elliott	Robert Cook (110)	6th	Joe Borrett		
1984	Murray Johnson	Barbara Nicholls	Helen Cromwell	Dennis Elliott	Dennis Elliott	Ally Wray	Ally Wray (66)	4th	Joe Borrett		
1985	Murray Johnson	Barbara Nicholls	Helen Cromwell	Phil Heinrich	Michael Potts	Kym Warren	Ally Wray (59)	2nd	Mark Eckert		
1986	Murray Johnson	Barbara Nicholls	Helen Cromwell	Phil Heinrich	Phil Heinrich	Dennis Elliott	Ally Wray (37)	9th	Steve Scott	Phil Chandler	John O'Driscoll
1987	Murray Johnson	Barbara Nicholls	Helen Cromwell	Phil Heinrich	Phil Heinrich	Dennis Elliott	Ally Wray (61)	5th	Neil Westley	Darren Hull	
1988	Murray Johnson	Sue Phillips	Helen Cromwell	Phil Heinrich	Phil Heinrich	Kym Warren	Ally Wray (59)	4th	Tony Sorrell	John O'Driscoll	
1989	Murray Johnson	Sue Phillips	Sue Phillips	Mark Symonds	Mark Symonds	Mike Perrey	Mark Symonds (75)	7th	Brian Johnson	Randall Follett	Craig Scutchings
1990	Murray Johnson	Sue Phillips	Sue Phillips	Mark Symonds	Mark Symonds	Randall Follett	Mark Symonds (57)	6th	Gavin Correll	Brent Mayes	
1991	Murray Johnson	Sue Phillips	Sue Phillips	Mark Symonds	Mark Symonds	Randall Follett	Mark Symonds (62)	6th	Jamie Birchmore	Craig Scutchings	Ant Tonkin
1992	Murray Johnson	Len Tucker	Sue Phillips	Peter Heinrich	Steve Michelmore	Peter Heinrich	Roger Follett (28)	9th		Craig Scutchings	Ant Tonkin
1993	Murray Johnson	Len Tucker	Sue Phillips	Peter Heinrich	Rob Clark	Peter Heinrich	Rob Clark (34)	8th	Phil Chandler	Lachlan Milne	
1994	Murray Johnson	Sue Phillips	Sue Phillips	Al Schenscher	Rob Clark	Tim Follett	Tim Follett (35)	5th	Mark Chandler	Russell Scutchings	Braden Tonkin
1995	Murray Johnson	Michael Perrey	Sue Phillips	Chris Pelle	Randall Follett	Randall Follett	Tim Follett (39)	9th	Mike Perrey	Jonathan Browning	Ben Warren
1996	Murray Johnson	Michael Perrey	Sue Phillips	Darren Sicheri	Randall Follett	Chris Griffiths	Darren Sicheri (42)	9th	Josh Milne	Braden Tonkin	Ben Puiatti
1997	Murray Johnson	Michael Perrey	Sue Phillips	Darren Sicheri	Randall Follett	Randall Follett	Tim Follett (66)	5th	Neil Johnson	Ben Warren	Nick Warren
1998	Murray Johnson	Rebecca Loman / Marie Milne	Cheryl Pridham	Phil Heinrich	Randall Follett	Randall Follett	Tim Follett (58)	4th	Rob Clark	Ben Warren	Josh Nurse
1999	Mark O'Connor	Marie Milne	Dianne Follett	Ian Cox	Randall Follett	Randall Follett	Clint Godwin (134)	2nd	Rob Clark	Ben Warren	Josh Nurse
2000	Mark O'Connor	Marie Milne	Dianne Follett / Sue Phillips	Ian Cox	Randall Follett	Luen Credlin	Clint Godwin (84)	3rd	Rob Clark	Nick Warren & Brad McHughes	Jason Puiatti
2001	Mark O'Connor	Lee-Anne Rothe	Sue Phillips	Shayne Mitchell	Randall Follett	Brett Mannion	Clint Godwin (74)	Premiers	Ant Tonkin	Jason Puiatti	Felipe Hill
2002	Mark O'Connor	Lee-Anne Rothe	Sue Phillips	Shayne Mitchell	Randall Follett	Matt James	Tim Follett (63)	Premiers	Nathan Bradford	James Tonkin	Shane Rothe
2003	Gordon Tonkin	Deb Eckert	Sue Phillips	Steve Green	Randall Follett & Matt James	Brett Mannion	Tim Follett (24)	6th		Shane Rothe	Rory Nixon
2004	Gordon Tonkin	Deb Eckert	Sue Phillips	Steve Green	Nick Warren & Tim Follett	Randall Follett	Clint Godwin (52)	2nd	Mark Dominish	Shane Rothe	Matt Tonkin
2005	Gordon Tonkin	Deb Eckert	Deb Eckert	Steve Green	Nick Warren	Matt James	Tim Follett (37)	7th	Tim Footner	Shane Rothe	Chad Rothe
2006	Gordon Tonkin	Deb Eckert	Deb Eckert	Michael Simmons	Nick Warren	Randall Follett	Tim Follett (93)	2nd	Rowan Marsden	Brendan Saunders	Stanley Long
2007	Gordon Tonkin	Deb Eckert	Deb Eckert	Michael Simmons	Nick Warren	Matt James	Josh King (57)	2nd	Jake Miller	Stanley Long	Jake Ashton-Place
2008	Gordon Tonkin	Deb Eckert	Deb Eckert	Michael Simmons	Nick Warren	Nick Warren	Tim Follett (46)	3rd	Ant Tonkin	Tom Johnson	Riley Mattner
2009	Roger Follett	Rachel van Dijk	Deb Eckert	Michael Simmons	Matt Footner	Felipe Hill	Ben Moore (55)	3rd	Simon Grosvenor	Jake Ashton-Place	Riley Mattner
2010	Roger Follett	Rachel van Dijk	Dionne Follett	Paul Sherwood	Damien James	Paul Sherwood	Loccy McGregor (56)	5th	Tim Footner	Jake Ashton-Place	Nick Lawrie
2011	Roger Follett	Rachel van Dijk	Dionne Follett	Anthony Murgatroyd	Ben Warren	Jarrod Kellock	Ben Warren (94)	Premiers	Rob Lyon	Brodie Mortensen	Daniel Cleggett
2012	Roger Follett	Rachel van Dijk	Dionne Follett	Anthony Murgatroyd	Nick Warren	Jarrod Kellock	Jarrod Kellock (42)	Premiers	Dennis Raymond	Riley Mattner	Jedd Rothe
2013	Roger Follett	Rachel van Dijk	Kristy James	Anthony Murgatroyd	Nick Warren	Jarrod Kellock	Tom Derham (38)	4th	Brad McHughes	Nathan Beer	Jake Dominish
2014	Roger Follett	Rachel van Dijk	Elspeth Dover	Ben Moore	Curtis Perrey	Jarrod Kellock	Tynan Keeley (35)	3rd	Brad McHughes	Brayden Frost	Zac Stacey
2015	Roger Follett	Rachel van Dijk	Elspeth Dover	Ben Moore	Curtis Perrey	Curtis Perrey	Tynan Keeley (56)	7th	Brad McHughes	Jake Dominish	Noah Harrison
2016	Roger Follett	Vanessa James	Vanessa James	Angus Lally	Curtis Perrey	Shaun Tapp	Caleb Howell (31)	9th	Gavin McHughes	Jake Dominish	Noah Harrison
2017	Matt James	Vanessa James	Vanessa James	Clint Godwin	Curtis Perrey	Tom Derham & Jarrod Kellock	Caleb Howell (41)	4th	Brad McHughes	Shannon Jones	Matthew Roberts
2018	Matt James	Vanessa James	Vanessa James	Clint Godwin	Curtis Perrey	Jarrod Kellock	Jarrod Kellock (63)	Premiers	Alex Lyon	Mason Peglar	Matthew Roberts
2019	Matt James	Vanessa James	Luke Cooper	Clint Godwin	Curtis Perrey	James Sellar	Jarrod Kellock (46)	Premiers	Kent Cooper	Noah Harrison	Adam Towk
2020	Rob Lyon & Ben Moore	Beck Burgess	Shannon Granger	James Sellar	Curtis Perrey	James Sellar	Coby Helyar (28)	Premiers	Kent Cooper & Tyler Follett	Mitchell Felton	Ashton Hoffman
2021	Ben Moore	Beck Burgess	Shannon Granger	James Sellar	Curtis Perrey	Jarrod Kellock	Caleb Howell (43)	2nd	Jordan Jones	Jack Hall	Sam McKenzie
2022	Jess Chandler & Greg Follett	Beck Burgess	Shannon Granger	Curtis Perrey	Matt Dominish	Matt Dominish	Coby Helyar (47)	4th	Tyler Follett	Adam Towk	Anthony Campbell-Kartinyeri
2023	Jess Chandler & Greg Follett	Beck Burgess	Shannon Granger	Curtis Perrey	Matt Dominish	Jarrod Kellock	Darcy Clifford (29)	6th	Brayden Frost	Sam McKenzie	Griffin James
2024	Jess Chandler	Sara O’Dea	Shannon Granger	Peter Galbraith	Matt Dominish	Tom Derham & Matt Dominish	Caleb Howell (43)	5th	Cameron Bates	Sam McKenzie	Josh Collins
2025	Jess Chandler	Chanelle Miller	Shannon Granger	Brock Gifford	Matt Dominish	Henry Bruce	Jarrod Kellock (47)	6th	Jaspa Tonkin	Lincoln James	Josh Collins
2026	Jess Chandler	Chanelle Miller	Shannon Granger	James Sellar	Matt Dominish	Henry Bruce	Caleb Howell (27)	3rd	Jaspa Tonkin	Aiden Sanders	Evan Sanders & Robbie Van der Zwaag
2027				James Sellar							

== Most Senior Games ==
Name	A Grade	Reserve Grade	Total Senior Games	Period
Geoff Warren	369	88	457	1969-1998
Tim Follett	345	87	432	1989-2017
Damien James	324	91	415	1999-2022
Mark Chandler	205	174	379	1975-2004
Randall Follett	360	10	370	1990-2016
Nathan James	193	161	354	1996-2016
Gavin McHughes	143	203	346	1999-2022
Steve Michelmore	270	75	345	1986-2008
Phil Rodgers	179	202	341	1986-2005
Rob Clark	244	84	328	1982-2001
Robbie Potts	147	178	325	1978-2001
Joe Hill	16	298	314	1999-2020
Neil Westley	10	300	310	1980-2001
Chris Dodd	193	115	308	1982-2003
Brendan Saunders	290	17	307	2004-2026

== Leading A Grade Goal Kickers ==
Name	Goals	Games
Tim Follett	841	345
Robert Cook	641	130
Greg Cotton	603	151
Randall Follett	425	360
Caleb Howell	417	198
Jarrod Kellock	412	228
Michael Potts	358	177
Clint Godwin	344	93
Ken Follett	314	211
Ally Wray	308	184
Geoff Warren	287	369
Ben Warren	257	93
Ben McLeod	250	150
Loccy McGregor	238	89
Rob Clark	231	244
Mitchell Cleggett	223	164
Mark Symonds	194	54

== Life Members ==
Year	Name
1966	Percy Dodd
1966	Louis Wenzel
1966	Henry Eckert
1976	Charlie Clifford
1976	Murray Johnson
1982	Ken Follett
1982	Robert Giles
1982	Geoff Warren
1984	Len Tucker
1984	Tony Cleggett
1987	Bill Tonkin
1988	Ian Dodd
1988	Rick Eckert
1988	Paul Tucker
1992	Stephen Chandler
1993	Mark Chandler
1995	Chris Dodd
1995	Robbie Potts
1995	Neil Westley
1996	John Loman
1996	Rob Clark
1999	Phil Rodgers
2002	Rob Rodgers
2002	Steve Michelmore
2004	Sue Phillips
2004	Randall Follett
2005	Brett Phillips
2005	Tim Follett
2007	Brett Cleggett
2009	Marlene Follett
2009	Nathan James
2013	Damien James
2013	Joe Hill
2014	Roger Follett
2015	Gavin McHughes
2017	Ant Tonkin
2018	Nick Warren
2018	Grant "Elroy" Westley
2019	Brendan Saunders
2019	Brad McHughes
2020	Gordon Tonkin
2020	Matt James
2021	Jarrod Kellock
2021	Don Phillips
2022	Mike Perrey
2024	Mark Cleggett
2024	Michael Potts
2024	Trevor Potts
2026	Matt Tonkin

== Notable former players ==
Matthew Roberts became the first Langhorne Creek player to be drafted to the AFL when he was selected by the Sydney Swans with pick 34 in the 2021 AFL draft. He made his AFL debut for the Swans on 27 May 2022 in their Round 11 match against Richmond at the SCG. Matt was a talented junior player for Langhorne Creek and played in the club's 2018 GSFL A Grade Grand Final win at just 15 years of age.

Paralympian and world record holder Michael Roeger played junior football for Langhorne Creek from the late 1990s through to 2005. His final match for the club before leaving the game to focus on athletics was the 2005 Senior Colts grand final win. Despite living in Canberra where he has a scholarship with the Australian Institute of Sport, Roeger remains a passionate supporter of the Hawks.

Grant Bartholamaeus started his junior football for Langhorne Creek before his family moved to Forbes, NSW when he was 12 years old. He later went on to play VFL football for the Sydney Swans. He played 4 league matches for the Swans from 1986 to 1987.

Ben Warren played junior football for Langhorne Creek from the late 1980s through to 1999 before a season of A Grade football for the Hawks in 2000. He joined South Adelaide Football Club in 2001 and went on to play 163 league games for the Panthers and kick 345 goals from 2001 to 2010. Warren returned to Langhorne Creek in 2011 to captain the Hawks to an A Grade premiership. In 2012 he joined Norwood Football Club and played two seasons for the Redlegs and won back-to-back SANFL premierships before announcing his retirement. He was appointed coach of Norwood ahead of the 2014 season and guided the Redlegs to their third straight premiership in his debut season as coach. Warren remained coach until the end of the 2016 season. Following his time at Norwood, Warren returned to Langhorne Creek as a player and was a member of the 2018 premiership team.
