= Ian Perrie =

Australian rules footballer (born 1979)

Personal information
- Full name: Ian Perrie
- Nickname: Sarge
- Born: 9 April 1979 (age 47); Zimbabwe
- Original team: East Perth
- Debut: Round 13, 1998, Adelaide vs. Collingwood, at MCG
- Height: 193 cm (6 ft 4 in)
- Weight: 100 kg (220 lb)

Playing career^{1}
Years	Club	Games (Goals)
1998–2007	Adelaide	116 (129)
- ^{1} Playing statistics correct to the end of 2007.

Career highlights
- 14 career Brownlow Medal votes; 2000 AFL Rising Star nomination

Ian Perrie (born 9 April 1979, in Zimbabwe) is an Australian rules footballer who played for the Adelaide Crows in the Australian Football League.

== Career ==
After being drafted at pick number 49 in the 1997 AFL draft, Perrie debuted for Adelaide in Round 13, 1998. In his early years, inaccurate kicking was his most troubled area, kicking 24.27 in his first two years. He was admired for his relentless effort which, coupled with his unorthodox kicking style. He was nominated for the AFL's 2000 AFL Rising Star award.

In 2003, under the tutelage of an ageing recruit in Wayne Carey, Perrie scored an improved 26 goals, 16 behinds. He was an important member of Adelaide's McClelland Trophy-winning team in 2005, kicking a career-best 39 goals, with 31 behinds. In the 2006 season, he produced four good performances to start the season, including 13 marks, 16 disposals and 3 goals in Round 1, but in a Round 4 clash with Fremantle's Luke McPharlin he injured and hyperextended his knee and tore his PCL requiring a knee reconstruction. He returned to the side late in the season and in the Qualifying Final vs Fremantle at AAMI Stadium, kicking a crucial goal late in the final quarter to help seal a come from behind win.

Perrie was sidelined with a shoulder injury for six weeks in 2007. He was delisted at the end of the 2007 season.

In 2008, Perrie played for Sturt in the SANFL, and was named in South Australia's state league team.

From 2009–11, Perrie played for the Pulteney Old Scholars Football Club. In 2012–13, he played for Encounter Bay Football Club in the Great Southern Football League, winning the league's best-and-fairest award in 2013 in a premiership year for the Bays. In 2014, he was recruited to play for Padthaway in the KNTFL.
