= Greg Whittlesea =

Australian rules footballer

Personal information
- Born: 23 July 1963 (age 63)
- Draft: No. 56, 1986 national draft
- Height: 183 cm (6 ft 0 in)
- Weight: 86 kg (190 lb)

Playing career
Years	Club	Games (Goals)
1981–1990	Sturt	234 (88)
1991	Hawthorn	4 (0)
1993–1994	Glenelg	17 (1)
Total		255 (89)

Representative team honours
Years	Team	Games (Goals)
- South Australia

Career highlights
- Magarey Medal 1988; Sturt captain 1987–1990; Sturt best and fairest 1987, 1988; All-Australian team 1988

Gregory Whittlesea (born 23 July 1963) is a former Australian rules footballer who played with Hawthorn in the Australian Football League (AFL) and with Sturt and Glenelg in the South Australian National Football League (SANFL) during the 1980s and 1990s.

Whittlesea captained Sturt from 1987 to 1990 and won the Magarey Medal in 1988. He won successive best and fairest awards in 1987 and 1988. At the 1988 Adelaide Bicentennial Carnival he represented South Australia and earned All-Australian selection. In 1991 he was recruited by Hawthorn, but managed only four games.

He retired from football in 2004 having played 168 games for Yankalilla in the Great Southern Football League in South Australia.
