= Encounter Bay Football Club =

Encounter Bay

Names
- Full name: Encounter Bay Football Club
- Nickname(s): Eagles

Club details
- Founded: 1921; 104 years ago
- Colours
- Competition: GSFL
- Premierships: (10): 1940, 1958, 1960, 1961, 1965, 1967, 1989, 1996, 2013, 2015
- Ground(s): Encounter Bay Oval

Uniforms
Home

The Encounter Bay Football Club, nicknamed the Eagles, is an Australian rules football club based in Encounter Bay, South Australia, that plays in the Great Southern Football League.

== Club history ==
Australian rules football on the Fleurieu Peninsula dates back to the 1860s–1870s, when the Goolwa Football Club was established in 1878. Matches were organised between local towns on a 'friendly' basis. Following this period, it was thought that a stable league should be created to oversee the competition. That league was named The Great Southern Football League; Encounter Bay joined the league two years after the club's founding, in 1921.

In Encounter Bay's first few years of existence, the team was made primarily of players from the Victor Harbor area. The club's first match was against Victor Harbor, and they also played games against Hindmarsh Valley and Finniss. The club first saw premiership glory in 1940, captained by local legend Frank Joy, beating Port Elliot 10.15.75 to 7.5.47, playing home games at a paddock off Maude Street in Encounter Bay.

Originally, Encounter Bay's colours were red and white; the current yellow and blue was the result of a split in 1946. After World War II, there was a large number of players who couldn't get a game. With support from the local areas of Back Valley, Lower Inman, and Inman Valley, they formed a breakaway football club – the Valleys Football Club. The Valleys FC played their home games at the Back Valley Oval, next to the Back Valley Tennis Club, but by 1953, the club was finding it difficult to win games and so they re-amalgamated with Encounter Bay to form the Bay Valley Rovers.

The new team had the blue and gold colours of the former Valleys FC, and the merger lasted until 1957, when the name was changed to Encounter Bay. The 1958 season saw the change from a gold sash to the eagle that is still worn on the guernsey, and the Eagles won the A- and B-Grade premiership that same year. The club dominated the decade of the 1960s by making numerous grand finals and winning in 1960, 1961, 1965, and 1967. Encounter Bay saw a twenty-two-year premiership drought until 1989, when the Eagles won the league and reserves flags under Bob Beecroft after being bridesmaids to Willunga the year before; they won again in 1996 under Darren Mansell. The Bays were strong through the 2000s led by Jim west, with Tony Modra putting on some good displays up forward. The club made a number of preliminary and Grand finals without getting over the line. The club has enjoyed recent success winning the league premiership in 2013 under Billy Neely with Scott Welsh having a good year up forward. The Bays won the flag again in 2015 after being runners up in 2014.

The bays have won the GSFL league premiership 10 times and been runners up on 20 occasions, most recently being runners up in 2020. Of note the Encounter Bay Football Club was in 2020 named in the top 12 teams in all competitions in South Australia by sports broadcaster The South Australian Footballer

== Team of the Century ==
In 2021 the Encounter Bay Football Club named a team of the century as part of their centenary celebrations. The team is as follows

BP: Trevor Prior

FB: Ian Millard

BP: Rigby Barnes

HB: David Shegog

CHB: Frank Joy

HB: Reg Masters

W: Don Bartel

C: Lyndon Ellsworthy

W: Peter Millard

HF: Jim West

CHF: Allan Field

HF: Peter Johnston

FP: Robert Beecroft

FF: Tony Modra

FP: David Pearson

1R:Andrew McLean :Tyson Davis-Neale :Marty Fraser

2R:Robert Beecroft :Noel Clark :David Pearson

INT: Jack Roads (Snr), Steven Hann, Craig Littley, Bert Hutton, Greg Brand, Noel Clark, Tony Proud.

CPT: Don Bartel

VC : Peter Millard

DVC : Tyson Davis-Neale

Coach: Doug Tugwell

== Premierships ==
- GSFL (10): 1940, 1958, 1960, 1961, 1965, 1967, 1989, 1996, 2013, 2015

== Individual awards ==
Mail Medallists

- 2015 Rigby Barnes
- 2014 Rigby Barnes
- 2013 Ian Perrie
- 2004 Andrew McLean
- 1990 D Pearsons
- 1986 M Fraser
- 1959 A Field
- 1958 A Field
- 1957 D Bartell
- 1950 N Clark
- 1949 N Clark
- 1940 R Masters
- 1927 L Pearce
- 1926 B Hutton

Argus Medallists

- 2014 Tom Bloomfield
- 2004 Jon Joy
- 1993 P Lihou
