= Clay Sampson =

Australian rules footballer, born 1976

Personal information
- Full name: Clay Sampson
- Born: 24 February 1976 (age 50)
- Original team: South Adelaide (SANFL)
- Draft: 51st overall, 1994 AFL draft
- Height: 178 cm (5 ft 10 in)
- Weight: 83 kg (183 lb)

Playing career^{1}
| Years | Club | Games (Goals) |
| 1995–1996 | Melbourne | 13 (1) |
| 1997–1998 | Adelaide | 24 (16) |
| 1999–2000 | Richmond | 27 (18) |
| Total | | 64 (35) |
- ^{1} Playing statistics correct to the end of 2000.

Career highlights
- AFL Premiership player (1997)

Clay Sampson (born 24 February 1976) is a former Australian rules footballer who played in the Australian Football League (AFL) and the South Australian National Football League (SANFL). Sampson debuted for South Adelaide in 1994 before being drafted and going on to play 64 AFL games at three AFL clubs.

He returned to South Adelaide in 2001, before officially retiring in 2008. He was appointed Assistant Coach at the start of the 2008 season, before being thrust into the head coaching position, when John "Jack" Cahill resigned midway through the season. Sampson was appointed until the end of the 2009 season, finishing with a 4–28 win–loss record.

Sampson now coaches Myponga-Sellicks Football Club in the Great Southern Football League.

== Career ==
- Melbourne: 1995–96, 13 games, 1 goal.
- Adelaide: 1997–98, 24 games, 16 goals.
- Richmond: 1999–2000, 27 games, 18 goals.
- South Adelaide Football Club

== Statistics ==
Legend
| G | Goals | K | Kicks | D | Disposals | T | Tackles |
| B | Behinds | H | Handballs | M | Marks |

| Season | Team | No. | Games | Totals | | | | | | | Averages (per game) | | | | | | |
| Season | Team | No. | Games | G | B | K | H | D | M | T | G | B | K | H | D | M | T |
|---|---|---|---|---|---|---|---|---|---|---|---|---|---|---|---|---|---|
| 1995 | Melbourne | 24 | 5 | 0 | 3 | 11 | 9 | 20 | 4 | 2 | 0.0 | 0.6 | 2.2 | 1.8 | 4.0 | 0.8 | 0.4 |
| 1996 | Melbourne | 24 | 8 | 1 | 1 | 30 | 18 | 48 | 7 | 6 | 0.1 | 0.1 | 3.8 | 2.3 | 6.0 | 0.9 | 0.8 |
| 1997† | Adelaide | 24 | 10 | 5 | 5 | 69 | 25 | 94 | 17 | 17 | 0.5 | 0.5 | 6.9 | 2.5 | 9.4 | 1.7 | 1.7 |
| 1998 | Adelaide | 24 | 14 | 11 | 7 | 89 | 34 | 123 | 18 | 25 | 0.8 | 0.5 | 6.4 | 2.4 | 8.8 | 1.3 | 1.8 |
| 1999 | Richmond | 26 | 17 | 14 | 12 | 137 | 35 | 172 | 35 | 32 | 0.8 | 0.7 | 8.1 | 2.1 | 10.1 | 2.1 | 1.9 |
| 2000 | Richmond | 24 | 10 | 4 | 5 | 54 | 12 | 66 | 11 | 10 | 0.4 | 0.5 | 5.4 | 1.2 | 6.6 | 1.1 | 1.0 |
| Career | | | 64 | 35 | 33 | 390 | 133 | 523 | 92 | 92 | 0.5 | 0.5 | 6.1 | 2.1 | 8.2 | 1.4 | 1.4 |

== Player honours ==
- 1997 Premiership player with Adelaide
- 2003–2006 South Adelaide captain
- 2001 South Adelaide leading goalkicker
