= Gary Sampson =

Gary Sampson may refer to:

- Gary Sampson (ice hockey) (born 1959), retired American ice hockey player
- Gary Lee Sampson (1959–2021), convicted murderer in Massachusetts, United States
- Gary P. Sampson, Australian economist

== See also ==
- Gary Samson (born 1951), American filmmaker and photographer
