= Jill Sampson =

Susan Jill Sampson, MSC of Qualicum Beach, British Columbia, is a Canadian semi-retired veterinarian.

Dr Sampson founded Poco a Poco (Spanish for "little by little") in 1995 to provide medical, surgical and dental relief in Guatemala. Since then, she has organized many expeditions by teams of volunteer doctors, surgeons and dentists to serve the needs of the poorest citizens of that country. She has also arranged many shipments of medical supplies and equipment to Guatemala.

In 2004, she was presented with the Meritorious Service Cross by Governor General Adrienne Clarkson. She was recognized for her "dedication and her exceptional qualities in the area of public relations." She was commended for bringing "honour to her profession and to Canada."

In 2005 Dr Sampson travelled to Sri Lanka to provide medical and housing relief from tsunami damage that followed the 2004 Indian Ocean earthquake.
