= Henry Sampson (New Zealand cricketer) =

New Zealand cricketer

Personal information
- Full name: Henery Charles Sampson
- Born: 1 April 1947; New Plymouth, Taranaki, New Zealand
- Died: 19 July 1999 (aged 52); Gold Coast, Queensland, Australia
- Batting: Left-handed

Domestic team information
- Years: Team
- 1965/66–1972/73: Taranaki
- 1970/71–1972/73: Central Districts
- 1973/74–1975/76: Otago
- 1976/77: Canterbury
- Source: CricInfo, 23 May 2016

Henry Charles Sampson (1 April 1947 – 19 July 1999) was a New Zealand cricketer. He played first-class cricket for Central Districts, Otago and Canterbury between the 1970–71 and 1976–77 seasons.

Sampson was born at New Plymouth in Taranaki in 1947 and educated at New Plymouth Boys' High School in the city. He played Hawke Cup cricket for Taranaki from the 1965–66 season as well as colts and age-group cricket for Central Districts sides, before making his senior debut for Central Districts in December 1970. Opening the batting against Wellington at the Basin Reserve he scored 119 on debut, his only first-class century.

Described by Wisden as playing "a number of handsome innings" during his career, after playing 20 senior matches for Central Districts over three seasons, Sampson moved to play for Otago in 1973–74. He made 25 appearances for the side over another three seasons, before playing his last season in top-level cricket for Canterbury, making two appearances for the side during 1976–77. In total he scored 1,966 first-class runs in 37 matches and 213 List A runs in 10 matches.

Sampson died in Australia in 1999 after suffering from cancer. He was aged 52. Obituaries were published in the 1999 edition of the New Zealand Cricket Almanack and the 2000 edition of Wisden Cricketers' Almanack.
