= Harold Simpson (cricketer) =

English cricketer

Harold Benjamin Simpson (1879–1924) was an English cricketer active from 1898 to 1911 who played for Northamptonshire (Northants). He was born in Higham Ferrers, Northamptonshire on 27 January 1879 and died in Chelveston-cum-Caldecott, Northamptonshire on 16 March 1924. He appeared in eight first-class matches as a righthanded batsman who scored 128 runs with a highest score of 44 and took nine wickets with a best performance of four for 29.
