= Henry Simpson =

Henry Simpson may refer to:

- Henry Simpson (shipping) (1815–1884), merchant and ship owner in South Australia
- Henry Lakin Simpson (1859–1881), United States Navy sailor and Medal of Honor recipient
- Henry Simpson (Toronto) (1864–1926), architect in Toronto, Ontario
- Henry Simpson (Poets' Club founder) (died 1939), banker and the founder and president of the Poets' Club in London
- Henry George Simpson (1822–1898), member of the Queensland Legislative Council

== See also ==
- Harry Simpson (disambiguation)
- Henry Simpson Lunn (1859–1939), English humanitarian and religious figure
- Henry Simpson Newland (1873–1969), Australian surgeon
- Henry Simson (1872–1932), British physician who became obstetrician to the royal family
- Henry L. Stimson (1867–1950), American statesman and lawyer
