= Harry Simpson (Australian footballer) =

Australian rules footballer

Personal information
- Full name: Henry William Simpson
- Born: 2 June 1928
- Died: 20 February 2014 (age 85)
- Original teams: South Melbourne District FC; South District Colts
- Height: 185 cm (6 ft 1 in)
- Weight: 89 kg (196 lb)
- Position: Ruck

Playing career^{1}
Years	Club	Games (Goals)
1948–50	South Melbourne	16 (3)
- ^{1} Playing statistics correct to the end of 1950.

Career highlights
- Williamstown premierships 1954 & 1955; Williamstown best and fairest 1953 & 1954; Runner-up J. J. Liston Trophy 1954; Forward pocket WFC Team of the Century

Henry "Harry" William Simpson (2 June 1928 – 20 February 2014) was an Australian rules footballer who played with South Melbourne in the Victorian Football League (VFL).

Simpson signed with Sandringham in the VFA in 1952 but was persuaded to transfer to Williamstown and played for the VFA Seagulls up until the end of 1955. He played 75 games and kicked 82 goals for Williamstown, which included the 1954 & 1955 premierships. Simpson won the Club best and fairest awards in 1953 and 1954 and was awarded the most serviceable player trophy in 1952. He was runner-up in the Liston Trophy (the VFA best and fairest award) in 1954 and was selected in the forward pocket in the Williamstown Team of the Century.

Simpson went to Dimboola in the Wimmera Football League as captain-coach in 1956.
