= William Sampson =

William Sampson may refer to:

- William Sampson (author) (1959–2012), a Canadian/British citizen arrested and tortured by the Saudi government between 2000 and 2003
- William Sampson (judge), Chief Justice of the Kentucky Supreme Court during the Civil War
- William Sampson (lawyer) (1764–1836), a United Irishmen lawyer exiled to the United States
- William Sampson (playwright) (1590?–1636?), collaborated with Gervase Markham
- William Harkness Sampson, Methodist minister and educator, founder of Lawrence University
- William T. Sampson (1840–1902), American admiral and commander in the Spanish–American War
- William Sampson (politician), American politician serving as a member of the New Jersey General Assembly

== See also ==
- Will Sampson (1933–1987), a Native American actor and artist
