= Harry Simpson (footballer, born 1888) =

Scottish footballer

Personal information
- Full name: Henry Coutts Simpson
- Date of birth: 10 October 1888
- Place of birth: Peterhead, Scotland
- Date of death: 1951 (aged 62–63)
- Position: Inside right

Senior career*
Years	Team	Apps	(Gls)
–1907	Peterhead		
1907–1910	St Bernard's	52	(9)
1910	Leicester Fosse	7	(1)
1910	Raith Rovers	4	(0)
1910–1913	Ayr United	55	(15)
1913–1914	East Stirlingshire	10	(0)
- * Club domestic league appearances and goals

Henry Coutts Simpson (10 October 1888 – 1951) was a Scottish professional footballer who played as an inside right in the Scottish League for Ayr United, St Bernard's, East Stirlingshire and Raith Rovers. He also played in the Football League for Leicester Fosse.

== Personal life ==
Simpson served in the First World War and was wounded at Gallipoli in August 1915.

== Career statistics ==
Appearances and goals by club, season and competition
Club	Season	League			National cup (Note: Includes Scottish Cup, FA Cup)		Total	
Club	Season	Division	Apps	Goals	Apps	Goals	Apps	Goals
St Bernard's	1907–08	Scottish Second Division	10	1	7	0	17	1
St Bernard's	1908–09	Scottish Second Division	21	2	2	0	23	2
St Bernard's	1909–10	Scottish Second Division	21	6	6	2	27	8
St Bernard's	Total		52	9	15	2	67	11
Leicester Fosse	1909–10	Second Division	7	1	—		7	1
Raith Rovers	1910–11	Scottish First Division	4	0	1	0	5	0
Ayr United	1910–11	Scottish Second Division	16	6	—		16	6
Ayr United	1911–12	Scottish Second Division	21	4	8	0	29	4
Ayr United	1912–13	Scottish Second Division	18	5	6	0	24	5
Ayr United	Total		55	15	14	0	69	15
East Stirlingshire	1913–14	Scottish Second Division	10	0	7	0	17	0
Career total			128	25	37	2	165	27
