= Henry Sampson (provost) =

British academic administrator

Henry Sampson was Provost of Oriel College, Oxford, from 1449 to 1476.
