= Mount Compass Football Club =

Australian rules football club

Mount Compass

Names
- Full name: Mount Compass Football Club
- Nickname(s): Bulldogs

Club details
- Founded: 1924; 101 years ago
- Colours
- Competition: GSFL
- President: Paul Zimmerman
- Premierships: (6): 1954, 1959, 1980, 2016, 2017
- Ground(s): Mount Compass Oval

Uniforms
Home

The Mount Compass Football Club (nicknamed Bulldogs) is an Australian rules football club first formed in 1924 and based in Mount Compass, South Australia. The club currently competes in the Great Southern Football League.

Mount Compass initially only played challenge matches until they joined the "Fleurieu Peninsula Football Association" in 1934 but that competition only lasted one season. They went back to playing challenge matches until they joined the Great Southern Football League in 1940.

After World War II, Mount Compass joined the Southern Football Association and played for 7 seasons until transferring to the Great Southern Football League in 1952 where they have remained since.

Mount Compass continue to field Senior and Junior teams in the Great Southern Football League.

== A-Grade Premierships ==
- GSFL (5): 1954, 1959, 1980, 2016, 2017

Former Mount Compass FC logo
