= Ben Moore (footballer) =

Australian rules footballer (born 1977)

Personal information
- Full name: Ben Moore
- Born: 4 July 1977 (age 49)
- Original team: Glenelg
- Draft: No. 46, 1995 National Draft
- Height: 180 cm (5 ft 11 in)
- Weight: 75 kg (165 lb)

Playing career^{1}
Years	Club	Games (Goals)
1996–1999	Richmond	24 (11)
- ^{1} Playing statistics correct to the end of 1999.

Ben Moore (born 4 July 1977) is a former Australian rules footballer who played with Richmond in the Australian Football League (AFL).

Moore, a rover and half forward, started playing for Glenelg in 1995. He was selected by Richmond at pick 46 in the 1995 National Draft and made 24 appearances for the club in four seasons. Moore kicked goals with his first two kicks in AFL football, despite this being his second game (he did not get a kick on debut) In 2000, Moore returned to Glenelg, where he played until 2007 and captained the team in 2004 and 2005. He played for Reynella in 2008 and joined Langhorne Creek the following year.
