= Jum Sampson =

Australia international rugby union player

- Born: James H. Sampson c. 1876
- Occupation: Publican

Rugby union career
- Position: Number 8
Amateur team(s)
Years	Team	Apps	(Points)
1897–98	Parnell (Auckland)		
1899	Glebe (Sydney)		
Provincial / State sides
Years	Team	Apps	(Points)
1898	Auckland	4	
International career
Years	Team	Apps	(Points)
1899	Australia	1	(0)

James H. "Jum" Sampson (born c. 1876) was a New Zealand-born rugby union player who represented Australia.

Sampson, who was thought to have possibly come from Waihi, played as a number 8.

He may have started his career playing in the Waikato between 1893 and 1895. After returning to where he was believed to have originated from, he spent one season in the Ohinemuri area the next year. During 1897 he joined the Parnell club in Auckland where he made the provincial side the following year. He was understood to have moved to Sydney in 1899 where he joined the Glebe (now known as Drummoyne) club.

Sampson claimed 1 international rugby cap for Australia. This was against Great Britain, at Sydney, on 12 August 1899. He never represented New South Wales and did not play any known first-class rugby after 1899.
