= Myponga-Sellicks Football Club =

Myponga-Sellicks

Names
- Full name: Myponga-Sellicks Football Club
- Former name: Myponga Football Club (1946–2002)
- Nickname(s): Mudlarks, muddies

Club details
- Founded: March 25, 1946; 79 years ago
- Colours
- Competition: GSFL
- President: David Hutchinson
- Coach: Justin Richardson
- Premierships: (7): 1953, 1957, 1960, 1974, 1983, 1984, 2024
- Ground: Myponga Oval, Myponga

Uniforms
Home

The Myponga-Sellicks Football Club is an Australian rules football club first formed on 25 March 1946 as the Myponga Football Club. Myponga started in the Southern Football Association that season where it remained until the end of the 1966 season, when they transferred to the Great Southern Football League.

In 2003, Myponga changed its name to the Myponga-Sellicks Football Club to expand its catchment area.

Myponga-Sellicks continue to field Senior and Junior teams in the Great Southern Football League.

== A-Grade Premierships ==
- Southern Football Association A-Grade (3)
  - 1953, 1957, 1960
- Great Southern Football League A-Grade (4)
  - 1974, 1983, 1984, 2024

== Other Achievements ==
In 1953, Myponga won the "Cock of the South" title by, as Southern premiers, beating the Great Southern premiers, Goolwa, to decide the best team in the region.

== Greatest SFL Team ==
To celebrate the 125th anniversary of the Southern Football League, each club was asked to name their "Greatest Team" whilst participating in the SFL.

Myponga Football Club's Greatest SFL Team 1946-1966
B:	Ed Bennett	Bernie Kelly Coach	Peter Whitford
HB:	Rex Corby	John Corby	Joss Pearce
C:	Chris Combe	Peter Hansen	Terry Bennett
HF:	Colin McLaren	Barry Hutchinson	Brian Hutchinson
F:	Malcolm Westley	J. Crowe	Russ Carthy
Foll:	Alwyn (Pop) Faggotter Captain	Don Bishop	Neil Fox
Int:	Lance Faggotter	Bob Broadbent	
Coach:	Bernie Kelly		
