= Great Southern Football League (South Australia) =

Australian rules football league in South Australia

- Sport: Australian rules football
- Founded: 1923; 103 years ago
- No. of teams: 10
- Country: Australia
- Most recent champion: McLaren (4) (2026)
- Most titles: Victor Harbor (25 premierships)
- Related competitions: SANFL

The Great Southern Football League (GSFL) is an Australian rules football competition based in the Fleurieu Peninsula region of South Australia, Australia. It is an affiliated member of the South Australian National Football League and is zoned to the South Adelaide Football Club.

== History ==
Although football was played in the area in the 1870s, with the Goolwa club dating themselves from 1878, it was not until 1923 that the Great Southern Football Association was formed. The founding clubs were Encounter Bay, Goolwa, Hindmarsh Valley, Port Elliot and Victor Harbour.

Since that time a number of clubs have formed part of the association, which itself changed its name to the Great Southern Football League. Current member clubs include Willunga, which is one of the oldest football clubs in South Australia, tracing its history back to 1874.

== Clubs ==
=== Locations ===
Locations of the Great Southern FL clubs

=== Current ===
Club	Colours	Nickname	Home Ground	Former League	Est.	Years in GSFL	GSFL Senior Premierships	
Club	Colours	Nickname	Home Ground	Former League	Est.	Years in GSFL	Total	Years
Encounter Bay (Bay Valley Rovers 1954-56)		Eagles	Encounter Bay Recreation Reserve, Encounter Bay	–	1954	1954-	10	1956, 1958, 1960, 1961, 1965, 1967, 1989, 1996, 2013, 2015
Goolwa/Port Elliot		Magpies	Goolwa Oval, Goolwa	–	2001	2001-	0	-
Langhorne Creek		Hawks	Langhorne Creek Oval, Langhorne Creek	HFL	1906	1978-	8	1978, 2001, 2002, 2011, 2012, 2018, 2019, 2020
McLaren Districts		Eagles	McLaren Vale Sporting Complex, McLaren Vale	SFL	1998	2000-	4	2003, 2022, 2023, 2026
Mount Compass		Bulldogs	Mount Compass Oval, Mount Compass	SFL	1924	1953-	5	1954, 1959, 1980, 2016, 2017
Myponga-Sellicks		Mudlarks	Myponga Oval, Myponga	SFL	1946	1967-	4	1974, 1983, 1984, 2024
Strathalbyn		Roosters	Strathalbyn Oval, Strathalbyn	HCFA	1879	1930, 1963-	11	1963, 1964, 1966, 1968, 1971, 1979, 1981, 1982, 1987, 2000, 2010, 2014
Victor Harbor		Kangaroos	Victor Harbor Oval, Victor Harbor	–	1885	1923-	25	1923, 1924, 1926, 1928, 1930, 1934, 1946, 1947, 1948, 1949, 1950, 1951, 1952, 1955, 1957, 1972, 1990, 1991, 1992, 1993, 1994, 1995, 1997, 1999, 2025
Willunga		Demons	Willunga Recreation Reserve, Willunga	SFL	1874	1986-	10	1986, 1988, 1998, 2004, 2005, 2006, 2007, 2008, 2009, 2021
Yankalilla		Tigers	Yankalilla Memorial Park, Yankalilla	SFL	1889	1935-1955, 1968-	3	1969, 1970, 1985

=== Former ===
Club	Colours	Nickname	Home Ground	Former League	Est.	Years in GSFL	GSFL Senior Premierships		Fate
Club	Colours	Nickname	Home Ground	Former League	Est.	Years in GSFL	Total	Years	Fate
Encounter Bay (original)			Encounter Bay Recreation Reserve, Encounter Bay	–	1921	1923-1953	1	1940	Merged with Valleys to form Bay Valley Rovers in 1954
Goolwa		Magpies	Goolwa Oval, Goolwa	–	1878	1923-2000	6	1925, 1932, 1953, 1975, 1976, 1977	Merged with Port Elliot to form Goolwa/Port Elliot
Milang		Panthers	Milang Oval, Milang	HFL	1881	1979-1984	0	-	Entered recess in 1985, re-formed in Hills FL in 1986
Port Elliot		Bloods	Port Elliott Oval, Port Elliot	–	1881	1923-2000	11	1927, 1929, 1931, 1933, 1935, 1936, 1937, 1938, 1939, 1962, 1973	Merged with Goolwa to form Goolwa/Port Elliot
Valleys		Eagles	Back Valley Oval, Back Valley	–	1946	1947-1953	0	-	Merged with Encounter Bay to form Bay Valley Rovers in 1954

== List of Premiers ==
List of premiership teams of Great Southern Football League.

- 1923 VICTOR HARBOUR FC
- 1924 VICTOR HARBOUR FC
- 1925 GOOLWA FC
- 1926 VICTOR HARBOUR FC
- 1927 PORT ELLIOT FC
- 1928 VICTOR HARBOUR FC
- 1929 PORT ELLIOT FC
- 1930 VICTOR HARBOUR FC
- 1931 PORT ELLIOT FC
- 1932 GOOLWA FC
- 1933 PORT ELLIOT FC
- 1934 VICTOR HARBOUR FC
- 1935 PORT ELLIOT FC
- 1936 PORT ELLIOT FC
- 1937 PORT ELLIOT FC
- 1938 PORT ELLIOT FC
- 1939 PORT ELLIOT FC
- 1940 ENCOUNTER BAY FC
- 1946 VICTOR HARBOUR FC
- 1947 VICTOR HARBOUR FC

- 1948 VICTOR HARBOUR FC
- 1949 VICTOR HARBOUR FC
- 1950 VICTOR HARBOUR FC
- 1951 VICTOR HARBOUR FC
- 1952 VICTOR HARBOUR FC
- 1953 GOOLWA FC
- 1954 MOUNT COMPASS FC
- 1955 VICTOR HARBOUR FC
- 1956 BAY VALLEY ROVERS FC
- 1957 VICTOR HARBOUR FC
- 1958 ENCOUNTER BAY FC
- 1959 MOUNT COMPASS FC
- 1960 ENCOUNTER BAY FC
- 1961 ENCOUNTER BAY FC
- 1962 PORT ELLIOT FC
- 1963 STRATHALBYN FC
- 1964 STRATHALBYN FC
- 1965 ENCOUNTER BAY FC
- 1966 STRATHALBYN FC
- 1967 ENCOUNTER BAY FC

- 1968 STRATHALBYN FC
- 1969 YANKALILLA FC
- 1970 YANKALILLA FC
- 1971 STRATHALBYN FC
- 1972 VICTOR HARBOUR FC
- 1973 PORT ELLIOT FC
- 1974 MYPONGA FC
- 1975 GOOLWA FC
- 1976 GOOLWA FC
- 1977 GOOLWA FC
- 1978 LANGHORNE CREEK FC
- 1979 STRATHALBYN FC
- 1980 MOUNT COMPASS FC
- 1981 STRATHALBYN FC
- 1982 STRATHALBYN FC
- 1983 MYPONGA FC
- 1984 MYPONGA FC
- 1985 YANKALILLA FC
- 1986 WILLUNGA FC
- 1987 STRATHALBYN FC

- 1988 WILLUNGA FC
- 1989 ENCOUNTER BAY FC
- 1990 VICTOR HARBOUR FC
- 1991 VICTOR HARBOUR FC
- 1992 VICTOR HARBOUR FC
- 1993 VICTOR HARBOUR FC
- 1994 VICTOR HARBOUR FC
- 1995 VICTOR HARBOUR FC
- 1996 ENCOUNTER BAY FC
- 1997 VICTOR HARBOUR FC
- 1998 WILLUNGA FC
- 1999 VICTOR HARBOUR FC
- 2000 STRATHALBYN FC
- 2001 LANGHORNE CREEK FC
- 2002 LANGHORNE CREEK FC
- 2003 MCLAREN FC
- 2004 WILLUNGA FC
- 2005 WILLUNGA FC
- 2006 WILLUNGA FC
- 2007 WILLUNGA FC

- 2008 WILLUNGA FC
- 2009 WILLUNGA FC
- 2010 STRATHALBYN FC
- 2011 LANGHORNE CREEK FC
- 2012 LANGHORNE CREEK FC
- 2013 ENCOUNTER BAY FC
- 2014 STRATHALBYN FC
- 2015 ENCOUNTER BAY FC
- 2016 MOUNT COMPASS FC
- 2017 MOUNT COMPASS FC
- 2018 LANGHORNE CREEK FC
- 2019 LANGHORNE CREEK FC
- 2020 LANGHORNE CREEK FC
- 2021 WILLUNGA FC
- 2022 MCLAREN FC
- 2023 MCLAREN FC
- 2024 MYPONGA-SELLICKS
- 2025 VICTOR HARBOR FC
- 2026 MCLAREN FC

== Mail Medal ==
The Mail Medal has been awarded since 1933. The Ozone Medal was awarded from 1925 to 1932.

Year	Name	Club
1925	Ralph Green	Port Elliot
1926	Bert Hutton	Encounter Bay
1927	Lloyd Pearce	Encounter Bay
1928	Clarrie Green	Port Elliot
1929	Clarrie Green	Port Elliot
1930	Joe Baxter	Victor Harbor
1931	Clarrie Green	Port Elliot
1932	M. Tobiason	Goolwa
1933	K. Rose	Port Elliot
1934	L. Tugwell	Victor Harbor
1935	C. Wheaton	Victor Harbor
1935	K. Rose	Port Elliot
1936	C. Wheaton	Victor Harbor
1937	C. Wheaton	Victor Harbor
1938	J. Harrison	Yankalilla
1939	J. Barton	Port Elliot
1940	R. Masters	Encounter Bay
1941–1948	No medal awarded	
1949	N. Clark	Encounter Bay
1949	K. Dodd	Port Elliot
1950	N. Clark	Encounter Bay
1951	Don Bartel	Encounter Bay
1952	J. Hamlyn	Yankalilla
1953	K. Grimwood	Mount Compass
1954	Doug Tugwell	Victor Harbor
1955	Doug Tugwell	Victor Harbor
1955	J. Green	Port Elliot
1956	J. Green	Port Elliot
1957	R. Penno	Mount Compass
1957	Don Bartel	Encounter Bay
1958	Alan Field	Encounter Bay
1959	Alan Field	Encounter Bay
1960	Clem Tonkin	Mount Compass
1961	J. Hawkes	Port Elliot
1962	Clem Tonkin	Mount Compass
1963	Bill Warton	Strathalbyn
1964	B. Walton	Victor Harbor
1964	B. Mudge	Port Elliot
1965	B. George	Victor Harbor
1966	B. George	Victor Harbor
1967	Ken Follett	Goolwa
1968	B. George	Victor Harbor
1969	R. Croser	Yankalilla
1970	Peter Gilbert	Strathalbyn
1971	M. Sullivan	Goolwa
1971	J. Jordan	Myponga
1972	W. Johnson	Victor Harbor
1973	Robin Greenwood	Mount Compass
1974	Kevin Mead	Myponga
1975	M. Rabbitt	Goolwa
1976	G. Wickham	Port Elliot
1977	R. Jessop	Victor Harbor
1978	Kevin Wray	Strathalbyn
1979	Kym Smith	Strathalbyn
1980	Kevin Poulter	Goolwa
1981	Brenton Smith	Strathalbyn
1982	Neil Haren	Goolwa
1983	Dennis Elliot	Langhorne Creek
1984	Neil Haren	Goolwa
1985	M. Symonds	Myponga
1985	Chris Rowntree	Myponga
1986	M. Fraser	Encounter Bay
1987	M. Symonds	Goolwa
1988	Kym Warren	Langhorne Creek
1989	B. Miller	Port Elliot
1990	D. Pearsons	Encounter Bay
1991	Chris Rowntree	Myponga
1992	Chris Rowntree	Myponga
1993	I. Barry	Victor Harbor
1994	R. Jolly	Goolwa
1995	B. Sharrad	Myponga
1996	P. Cook	Yankalilla
1997	Jason Lehmann	Strathalbyn
1998	David Whitbourne	Port Elliot
1999	Ben Baxter	Willunga
2000	Luen Credlin	Langhorne Creek
2001	Brett Heinrich	Langhorne Creek
2001	Adam Carnevale	Willunga
2002	Michael Cook	Strathalbyn
2003	Nathan Duffield	Strathalbyn
2004	Andrew McLean	Encounter Bay
2005	Damian Smith	Myponga-Sellicks
2006	Randall Follett	Langhorne Creek
2007	Marcus Burdett	Mount Compass
2008	Randall Follett	Langhorne Creek
2009	Ben Moore	Langhorne Creek
2010	John Pratt	Yankalilla
2011	Simon Munn	Strathalbyn
2012	Mitchell Portlock	Willunga
2013	Ian Perrie	Encounter Bay
2014	Rigby Barnes	Encounter Bay
2015	Rigby Barnes	Encounter Bay
2016	Sean Beath	Willunga
2016	Peter Hoban	Mount Compass
2017	Nathan Daniel	Mount Compass
2018	Michael Ross	Victor Harbor
2019	Daniel Bass	Willunga
2020	Brett Ellis	McLaren
2021	Brett Ellis	McLaren
2022	Brett Ellis	McLaren
2023	Jesse McKinnon	Victor Harbor
2024	Jesse McKinnon	Victor Harbor
2025	Sam Renney	Willunga

== Ladders ==
=== 2010 Ladder ===
Great Southern	Wins	Byes	Losses	Draws	For	Against	%	Pts	Final	Team	G	B	Pts	Team	G	B	Pts
Strathalbyn	16	0	2	0	2128	1072	66.50%	32	Elimination	Willunga	18	17	125	Langhorne Creek	7	9	51
Victor Harbour	15	0	3	0	1983	1118	63.95%	30	Qualifying	Victor Harbour	11	12	78	Yankalilla	9	9	63
Yankalilla	14	0	4	0	1933	1291	59.96%	28	1st Semi	Willunga	11	7	73	Yankalilla	4	10	34
Willunga	13	0	5	0	1968	1115	63.83%	26	2nd Semi	Strathalbyn	8	16	64	Victor Harbour	6	5	41
Langhorne Creek	11	0	7	0	1875	1337	58.37%	22	Preliminary	Willunga	18	12	120	Victor Harbour	8	10	58
Mount Compass	9	0	9	0	1765	1346	56.73%	18	Grand	Strathalbyn	13	8	86	Willunga	12	11	83
McLaren	4	0	14	0	1151	1740	39.81%	8									
Myponga	4	0	14	0	945	1866	33.62%	8									
Encounter Bay	2	0	16	0	920	2048	31.00%	4									
Goolwa/Port Elliot	2	0	16	0	849	2584	24.73%	4									

=== 2011 Ladder ===
Great Southern	Wins	Byes	Losses	Draws	For	Against	%	Pts	Final	Team	G	B	Pts	Team	G	B	Pts
Willunga	15	0	3	0	1965	1128	63.53%	30	Elimination	Yankalilla	16	11	107	Victor Harbour	10	6	66
Langhorne Creek	15	0	3	0	2184	1344	61.90%	30	Qualifying	Langhorne Creek	9	18	72	Strathalbyn	8	7	55
Strathalbyn	14	0	4	0	1872	1282	59.35%	28	1st Semi	Strathalbyn	17	17	119	Yankalilla	7	7	49
Yankalilla	13	0	5	0	1555	1350	53.53%	26	2nd Semi	Langhorne Creek	7	8	50	Willunga	8	14	62
Victor Harbour	10	0	8	0	1559	1384	52.97%	20	Preliminary	Langhorne Creek	15	10	100	Strathalbyn	10	11	71
Myponga	7	0	11	0	1325	1700	43.80%	14	Grand	Langhorne Creek	15	13	103	Willunga	6	11	47
Mount Compass	6	0	11	1	1655	1698	49.36%	13									
Encounter Bay	6	0	12	0	1257	1619	43.71%	12									
McLaren	2	0	15	1	1402	2169	39.26%	5									
Goolwa/Port Elliot	1	0	17	0	1048	2148	32.79%	2									

=== 2012 Ladder ===
Great Southern	Wins	Byes	Losses	Draws	For	Against	%	Pts	Final	Team	G	B	Pts	Team	G	B	Pts
Willunga	17	0	1	0	1903	1254	60.28%	34	Elimination	Encounter Bay	17	16	118	McLaren	9	9	63
Yankalilla	16	0	2	0	1685	983	63.16%	32	Qualifying	Langhorne Creek	18	11	119	Yankalilla	11	12	78
Langhorne Creek	12	0	6	0	1919	1225	61.04%	24	1st Semi	Langhorne Creek	15	12	102	Encounter Bay	10	6	66
Encounter Bay	10	0	8	0	1421	1239	53.42%	20	2nd Semi	Langhorne Creek	15	9	99	Willunga	6	12	48
McLaren	8	0	10	0	1265	1517	45.47%	16	Preliminary	Yankalilla	8	14	62	Willunga	8	13	61
Mount Compass	7	0	11	0	1265	1411	47.27%	14	Grand	Langhorne Creek	14	9	93	Yankalilla	11	6	72
Victor Harbour	6	0	12	0	1320	1627	44.79%	12									
Strathalbyn	6	0	12	0	1172	1650	41.53%	12									
Goolwa/Port Elliot	5	0	13	0	1182	1649	41.75%	10									
Myponga	3	0	15	0	969	1546	38.53%	6									

=== 2013 Ladder ===
Great Southern	Wins	Byes	Losses	Draws	For	Against	%	Pts	Final	Team	G	B	Pts	Team	G	B	Pts
Encounter Bay	16	0	2	0	1871	1020	64.72%	32	Elimination	Strathalbyn	18	11	119	Victor Harbour	16	6	102
Willunga	12	0	6	0	1564	1097	58.77%	24	Qualifying	Willunga	13	11	89	Langhorne Creek	7	13	55
Langhorne Creek	11	0	7	0	1769	1489	54.30%	22	1st Semi	Strathalbyn	19	11	125	Langhorne Creek	17	10	112
Strathalbyn	11	0	7	0	1306	1328	49.58%	22	2nd Semi	Willunga	16	9	105	Encounter Bay	12	14	86
Victor Harbour	9	0	9	0	1500	1390	51.90%	18	Preliminary	Encounter Bay	18	16	124	Strathalbyn	14	6	90
Goolwa/Port Elliot	8	0	10	0	1225	1306	48.40%	16	Grand	Encounter Bay	14	11	95	Willunga	13	5	83
Myponga	7	0	11	0	1011	1400	41.93%	14									
McLaren	6	0	12	0	1259	1557	44.71%	12									
Mount Compass	5	0	13	0	950	1321	41.83%	10									
Yankalilla	5	0	13	0	967	1514	38.98%	10									

=== 2014 Ladder ===
Great Southern	Wins	Byes	Losses	Draws	For	Against	%	Pts	Final	Team	G	B	Pts	Team	G	B	Pts
Encounter Bay	15	0	3	0	1714	1007	62.99%	30	Elimination	Goolwa	13	15	93	Willunga	5	9	39
Strathalbyn	15	0	3	0	1710	1269	57.40%	30	Qualifying	Langhorne Creek	15	8	98	Strathalbyn	13	13	91
Langhorne Creek	10	0	7	1	1513	1270	54.37%	21	1st Semi	Strathalbyn	13	12	90	Goolwa	10	6	66
Goolwa/Port Elliot	10	0	8	0	1509	1427	51.40%	20	2nd Semi	Encounter Bay	13	15	93	Langhorne Creek	8	14	62
Willunga	10	0	8	0	1319	1382	48.83%	20	Preliminary	Strathalbyn	23	12	150	Langhorne Creek	11	8	74
McLaren	9	0	9	0	1609	1548	50.97%	18	Grand	Strathalbyn	7	8	50	Encounter Bay	6	6	42
Mount Compass	8	0	10	0	1248	1222	50.53%	16									
Myponga	7	0	10	1	1531	1453	51.31%	15									
Victor Harbour	5	0	13	0	1282	1435	47.18%	10									
Yankalilla	0	0	18	0	935	2357	28.40%	0									

=== 2015 Ladder ===
Great Southern	Wins	Byes	Losses	Draws	For	Against	%	Pts	Final	Team	G	B	Pts	Team	G	B	Pts
Mount Compass	15	0	3	0	1672	996	62.67%	30	Elimination	Strathalbyn	13	7	85	Victor Harbour	10	12	72
Encounter Bay	15	0	3	0	1555	1028	60.20%	30	Qualifying	Encounter Bay	12	7	79	Goolwa/Port Elliot	4	12	36
Goolwa/Port Elliot	12	0	6	0	1535	1265	54.82%	24	1st Semi	Goolwa/Port Elliot	12	3	75	Strathalbyn	10	13	73
Victor Harbour	11	0	7	0	1139	1074	51.47%	22	2nd Semi	Encounter Bay	10	14	74	Mount Compass	10	2	62
Strathalbyn	8	0	10	0	1278	1437	47.07%	16	Preliminary	Mount Compass	12	18	90	Goolwa/Port Elliot	8	8	56
Myponga	7	0	11	0	1320	1461	47.46%	14	Grand	Encounter Bay	12	3	75	Mount Compass	7	9	51
Langhorne Creek	7	0	11	0	1261	1538	45.05%	14									
Willunga	6	0	12	0	1430	1735	45.18%	12									
Yankalilla	5	0	13	0	1263	1671	43.05%	10									
McLaren	4	0	14	0	1362	1610	45.83%	8									

=== 2016 Ladder ===
Great Southern	Wins	Byes	Losses	Draws	For	Against	%	Pts	Final	Team	G	B	Pts	Team	G	B	Pts
Mount Compass	15	0	3	0	1701	941	64.38%	30	Elimination	Willunga	8	14	62	Goolwa/Port Elliot	6	9	45
Strathalbyn	14	0	4	0	1683	1319	56.06%	28	Qualifying	Encounter Bay	13	5	83	Strathalbyn	11	12	78
Encounter Bay	12	0	5	1	1668	1174	58.69%	25	1st Semi	Strathalbyn	15	5	95	Willunga	14	2	86
Willunga	10	0	7	1	1496	1191	55.68%	21	2nd Semi	Mount Compass	10	10	70	Encounter Bay	5	11	41
Goolwa/Port Elliot	10	0	8	0	1522	1468	50.90%	20	Preliminary	Encounter Bay	11	8	74	Strathalbyn	11	7	73
Myponga	8	0	10	0	1228	1559	44.06%	16	Grand	Mount Compass	8	4	52	Encounter Bay	4	6	30
Yankalilla	7	0	11	0	1292	1248	50.87%	14									
Victor Harbour	7	0	11	0	1208	1536	44.02%	14									
Langhorne Creek	5	0	13	0	1346	1956	40.76%	10									
McLaren	1	0	17	0	1132	1884	37.53%	2									

=== 2017 Ladder ===
Great Southern	Wins	Byes	Losses	Draws	For	Against	%	Pts	Final	Team	G	B	Pts	Team	G	B	Pts
Willunga	14	0	4	0	1601	1090	59.49%	28	Elimination	Yankalilla	20	14	134	Goolwa/Port Elliot	4	12	36
Langhorne Creek	12	0	5	1	1608	1350	54.36%	25	Qualifying	Langhorne Creek	9	9	63	Mount Compass	11	8	74
Mount Compass	12	0	6	0	1728	1052	62.16%	24	1st Semi	Yankalilla	12	7	79	Langhorne Creek	7	6	48
Yankalilla	12	0	6	0	1435	1302	52.43%	24	2nd Semi	Mount Compass	19	15	129	Willunga	9	9	63
Goolwa/Port Elliot	9	0	8	1	1437	1414	50.40%	19	Preliminary	Willunga	15	9	99	Yankalilla	12	1	73
Victor Harbour	9	0	9	0	1357	1215	52.76%	18	Grand	Mount Compass	13	8	86	Willunga	9	8	62
Strathalbyn	9	0	9	0	1325	1519	46.59%	18									
Encounter Bay	7	0	11	0	1330	1524	46.60%	14									
Myponga-Sellicks	3	0	15	0	1044	1587	39.68%	6									
McLaren	2	0	16	0	1145	1957	36.91%	4									

=== 2018 Ladder ===
Great Southern	Wins	Byes	Losses	Draws	For	Against	%	Pts	Final	Team	G	B	Pts	Team	G	B	Pts
Mount Compass	15	0	3	0	1807	951	65.52%	30	Elimination	Willunga	13	12	90	Encounter Bay	11	11	77
Langhorne Creek	14	0	3	1	1861	1178	61.24%	29	Qualifying	Langhorne Creek	10	13	73	McLaren	8	8	56
McLaren	12	0	5	1	1733	1075	61.72%	25	1st Semi	McLaren	8	18	66	Willunga	10	4	64
Willunga	11	0	7	0	1692	1257	57.38%	22	2nd Semi	Langhorne Creek	10	16	76	Mount Compass	10	7	67
Encounter Bay	10	0	7	1	1593	1179	57.47%	21	Preliminary	McLaren	12	11	83	Mount Compass	11	12	78
Victor Harbour	9	0	8	1	1607	1471	52.21%	19	Grand	Langhorne Creek	15	11	101	McLaren	10	17	77
Myponga-Sellicks	9	0	9	0	1489	1435	50.92%	18									
Strathalbyn	6	0	12	0	1332	1735	43.43%	12									
Yankalilla	2	0	16	0	882	2284	27.86%	4									
Goolwa/Port Elliot	0	0	18	0	770	2201	25.92%	0									

== Books ==
- Encyclopedia of South Australian country football clubs / compiled by Peter Lines. ISBN 9780980447293
- South Australian country football digest / by Peter Lines ISBN 9780987159199
