= Yankalilla Football Club =

Yankalilla

Names
- Full name: Yankalilla Football Club
- Nickname(s): Tigers

Club details
- Founded: 1889; 136 years ago
- Colours
- Competition: GSFL
- Owners: The people of the Western Fleurieu Peninsula
- President: Lachy Nancarrow
- Coach: Micka James
- Captain(s): Jesse Fitzgerald
- Premierships: (7): 1934, 1937, 1962, 1963, 1969, 1970, 1985
- Ground(s): Yankalilla Memorial Park Sporting Complex
- Yankalilla Show Society Ground (until 1925)

Uniforms
Home

The Yankalilla Football Club is an Australian rules football club first formed in 1889 in Yankalilla, South Australia. Yankalilla was originally a member of the Fleurieu Football Association until it joined the Great Southern Football Association in 1935.

In 1955, Yankalilla entered a reserves team in the Southern Football Association B-Grade competition and the following season joined that competition entirely. Yankalilla remained in the Southern Football League until the end of the 1967 season when they transferred back to the Great Southern Football League where they have remained since.

Yankalilla continue to field Senior and Junior teams in the Great Southern Football League.

Yankalilla FC has produced two AFL/VFL footballers Kym Koster and Greg Whittlesea, formerly of Hawthorn, but more famous as a Magarey Medal winner for Sturt in the SANFL.

== A-Grade Premierships ==
- 1934 Fleurieu Peninsula Football Association A-Grade
- 1937 Great Southern Football Association A-Grade
- 1962 Southern Football Association A-Grade
- 1963 Southern Football Association A-Grade
- 1969 Great Southern Football League A-Grade
- 1970 Great Southern Football League A-Grade
- 1985 Great Southern Football League A-Grade
