= Electoral district of Ashford =

Former state electoral district of South Australia

Ashford South Australia—House of Assembly
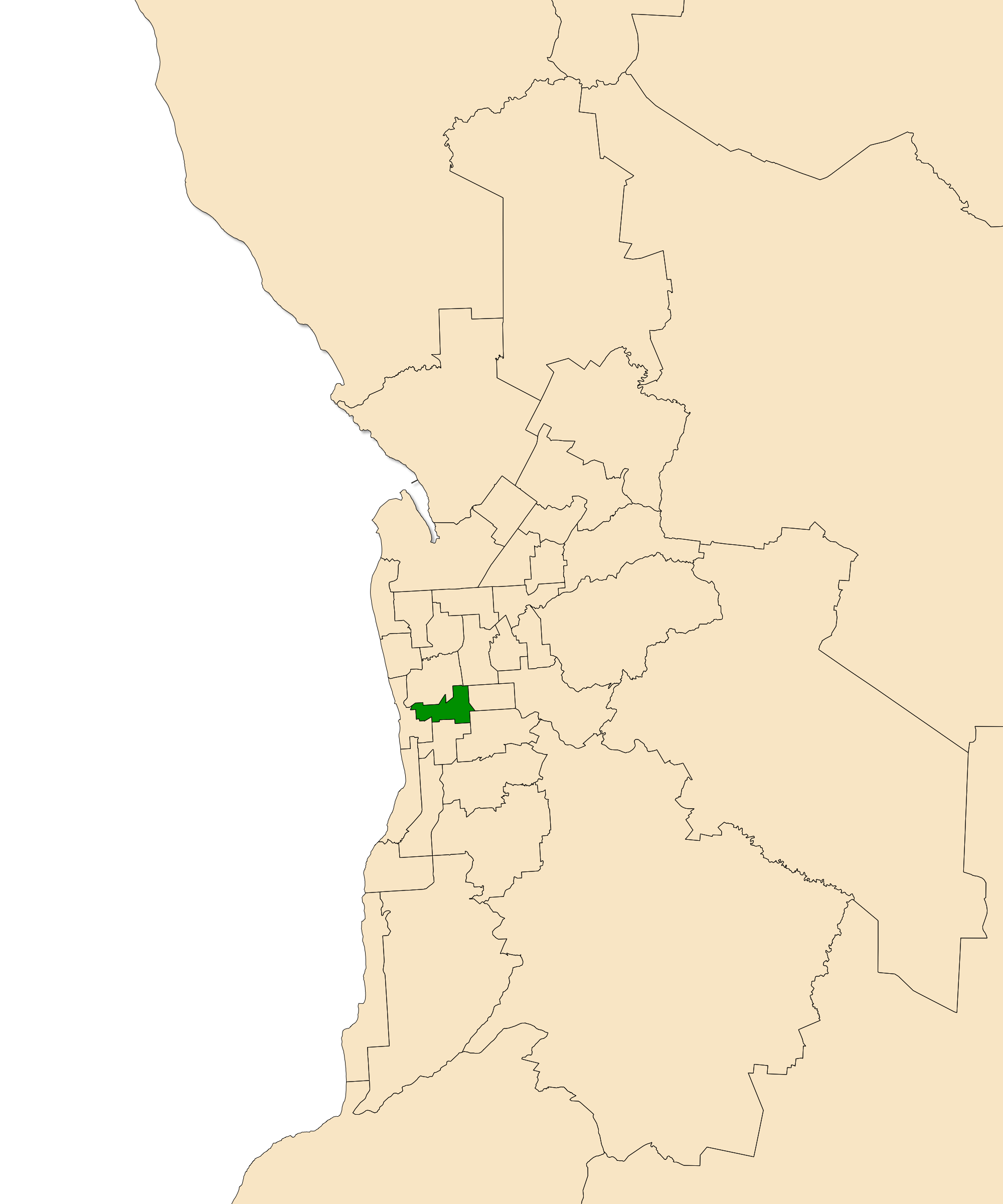
- Electoral district of Ashford (green) in the Greater Adelaide area
- State: South Australia
- Created: 2002
- Abolished: 2018
- Namesake: Ashford, South Australia
- Electors: 24,207 (2014)
- Area: 14.6 km^{2} (5.6 sq mi)
- Demographic: Metropolitan
- Coordinates: 34°57′32″S 138°33′33″E

Ashford is a former electorate for the South Australian Legislative Assembly which included many of Adelaide's inner south western suburbs. The district formed part of three federal electorates: the Division of Hindmarsh, the Division of Boothby, and the Division of Adelaide. The former electorate included the suburbs of Ashford, Black Forest, Camden Park, Clarence Gardens, Clarence Park, Cumberland Park, Everard Park, Forestville, Glandore, Keswick, Kings Park, Novar Gardens and Plympton as well as parts of Edwardstown, Goodwood, Millswood, Plympton Park, South Plympton and Wayville. The former electorate covered an area of approximately 14.6 square kilometres (5.6 sq mi).

The electorate's name derives from the name given by early settler Charles George Everard to his property 'Ashford' in 1838 that was thought to have the best orchard in the colony. The name was also given to a suburb within the electorate. The district of Hanson was renamed to Ashford at the 2002 election. Hanson was re-drawn from a marginal Liberal to a marginal Labor electorate at the 1993 election. Often redistributed in all directions, particularly north and east, the only constant suburb in Ashford and Hanson has been the western half of Plympton. Incumbent Liberal MP Heini Becker moved to Peake, now West Torrens, however Ashford was still narrowly won by Liberal candidate Stewart Leggett. Up until its abolition, the seat was held by Labor member Steph Key who defeated Leggett at the 1997 election. A redistribution prior to the 2014 election saw Labor's margin significantly reduced from 4.8 percent to 0.6 percent however Labor retained the seat with an increased margin of 1.9 percent.

Ashford was replaced by Badcoe at the 2018 election; with a significant increase to the Labor margin in the seat resulting from the 2016 electoral redistribution. Key announced in February 2017 that she would retire from parliament as of the 2018 election.

== Members for Ashford ==
Member	Party	Term
Steph Key	Labor	2002–2018

== Election results ==
2014 South Australian state election: Ashford
Party	Candidate	Votes	%	±%
Liberal	Terina Monteagle	9,335	43.1	+0.6
Labor	Steph Key	8,597	39.7	−0.3
Greens	Christiana Griffith	2,654	12.2	−0.4
Family First	Robyn Munro	841	3.9	−0.4
FREE Australia	Steve Sansom	247	1.1	+1.1
Total formal votes		21,674	96.9	−0.1
Informal votes		700	3.1	+0.1
Turnout		22,374	92.4	+0.6
Two-party-preferred result
Labor	Steph Key	11,247	51.9	+1.3
Liberal	Terina Monteagle	10,427	48.1	−1.3
Labor hold		Swing	+1.3	
