= Electoral district of Badcoe =

South Australian state electoral district

Badcoe South Australia—House of Assembly
- Interactive map of electoral district boundaries from the 2022 state election (Note: The electorate will have no change in boundaries at the 2026 state election.)
- State: South Australia
- Created: 2018
- MP: Jayne Stinson
- Party: Labor Party
- Namesake: Peter Badcoe VC
- Electors: 27,481 (2022)
- Area: 14.5 km^{2} (5.6 sq mi)
- Demographic: Metropolitan
- Coordinates: 34.96°S 138.57°E
Electorates around Badcoe:
Colton	West Torrens	Adelaide
Morphett	Badcoe	Unley
Gibson	Elder	Elder

Badcoe is a single-member electoral district for the South Australian House of Assembly. It was created by the redistribution conducted in 2016, and was contested for the first time at the 2018 state election.

Badcoe lies south-west of the Adelaide city centre and includes the suburbs of Keswick, Ashford, Forestville, Everard Park, Black Forest, Clarence Park, Clarence Gardens, Kurralta Park, Glandore, Edwardstown, Ascot Park, North Plympton, South Plympton and parts of Millswood and Plympton.

== History ==
Badcoe is named after Peter John Badcoe VC (1934–1967) who grew up in Adelaide before joining the Australian Army in 1952. He served in artillery and infantry and was killed in the Vietnam War.

Badcoe was created as a replacement for Ashford, which was abolished at the 2018 state election. At its creation, Badcoe was projected to be notionally held by the Labor Party with a swing of 4.2% required to lose it.

In February 2017 the member for Ashford, Steph Key, announced that she did not intend to contest the 2018 election.

== Members for Badcoe ==
Member	Party	Term
Jayne Stinson	Labor	2018–present

== Election results ==
2026 South Australian state election: Badcoe
Party	Candidate	Votes	%	±%
Labor	Jayne Stinson	11,508	49.0	−1.0
One Nation	Daniel Shepherd	4,181	17.8	+14.7
Greens	Josh Andersen-Ward	3,889	16.6	+5.1
Liberal	Amar Singh	3,240	13.8	−15.4
Family First	Radosav Jovanovic	469	2.0	+0.2
Australian Family	Jonathan Attard	183	0.8	−1.3
Total formal votes		23,470	97.4	+1.2
Informal votes		619	2.6	−1.2
Turnout		24,089	88.1	−1.0
Two-party-preferred result
Labor	Jayne Stinson	16,700	71.2	+6.4
One Nation	Daniel Shepherd	6,770	28.8	+28.8
Labor hold				
