= Peter Badcoe =

Australian Victoria Cross recipient

Peter Badcoe VC
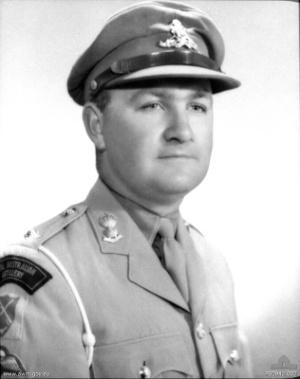
- Peter Badcock c. 1954
- Born: Peter John Badcock; 11 January 1934; Malvern, South Australia
- Died: 7 April 1967 (aged 33); An Thuan, Hương Trà District, Thua Thien-Hue Province, South Vietnam
- Burial place: Terendak Garrison Cemetery
- Military career
- Allegiance: Australia
- Branch: Australian Army
- Service years: 1950–1967
- Rank: Major
- Nickname: The Galloping Major
- Units: 1st Field Regiment; 4th Field Regiment; Australian Army Training Team Vietnam
- Conflicts: Vietnam War
- Awards: Victoria Cross; Silver Star (United States); Knight of the National Order of Vietnam

Peter John Badcoe, VC (11 January 1934 – 7 April 1967) was an Australian recipient of the Victoria Cross, the highest award for gallantry in battle that could be awarded at that time to a member of the Australian armed forces. Badcoe, born Peter Badcock, joined the Australian Army in 1950 and graduated from the Officer Cadet School, Portsea, in 1952 as a second lieutenant in the Royal Australian Artillery. A series of regimental postings followed, including a tour in the Federation of Malaya in 1962, during which he spent a week in South Vietnam observing the fighting. During the previous year, Badcock had changed his surname to Badcoe. After another regimental posting, he transferred to the Royal Australian Infantry Corps, and was promoted to major.

In August 1966, Badcoe arrived in South Vietnam as a member of the Australian Army Training Team Vietnam. He was initially a sub-sector adviser, but in December became the operations adviser for Thừa Thiên-Huế Province. In this role, between February and April 1967, he displayed conspicuous gallantry and leadership on three occasions while on operations with South Vietnamese Regional Force units. In the final battle, he was killed by machine-gun fire. He was highly respected by both his South Vietnamese and United States allies, and was posthumously awarded the Victoria Cross for his actions. He was also awarded the United States Silver Star and several South Vietnamese medals. He was buried at Terendak Garrison Cemetery in Malaysia.

In 2008, Badcoe's medal set was auctioned for A$ 488,000 to Kerry Stokes in collaboration with the Government of South Australia. After going on display at the South Australian Museum and touring regional South Australia, it is now displayed in the Hall of Valour at the Australian War Memorial in Canberra. Buildings and awards have been named after Badcoe, including the rest and recreation centre in South Vietnam, an assembly room and library at Portsea, the main lecture theatre at the Royal Military College, Duntroon, a divisional building at the Australian Defence Force Academy, and a perpetual medal for an Australian Football League match held on Anzac Day; as well as the electoral district of Badcoe in the South Australian House of Assembly.

== Early life and career ==
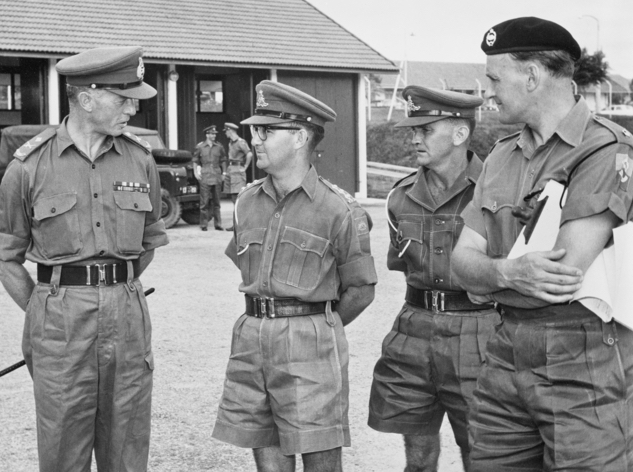
A group of Australian Army officers in Singapore with Badcoe in the centre wearing glasses.

Badcoe was born Peter John Badcock on 11 January 1934 in the Adelaide suburb of Malvern, South Australia. His father was Leslie Allen Badcock, a public servant, and his mother was Gladys Mary Ann May née Overton. He was educated at Adelaide Technical High School, before gaining employment as a clerk with the South Australian Public Service in 1950. Despite his father's opposition, Badcock held ambitions to join the Australian Army; and enlisted in the Regular Army on 10 June 1950.

After a brief posting to the 16th National Service Battalion in early 1952, Badcock entered the Officer Cadet School, Portsea, on 12 July 1952, and was commissioned as a second lieutenant in the Royal Australian Artillery on 13 December that year. This was followed by a short posting to the 14th National Service Training Battalion, then a posting to the 1st Field Regiment in 1953. He returned to train national servicemen at Puckapunyal, Victoria, in 1955–1957. On 26 May 1956, he married Denise Maureen MacMahon in the Methodist Church at Manly, New South Wales. The couple had three daughters – Carey, Kim and Susanne. Badcock was posted back to the 1st Field Regiment in 1957–1958.

A junior staff officer in the Directorate of Military Operations and Plans at Australian Army Headquarters from 1958 until 1961, he was promoted to temporary captain in 1958, and substantive captain in June 1960. On 6 February 1961, he was posted to the 4th Field Regiment, and the same year changed his surname to Badcoe. The couple decided to change their surname after their third daughter was born in order to make it easier for them.

On training exercises, Badcoe was aggressive and energetic. He was also a quiet, gentle and retiring man who confided mainly in his wife and had a dry wit. His colleagues found him inscrutable. He avoided boisterous mess activities and preferred reading military history. Short and stocky, a teetotaller who did not smoke, he wore horn-rimmed spectacles and regaled his colleagues on military matters when off-duty.

In June 1961, Badcoe was posted to the 103rd Field Battery as battery captain, and served a tour with them in the Federation of Malaya, attached to a British unit, in the aftermath of the Malayan Emergency. He was detached from Malaya to South Vietnam over the period 7–14 November 1962, and observed how that country was combating the Viet Cong (VC) and North Vietnamese insurgency. During his visit, Badcoe sought opportunities to experience combat. He spent five days with an Army of the Republic of Vietnam (ARVN) battalion on operations in Quảng Ngãi Province, during which the unit had contacts with the enemy, including a pitched battle. During what was supposed to be a rest period, he arranged a helicopter flight to visit a Montagnard base in the Central Highlands. When his return to Malaya was delayed by an aircraft engine breakdown, he managed to join a heliborne operation of the 7th ARVN Division in the Mekong Delta. He returned to the 1st Field Regiment in November 1962 and remained with the unit until August 1965. At this point, Badcoe transferred from the artillery to the Royal Australian Infantry Corps, and on promotion to temporary major on 10 August 1965, was posted to the Infantry Centre at Ingleburn, New South Wales. Badcoe successfully applied for a posting with the Australian Army Training Team Vietnam (AATTV), and attended adviser courses at the Intelligence Centre at Mosman, New South Wales, and Jungle Training Centre in Canungra, Queensland. He was promoted to provisional major in June 1966.

== Vietnam War ==
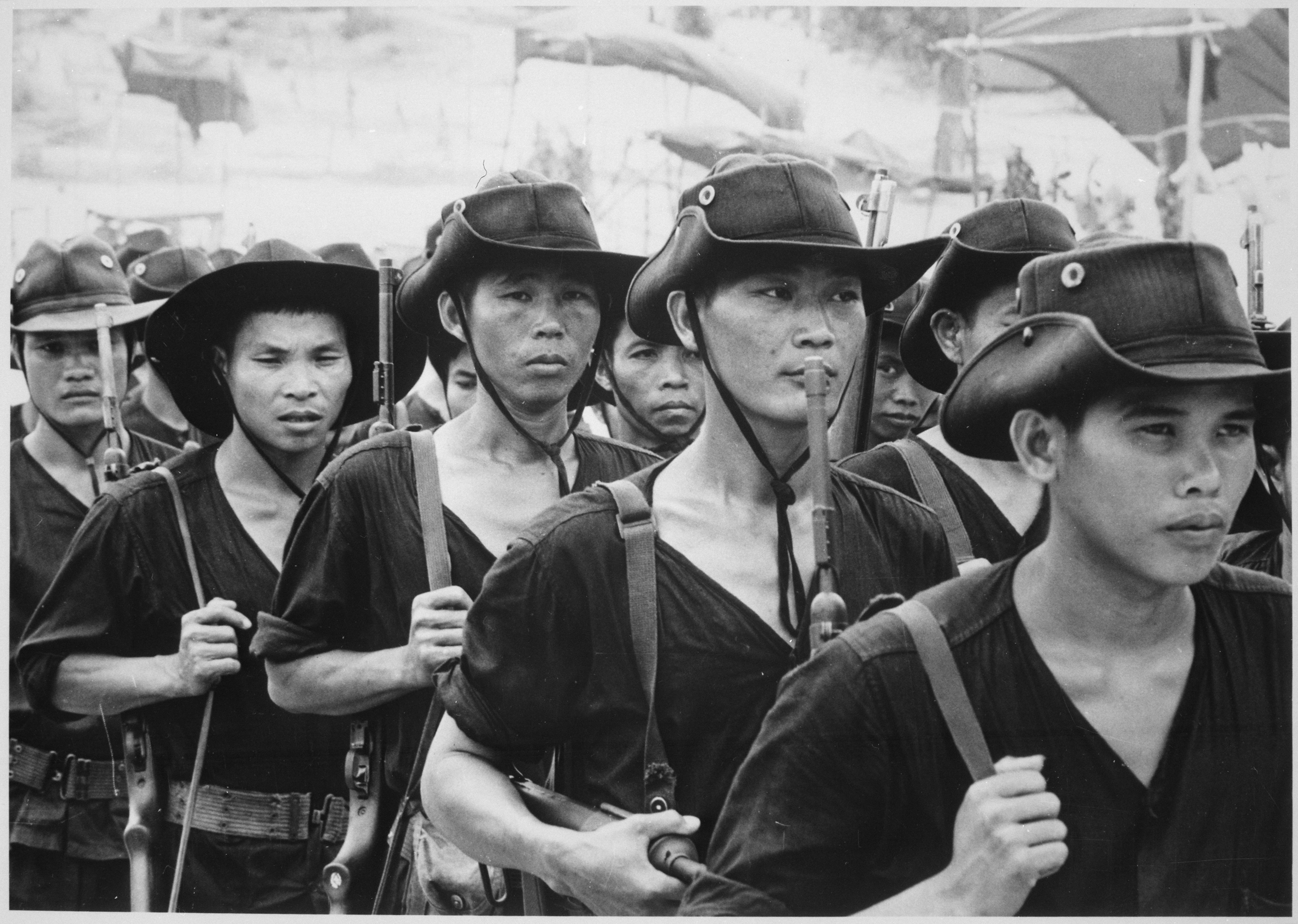
South Vietnamese Territorial Forces soldiers undergoing training.

Badcoe arrived in South Vietnam on 6 August 1966 as a member of the AATTV. He was posted as a sub-sector adviser in the Nam Hóa District of Thừa Thiên Province. Sub-sector advisers worked at the district level with two elements of the Territorial Forces, the Regional Force (RF) and Popular Force (PF), which were both forms of full-time provincial militia under control of the provincial chief, who was also the military sector chief. Each sector corresponded with a province, and each sub-sector with a district. The sector and sub-sector advisers had several responsibilities: to accompany the RF/PF, colloquially known as "Ruff-Puffs", on operations; to provide on-the-job training to the RF/PF; to oversee security in the hamlets; and to liaise with the ARVN troops operating in the sector or sub-sector.

In his first week at Nam Hóa, Badcoe was advising an RF company on a clearing operation when it came under fire from VC irregulars in a treeline. As the company pressed forward, it came under fire from a bunker. Badcoe unsuccessfully tried to silence the bunker using his rifle and hand grenades, at which point the company commander suggested calling in close air support. Badcoe responded that air support was not necessary. He collected two jerrycans of petrol from a jeep following the company and then, circling around using cover, approached the bunker from outside its arc of fire. He poured both jerrycans over the bunker, backed off some distance and ignited it with a white phosphorus grenade, destroying the VC position and allowing the company to advance.

Easily identified by the maroon paratroop beret he wore, Badcoe led from the front and gave the impression he believed himself invincible. According to the former AATTV adviser and military historian Ian McNeill, enthusiasm, courage and audacity were Badcoe's hallmarks, and those around him were often infected by his optimism. Badcoe was so fearless he appeared reckless, and was often cautioned by colleagues in this respect. Jim Pashen, a warrant officer serving with the AATTV, recalled Badcoe driving alone in a jeep from Huế to Quảng Trị, and being shot at by snipers as he passed by. Badcoe was also very interested in Vietnam, its people and their customs, and was particularly fascinated by Huế, the ancient royal city. He traded alcohol and souvenirs from the AATTV's canteen with US Marines to acquire equipment for RF units, and also donated food and supplies to an orphanage.

In December 1966, Badcoe became the sector operations adviser at the provincial headquarters in Huế. This role generally involved planning, liaison and staff work, but Badcoe interpreted his duty statement flexibly and led local forces into combat whenever he got the chance. According to a fellow AATTV officer, Captain Barry Rissel, he was a "veritable tiger" in combat, a characteristic that led his US allies to dub him "The Galloping Major". At his first meeting with Badcoe, Corporal Chris Black described the scene:

An old, bright red beret sat jauntily on his head. His drab jungle greens were almost hidden under the most amazing collection of weapons I have ever seen on one man. A Swedish sub-machine gun, his favourite, hung over one shoulder. It was balanced on the other side by a snub-nosed grenade launcher. On his belt an Australian pistol hung heavily and in one hand he heft an American machine-gun. He lowered the armament to the floor, crossed the room, shook hands, refused a drink and talked about his boys.

On 23 February 1967, Badcoe and his United States Marine Corps deputy, Captain James Custar, were advising an RF company operation in the Phu Thu District. About 660 yards (600 m) on their flank was a PF platoon accompanied by two United States Army advisers, Captain Clement and Sergeant Thomas. Badcoe and Custar began to hear intermittent rifle fire, coming from the direction of the flanking platoon. Custar was monitoring radio transmissions when he heard that Clement had been wounded and Thomas was in danger. Badcoe ran across the intervening fire-swept ground to reach the PF platoon, with the enemy fire intensifying as he approached. He discovered that Clement was lying 160 yards (150 m) ahead of the platoon, and had been mortally wounded while going to assist a wounded PF soldier. Thomas had tried to reach Clement and had in turn been wounded and was lying in the open between Clement and the platoon, which had pulled back. Badcoe observed that the enemy were dug in along a small rise, and appeared to be in about company-strength and readying for an attack. He gathered the PF platoon and led a frontal assault on the enemy position, firing as he went. Dodging automatic fire, he charged a machine-gun position and shot the crew with his rifle. Led by Badcoe, the PF platoon inflicted heavy casualties on the enemy. Once the PF platoon had consolidated its position, Badcoe went back, still under fire, to lift Clement and carry him out of the danger area. He then returned and assisted Thomas to a position from which he could be safely evacuated. The operation concluded successfully.

Two weeks later, the sector RF reaction company was tasked to the Quảng Điền District sub-sector on 7 March in response to an attack on its district headquarters by a VC force of about two battalions. Quảng Điền District headquarters was in the eponymous village, about 16 miles (25 km) northwest of Huế. Badcoe was travelling in a vehicle convoy with his deputy and another US officer, when their vehicle veered off the road into a ditch. His deputy was killed and Badcoe left the vehicle and joined the company commander as they drove towards the village. By the time Badcoe and the company arrived, the village was occupied by the VC, and they were attacking the district headquarters from three sides. Badcoe quickly formed the company up into platoons, then led them through enemy fire to a position which flanked the VC. Forming them into an extended line, he then led them in an assault across open ground against the main VC force. In the face of this attack, the VC withdrew in disarray and the garrison of the district headquarters was saved. Badcoe's intervention prevented serious losses and the capture of the district headquarters.

Badcoe became disillusioned with the war during his service in South Vietnam. He was particularly affected by an incident in February 1967 in which the ARVN regiment he was working with called in a napalm strike on a VC-occupied village, whose population was strongly supportive of the government, instead of attempting to attack and dislodge the VC. Badcoe and other advisers attempted to stop the use of napalm, but the ARVN divisional headquarters overruled them. A total of 40 civilians were killed or wounded, and Badcoe spent the next day-and-a-half arranging the removal of bodies and new accommodation for the survivors. He eventually concluded that the conflict was an "unwinnable war". On 7 April, Badcoe, who wrote frankly to his wife and children, penned a letter to them expressing his "unease and cynicism" about the conduct of the war and indicating that he wished to come home. At this time Badcoe was planning to take a short break on the Japanese island of Okinawa starting the following day, with an Australian Army friend who had been visiting him, observing operations.

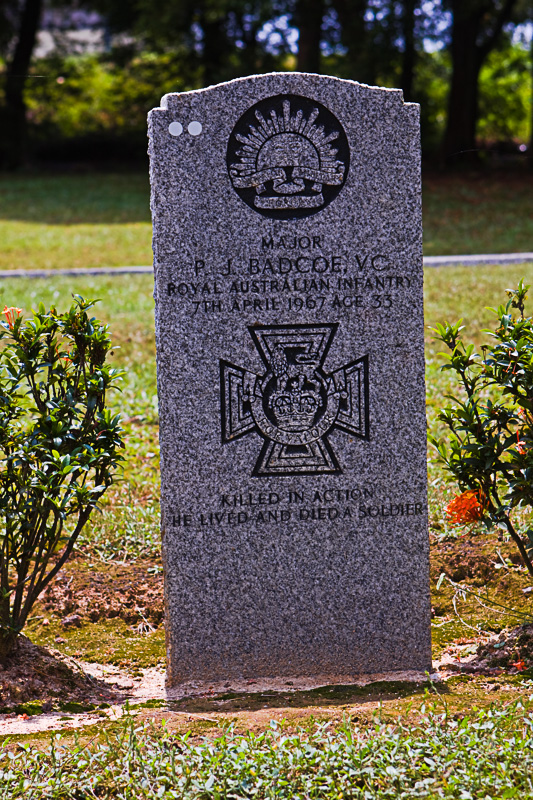
Badcoe's grave in the Terendak Garrison Cemetery

When he returned from the field early in the morning of 7 April, Badcoe was told that he was required to act as sector headquarters duty officer due to the illness of another adviser. He saw his friend off to Da Nang and returned to Huế where he commenced duty, planning to join his friend once he had completed his shift. He soon became aware that an operation was going badly for an ARVN force at the hamlet of An Thuan in Hương Trà District, about 7.5 miles (12 km) north of Huế. The operation involved the elite Hac Bao (Black Panther) divisional reaction company of the 1st ARVN Division, along with a squadron of armoured personnel carriers (APCs) and two RF companies. They were attempting to eliminate a VC force of about two companies which was holding well-entrenched positions at An Thuan. The ARVN force had been met with intense fire and had suffered heavy casualties. Badcoe realised that the force did not have any advisers, because one of the Hac Bao advisers was ill, and advisers were required to work in pairs. Without any advisers, the ARVN were unable to access close air support to dislodge the VC.

Badcoe decided that he needed to go out to the ARVN force and assist them. He arranged for relief as the sector duty officer, grabbed his weapons and equipment, and collected Sergeant Alberto Alvarado, his US Army deputy adviser and radio operator. They sped in their jeep towards An Thuan. Upon arrival, they found the ARVN force preparing for another assault, which was to consist of the APCs followed by the Hac Bao company. Badcoe and his deputy climbed aboard an APC and joined the attack. About 820 feet (250 m) from An Thuan, the force was moving through the hamlet's cemetery and hostile fire increased markedly, from recoilless rifles, mortars, machine guns and small arms. The APCs drove through the cemetery and deployed to suppress the enemy fire. The Hac Bao company pressed forward through the cemetery, at which time Badcoe and Alvarado dismounted and joined them. During the last stages of the attack, the two advisers were leading the infantry when the enemy fire became so heavy that both the APCs and infantry began falling back through the cemetery.

Badcoe began rallying the ARVN soldiers to renew the assault, and artillery was called in on the enemy positions. After this, Badcoe and Alvarado again pushed forward, attempting to encourage the ARVN troops to press home the attack. The final stages of the line of assault crossed dry, open rice paddy fields with no cover. Enemy fire converged on Badcoe, Alvarado and the ARVN troops, who again went to ground. On this occasion, Badcoe refused to fall back. He headed straight for an enemy machine-gun position that was causing devastation among the ARVN force. Forced to ground by the intense fire, Badcoe was soon joined by Alvarado. Badcoe lifted himself up to throw a hand grenade, but was pulled down by Alvarado as bullets cracked overhead. When he rose to throw again, he was cut down by machine-gun fire and killed instantly. Alvarado attempted to recover his body, but was shot in the leg. He then used his radio to call in close air support and more artillery to suppress the enemy fire. The Hac Bao company, supported by the APCs, then moved forward and captured the objective.

A military funeral for Badcoe was held in Huế, the largest for any Allied soldier until that date. Badcoe was buried in the Terendak Garrison Cemetery in Malacca, Malaysia. The epitaph on his gravestone reads: "He lived and died a soldier". According to McNeill, Badcoe was highly respected by both South Vietnamese and US allies, and was an inspirational leader who had saved the lives of his comrades and turned defeat into victory on many occasions.

== Post-script ==
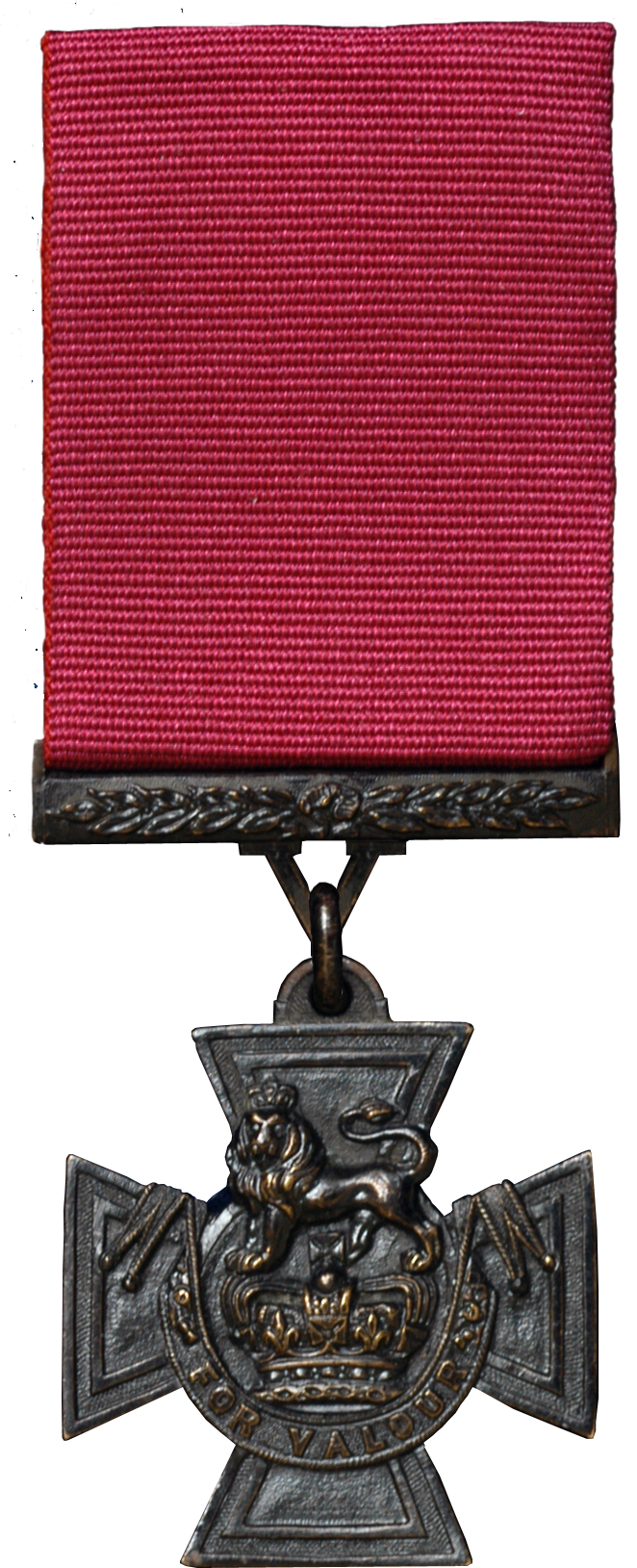
The Victoria Cross

For his courage and leadership on 23 February, 7 March, and 7 April 1967, Badcoe was posthumously awarded the Victoria Cross, the highest award for gallantry in battle that could be awarded at that time to a member of the Australian armed forces. The full citation for the award appeared in The London Gazette on 17 October 1967. It read, in part:

On 23rd February 1967 he was acting as an Advisor to a Regional Force Company in support of a Sector operation in Phu Thu District. He monitored a radio transmission which stated that the Subsector Adviser, a United States Army Officer, had been killed and that his body was within 50 metres of an enemy machine gun position; further, the United States Medical Adviser had been wounded and was in immediate danger from the enemy. Major Badcoe with complete disregard for his own safety moved alone across 600 metres of fire-swept ground and reached the wounded Adviser, attended to him and ensured his future safety. He then organised a force of one platoon and led them towards the enemy post. His personal leadership, words of encouragement, and actions in the face of hostile enemy fire forced the platoon to successfully assault the enemy position and capture it, where he personally killed the machine gunners directly in front of him. He then picked up the body of the dead officer and ran back to the Command post over open ground still covered by enemy fire.

On 7th March 1967, at approximately 0645 hours, the Sector Reaction Company was deployed to Quang Dien Subsector to counter an attack by the Viet Cong on the Headquarters. Major Badcoe left the Command group after their vehicle broke down and a United States Officer was killed; he joined the Company Headquarters and personally led the company in an attack over open terrain to assault and capture a heavily defended enemy position. In the face of certain death and heavy losses his personal courage and leadership turned certain defeat into victory and prevented the enemy from capturing the District Headquarters.

On 7th April 1967, on an operation in Huong Tra District, Major Badcoe was with the 1st A.R.V.N. Division Reaction Company and some armoured personnel carriers. During the move forward to an objective the company came under heavy small arms fire and withdrew to a cemetery for cover, this left Major Badcoe and his radio operator about 50 metres in front of the leading elements, under heavy mortar fire. Seeing this withdrawal, Major Badcoe ran back to them, moved amongst them and by encouragement and example got them moving forward again. He then set out in front of the company to lead them on; the company stopped again under heavy fire but Major Badcoe continued on to cover and prepared to throw grenades, when he rose to throw, his radio operator pulled him down as heavy small arms fire was being brought to bear on them; he later got up again to throw a grenade and was hit and killed by a burst of machine gun fire. Soon after, friendly artillery fire was called in and the position was assaulted and captured.

Major Badcoe's conspicuous gallantry and leadership on all these occasions was an inspiration to all, each action, ultimately, was successful, due entirely to his efforts, the final one ending in his death. His valour and leadership were in the highest traditions of the military profession and the Australian Regular Army.

— The London Gazette 17 October 1967

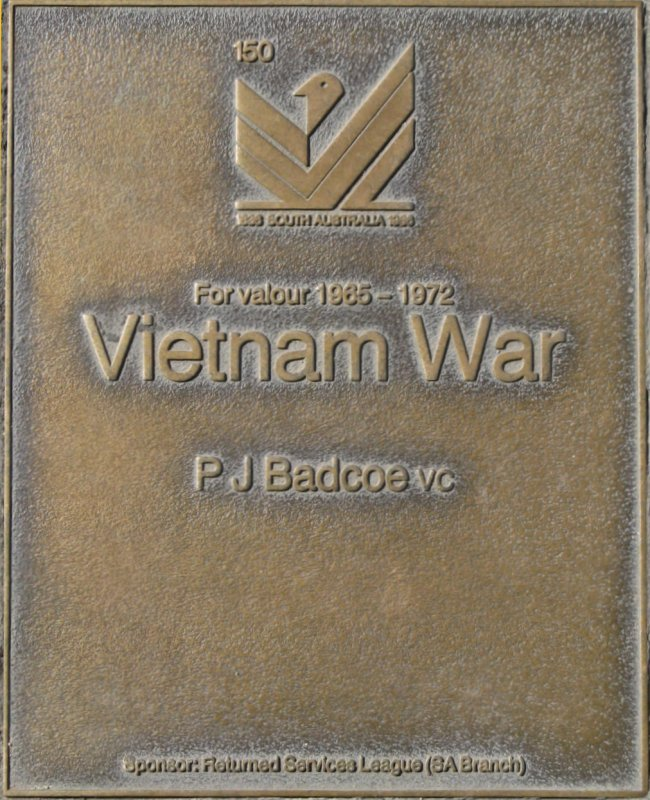
Jubilee 150 Walkway plaque on North Terrace, Adelaide, commemorating Badcoe

Denise Badcoe received her husband's Victoria Cross from the Governor-General, Lord Casey, at Government House, Canberra, on 5 April 1968. Badcoe was awarded the United States Silver Star with bronze oak leaf cluster, Air Medal and Purple Heart, and was made a Knight of the National Order of Vietnam. South Vietnam also awarded him the Cross of Gallantry with Palm, Gold Star, and Silver Star, the Armed Forces Honor Medal, First Class, Vietnam Campaign Medal and Wound Medal, and he posthumously received the Vietnam Medal and Australian Defence Medal from Australia. The Official History of Australia's Involvement in Southeast Asian Conflicts 1948–1975 judged that Badcoe was "a dedicated career soldier" who "quickly acquired an understanding of the Vietnamese people and their customs along with an affectionate respect for the Vietnamese territorials he trained and led".

Members of the AATTV received many decorations, and the unit gained the distinction of being "probably the mostly highly decorated unit for its size in the Australian Army". Only four Australians were awarded the Victoria Cross in Vietnam; all went to members of the AATTV, two of them posthumously.

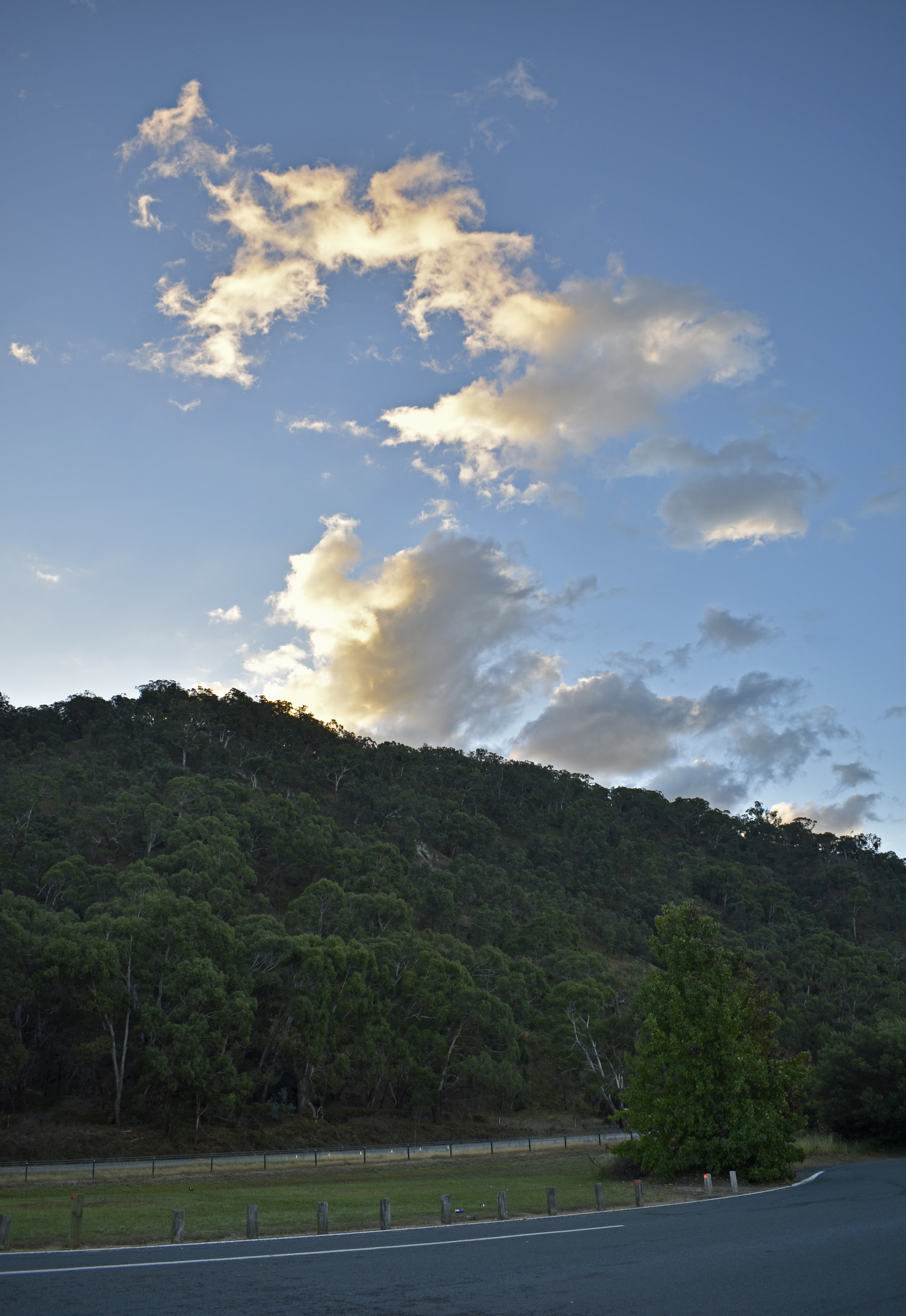
Peter Badcoe VC Rest area on the M23 highway near Lake George, New South Wales

The soldiers' club at the 1st Australian Support Compound in Vung Tau was named the Peter Badcoe Club in his honour in November 1967. At Portsea, the assembly room and library was named after him, complete with a portrait and bronze plaque. After Portsea closed in 1985, the main lecture theatre in the Military Instruction Block at Royal Military College, Duntroon in Canberra was named after him. In 1998–1999, a rest area in Badcoe's honour was established near Lake George on the Remembrance Driveway between Canberra and Sydney. In 1999, the Ex-Military Rehabilitation Centre moved to the "Peter Badcoe VC Complex" at Edinburgh, South Australia.

Badcoe's medal group and personal memoirs were offered for sale by auction in Sydney on 20 May 2008 and were sold for A$ 488,000 to the media magnate and philanthropist Kerry Stokes in collaboration with the Government of South Australia. Badcoe's Victoria Cross and associated medals were displayed at the South Australian Museum in Adelaide, prior to being toured to 17 regional towns in South Australia between 21 March and 20 June 2009, before being displayed permanently at the Australian War Memorial in Canberra from 2016. His VC was the 71st of the 100 VCs awarded to Australians to be placed on public display there. Since 2004, the award for the player displaying the most courage, skill, self-sacrifice and teamwork in the Australian Football League match in Adelaide on Anzac Day each year has been called the Peter Badcoe VC Medal. The medal has been won by three times by Travis Boak of the Port Adelaide Football Club, and twice by Joel Selwood of the Geelong Football Club.

In 2015, the Australian government repatriated the remains of 22 Australian soldiers buried at Terendak, but the Badcoe family asked that he remain buried there, in accordance with his express wishes. In 2016, the South Australian electoral district of Ashford was renamed Badcoe in his honour. In 2020, a 60-bed residential aged care facility named Peter Badcoe VC House was completed in Newcastle, New South Wales, by the Returned and Services League of Australia (New South Wales Branch) aged care arm, RSL LifeCare.
