= Westbourne Park =

Westbourne Park may refer to:

- Westbourne Park, London, former name of Westbourne
- Westbourne Park tube station, London Underground station
- Westbourne Park, South Australia
