= Melrose Park, South Australia =

Melrose Park
- Suburb
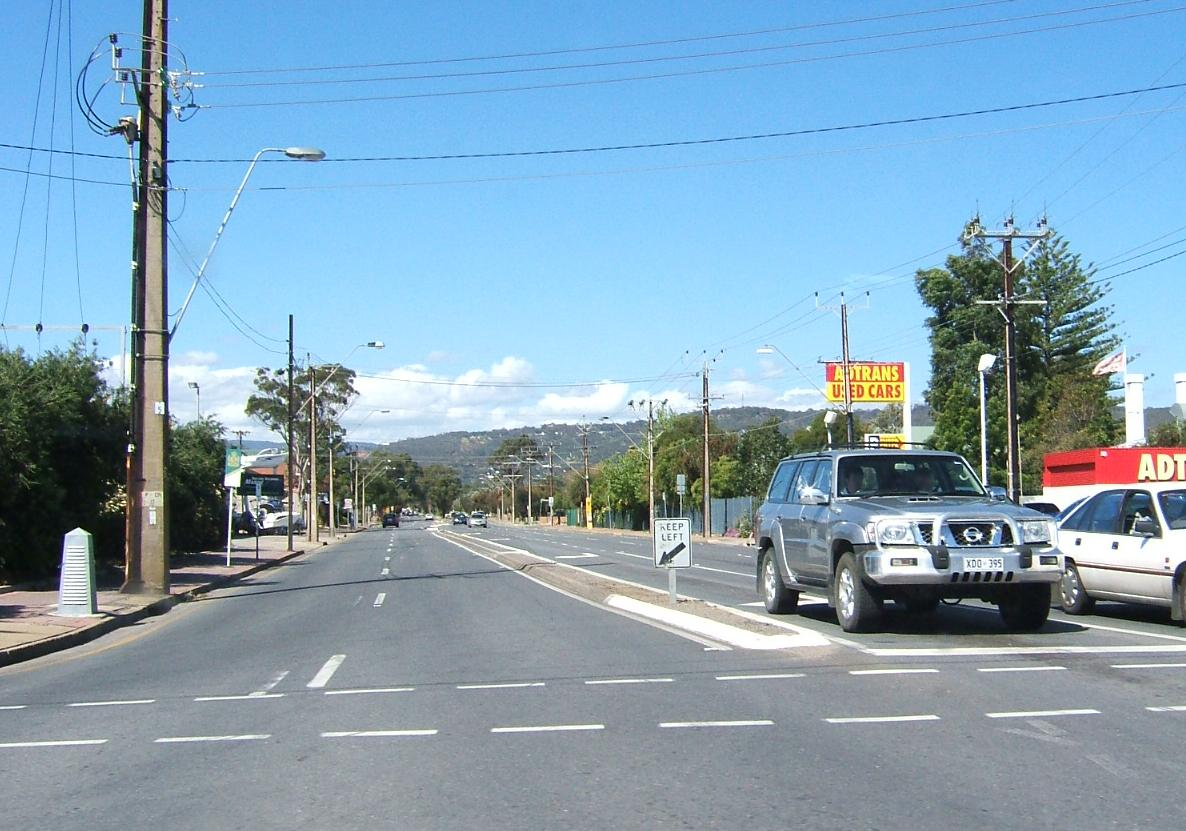
- Looking east along Daws Road. Melrose Park is to the left (north)

- Coordinates: 34°59′24″S 138°34′34″E
- Country: Australia
- State: South Australia
- City: Adelaide
- LGA: City of Mitcham
- Established: 1989

Government
  - State electorate: Elder
  - Federal division: Boothby

Population
  - Total: 2,319 (SAL 2021)
- Postcode: 5039
Suburbs around Melrose Park
Edwardstown	Clarence Gardens	Cumberland Park
Edwardstown	Melrose Park	Daw Park

Melrose Park is a suburb of Adelaide, South Australia in the City of Mitcham. It is bordered by South Road, Daws Road, Winston Avenue and Edward Street. Until 1989, Melrose Park was part of the suburb of Edwardstown. The name change occurred as the suburb was quite large, located on either side of South Road and was in the jurisdiction of two local government councils, with the larger western side belonging to the City of Marion. The suburb was named after early South Australian aviator, Charles James Melrose.

== Demographics ==
The 2021 Census by the Australian Bureau of Statistics counted 2,319 persons in Melrose Park on census night. Of these, 49.2% were male and 50.8% were female.

The most common countries of birth were Australia (75.7%), the United Kingdom (3.1%), China (2.4%), Nepal (2.1%) and India (2.1%).

The most common languages used at home were English only (75.9%), Greek (4.2%), Mandarin (2.9%) and Nepali (2.1%). Other languages used at home by more than 20 residents were Punjabi, Sinhalese and Italian.

27 people (1.2%) identified as Aboriginal and/or Torres Strait Islander.

The age distribution of Melrose Park residents is slightly older than that of the Australian population as a whole. At the 2021 Census, 29.0% of Melrose Park residents were aged 24 years or younger (Australia: 30.2%), and 18.1% were aged 65 years or older (Australia: 17.2%).

== Politics ==
=== Local government ===
Melrose Park is part of Overton Ward in the local government area of the City of Mitcham. Melrose Park is represented on Council by Khamal Bhagat and Jane Bange.

=== State and federal governments ===
Melrose Park lies in the state electoral district of Elder and the federal electoral division of Boothby. The suburb is represented in the South Australian House of Assembly by Nadia Clancy and federally by Louise Miller-Frost.
