= Goodwood, South Australia =

Goodwood
- Suburb
- Goodwood Road, looking north in 2026

- Interactive map of Goodwood
- Country: Australia
- State: South Australia
- City: Adelaide
- LGA: City of Unley
- Location: 3 km (1.9 mi) from Adelaide
- Established: 1849

Government
  - State electorate: Unley
  - Federal division: Adelaide

Population
  - Total: 2,823 (SAL 2021)
- Postcode: 5034
Suburbs around Goodwood
Keswick	Wayville	Unley
Forestville	Goodwood	Unley
Millswood	Millswood	Hyde Park

Goodwood is an inner southern suburb of the city of Adelaide, South Australia. It neighbours the Royal Adelaide Showgrounds and its major precinct is Goodwood Road.

== History ==
The original land surveyed of 1839 was granted to the South Australian Company and named Goodwood. Two other sections of land had been sold to settler Thomas Hardy in May 1838, who sold it to his son, Arthur in 1841. The 1840 census shows that there was a Village of Goodwood with a population of 100, but the first registration of a contract for sale was not until 1846. In 1849, Arthur Hardy subdivided his property into a number of four acre blocks, naming it Goodwood Park. The Belair railway line also goes through the suburb as does the city to Glenelg tram line.

== Governance ==
Goodwood is in the City of Unley local government area. It straddles the boundary of the state electorates of Ashford and Unley. It is in the federal Division of Adelaide. Its postcode is 5034.

== Amenities ==
The suburb features several churches in its commercial district, which is also home to many shops, businesses and a library. The local state school is Goodwood Primary School. The Catholic Church in Goodwood bears the name "Holy Cross".

== See also ==
- Capri Theatre
- Electoral district of Goodwood
- Goodwood Institute
