= Hyde Park, South Australia =

Hyde Park
- Suburb
- Interactive map of Hyde Park
- Coordinates: 34.9569°S 138.603090°E
- Country: Australia
- State: South Australia
- City: Adelaide
- LGA: City of Unley
- Location: 3.5 km (2.2 mi) S of Adelaide city centre

Government
  - State electorate: Unley
  - Federal division: Adelaide

Area
  - Total: 0.6 km^{2} (0.23 sq mi)
- Elevation: 46 m (151 ft)

Population
  - Total: 1,660 (SAL 2021)
- Postcode: 5061
Suburbs around Hyde Park
Goodwood	Goodwood; Unley	Unley
Millswood	Hyde Park	Malvern
Unley Park	Unley Park	Malvern

Hyde Park is an affluent inner-southern suburb of Adelaide in the City of Unley.

It features King William Road, a popular shopping and dining destination in Adelaide. Considered an upper class suburb, it is home to some of Adelaide's most oldest, expensive and luxurious properties. Millswood railway station and the Belair railway line are close to Hyde Park. Until the 1950s a tram line ran to Hyde Park.

Politically, the suburb is safe for the Liberal Party of Australia; at the 2010 election, it attracted 62.33% of the primary vote.

Hyde Park "did not derive its name, as many suppose, from the famous Hyde Park, of London, but from a gentleman named John Hyde, who came to [Australia] in 1839"

== Population ==
In the 2021 Census, there were 1,660 people in Hyde Park. 72.6% of people were born in Australia and 81.1% of people spoke only English at home. The most common responses for religion were No Religion 43.7%, Catholic 19.5% and Anglican 11.8%.

== See also ==
- Hyde Park (disambiguation)
