= Clarence Gardens, South Australia =

Clarence Gardens
- Suburb
- Coordinates: 34°58′19″S 138°34′41″E
- Country: Australia
- State: South Australia
- City: Adelaide
- LGA: City of Mitcham

Government
  - State electorate: Elder
  - Federal division: Boothby

Population
  - Total: 2,373 (SAL 2021)
- Postcode: 5039
Suburbs around Clarence Gardens
Glandore	Black Forest & Clarence Park	Clarence Park
Edwardstown	Clarence Gardens	Cumberland Park
Edwardstown	Melrose Park	Daw Park

Clarence Gardens is an inner southern suburb of Metropolitan Adelaide, South Australia in the City of Mitcham, 4.6 kilometres south of the City Centre.

It is bounded to the north by Cross Road, the west by South Road, the east by Winston Avenue and the south by Edward Street.

There are many sporting venues in Clarence Gardens which include the Clarence Gardens Lawn Bowls club and the Clarence Gardens Rugby club, both of which are in the A.A. Bailey Recreational Ground facility.

Clarence Gardens Post Office opened on 1 August 1946. It was renamed Clarence Gardens North in 1967 on the same day Edwardstown office (open since 1850) was renamed Clarence Gardens. The Clarence Gardens North office closed in 1980 and Clarence Gardens reverted to Edwardstown in 1987.
