= Daw Park, South Australia =

Daw Park
- Suburb
- Coordinates: 34°58′52″S 138°35′17″E
- Country: Australia
- State: South Australia
- City: Adelaide
- LGA: City of Mitcham, Overton Ward

Government
  - State electorate: Elder
  - Federal division: Boothby

Population
  - Total: 2,705 (SAL 2021)
- Postcode: 5041
Suburbs around Daw Park
Clarence Gardens	Cumberland Park	Westbourne Park
Melrose Park	Daw Park	Colonel Light Gardens
St Marys	Pasadena	Panorama

Daw Park is an inner southern suburb of Adelaide, South Australia, in the local government area of the City of Mitcham. The suburb is divided into two parts, with a smaller northern exclave separated from the larger southern part by a section of Colonel Light Gardens. The smaller northern exclave is surrounded by the suburbs of Colonel Light Gardens to the south and east, Cumberland Park to the north and Melrose Park to the west. The southern exclave is surrounded by Pasadena to the south, Melrose Park to the west, and Colonel Light Gardens to the north and east.

Daw Park is part of the South Australian House of Assembly electoral district of Elder and the House of Representatives Division of Boothby.

== Places of interest ==
- Repatriation General Hospital – formerly provided care to veterans.
