= Unley Park, South Australia =

Unley Park
- Suburb
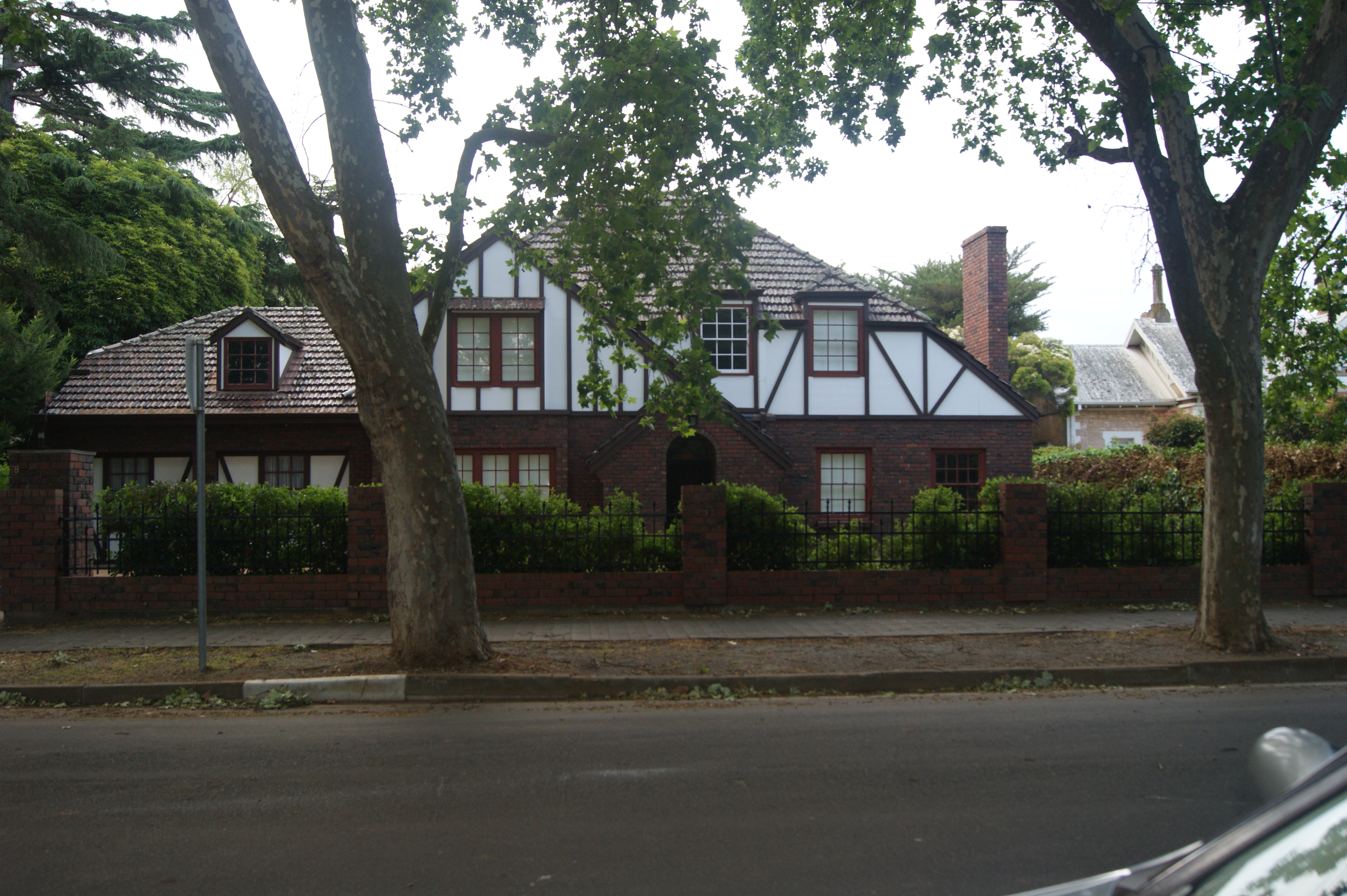
- Residential home in the Tudorbethan architectural style

- Interactive map of Unley Park
- Country: Australia
- State: South Australia
- City: Adelaide
- LGA: City of Unley
- Location: 5.5 km (3.4 mi) S of Adelaide
- Established: 1840

Government
  - State electorate: Unley
  - Federal division: Adelaide

Area
  - Total: 0.8 km^{2} (0.31 sq mi)
- Elevation: 57 m (187 ft)

Population
  - Total: 1,383 (SAL 2021)
- Postcode: 5061
Suburbs around Unley Park
Millswood	Hyde Park	Malvern
Kings Park	Unley Park	Malvern
Westbourne Park	Hawthorn	Kingswood

Unley Park is a southern suburb of Adelaide in the City of Unley. Its postcode is 5061.

It is located on the north side of Cross Road and east of the Belair railway line. Access via public transport is from the Unley Park railway station, Millswood railway station and the Unley Road "Go Zone".

A feature of the district is Victoria Avenue—Adelaide's wealthiest street, containing many houses built between the two World Wars.

Politically, the suburb is very safe for the Liberal Party, and is located in the Division of Adelaide. At the 2025 federal election landslide, the Liberals won just two of the 400+ metropolitan election-day booths across the seven Adelaide-based seats — Myrtle Bank in the Division of Sturt, and Unley Park in the Division of Adelaide.

== History ==
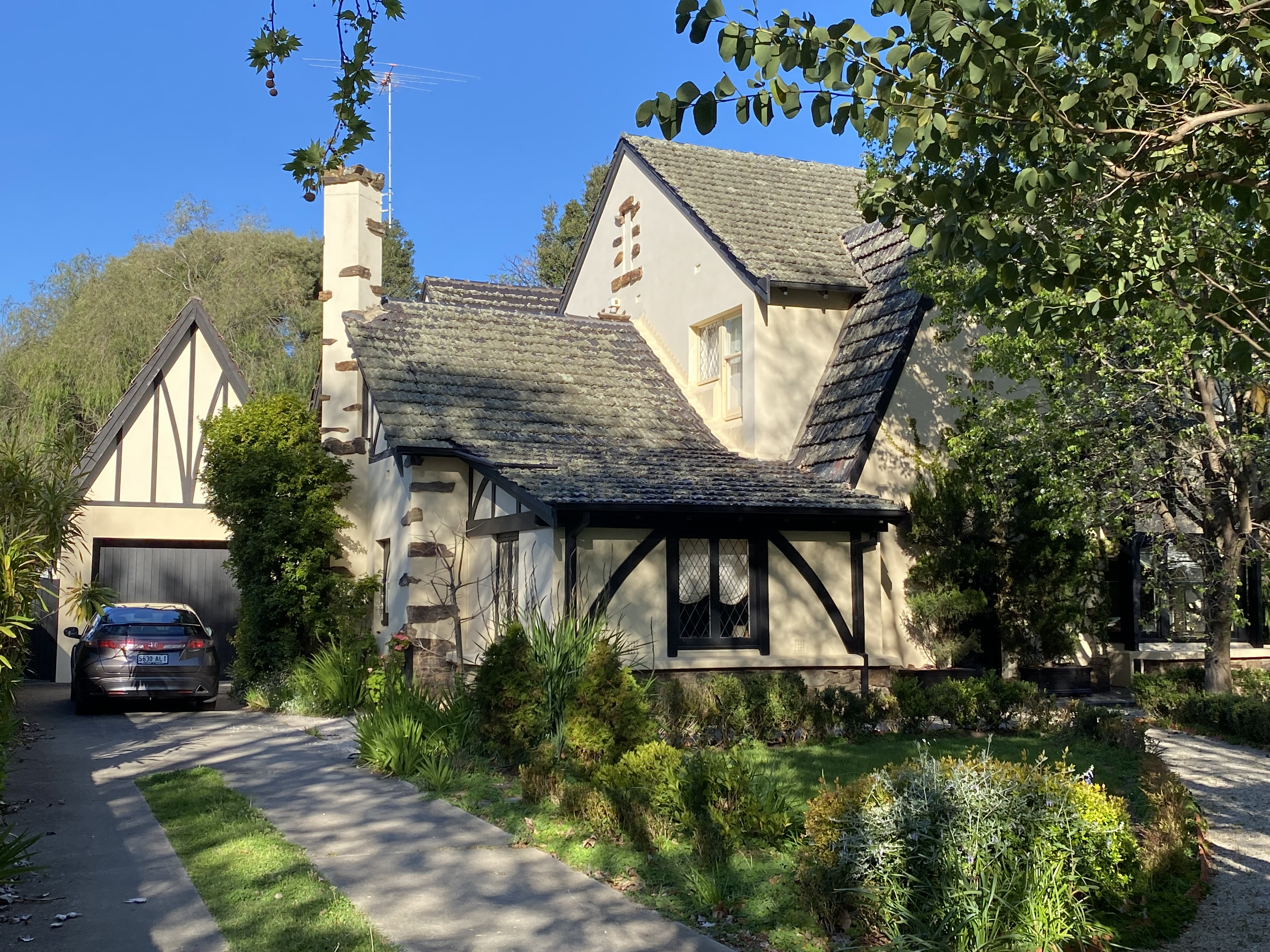
Tudor Revival house in Unley Park

Unley Park Post Office opened on 2 January 1946 and closed in 1999.

Two historic private schools were located on Thornber Street, Unley Park: Kyre College (which was the nucleus of Scotch College) at number 4, and Mrs. Thornber's School, later associated with Tormore House School, at number 39. Both were dissolved early in the 20th century.

== See also ==
- Heywood Park
