= Castle Plaza =

- Location: Edwardstown, Adelaide, South Australia, Australia
- Coordinates: 34.9816°S 138.5727°E
- Address: 992 South Road
- Opened: July 1987; 39 years ago
- Manager: Vicinity Centres
- Num. of stores: 72
- Num. of anchor tenants: 4
- Floors: 1
- Website: www.castleplaza.com.au

Castle Plaza is a shopping centre located in the Adelaide suburb of Edwardstown, South Australia approximately 7 km (4.3 mi) from the CBD, along South Road.

It was expanded in the mid-1980s and the new development was opened in July 1987. Attending that day were a number of local personalities including John Platten. Providing the guard of honour were the 1st Ascot Park Scout Group.

It contains three major tenants (Target, Coles, Foodland Supermarkets) and the Castle Tavern (including gaming room) as well as about 66 specialty stores, plus two free standing fast food outlets.

In July 2007, owners CFS Retail Property Trust announced that they had purchased the Hills Industries site (7.78 hectares) directly opposite Castle Plaza (north side of Raglan Avenue) for $25.3 million and that there were plans for a further $80 million retail development on this site subject to approval by City of Marion Council.
