= Cumberland Park, South Australia =

Cumberland Park
- Suburb
- Coordinates: 34°58′05″S 138°35′28″E
- Country: Australia
- State: South Australia
- City: Adelaide
- LGA: City of Mitcham
- Location: 5 km (3.1 mi) from Adelaide city centre

Government
  - State electorate: Elder
  - Federal division: Boothby

Area
  - Total: 6.4 km^{2} (2.5 sq mi)

Population
  - Total: 2,571 (SAL 2021)
- Postcode: 5041
Suburbs around Cumberland Park
Black Forest	Clarence Park	Kings Park
Clarence Gardens	Cumberland Park	Westbourne Park
Melrose Park	Daw Park	Colonel Light Gardens

Cumberland Park is an inner-southern suburb of Adelaide, South Australia in the City of Mitcham.

== Location ==
Located at 34.97°S 138.59°E, it is 58 m above mean sea level, and about 5 km south of the Adelaide city centre. The suburb's borders are Cross Road (north), Goodwood Road (east), Edward Street (south) and Winston Avenue (west). It is diagonally opposite Colonel Light Gardens (to the south-east) and Kings Park (to the north-east), and adjoins Westbourne Park (east), Clarence Gardens (west) and Clarence Park (north).

== History ==
Historically, the region was vast farmland with no residential occupation. The site on which Cabra Dominican College currently stands was farmland up until the school's development in the early 1900s.

== Shopping ==
Cumberland Park is mainly a residential suburb, with a number of shops and businesses along Goodwood Road. These include a Big W with an adjoining Woolworths supermarket on the Cross Road corner. The shopping centre, which opened in the 1970s, was redeveloped in 2013.

A notable tenant in the corner of that car park, diagonally opposite McDonald's, was, for many years, The Welsh Cafe, possibly Australia's only Welsh eating place. It closed in early 2013.

Cumberland Park Post Office opened on 1 November 1993, replacing the Clarence Park Post Office. It closed in 2011.

== Schools ==
Cabra Dominican College, a private Catholic coeducational college that serves grades seven to twelve, once administered by the Dominican Nuns, is located on Cross Road.

== Housing ==
The median price for a 3 bedroom house based on 17 sales in the period May 2016 to May 2017 was $658,000.
The median price for a 3 bedroom house based on 18 sales in the period Feb 2017 to Feb 2018 was $695,000.
