= Clarence Park, South Australia =

Clarence Park
- Suburb
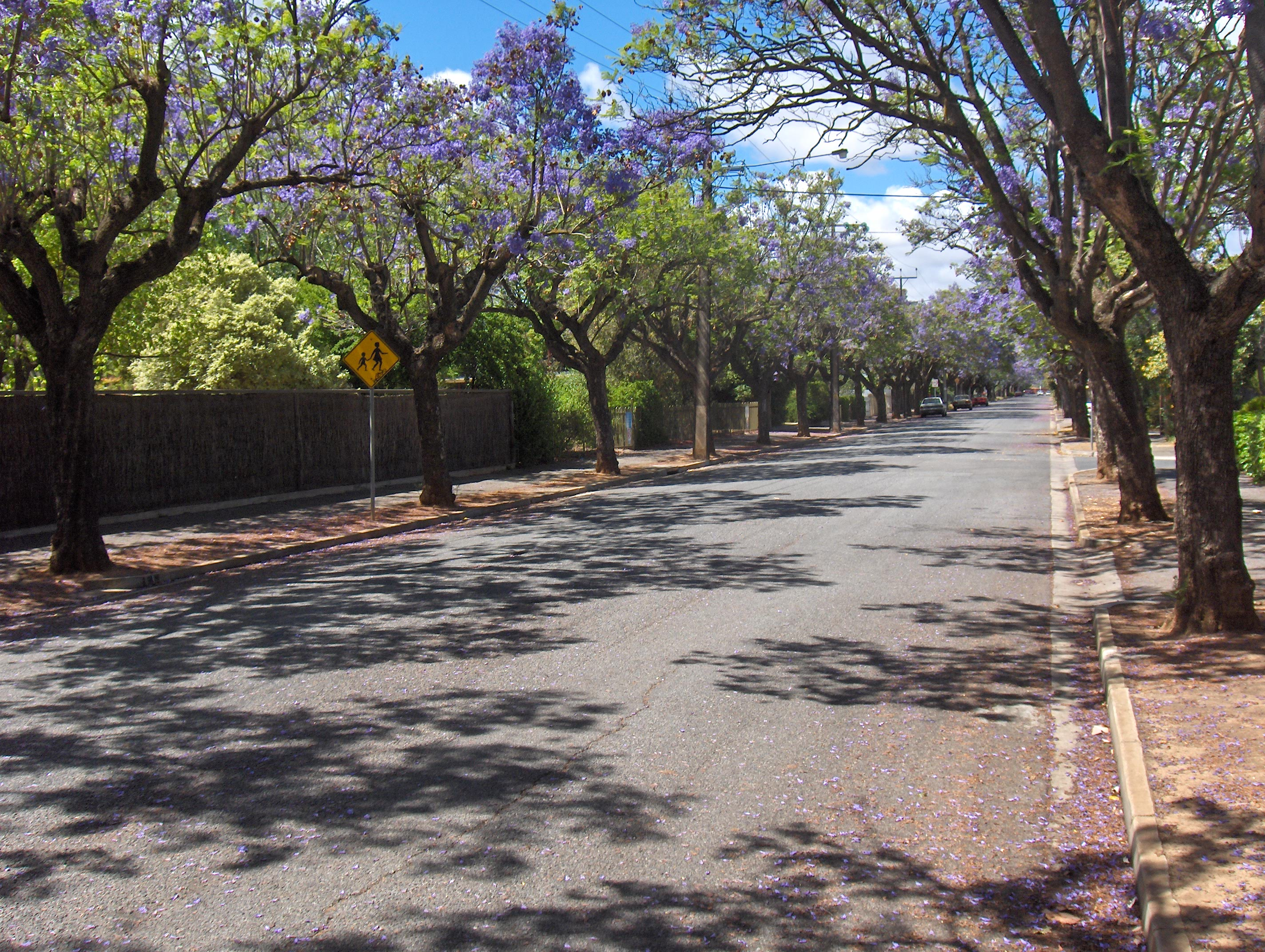
- Churchill Avenue, looking south towards Cross Road

- Interactive map of Clarence Park
- Coordinates: 34°57′47″S 138°35′10″E
- Country: Australia
- State: South Australia
- City: Adelaide
- LGA: City of Unley
- Location: 4 km (2.5 mi) from Adelaide
- Established: 1892

Government
  - State electorate: Elder
  - Federal division: Boothby

Population
  - Total: 2,658 (SAL 2021)
- Postcode: 5034
Suburbs around Clarence Park
Black Forest	Black Forest and Millswood	Millswood
Black Forest and Glandore	Clarence Park	Kings Park
Edwardstown	Clarence Gardens and Cumberland Park	Westbourne Park

Clarence Park (formerly Goodwood South) is an inner southern suburb of Adelaide, South Australia in the City of Unley. Its borders are Mills Street (north), Goodwood Road (east), Cross Road (south) and the Seaford railway line (north-west).

== History ==
Goodwood Park Post Office opened on 27 December 1877, was renamed Goodwood South in 1884, Clarence Park in 1910 and was replaced by a new Cumberland Park office in 1993.

== Facilities ==
The Clarence Park Community Centre is located just over the train line on East Avenue, in the suburb of Black Forest. The centre caters for many clubs, provides courses, and is adjacent to the Clarence Park Biodiversity Garden. Clarence Park Community Kindergarten is located on Parker Terrace in Clarence Park, offering kindergarten and playgroup to the local community.
