= Millswood, South Australia =

Millswood
- Suburb
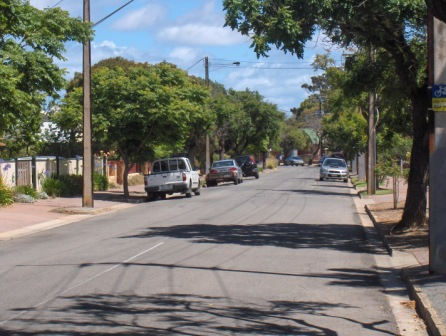
- Millswood Crescent, looking towards the south-west

- Interactive map of Millswood
- Country: Australia
- State: South Australia
- City: Adelaide
- LGA: City of Unley
- Location: 5 km (3.1 mi) S of Adelaide

Government
  - State electorates: Badcoe; Unley
  - Federal divisions: Adelaide; Boothby
- Elevation: 44 m (144 ft)

Population
  - Total: 2,173 (SAL 2021)
- Postcode: 5034
Suburbs around Millswood
| Forestville | Forestville & Goodwood | Unley |
| Black Forest | Millswood | Hyde Park |
| Clarence Park | Clarence Park, Kings Park & Unley Park | Unley Park |

Millswood is an inner-southern mainly residential suburb of Adelaide in the City of Unley. It was named after Scotsman Samuel Mills, who arrived in the colony in 1839.

== Description ==
The suburb is dissected by Goodwood Road, which travels north to the Adelaide city centre from the southern suburb of Pasadena. On the west side of Goodwood Road it is surrounded by the suburbs of Goodwood, Forestville, Black Forest and Clarence Park. On the east side of Goodwood Road it is surrounded by the suburbs of Goodwood, Hyde Park, Unley Park and Kings Park.

At the northern edge of the west side of the suburb, the Adelaide-Goodwood railway line forks with the Seaford railway line going south-west and the Belair railway line going south-east. Millswood railway station, located on the Belair line, on the southern edge of the suburb, was closed in 1995 but reopened in 2014.

Goodwood Road passes under the railway line in a deep underpass, known as the Goodwood Subway, which often floods during heavy rain.

Within the triangle formed by the railway fork and Millswood Crescent are the SASMEE ( South Australian Society of Model & Experimental Engineers) Park and the Millswood croquet, lawn bowls and lawn tennis clubs. The Goodwood Oval and grandstand, with playground, barbecue facilities, soccer pitch and grandstand, cricket practice nets, and eight hard tennis courts, are located to the west of the fork in the railway line.

The former Goodwood Orphanage and the surrounding Orphanage Park are located on the south-east corner of Goodwood Road and Mitchell Street and now houses Tabor College Australia.

== History ==
Millswood was named after Scotsman Samuel Mills, who arrived in the colony in 1839 and owned a property called Ravenswood Farm.

In 1917, Hackett's Nursery, a family-run business then in Marryatville, was sold to a limited company, E. & W. Hackett Limited, with the Hacketts continuing as directors. In the same year the business bought a 6-acre (2.4 ha) plot in the Millswood Estate for over £20,067 to accommodate the nursery, which drew glowing praise in a 1923 newspaper article and continued to do business there until 1952.

== Gallery ==
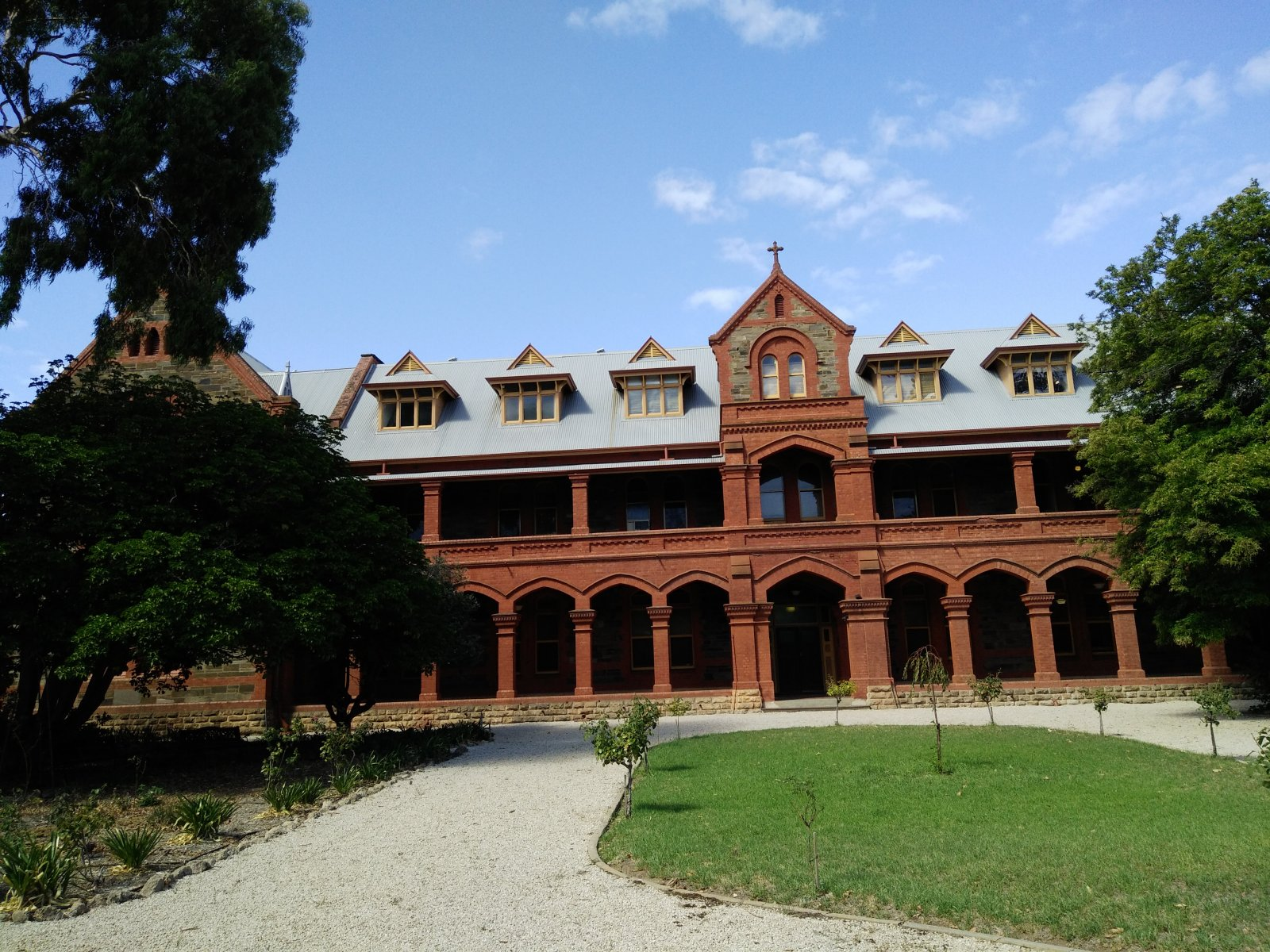
The former Goodwood Orphanage

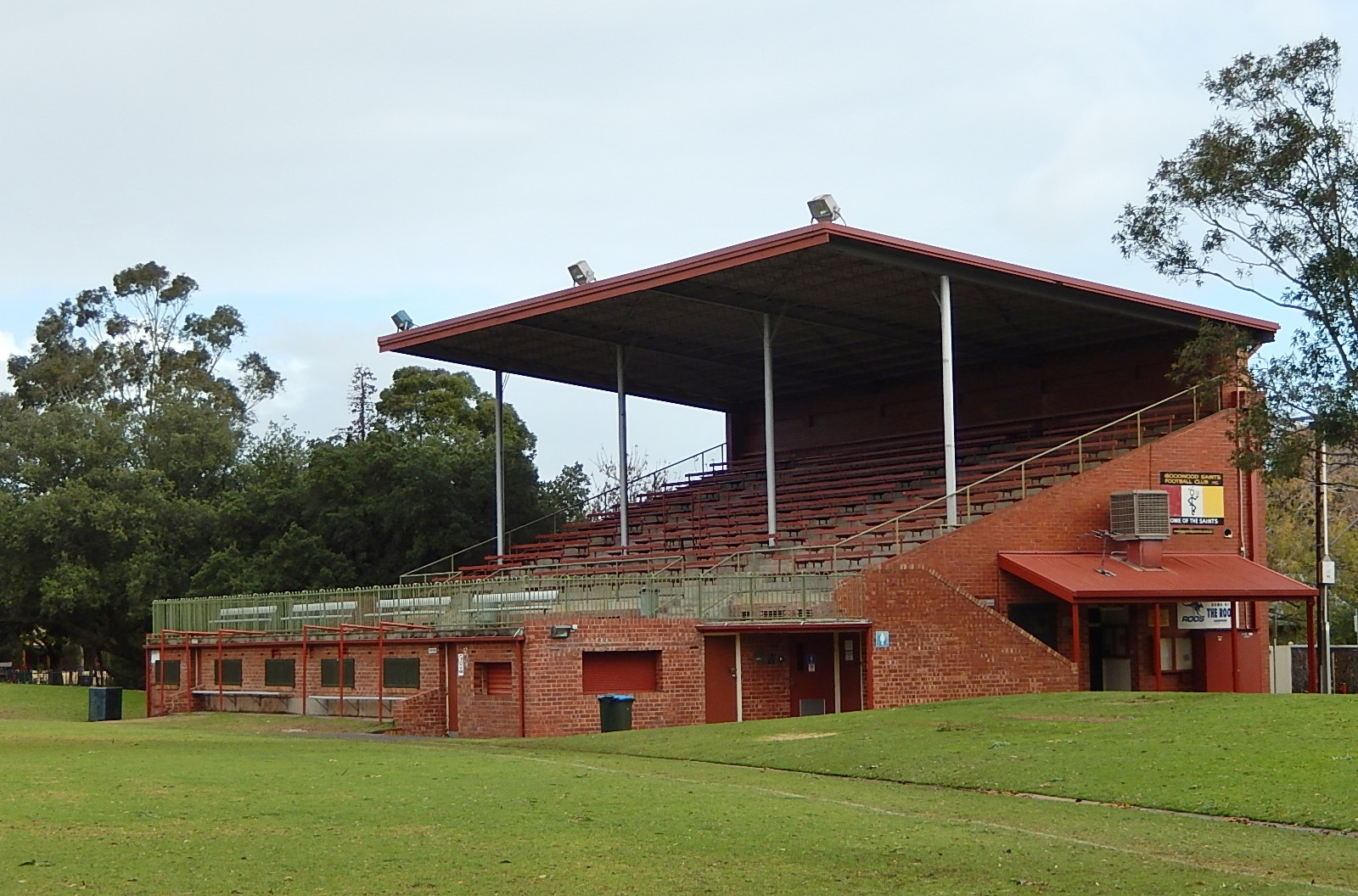
Goodwood Oval Grandstand

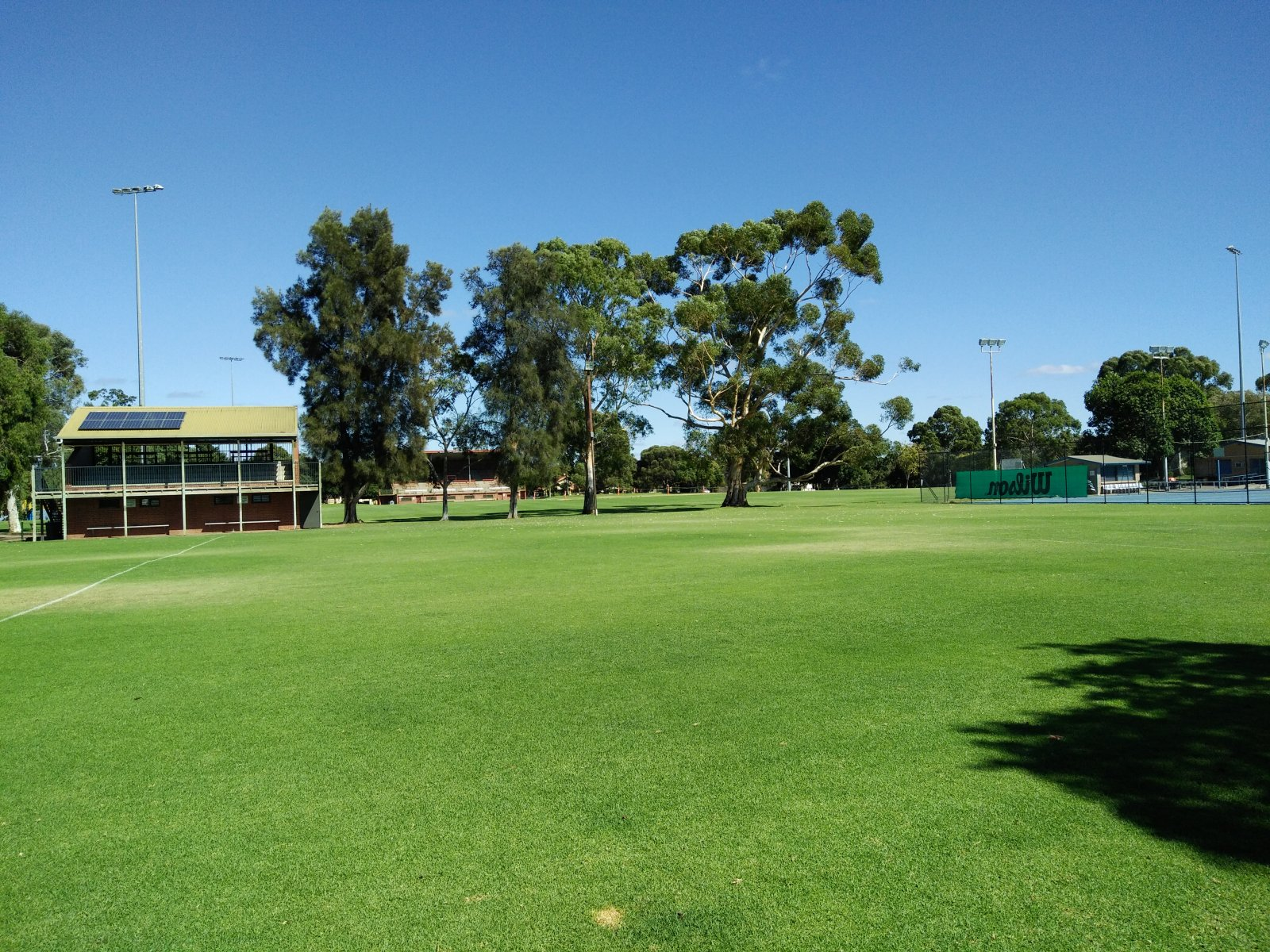
Goodwood Oval

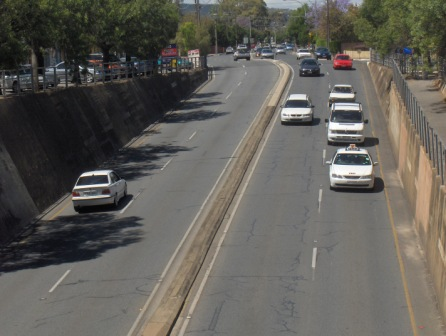
Goodwood Subway – from the railway bridge

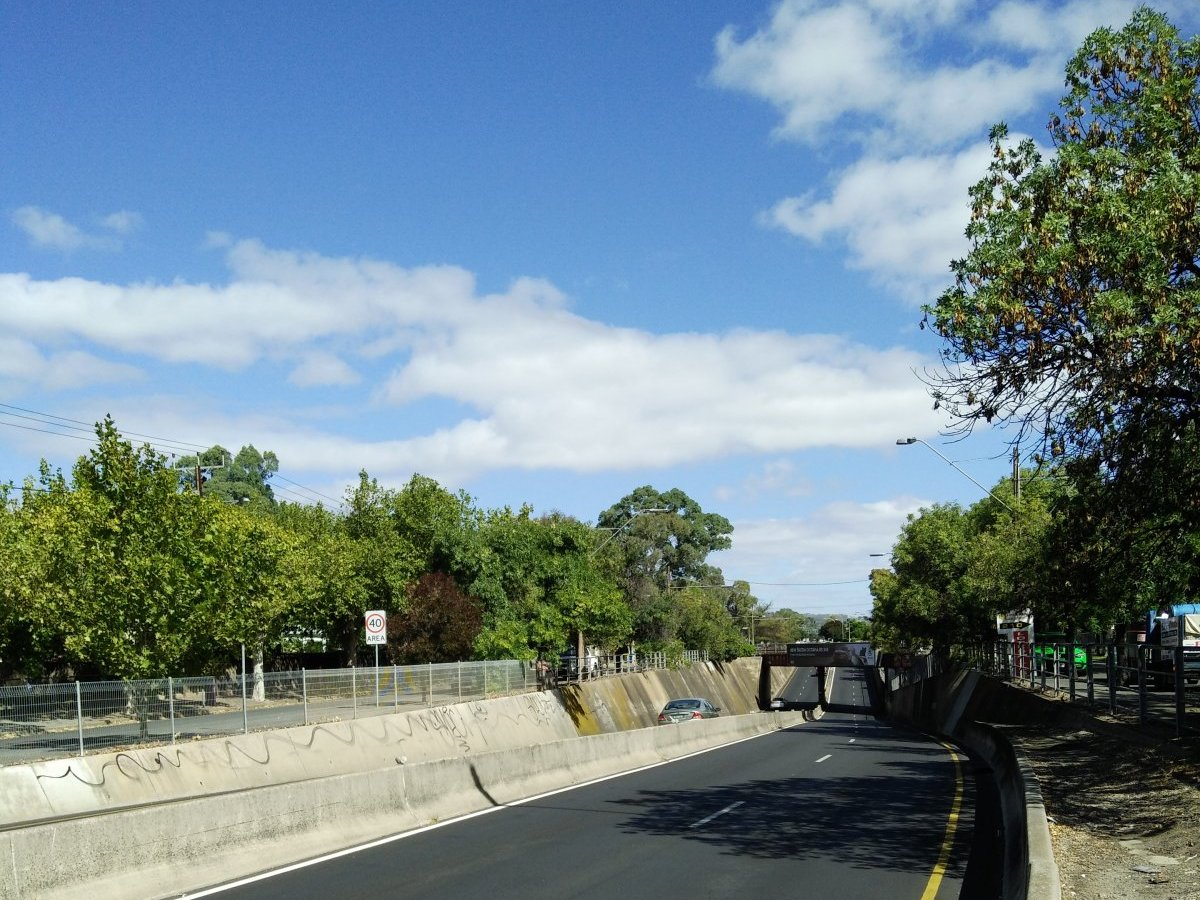
Goodwood Subway – from Goodwood Road

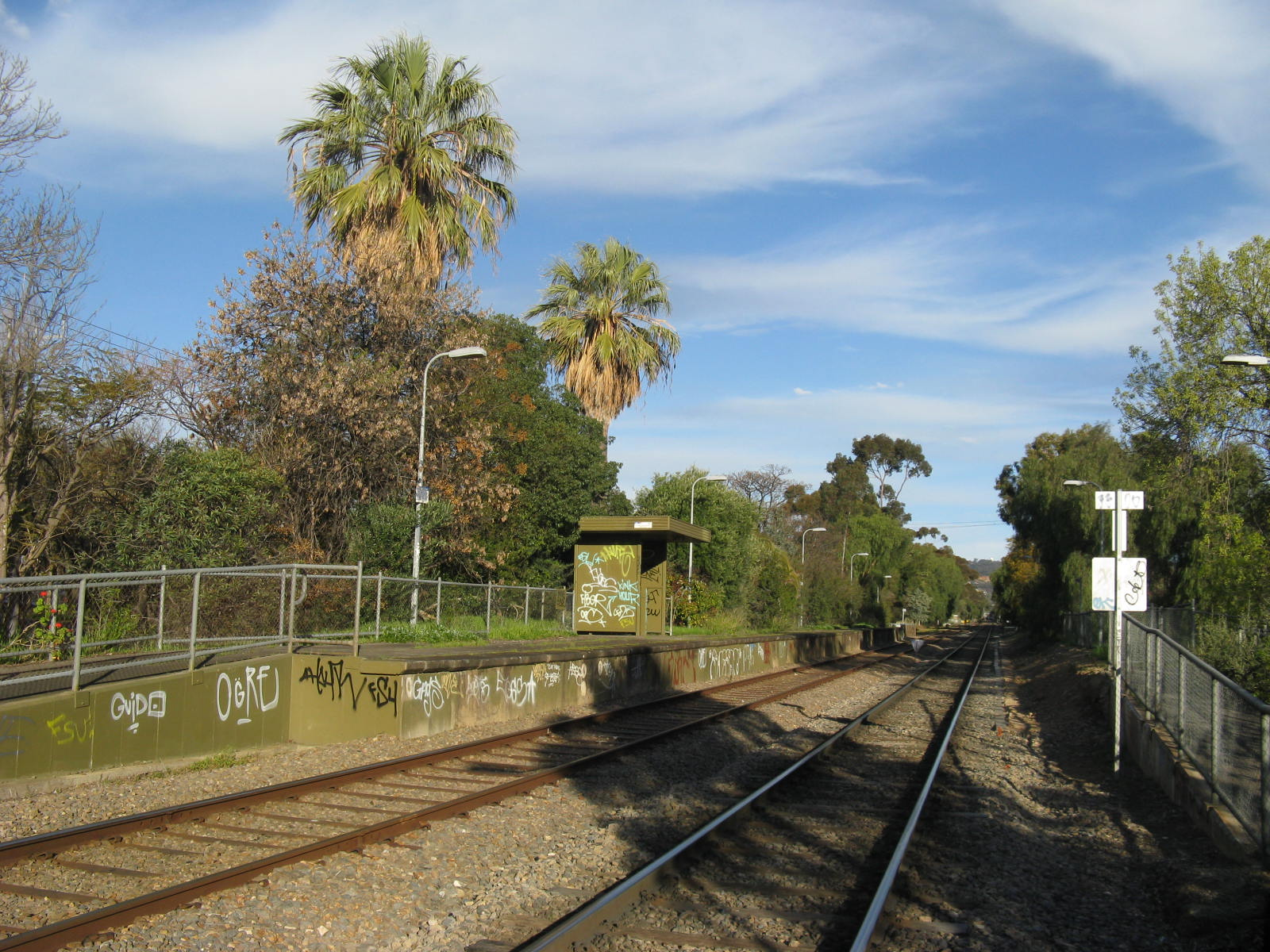
(Closed) Millswood Railway station in 2008

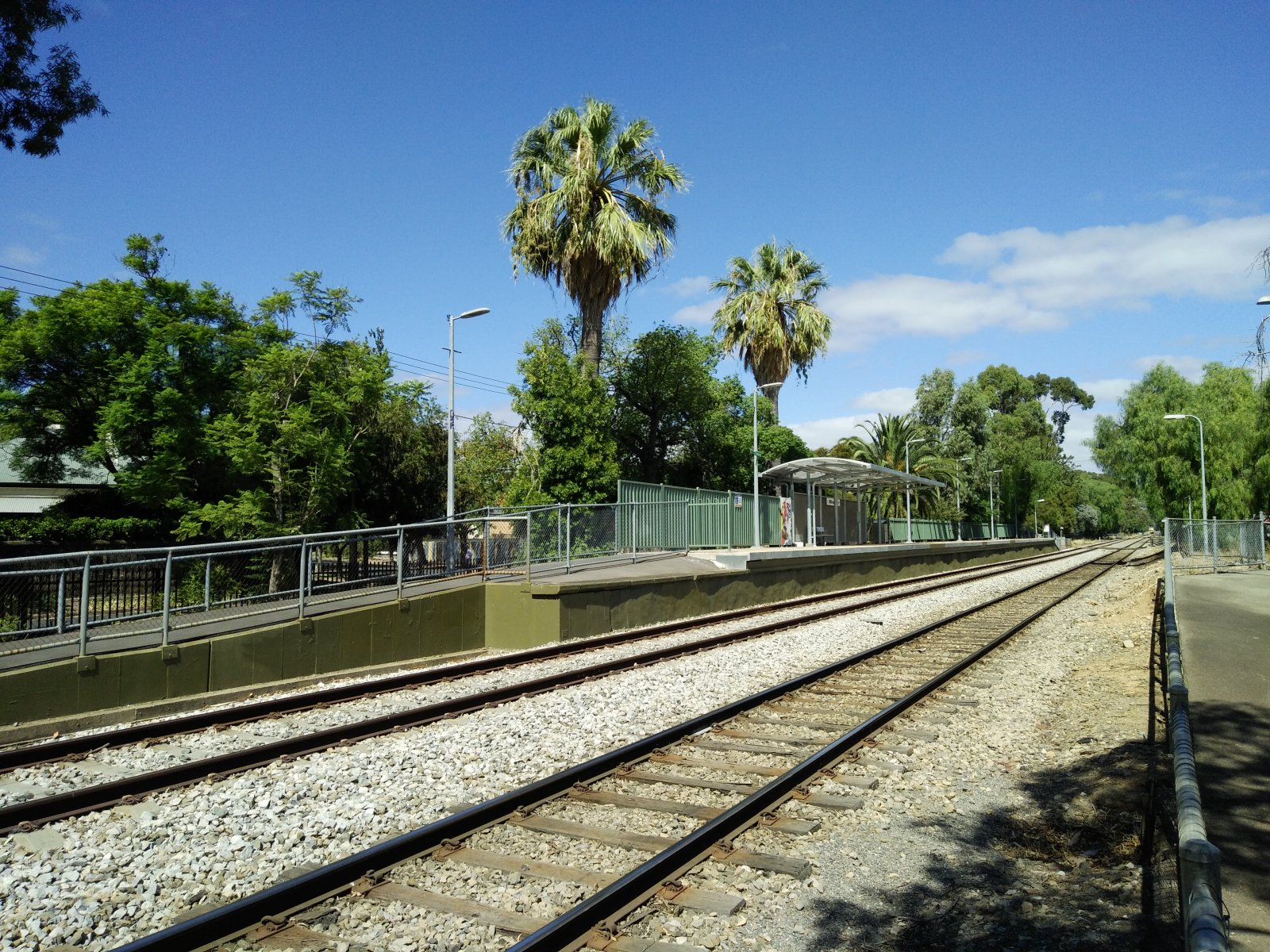
Millswood Railway station in 2018
