= Kings Park, South Australia =

Kings Park
- Suburb
- Interactive map of Kings Park
- Coordinates: 34°57′50″S 138°35′35″E
- Country: Australia
- State: South Australia
- City: Adelaide
- LGA: City of Unley
- Location: 4.5 km (2.8 mi) south of Adelaide city centre
- Established: 1905

Government
  - State electorate: Unley
  - Federal division: Boothby

Population
  - Total: 574 (SAL 2021)
- Postcode: 5034
Suburbs around Kings Park
Millswood	Millswood & Unley Park	Unley Park
Clarence Park	Kings Park	Unley Park
Cumberland Park	Westbourne Park	Hawthorn

Kings Park is a small, triangular-shaped suburb of Adelaide. It is the most tightly held suburb in South Australia with a turnover of properties of just 1.3 percent. Located in the City of Unley it is serviced by both the Millswood railway station on the northern boundary of the suburb and the Unley Park railway station on the southeast corner of the suburb.
