= Glandore, South Australia =

Glandore
- Suburb
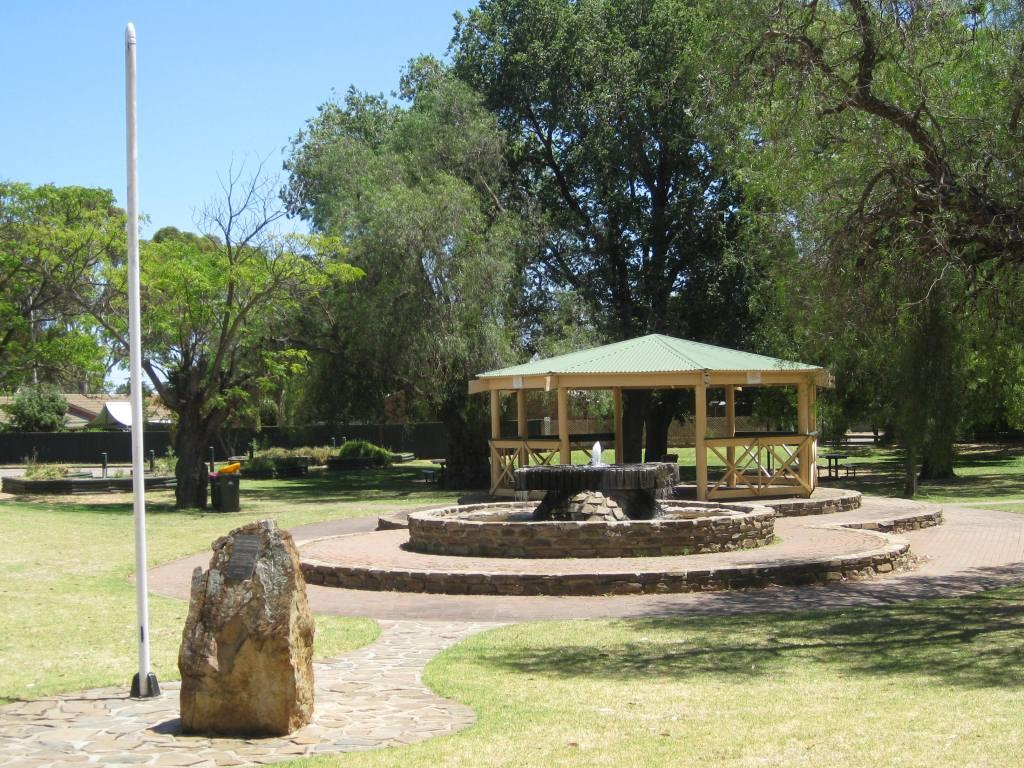
- Fountain and rotunda located on the grounds of the Glandore Community Centre

- Country: Australia
- State: South Australia
- City: Adelaide
- LGAs: City of Marion; City of West Torrens
- Location: 4 km (2.5 mi) from Adelaide

Government
  - State electorate: Badcoe
  - Federal divisions: Adelaide; Boothby

Population
  - Total: 3,041 (SAL 2021)
- Postcode: 5037
Suburbs around Glandore
Plympton	Kurralta Park	Ashford, Everard Park
Plympton, South Plympton	Glandore	Everard Park Black Forest Clarence Park
South Plympton	Edwardstown	Clarence Gardens

Glandore is a suburb of Adelaide, South Australia, partly in the City of Marion and partly in the City of West Torrens.

== History ==
Kaurna people had inhabited the Adelaide Plains for thousands of years before the colonisation of South Australia in 1836.

The name is believed to come from the village of Glandore in County Cork, Ireland, whence the family of John O'Dea, one of the original property owners of the area, came.

The City of Marion section of Glandore was originally named Edwardstown.

The site at 25 Naldera Street, now (2025) Glandore Community Centre, has at different times in its history been the site of a number of institutions: Edwardstown Girls Reformatory (1891–1898); Edwardstown Industrial School (1898–1949); Glandore Industrial School (1949–1958); Glandore Children's Home (1958–1966); renamed Glandore Boys' Home in 1966, eventually being closed on 4 February 1973. The Windana Remand Home (1965–1975), a correctional facility for young males, was located within the grounds of the Glandore Boys Home. A school for Aboriginal children, the forerunner to the present Warriappendi Secondary School at Thebarton, occupied this site in the early 1980s.

== Description and facilities ==
Glandore lies south-west of Adelaide, halfway between the beachside suburb of Glenelg and the central business district. It is bordered by Anzac Highway (north), Cross Road (south), South Road (east), and Beckman Street and Winifred Avenue (west). Suburbs surrounding Glandore include Edwardstown, Black Forest, Everard Park, Kurralta Park and Plympton. The Glenelg tram line runs through the middle of the suburb with stations at South Road, Burke Street and Beckman Street. North of the tramline, Glandore is in the City of West Torrens local government area, and south of the tramline, it forms part of the City of Marion.

A number of parks are located within the suburb boundaries, including Glandore Oval, Jubilee Park and the shared grounds of the Glandore Community Centre, Coast FM radio station, and Community Centres SA.

== Tram stop ==
Glandore is also the location of a stop on the Glenelg tram line.

Preceding station	Adelaide Metro	Following station
South Road towards Royal Adelaide Hospital, Adelaide Entertainment Centre or Festival Plaza	Glenelg tram line	Beckman Street towards Moseley Square
