= Westbourne Park, South Australia =

Westbourne Park
- Suburb
- Coordinates: 34°58′11″S 138°35′45″E
- Country: Australia
- State: South Australia
- City: Adelaide
- LGA: City of Mitcham
- Established: 1882

Government
  - State electorate: Elder
  - Federal division: Boothby

Area
  - Total: 0.9 km^{2} (0.35 sq mi)

Population
  - Total: 2,564 (SAL 2021)
- Postcode: 5041
Suburbs around Westbourne Park
Clarence Park	Kings Park	Unley Park
Cumberland Park	Westbourne Park	Hawthorn
Daw Park	Colonel Light Gardens	Lower Mitcham

Westbourne Park is an inner southern suburb of Adelaide, the State capital of South Australia. The suburb was named after Westbourne, a village in Sussex, England, and was laid out in 1881.

Located in the City of Mitcham, the suburb's boundaries are Cross Road, Goodwood Road, Grange Road, Sussex Terrace and the Belair train line.

== History ==
The suburb was originally known as Cottonville and Unley Park. The area was largely built up in the first three decades of the twentieth century, partly due to its proximity to the (no longer existent) Colonel Light Gardens Tram Line. The tree-lined streets contain a large proportion of houses from this era. These range from Queen Anne and Mock Tudor houses to symmetrical buildings and Californian bungalows built mainly in red brick.

The southern area was first laid out as "homestead blocks" but was not gazetted. It was then known as Cottonville, and it is probable that it was named after George W. Cotton who advocated the division of land into small holdings for "the working man". Much of the land was used as almond orchards. A Blockers' sports day and picnic was reported in the Register of 13 April 1896 and the Chronicle of 18 April 1896.

The southernmost section around Constance Street to Angas Road was laid out as housing blocks by William Hamilton Sampson and Jessie Sanders in 1921 and was still known as Cottonville.

The northern part was originally a private subdivision of Section 253. The name Westbourne Park was formally submitted by the City of Mitcham at a council meeting held in 1945, and to help eliminate superfluous subdivision names, (as requested by the Surveyor-General), Cottonville was included. The Westbourne Park Post Office opened on 10 February 1947 but was renamed Hawthorn in 1966.

== Transport ==
Approximately 6 kilometres (3.7 mi) south of the Adelaide city centre, the suburb is serviced on the east side by Adelaide Metro's Belair railway line and the 200 bus route along Sussex Terrace. Bus routes G10, G20, G30, G40, 961 and 997 along Goodwood Road service the west side of the suburb. Service 190 connects the southern boundary along Grange Road to Glenelg (via Raglan Ave) and the city (via Belair Road).

== Schools ==
Westbourne Park Primary School is located on Goodwood Road on the western boundary of the suburb.

== Politics ==
- Local government: Gault Ward in the City of Mitcham
- State government: Electoral district of Elder in the South Australian House of Assembly
- Federal government: Division of Boothby in the Australian House of Representatives

== See also ==
- List of Adelaide suburbs
- List of Adelaide obsolete suburb names
