= Forestville, South Australia =

Forestville
- Suburb
- Interactive map of Forestville
- Coordinates: 34°57′04″S 138°34′52″E
- Country: Australia
- State: South Australia
- City: Adelaide
- LGA: City of Unley
- Location: 2 km (1.2 mi) from Adelaide

Government
  - State electorate: Badcoe
  - Federal divisions: Adelaide; Boothby

Population
  - Total: 1,400 (SAL 2021)
- Postcode: 5035
Suburbs around Forestville
Ashford	Keswick and Wayville	Wayville
Everard Park	Forestville	Goodwood
Black Forest	Black Forest and Millswood	Millswood

Forestville is an inner southwestern suburb of Adelaide in the City of Unley. It is traversed by Brown Hill Creek and the Glenelg tram line.

The prominent horse breeder William Harper Formby (1818–1892) was an early settler in the area, occupying much of Section 53 on the Bay Road.

Former NBL franchise and later Premier League club, the Forestville Eagles, are named after the suburb.

Forestville is also the location of a tram stop on the Glenelg tram line.

Preceding station	Adelaide Metro	Following station
Goodwood Road towards Royal Adelaide Hospital, Adelaide Entertainment Centre or Festival Plaza	Glenelg tram line	Black Forest towards Moseley Square
