= Black Forest, South Australia =

Black Forest
- Suburb
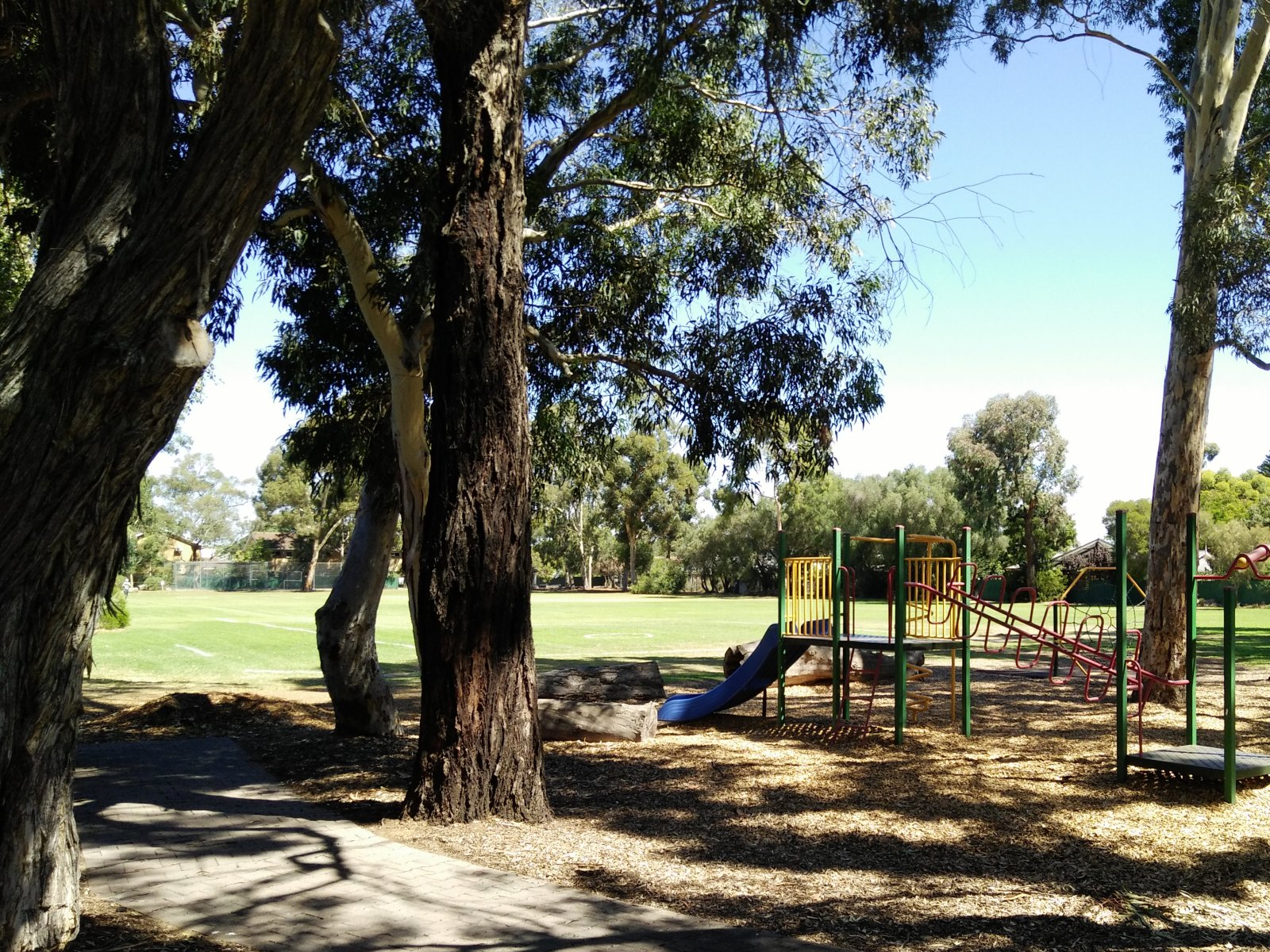
- Forest Avenue Reserve

- Interactive map of Black Forest
- Country: Australia
- State: South Australia
- City: Adelaide
- LGA: City of Unley
- Location: 4.7 km (2.9 mi) SW of Adelaide city centre
- Established: 1850

Government
  - State electorate: Badcoe
  - Federal division: Boothby

Area
  - Total: 1.63 km^{2} (0.63 sq mi)

Population
  - Total: 1,982 (SAL 2021)
- Postcode: 5035
Suburbs around Black Forest
Glandore	Everard Park and Forestville	Forestville
Glandore	Black Forest	Millswood
Edwardstown	Clarence Park	Clarence Park

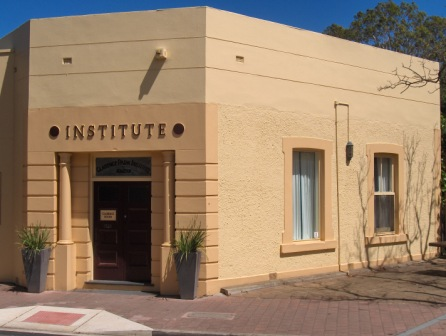
Entrance to the Clarence Park Community Centre

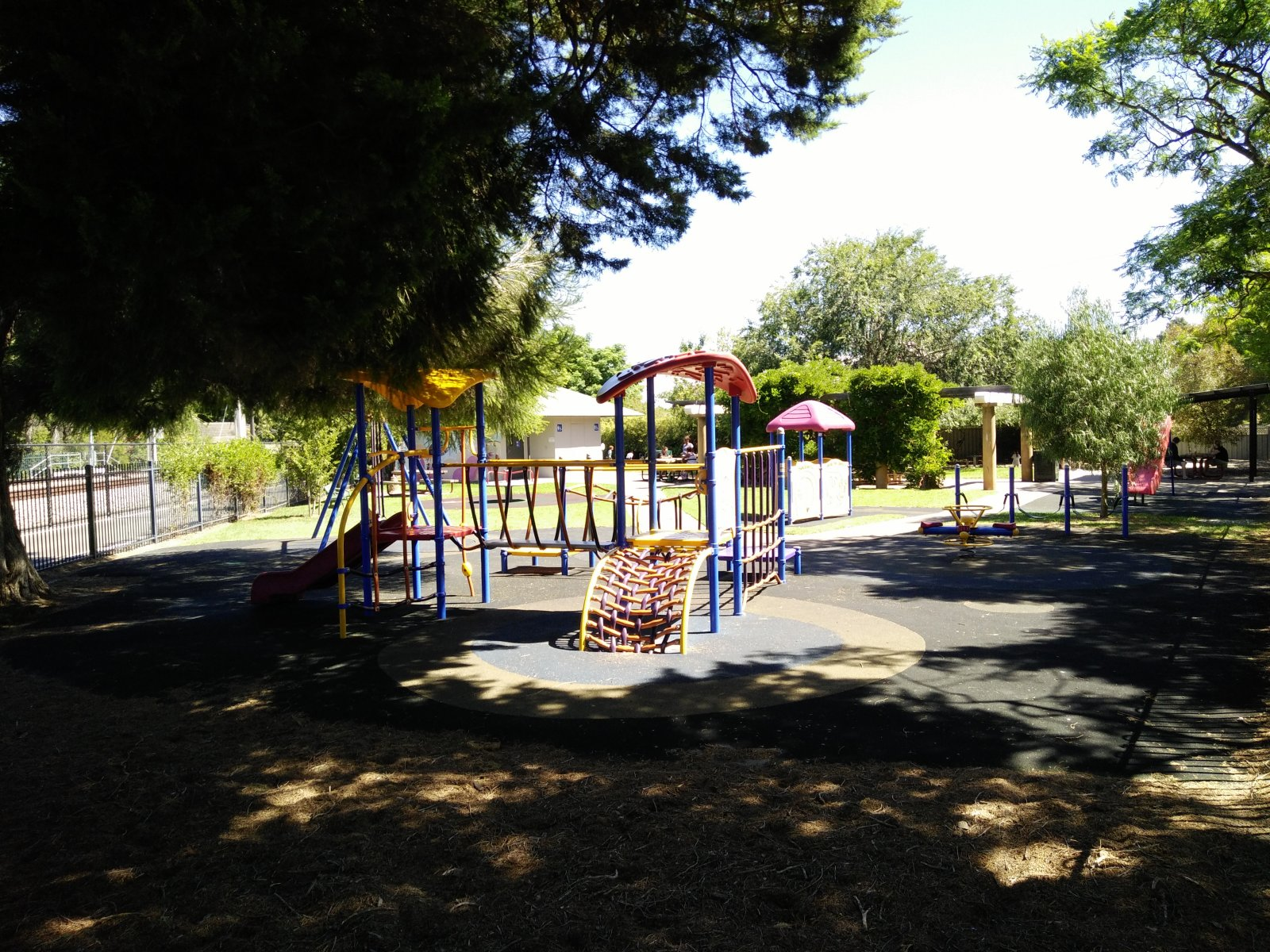
Princess Margaret Playground

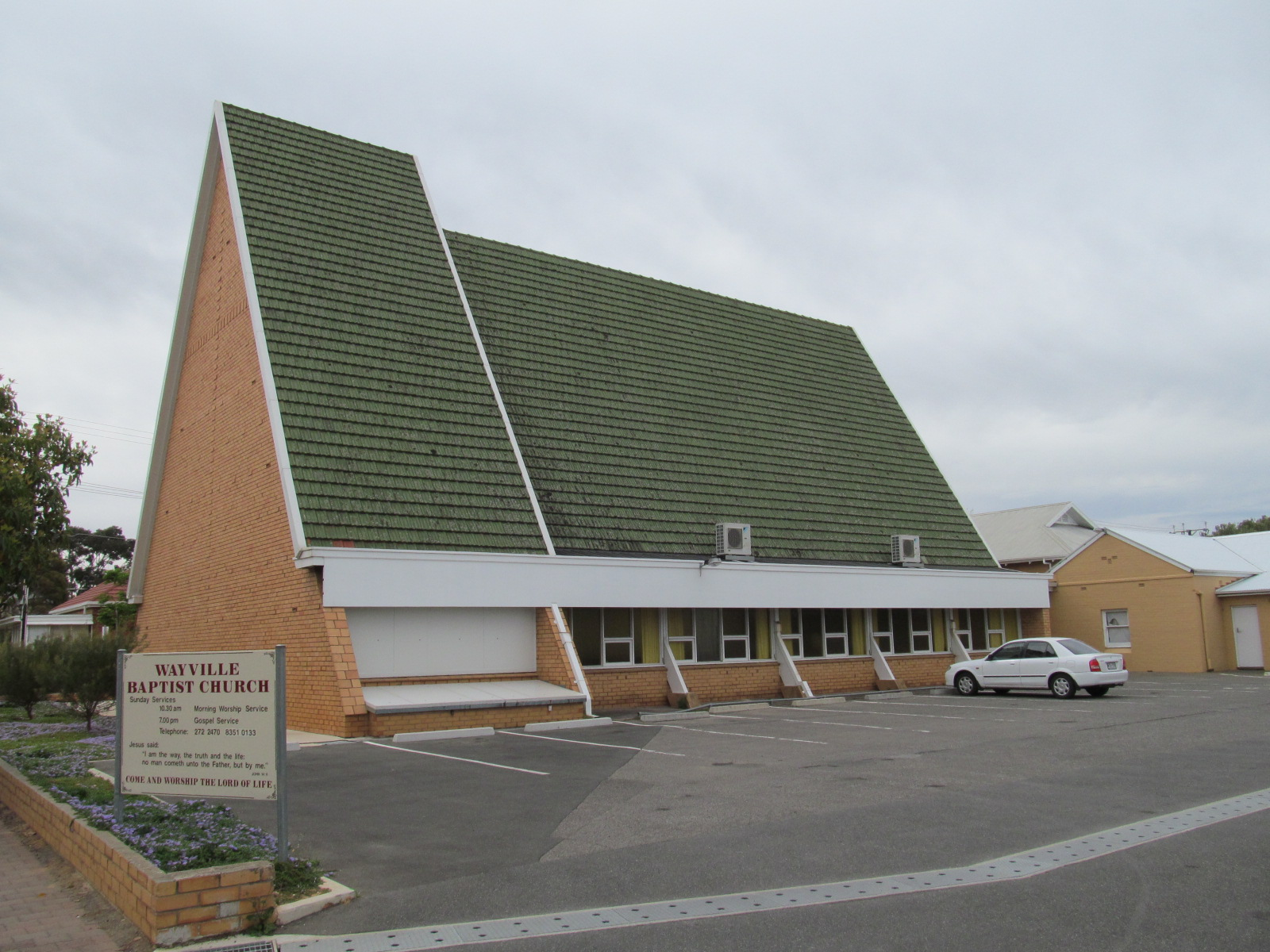
Wayville Baptist Church

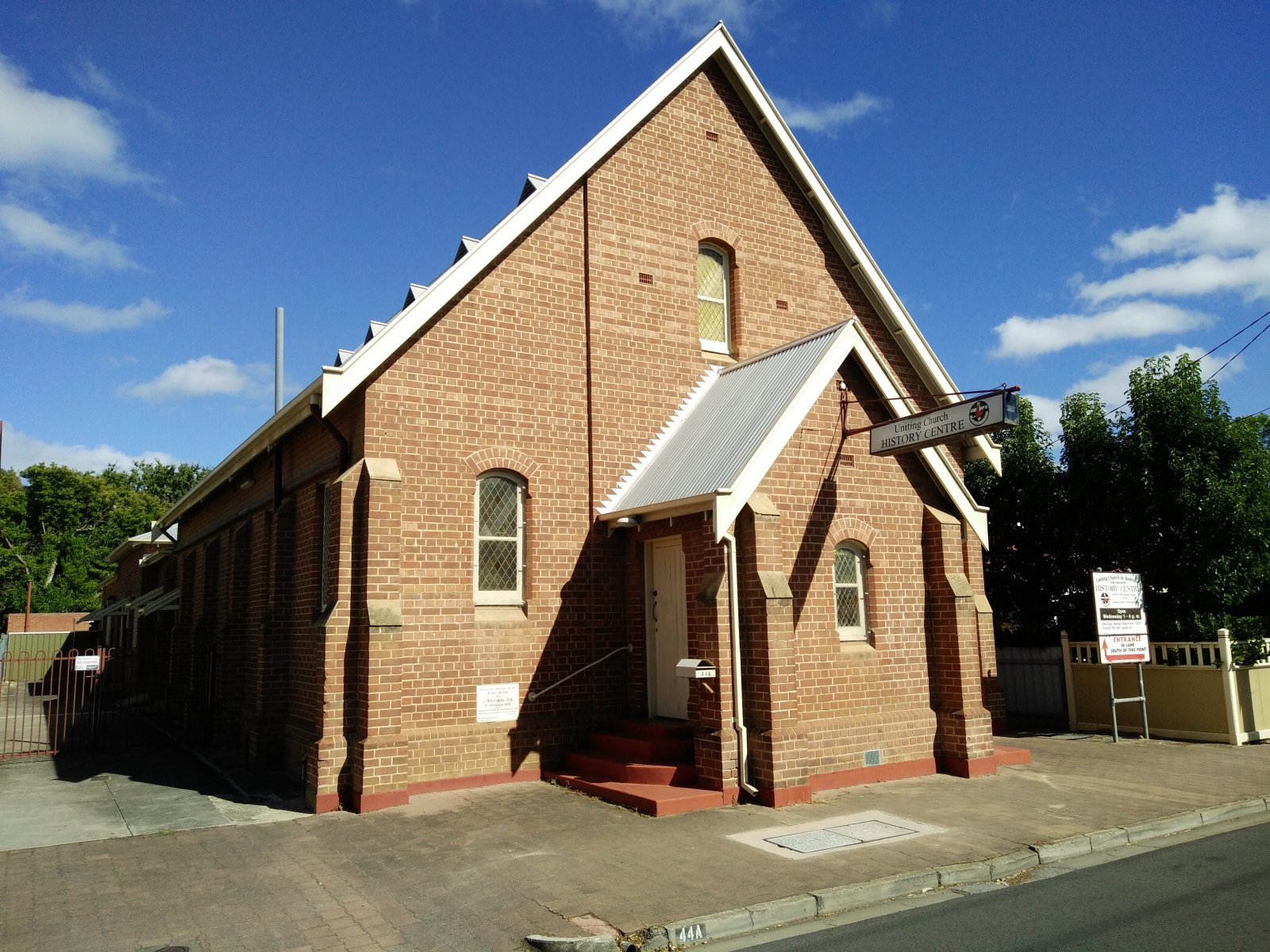
Uniting Church History Centre

Black Forest is an inner southern suburb of Adelaide, South Australia. It is located in the City of Unley, bounded by the Glenelg tram line (northwest), the Seaford railway line (southeast), South Road (west), and East Avenue (east).

== History ==
"A dense area of bush known as the Black Forest ('Kertaweeta' in Kuarna) once covered the Unley region of the Adelaide Plains. The woodland forest was a mix of grey-box, blue gum, red gum, native pines and sheoak trees, with grass trees, native grasses and orchids. These plants had deep roots that held the soil together and the plant debris that fell on the earth decomposed releasing nutrients into the soil."

In the early years of colonial settlement, the Black Forest was supposedly "frequented by bush rangers and cattle thieves".

There have been three Post Offices named Black Forest: the first opened on 1 September 1899 and was renamed Glandore in 1915, the second opened on 10 November 1947 and was renamed Clarence Park West in 1966, and the third, located on South Road between Byron and Cowper Roads, opened on 8 January 1996.

== Demographics ==
The 2006 Census by the Australian Bureau of Statistics counted 1,846 persons in Black Forest on census night. Of these, 47.2% were male and 52.8% were female.

The majority of residents (79.0%) are of Australian birth, with other common census responses being England (3.1%) and Greece (2.3%).

== Facilities and attractions ==
=== Schools ===
Black Forest Primary School opened in 1919. It is located off South Road and School Avenue, between Forest Avenue and Addison Road. The east end of the school grounds are adjacent to the "Forest Avenue Reserve".

=== Parks ===
The Forest Avenue Reserve is located on Forest Avenue near the centre of the suburb. There is another small park, the Princess Margaret Playground, at the east end of Byron Road.

=== Uniting Church History Centre ===
The Uniting Church History Centre is based in the former Church of Christ building on East Avenue.

=== Community Centre ===
The Clarence Park Community Centre is located in the Institute Building and surrounding buildings on the corner of East Avenue and Canterbury Terrace. The centre includes a childcare facility and a men's shed.

== Transport ==
=== Roads ===
Black Forest is serviced by South Road, and to a lesser degree by East Avenue.

=== Public transport ===
Black Forest is serviced by three tram stops, two train stations and buses on East Avenue and South Road. All services are run by the Adelaide Metro.

Preceding station	Adelaide Metro	Following station
Forestville towards Royal Adelaide Hospital, Adelaide Entertainment Centre or Festival Plaza	Glenelg tram line	South Road towards Moseley Square

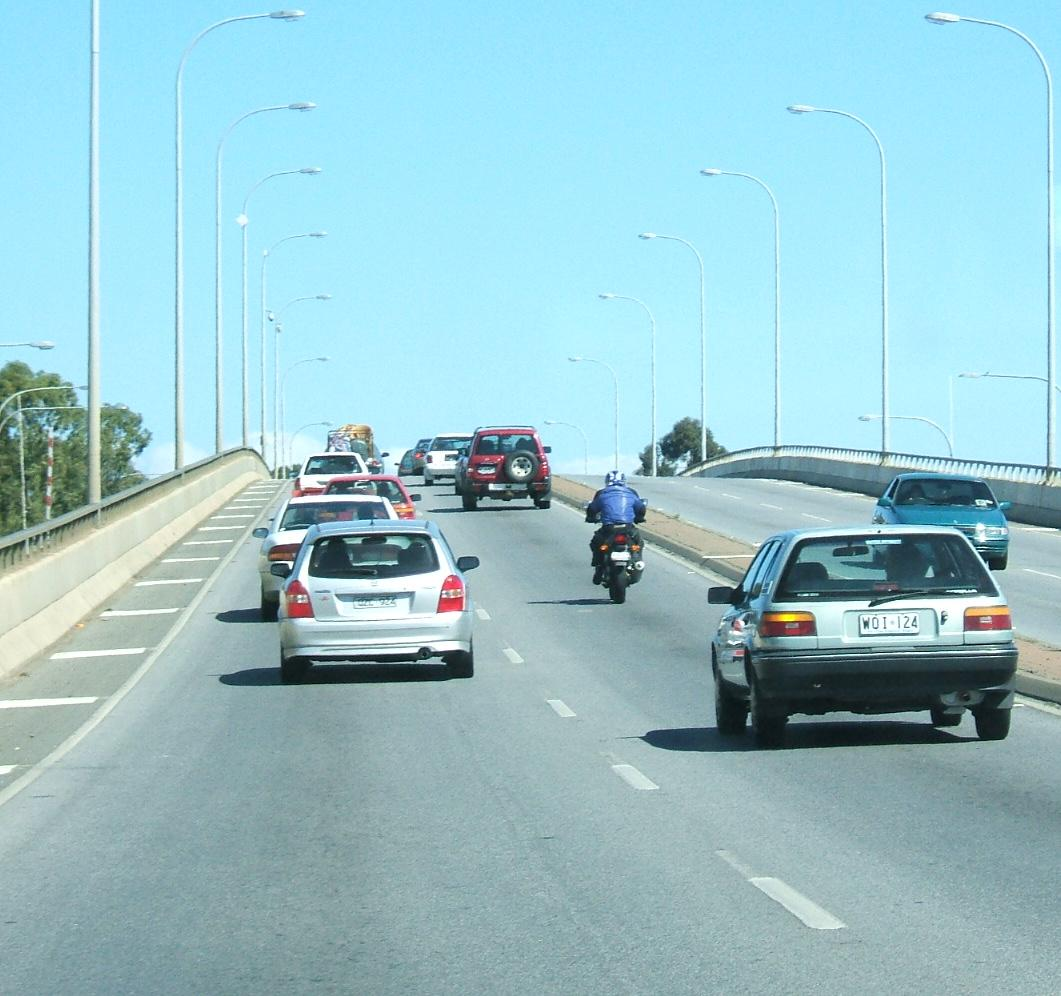
South Road overpass over Cross Road,
looking south

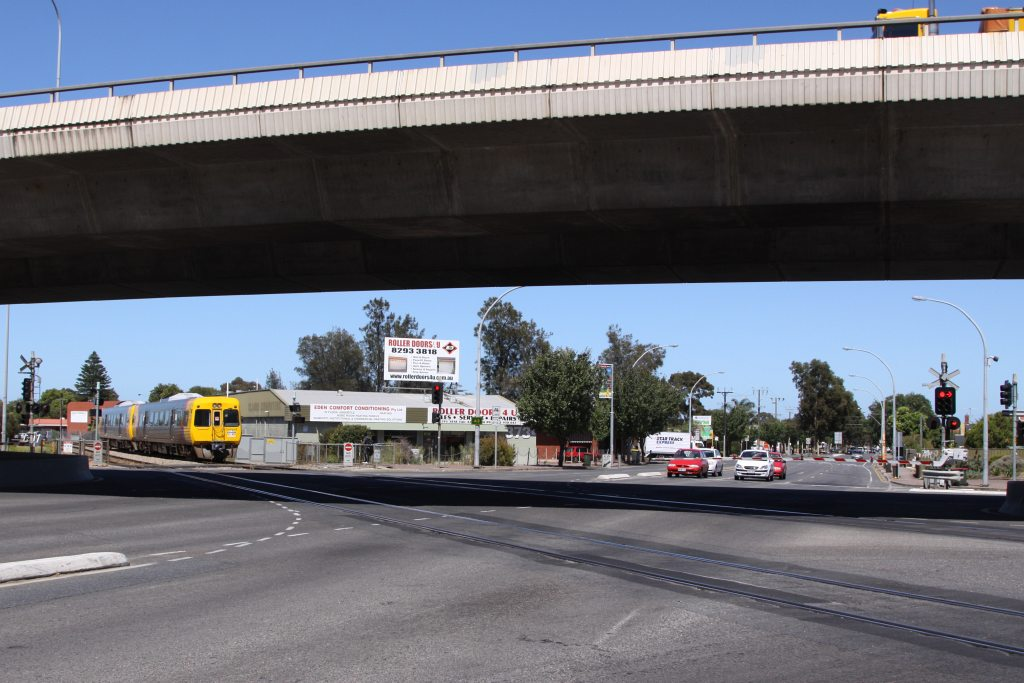
South Road overpass over Cross Road,
looking west

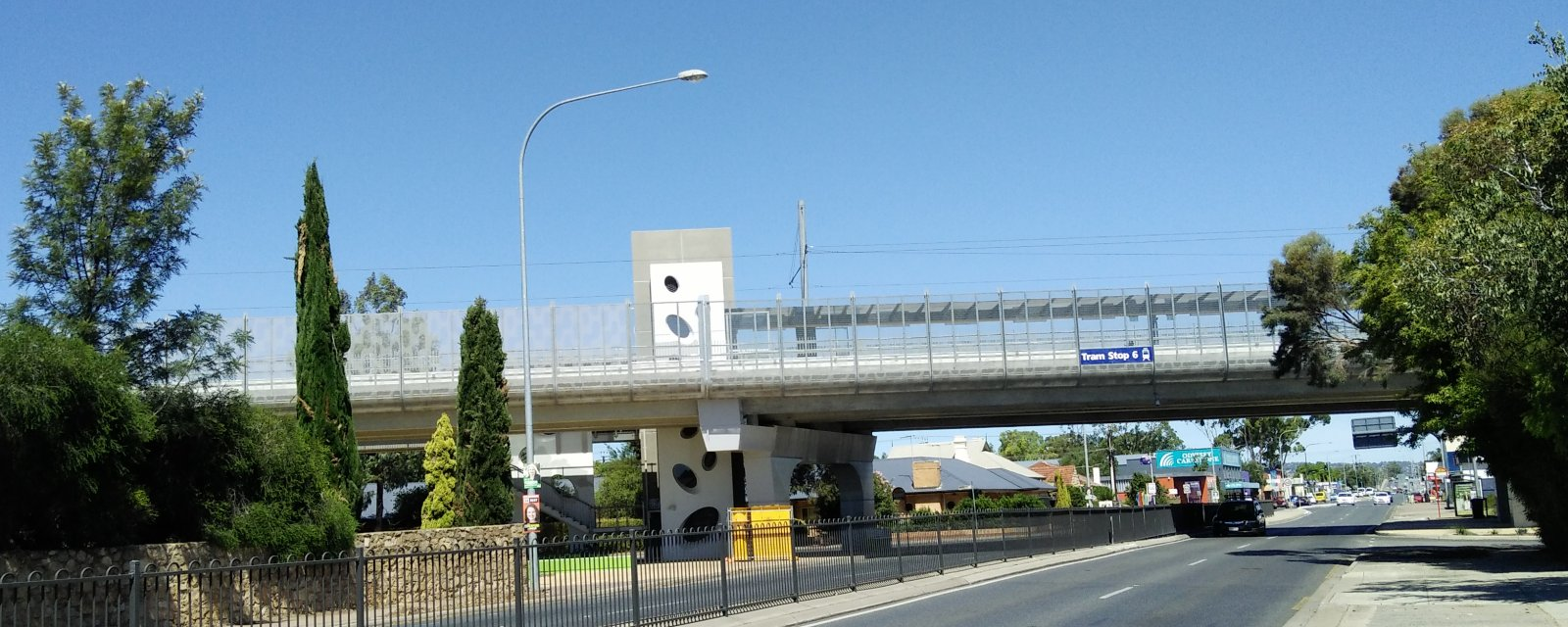
South Road Tram Overpass

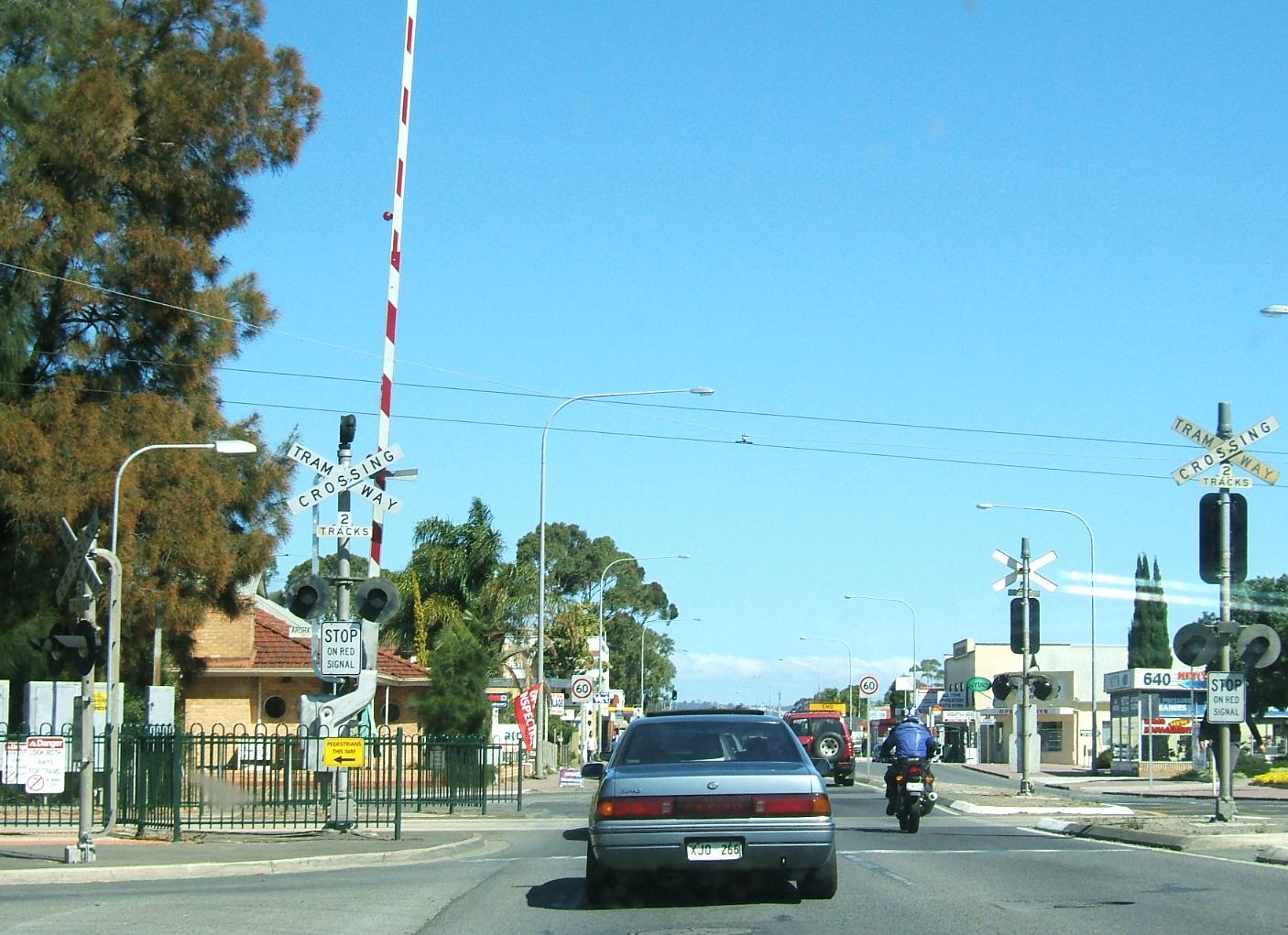
South Road Tram level crossing - prior to the overpass

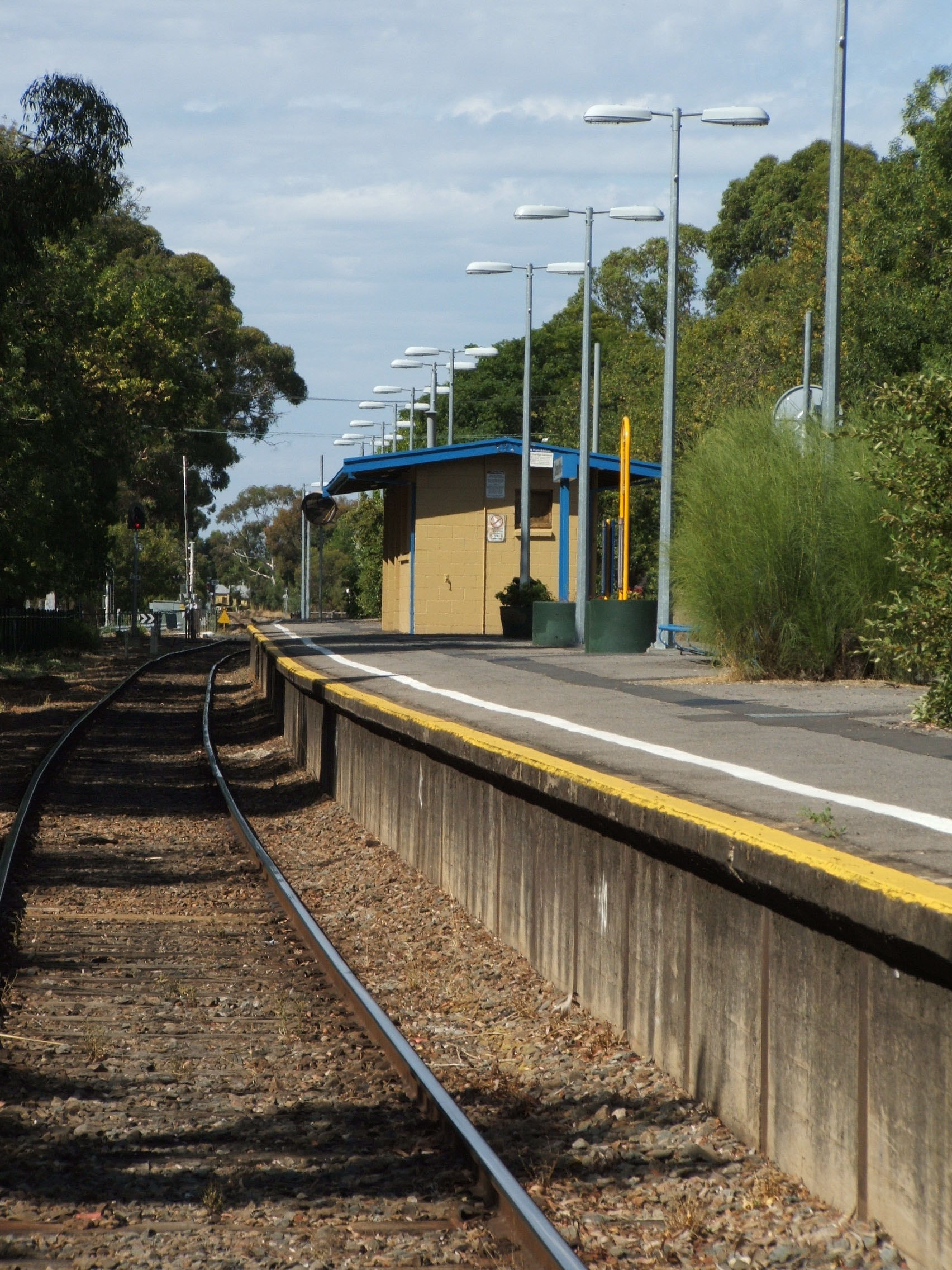
Clarence Park railway station

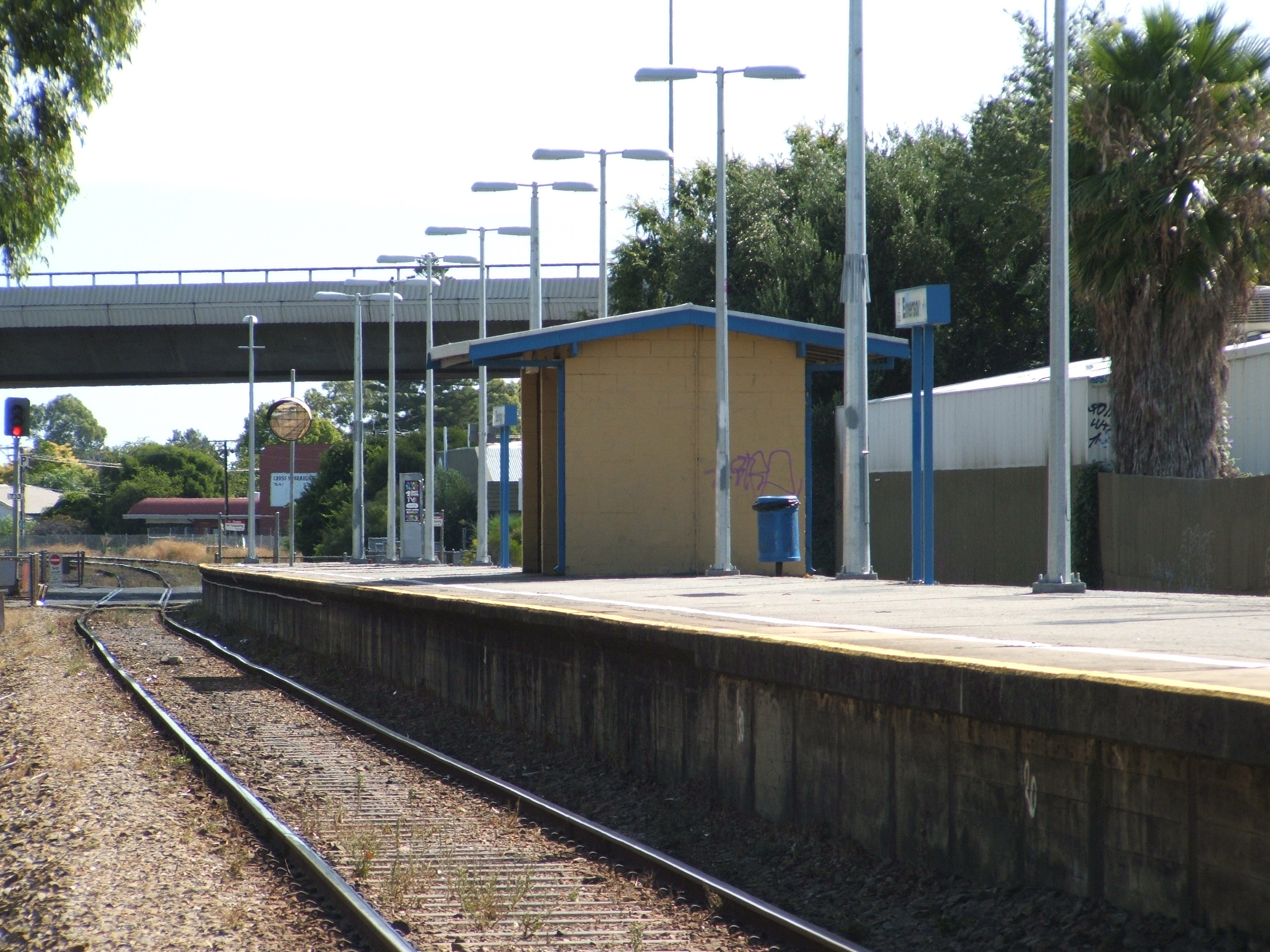
Emerson railway station

== See also ==
- List of Adelaide suburbs
