= Edwardstown, South Australia =

Edwardstown
- Suburb
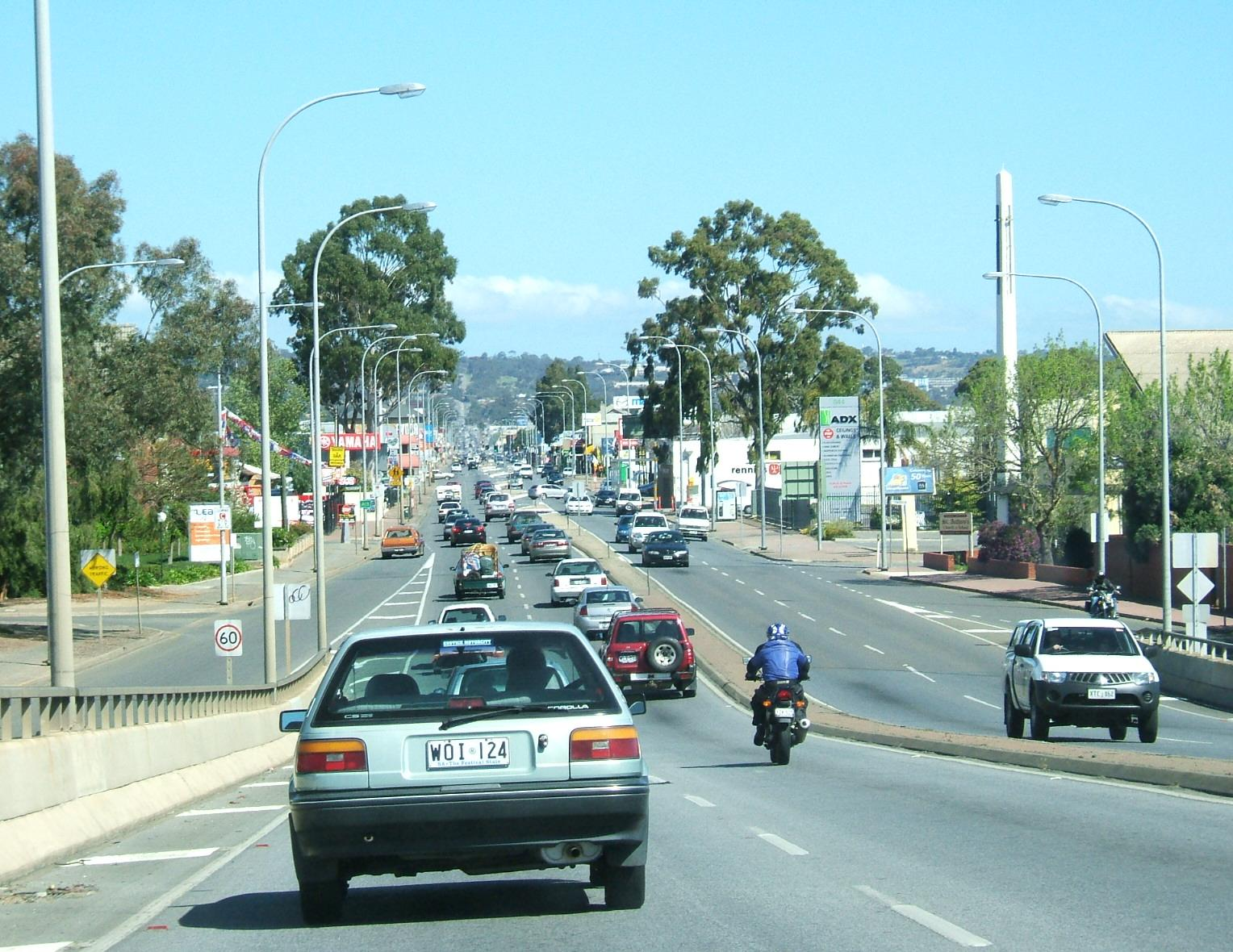
- Looking south from the Cross Road bridge; Edwardstown is on the right (west)

- Country: Australia
- State: South Australia
- City: Adelaide
- LGA: City of Marion
- Location: 6 km (3.7 mi) from Adelaide

Government
  - State electorates: Badcoe; Elder
  - Federal division: Boothby

Population
  - Total: 4,514 (SAL 2021)
- Postcode: 5039
Suburbs around Edwardstown
South Plympton	Glandore	Black Forest
Ascot Park	Edwardstown	Melrose Park
Mitchell Park	Clovelly Park	St Marys

Edwardstown is an inner southern-western suburb located 6 km southwest of Adelaide in the City of Marion.

In 1989 the suburb of Edwardstown was split, with the portion east of South Road becoming Melrose Park. This occurred as the suburb was quite large, located on either side of South Road and was in the jurisdiction of two local government councils, with the larger western side belonging to the City of Marion. The current suburb of Edwardstown includes localities previously known as Hammersmith, Woodlands Park, St Mary's West, Ackland Gardens and Mirreen.

Edwardstown is in the South Australian House of Assembly districts of Badcoe and Elder, and the Australian House of Representatives Division of Boothby.

Edwardstown is served by the Woodlands Park and Edwardstown railway stations. Edwardstown is home to the Castle Plaza Shopping Centre. The Catholic Church in the suburb is dedicated to St Anthony.

== See also ==
- List of Adelaide suburbs
- Electoral district of Edwardstown
