= Marleston, South Australia =

Marleston
- Suburb
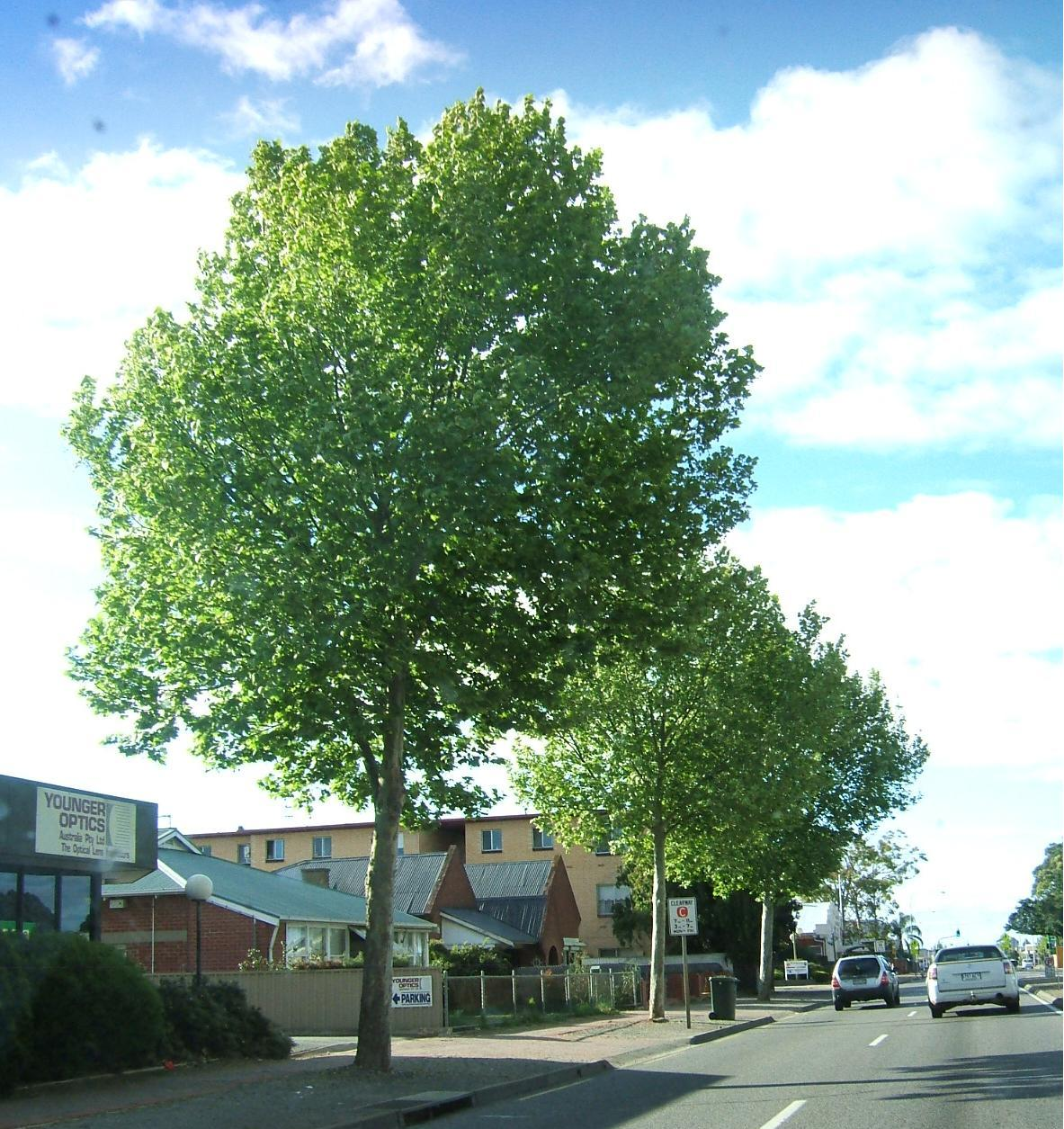
- Looking north along South Road, Marleston is to the west.

- Country: Australia
- State: South Australia
- City: Adelaide
- LGA: City of West Torrens

Government
  - State electorate: Badcoe
  - Federal division: Adelaide

Population
  - Total: 1,950 (SAL 2021)
- Postcode: 5033
Suburbs around Marleston
West Richmond	Richmond	Mile End South
Netley	Marleston	Keswick
Netley	North Plympton, Kurralta Park	Ashford

Marleston is a suburb of Adelaide, South Australia, in the City of West Torrens. Marleston was home to 1,950 people at the 2021 census.

The earliest European settler in this area was Donald McLean, who selected Section 50, Hundred of Adelaide, of 80 acres (32 ha) in 1837, (the area was originally part of Hilton) and with his family ploughed and sowed 20 acres of seed wheat, and in 1838 reaped the first harvest of wheat in South Australia. The McLean property was divided into nine allotments of 8.75 acres in the 1860s. John Marles bought allotment 7 in 1874 and subdivided it in 1879. Following World War I, there was a housing boom driven by returned servicemen. Town Planner Charles Reade persuaded several land owners to work together and developed Galway Gardens on garden suburb principles.

== Demographics ==
The 2021 Census by the Australian Bureau of Statistics counted 1,950 persons in Marleston on census night. Of these, 49.0% were male and 50.8% were female.

The majority of residents (58.5%) are of Australian birth, with other common census responses being India (7.6%), China (4.4%), Nepal (2.8%), England (2.6%), and Greece (2.3%). Additionally, people of Aboriginal and/or Torres Strait Islander descent made up 1.3% of the suburb.

In terms of religious affiliation, 37.1% attributed themselves to being irreligious, 17.0% of residents attributed themselves to being Catholic, 7.1% attributed themselves to Hinduism, and 6.9% attributed themselves to being Eastern Orthodox.
