= Richmond, South Australia =

Richmond
- Suburb
- Country: Australia
- State: South Australia
- City: Adelaide
- LGA: City of West Torrens
- Location: 3 km (1.9 mi) west of Adelaide

Government
  - State electorate: Ashford
  - Federal division: Adelaide

Population
  - Total: 3,474 (SAL 2021)
- Postcode: 5033
Suburbs around Richmond
Brooklyn Park	Cowandilla	Hilton
West Richmond	Richmond	Mile End South
Netley	Marleston	Keswick

Richmond is an inner suburb of Adelaide, South Australia. It is located on Kaurna land in the City of West Torrens.

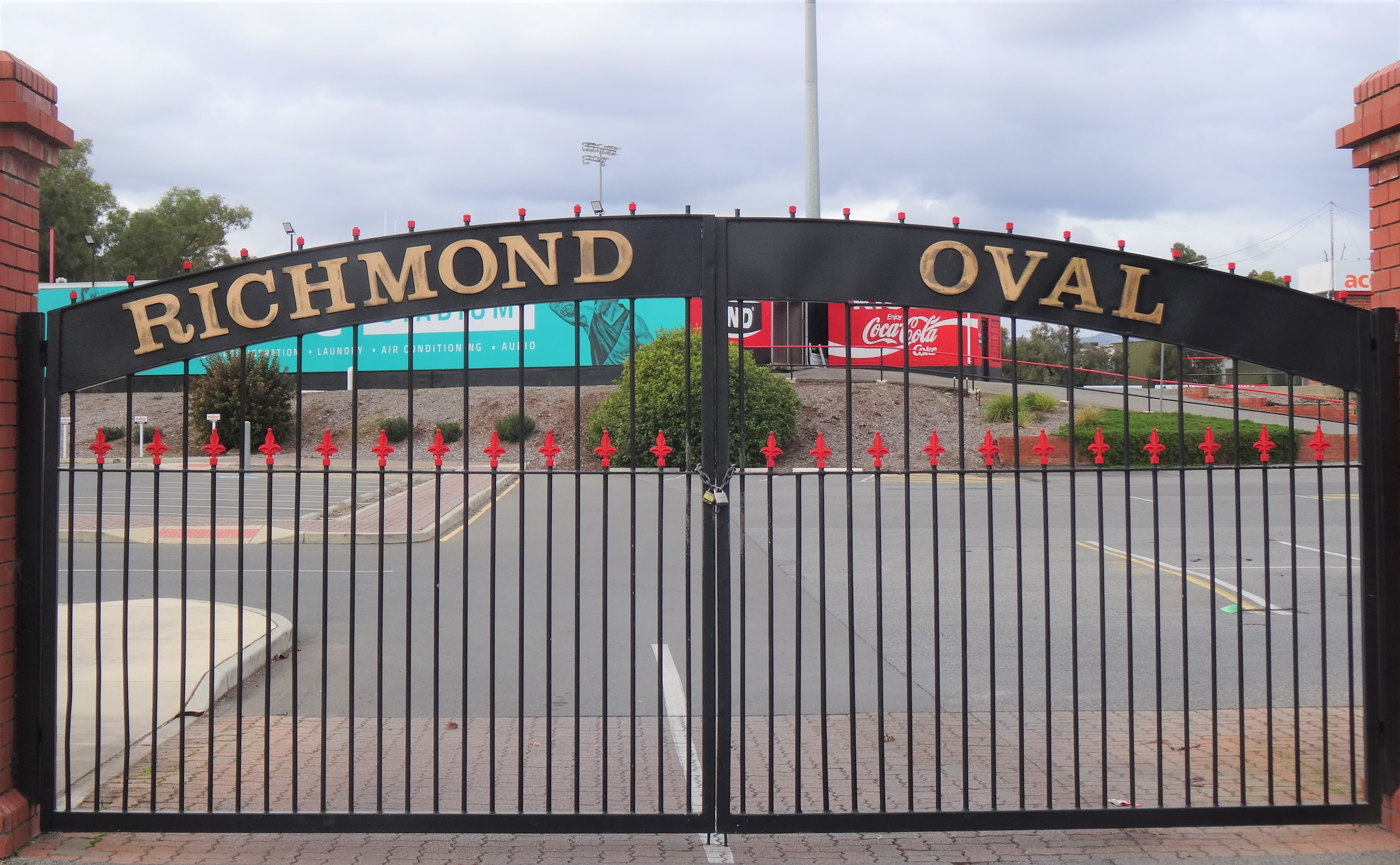
Gates to the Richmond Oval

== History ==
Settlement of the area dates from the late 1830s with land used mainly for farming. Residential and industrial growth took place from the late 19th century into the early 20th century. Expansion continued in the interwar period. The most significant development occurred during the post-war years. The population increased marginally between 2001 and 2006, a result of new dwellings being added to the area.

It was named after the first farm that was established in the area in 1839, owned by Charles Gooch. A subdivision on 1842 of the surrounding area was called "The Village of Richmond".

"Richmond Park", the racehorse stud owned by James Henry Aldridge at the end of Richmond Road is now part of Adelaide Airport.

== Attractions ==
=== Shopping and dining ===
Although much of the suburb is residential, there are small commercial and industrial areas along Richmond Road and South Road.

=== Parks ===
The most notable greenspace in Richmond is Richmond Oval, on Milner Road. Currently named City Mazda Stadium, the 16,000 capacity venue has been the home base of the West Adelaide Football Club since 1958.

The Westside Bikeway is a cycling and walking track adjacent to Deacon Avenue, on the alignment of the former Holdfast Bay railway line which closed in 1929.

Richmond was also the home of the now closed Apollo Stadium, Adelaide's major indoor entertainment and sports venue from its opening in 1969 until the opening of the Adelaide Entertainment Centre in 1991 and the Clipsal Powerhouse (now Adelaide Arena) in 1992. Located on Kingston Avenue, the 3,000 seat venue was named for the Apollo Moon landing in 1969. After 1992 the venue was turned into a church before finally closing in 1997.

== Transport ==
=== Roads ===
The suburb is serviced by the following main roads:

- South Road, running north–south from the far north of Adelaide to the far south.
- Marion Road, running north–south between Torrensville and Sturt
- Sir Donald Bradman Drive, running east–west between the City of Adelaide and West Beach.

=== Public transport ===
Richmond is serviced by public transport run by the Adelaide Metro.

==== Trains ====
There is no train stop in Richmond itself. However, the Belair, Seaford and Tonsley railway lines all pass nearby to the east. The closest stations are Mile End and Adelaide Showground.

==== Trams ====
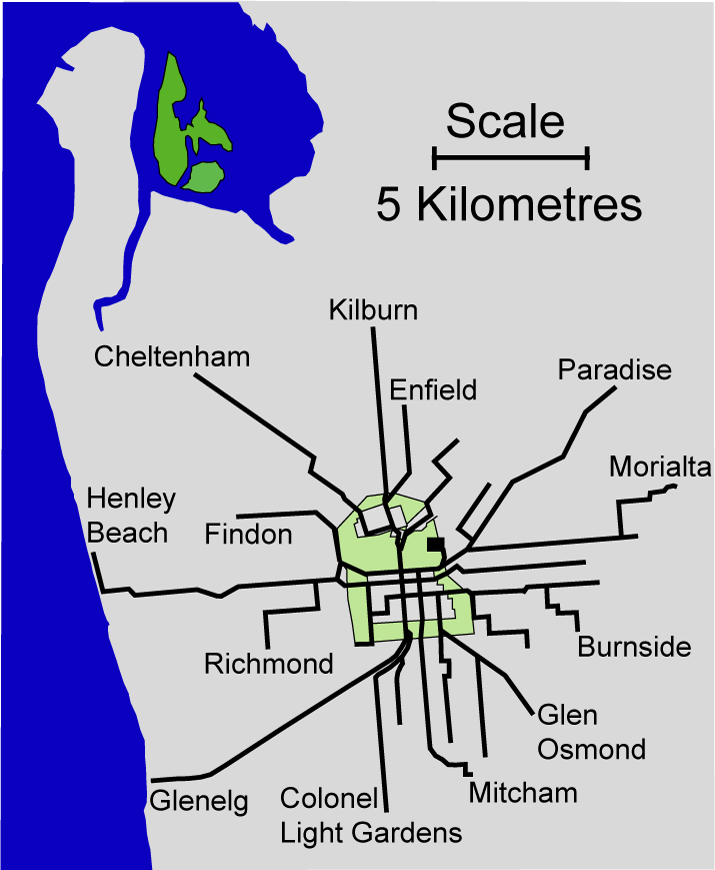
Trams served Richmond.

There were trams in the early days but these were removed in the 1950s and 60s.

==== Buses ====
Among others, the suburb is serviced by the following bus routes:

- 100, 101

Timetable
Routemap

- 135

Timetable
Route map

- 167, 168

Timetable
Route map

- 548

Timetable
Route map

- J7

Timetable
Route map

== See also ==
- List of Adelaide suburbs
- List of public transport routes in Adelaide
