= Sir Donald Bradman Drive =

Road in Adelaide, South Australia

Sir Donald Bradman Drive Burbridge Road South Australia
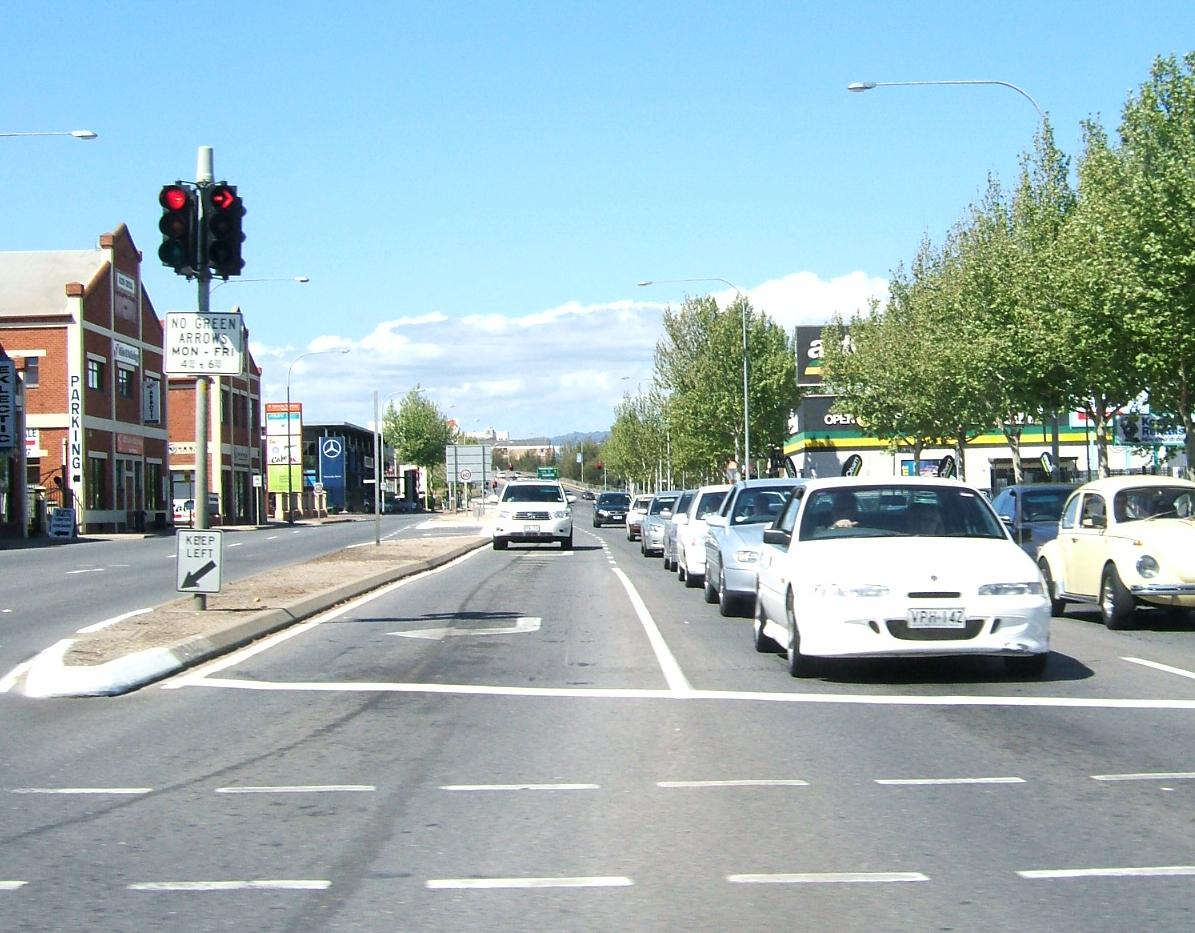
- Looking east at the South Road intersection towards the city.
- Coordinates: 34.938051°S 138.500020°E (West end); 34.929260°S 138.587855°E (East end)

General information
- Type: Road
- Location: Adelaide
- Length: 8.1 km (5.0 mi)
- Route number(s): A6 (1998–present) (Lockleys–Mile End)
- Former route number: (1998–2017) (Mile End–Adelaide)

Major junctions
- West end: Seaview Road; West Beach, Adelaide
- Tapleys Hill Road; Marion Road; South Road; James Congdon Drive; West Terrace
- East end: Grote Street; Adelaide

Location(s)
- Region: Western Adelaide, Eastern Adelaide
- Major suburbs: Adelaide Airport, Cowandilla, Hilton, Mile End South

Sir Donald Bradman Drive (and its western section as Burbridge Road) is a major arterial road that travels east–west through the western suburbs of Adelaide, South Australia. It is the main route from the Adelaide city centre to the Adelaide Airport.

== Route ==
Commencing at the intersection with Seaview Road, Burbridge Road heads directly east through West Beach, before intersecting with Tapleys Hill Road, changing name to Sir Donald Bradman Drive and continuing east along the northern border of Adelaide Airport. Crossing Marion Road, it continues east through Cowandilla and Hilton, crosses South Road, and continues across the Adelaide Parklands Terminal railyards, through the Adelaide Park Lands, to terminate with Grote Street at the intersection with West Terrace in Adelaide's city centre.

== History ==
Formerly known as Burbridge Road, the section between the city centre and Tapleys Hill Road was renamed as Sir Donald Bradman Drive on 1 January 2001 in honour of Australian cricketer Sir Donald Bradman. The remaining section of Burbridge Road, west of Tapleys Hill Road to the coast, retains its original name.

== Major intersections ==
LGA	Location	km	mi	Destinations	Notes
Charles Sturt	West Beach	0.0	0.0	Seaview Road – Henley Beach, Tennyson	Western terminus of Burbridge Road and route A6
West Torrens	West Beach–Lockleys–Adelaide Airport tripoint	1.6	0.99	Tapleys Hill Road (A15) – Alberton, Glenelg, Brighton, Port Noarlunga	Name change: Burbridge Road (west), Sir Donald Bradman Drive (east)
West Torrens	Lockleys–Adelaide Airport boundary	3.8	2.4	Airport Road – Adelaide Airport, Brooklyn Park	
West Torrens	Brooklyn Park–Cowandilla boundary	4.8	3.0	Marion Road (A14) – Plympton, Park Holme, Darlington	
West Torrens	Hilton–Mile End–Mile End South tripoint	6.5	4.0	South Road (A2) – Hindmarsh, Edwardstown, St Marys	
West Torrens	Mile End–Mile End South boundary	6.9	4.3	James Congden Drive (R1) – Ovingham, Wayville	Eastern terminus of route A6
West Torrens–Adelaide boundary	Mile End–Keswick Terminal–Adelaide tripoint	7.5	4.7	Seaford, Flinders, Belair, Adelaide–Port Augusta SG and Adelaide–Wolseley SG railway lines	
Adelaide	Adelaide	8.1	5.0	West Terrace – Adelaide CBD	
Adelaide	Adelaide	8.1	5.0	Grote Street – Adelaide CBD	Eastern terminus of Sir Donald Bradman Drive
Route transition
