= Ashford Hospital, Adelaide =

Coordinates: 34°56′55.32″S 138°34′38.15″E

Ashford Hospital
- Adelaide Community Healthcare Alliance

Geography
- Location: 55-59 Anzac Highway, Ashford, South Australia, Australia

Organisation
- Type: Community Hospital

Services
- Emergency department: Yes
- Beds: 239

Helipads
- Helipad: No

History
- Founded: 1950

Links
- Website: www.ashfordhospital.org.au
- Lists: Hospitals in Australia

Ashford Hospital is a 239-bed private, not-for-profit hospital on the Anzac Highway in the suburb of Ashford, five kilometers from the CBD.

It provides acute (including emergency) and maternity care.

== History ==
Originally Ashford Community Hospital, Ashford Hospital opened in 1950 as a joint venture between the Unley, Mitcham, West Torrens and Marion councils and a group of local doctors.

It was the second hospital opened on the same site with Ashford Private Hospital first opening in 1935, which was run by two nursing sisters who sold the hospital to Ashford Community Hospital in 1950.

In 1995, Ashford was the first private hospital in South Australia to open an emergency department which now attends to approximately 20,000 patients each year.
