= Anzac Highway =

Highway in Adelaide

Anzac Highway South Australia
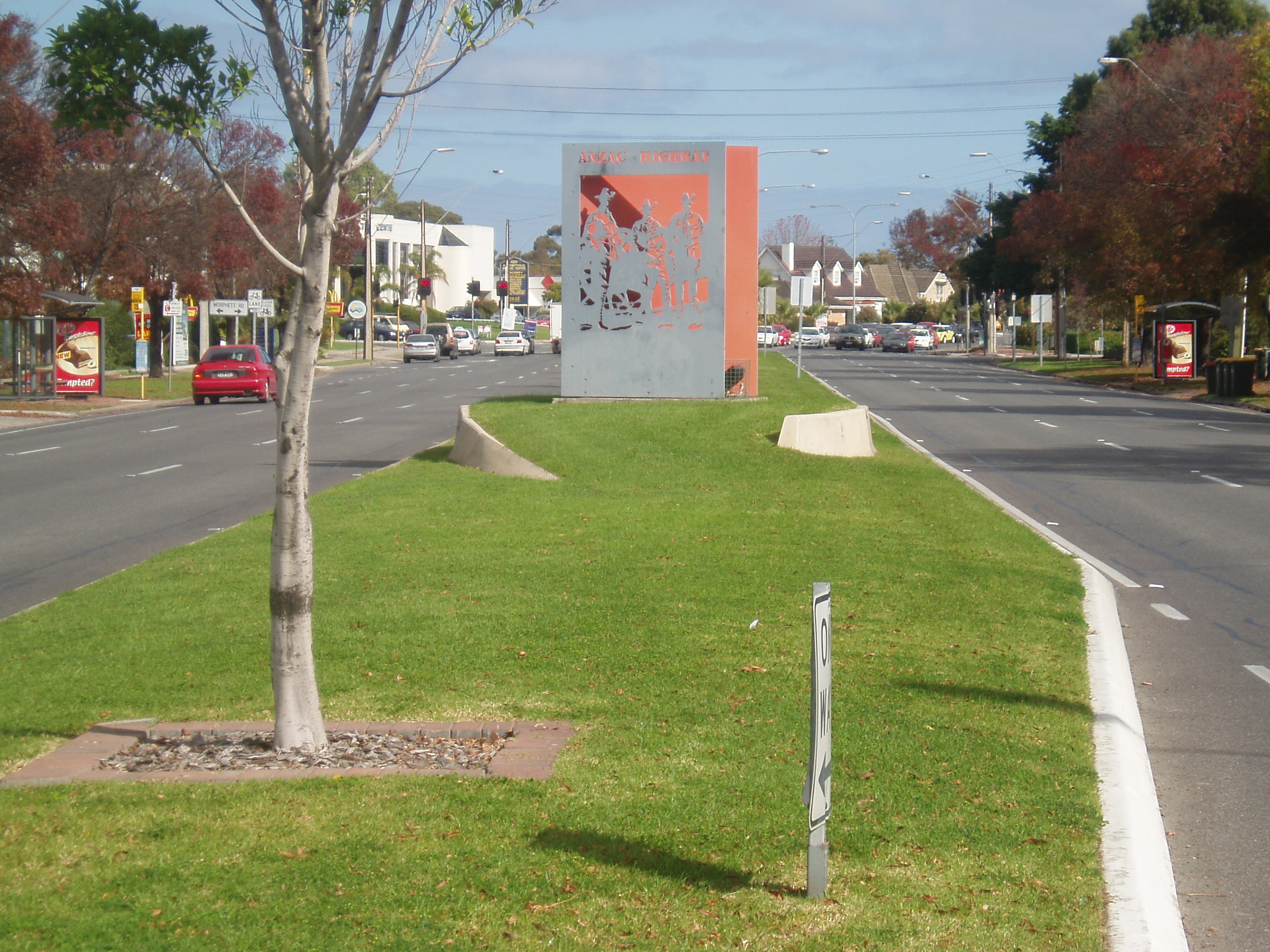
- Anzac Highway facing south-west towards the Morphett Road intersection
- Coordinates: 34.915676°S 138.622745°E (Northeast end); 34.936301°S 138.588401°E (Southwest end)

General information
- Type: Highway
- Location: Adelaide
- Length: 8.7 km (5.4 mi)
- Route number(s): A5 (1998–present) (Keswick–Glenelg)
- Former route number: (1998–2017) (Adelaide–Keswick)

Major junctions
- Northeast end: West Terrace; Adelaide
- Goodwood Road; Greenhill Road; South Road; Cross Road; Marion Road; Tapleys Hill Road
- Southwest end: Colley Terrace; Glenelg, Adelaide

Location(s)
- Region: Eastern Adelaide, Western Adelaide, Southern Adelaide
- Major suburbs: Plympton, Camden Park

Highway system
- Highways in Australia; National Highway • Freeways in Australia; Highways in South Australia

Anzac Highway is an 8.7-kilometre-long (5.4 mi) main arterial road heading southwest from the city of Adelaide, the capital of South Australia, to the beachside suburb of Glenelg.

Originally named the Bay Road, it mostly follows the track made by the pioneer James Chambers from Holdfast Bay, the first governor's landing site, to Adelaide. It gained its current name in 1923, to honour the contribution of the ANZACs in World War I.

== Route ==
Beginning at the intersection with South Terrace, West Terrace and Goodwood Road on the Adelaide city centre's south-western corner, Anzac Highway heads southwest through the Adelaide Park Lands, through Plympton, before turning west through Camden Park and terminates at the bayside suburb of Glenelg.

The highway is serviced by a 15-minute "Go Zone", (Note: Adelaide Metro definition: "A Go Zone is an area that offers public transport services every 15 minutes between 7.30am and 6.30pm Monday to Friday, and every 30 minutes at night, Saturday, Sunday and public holidays until approximately 10pm. Stops within Go Zones are indicated by red hoop signs.") serviced by the 262, 263 and 265 buses.

== History ==
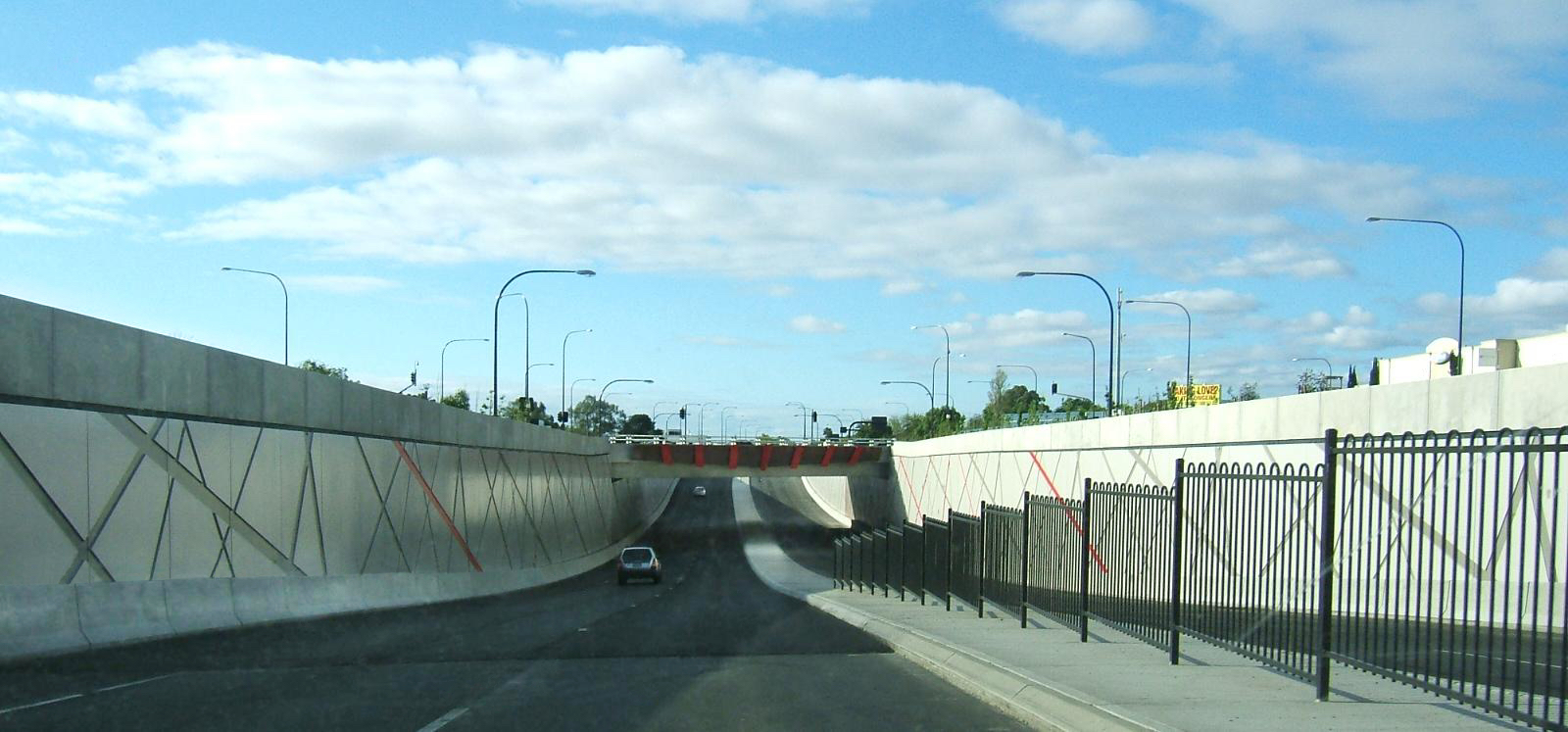
The South Road Underpass beneath Anzac Highway

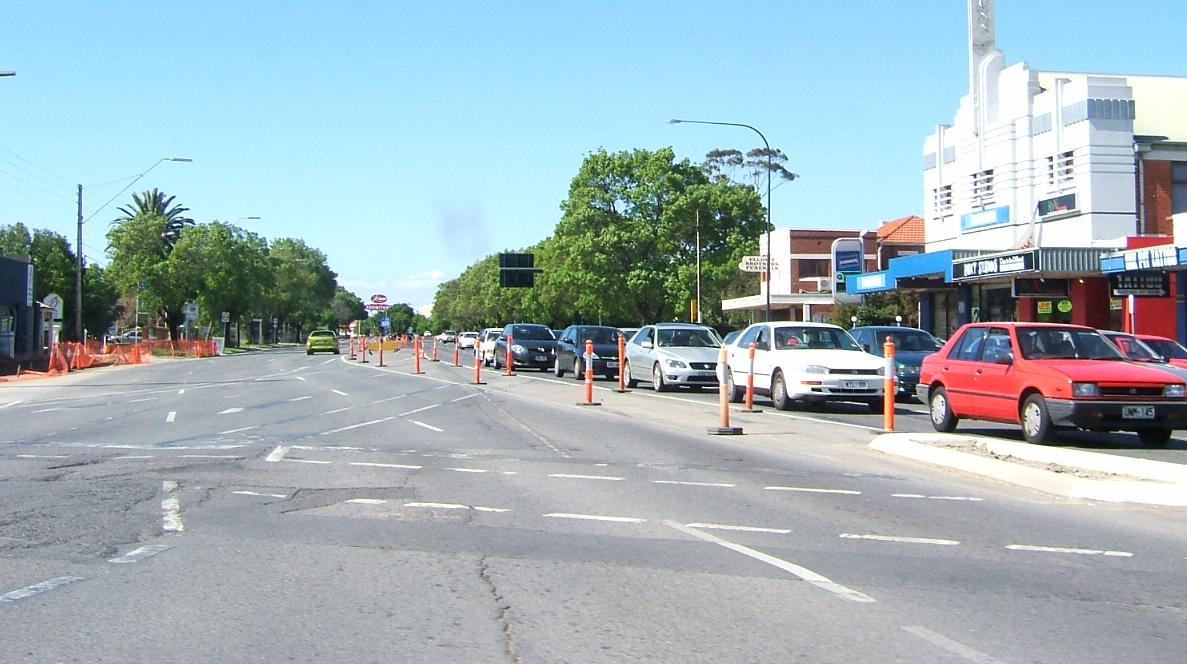
Looking towards the city at the South Road intersection, 2008. This intersection has since been replaced with an underpass.

The road from the city to Holdfast Bay was originally named the Bay Road. After the state government was lobbied in 1917 by the ANZAC Memorial League to rename it in honour of the ANZAC troops who fought in World War I, it was renamed Anzac Highway in 1923, at the same time doing some roadworks. In 1937, the government, in collaboration with the West Torrens Council, Unley Council and Glenelg Council Council agreed on a plan for the future of the road, which was ratified by Parliament by the passing of the Anzac Highway Memorial Act 1937. The plan included developing a dual carriageway which included trees on the central reservation and along the verges, to be maintained by the respective councils. Claret ash trees were chosen.

On 18 September 1918, a tram line opened from Sturt Street in the city, via West Terrace and then down the Bay Road to Keswick. It was used to transport soldiers returned from World War I to the military hospital there. Known as the West City Line, it ran down West Terrace and Goodwood Road, and turned west into Park Terrace, now Greenhill Road, before turning in to Bay Road. It terminated at the entry to the Keswick Barracks. After redevelopment of Anzac Highway in the 1930s, the tram line was truncated at the new Keswick Road Bridge in March 1939, at a stop known as Wayville West. In December 1957, this line was closed.

The South Road intersection with Anzac Highway had major construction works in 2007-2009, as part of a South Australian Government initiative to transform South Road into a non-stop north–south route. Both routes became grade-separated, with South Road travelling through an underpass, with bi-directional controlled exits onto Anzac Highway. The underpass model is a diamond interchange. In October 2007, construction began. In March 2009, the underpass was opened, and named the Gallipoli Underpass, in keeping with the Anzac theme. Each of the four corners of the intersection has a display to commemorate those who fought in the war.

== Major intersections ==
LGA	Location	km	mi	Destinations	Notes
Adelaide	Adelaide	0.0	0.0	West Terrace (north) – Adelaide CBD; South Terrace (east) – Adelaide CBD; Goodwood Road (south) – Goodwood, Pasadena	Northeastern terminus of highway; no access from Anzac Highway to Goodwood Road
Adelaide–West Torrens–Unley tripoint	Adelaide–Keswick Terminal–Keswick–Wayville quadripoint	0.8	0.50	Richmond Road (R1 west) – Mile End South, Thebarton; Greenhill Road (R1 east) – Burnside, Uraidla, Balhannah	Northeastern terminus of route A5
Adelaide–West Torrens–Unley tripoint	Adelaide–Keswick Terminal–Keswick–Wayville quadripoint	0.8	0.50	Seaford, Flinders, Belair and Adelaide–Wolseley SG railway lines	
West Torrens–Unley boundary	Kurralta Park–Ashford–Everard Park–Wayville quadripoint	2.4	1.5	South Road (A2) – Hindmarsh, Edwardstown, Darlington	Diamond interchange (South Road free-flowing)
West Torrens	Plympton	4.4	2.7	Marion Road (A14) – Brooklyn Park, Park Holme, Darlington	
West Torrens	Camden Park	5.1	3.2	Cross Road (A3 east) – Unley Park, Glen Osmond; Stonehouse Avenue (west) – Camden Park	
Marion	Glengowrie	6.4	4.0	Morphett Road – Novar Gardens, Oaklands Park, Seacombe Gardens	
Holdfast Bay	Glenelg	8.0	5.0	Tapleys Hill Road (A15 north) – Port Adelaide, Fulham; Brighton Road (A15 south) – Brighton, Hallett Cove, Port Noarlunga	Southwestern terminus of route A5
Holdfast Bay	Glenelg	8.7	5.4	Chapell Drive (west) – Glenelg; Colley Terrace (south) – Glenelg	Roundabout; southwestern terminus of highway
1.000 mi = 1.609 km; 1.000 km = 0.621 mi: Incomplete access; Route transition

== In popular culture ==
Anzac Highway is mentioned in the song "One More Boring Night in Adelaide" by Redgum, on their 1978 album If You Don't Fight You Lose and also in The Last Frontier.

== See also ==
- Highways in Australia
- List of highways in South Australia
