= Ashford, South Australia =

Ashford
- Suburb
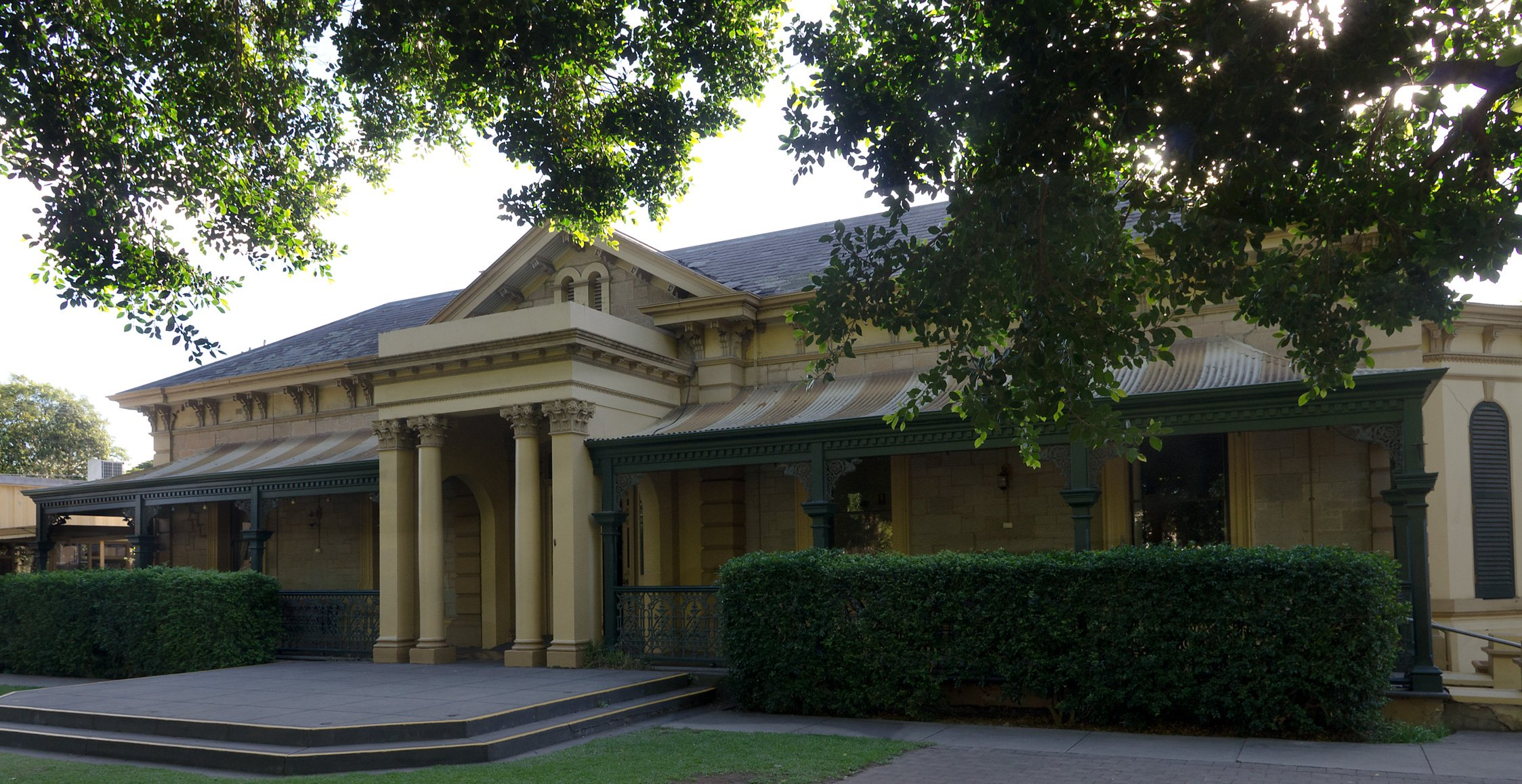
- Ashford House, now part of the Ashford Special School

- Country: Australia
- State: South Australia
- City: Adelaide
- LGA: City of West Torrens

Government
  - State electorate: Badcoe
  - Federal division: Adelaide

Population
  - Total: 1,157 (SAL 2021)
- Postcode: 5035
Suburbs around Ashford
Marleston	Keswick	Keswick
Kurralta Park	Ashford	Keswick, Forestville
Kurralta Park, Glandore	Everard Park, Forestville	Forestville

Ashford is an inner southwestern suburb of Adelaide, in the City of West Torrens. It is triangular in shape and bordered by South Road (west), Anzac Highway (southeast) and Everard Avenue (north). Two of the main features of the suburb are Ashford Hospital and Ashford Special School.

Brownhill Creek flows through Ashford in a cement channel behind the school.

The name commemorates the property and residence (now part of Ashford Special School) of Dr. Charles George Everard, who settled in the area in 1838, and named it for Ashford, Kent.

== Notable people ==
Notable people from Ashford:

- Victoria Balomenos (born 1988), soccer player
- Nick Benton (born 1991), cricketer
- Simon Birmingham (born 1974), politician
- Craig Bradley (born 1963), Australian rules footballer and cricketer
- Emma Checker (born 1996), soccer player
- Leanne Choo (born 1991), badminton
- Louis D'Arrigo (born 2001), soccer player
- Harry Matthias (born 1998), cricketer
- Harry Nielsen (born 1995), cricketer
- Morgan Yaeger (born 1998), basketballer
- Kyle Chalmers (born 1998), Olympic swimmer and gold medalist
- Jesse Moore (born 2003), Olympic Mens Artistic Gymnast
