= Netley, South Australia =

Netley
- Suburb
- Coordinates: 34°56′43″S 138°33′2″E
- Country: Australia
- State: South Australia
- City: Adelaide
- LGA: City of West Torrens

Government
  - State electorate: Badcoe
  - Federal division: Hindmarsh

Population
  - Total: 1,910 (SAL 2021)
- Postcode: 5037
Suburbs around Netley
Adelaide Airport	West Richmond	Richmond
Adelaide Airport	Netley	Marleston
North Plympton	North Plympton	North Plympton

Netley is a suburb of Adelaide, South Australia, in the City of West Torrens. It is located about halfway from the Adelaide city centre to the coast, on the southeastern boundary of Adelaide Airport. The northern part, south of Richmond Road and west of Marion Road is predominantly industrial. South of Watson Avenue, the suburb is mainly residential in character, including both a kindergarten and retirement village. The Netley Primary School closed and merged with others to form William Light School for the 1998 school year.
