= West Richmond, South Australia =

West Richmond
- Suburb
- Country: Australia
- State: South Australia
- City: Adelaide
- LGA: City of West Torrens
- Location: 5 km (3.1 mi) W of Adelaide

Government
  - State electorate: Ashford
  - Federal division: Hindmarsh

Population
  - Total: 1,087 (SAL 2021)
- Postcode: 5033
Suburbs around West Richmond
Brooklyn Park	Cowandilla	Hilton
Adelaide Airport	West Richmond	Richmond
Adelaide Airport	Netley	Kurralta Park

West Richmond is a small residential suburb of Adelaide, in the City of West Torrens east of the Adelaide Airport.

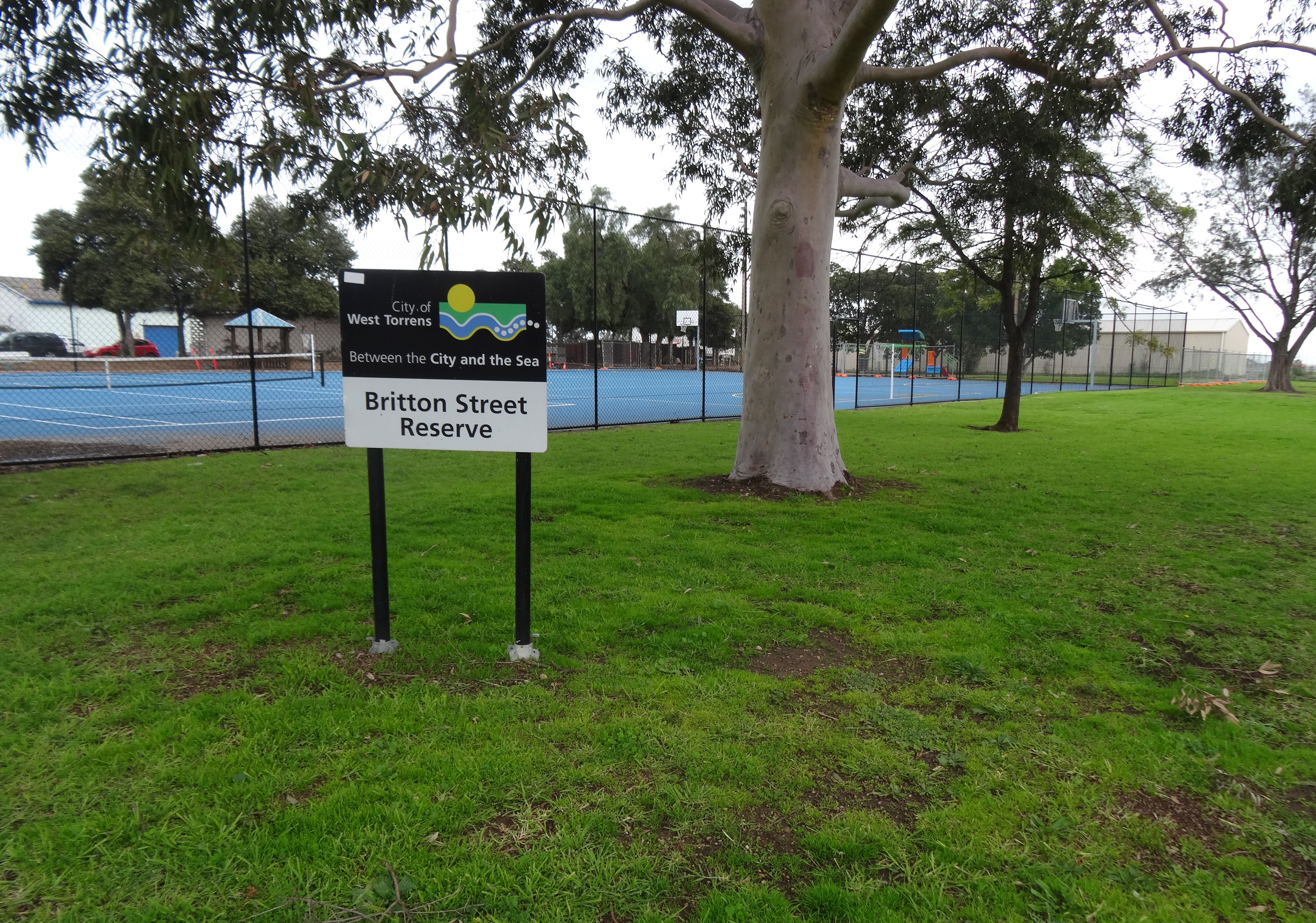
Tennis and Basketball Courts in West Richmond

This small suburb has a small shopping village including a TAB betting venue, a café, a liquor store and newly built McDonalds and Hungry Jack's stores competing alongside each other.

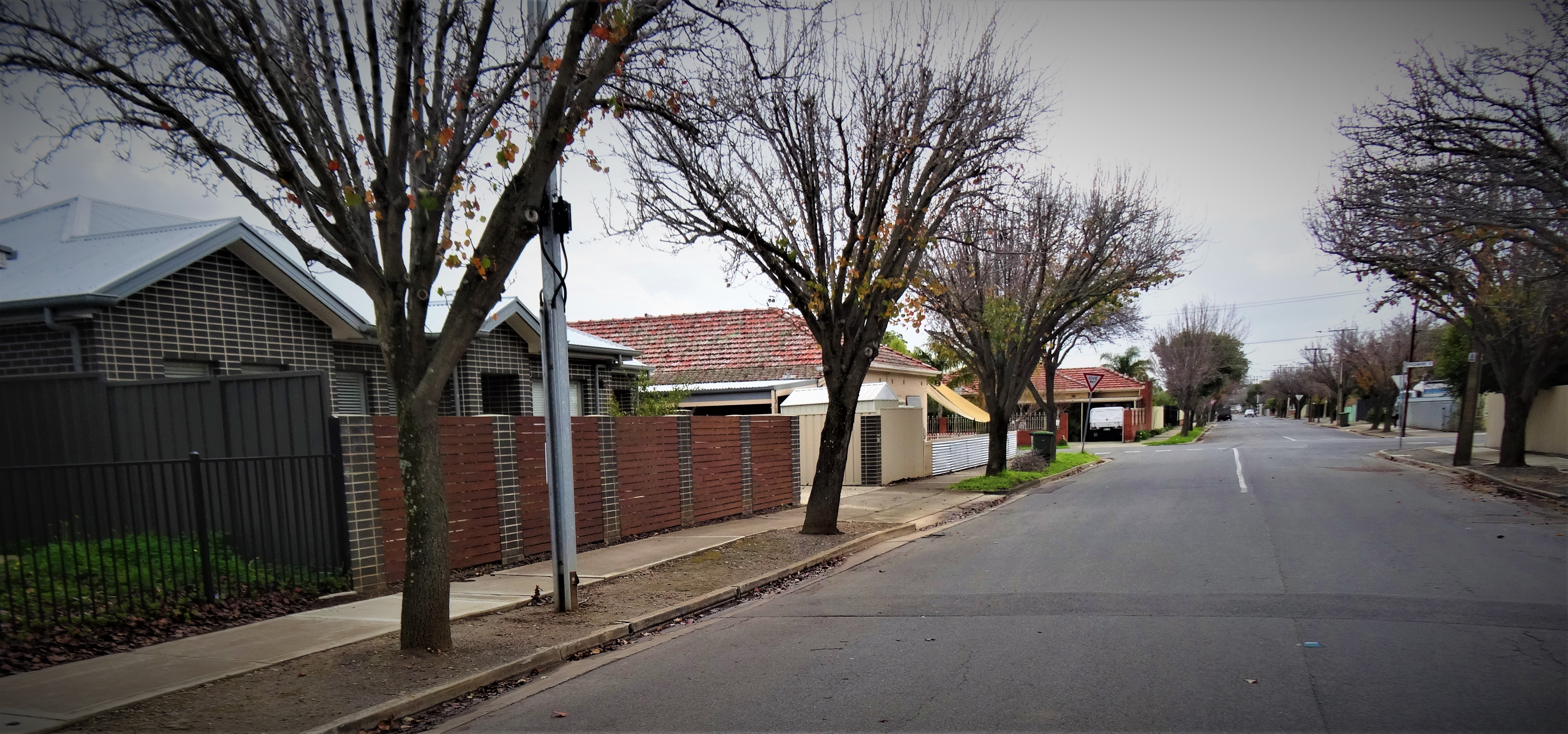
A street in West Richmond
