= North Plympton, South Australia =

North Plympton
- Suburb
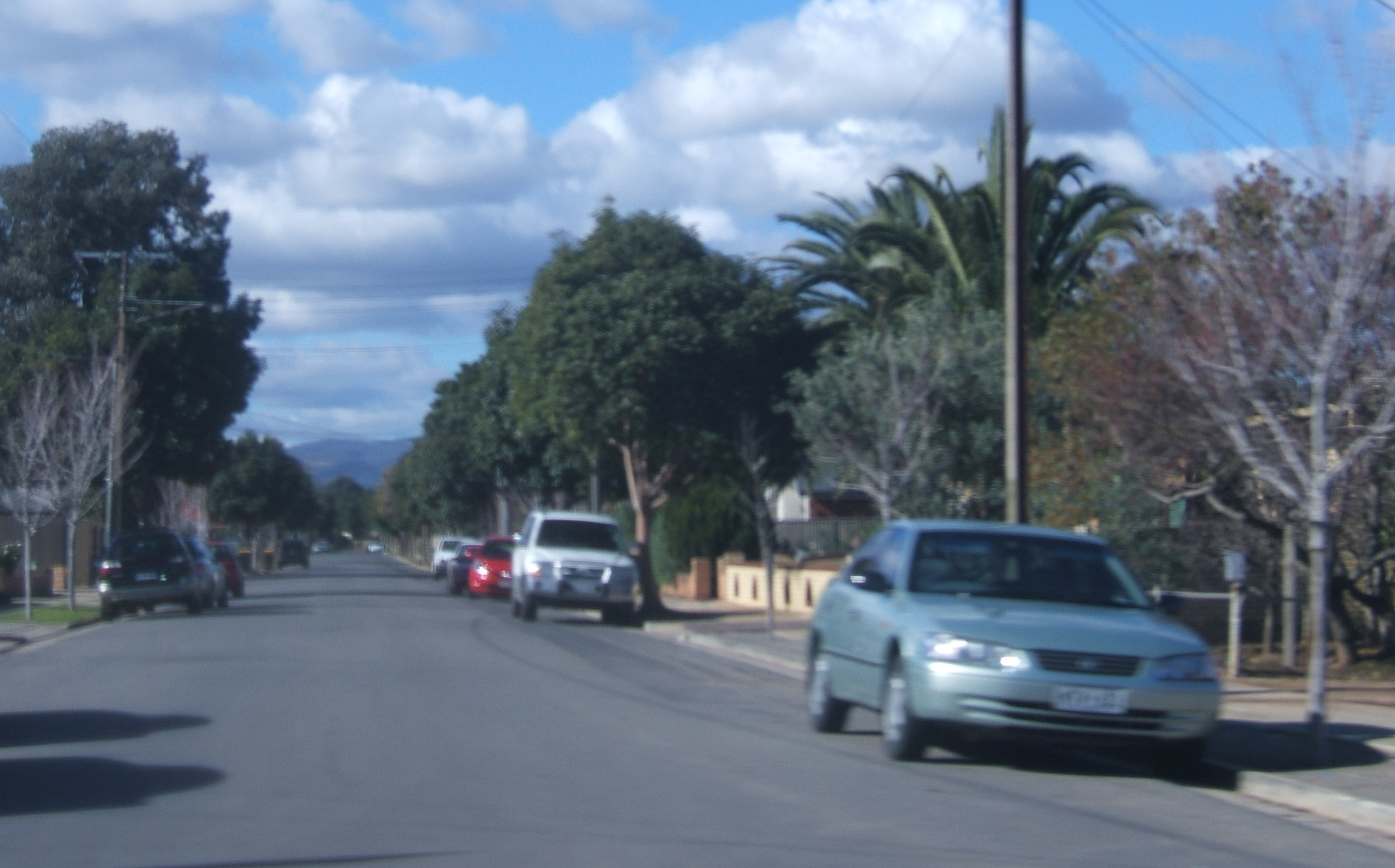
- Suburban street in North Plympton

- Country: Australia
- State: South Australia
- City: Adelaide
- LGA: City of West Torrens

Government
  - State electorate: Badcoe
  - Federal divisions: Adelaide; Hindmarsh

Population
  - Total: 3,610 (SAL 2021)
- Postcode: 5037
Suburbs around North Plympton
Adelaide Airport	Adelaide Airport, Netley, Marleston	Marleston
Adelaide Airport, Novar Gardens	North Plympton	Kurralta Park, Plympton
Novar Gardens	Camden Park, Plympton	Plympton

North Plympton is a suburb of Adelaide, South Australia, in the City of West Torrens.

The historic Parkin House (or Plympton House) which dates from before 1860 and houses an important piano collection, is situated at 4 Lewis Crescent, North Plympton. It is listed on the South Australian Heritage Register.

To the north is Adelaide Airport, Adelaide's main airport.
