= Torrensville, South Australia =

Torrensville
- Suburb
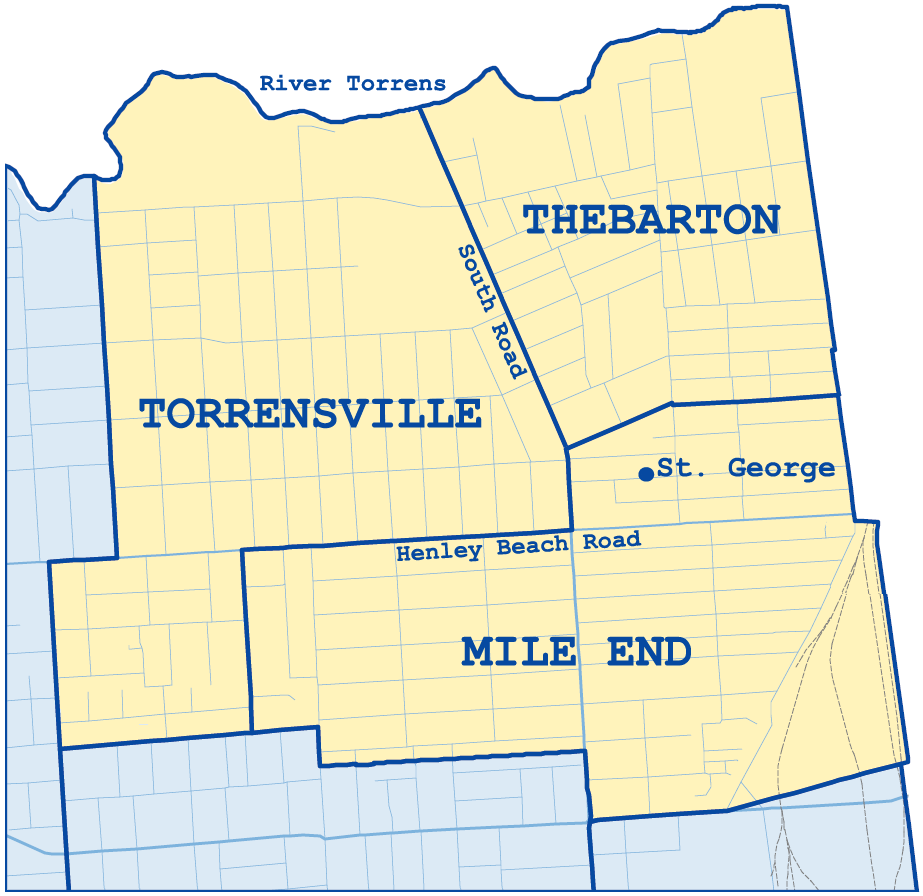
- Torrensville is one of the three adjacent suburbs in West Torrens, that are densely populated by Greek-Australians

- Coordinates: 34°55′S 138°33′E
- Country: Australia
- State: South Australia
- City: Adelaide
- LGA: City of West Torrens
- Location: 2 km (1.2 mi) from Adelaide

Government
  - State electorate: West Torrens
  - Federal division: Adelaide

Population
  - Total: 4,110 (SAL 2021)
- Postcode: 5031
Suburbs around Torrensville
Flinders Park	Allenby Gardens, Welland, West Hindmarsh	Hindmarsh
Underdale, Brooklyn Park	Torrensville	Thebarton, Mile End
Brooklyn Park	Cowandilla	Mile End, Hilton

Torrensville is a western suburb 3 km (1.9 mi) west of the centre of Adelaide, South Australia. It was named after Irish-born economist and chairman of the South Australian Colonisation Commission, Robert Torrens.

Torrensville is in the City of West Torrens local government area, the South Australian House of Assembly electoral district of West Torrens and the Australian House of Representatives Division of Hindmarsh. The area has a high proportion of Greek-Australians.

Revitalisation of the Adelaide's inner suburbs in the 2000s has made Henley Beach Road a vibrant shopping area with many cafes and restaurants.

== History ==
According to the Australian Dictionary of Biography, the suburb was named after Robert Torrens senior, who was chairman of the South Australian Colonisation Commission, which was responsible for setting up and running the colony in its early years.

New Thebarton Post Office opened on 1 November 1879 and was renamed Torrensville in 1909. Torrensville was part of the then largely rural District of West Torrens until 1883, when the residents of the more urban suburbs of Thebarton, Mile End and Torrensville successfully petitioned to become the Corporation of the Town of Thebarton. In 1997 the Town of Thebarton re-amalgamated with the City of West Torrens.

The Star Theatre, at 107 Henley Beach Road, was one of the earliest picture theatres in Dan Clifford's cinema chain, opening in March 1916. It was renamed the Plaza Theatre in 1937, but still operated under Clifford's Star banner, and continued to operate as a cinema until at least 1957. As of 2022 it is operating as the Mile End Office Furniture store.

== Demographics ==
According to the 2016 Australian census, the most common ancestries for Torrensville residents were English (18.8%), Australian (15.9%), Greek (11.8%) and Italian (9.7%) - although 62.4% of respondents were born in Australia. The significant Greek Australian and Italian Australians populations being a result of mass migration in the middle of the 20th century. The 2021 Australian Census identified that 14.8% of residents in Torrensville were of Greek ancestry compared to South Australia 2.7% and Australia 1.7%

Australian Bureau of Statistics data from May 2021 identified Adelaide's western suburbs as having the lowest unemployment in South Australia.

Both the State and Federal MPs, representing the electoral districts that include Torrensville, are notable Greek Australians: Tom Koutsantonis and Steve Georganas of the Australian Labor Party. Their success in winning office could potentially be attributed to the population of Greek Australians in their electoral districts including Torrensville and neighbouring suburbs of Thebarton and Mile End.

== Heritage listings and places of interest ==
=== Brickworks ===
The Brickworks Marketplace, a shopping centre, is on the site of the former brickworks of J. Hallett and Son. It occupies a large block on the corner of South Road and Ashwin Parade, with the Torrens River (Karrawirri Parri) at its northern boundary.

The Hoffman Brick Kiln, Hallett Brickworks (Lot 32 Ashwin Parade) was heritage-listed on the South Australian Heritage Register in 1983. The Brickworks kiln was constructed in 1912 or 1913 in the Hoffman style, and is the last remaining such kiln in Adelaide. A major renovation of the kiln, costing $1.5 million, was effected by the West Torrens Council between 2016 and 2017. The chimney is 42 m (138 ft) high.

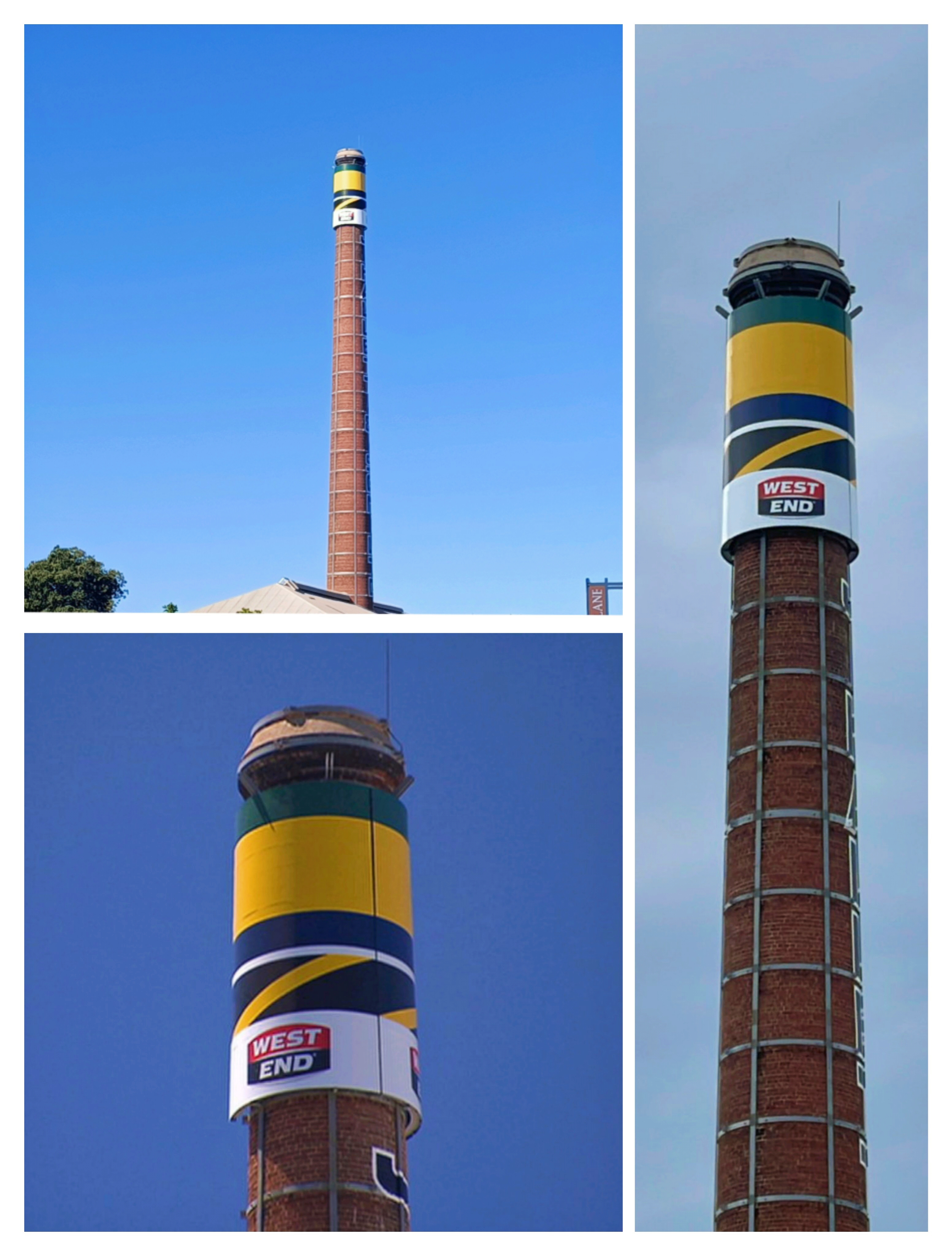
The kiln chimney with the Woodville West Torrens Eagles blue, green and gold colours aloft as 2021 SANFL premiers, above the Glenelg Tigers' black and gold colours as runners-up.

The old brickworks site was converted into a lively market in the late 20th century, with a leisure complex including rides for children, and a multitude of stalls selling goods from fruit and vegetables, to crafted items, jewellery and clothing. This was demolished and a shopping centre built in its place; Brickworks Marketplace, whose largest tenant is Woolworths (Australia), opened on 25 June 2015.

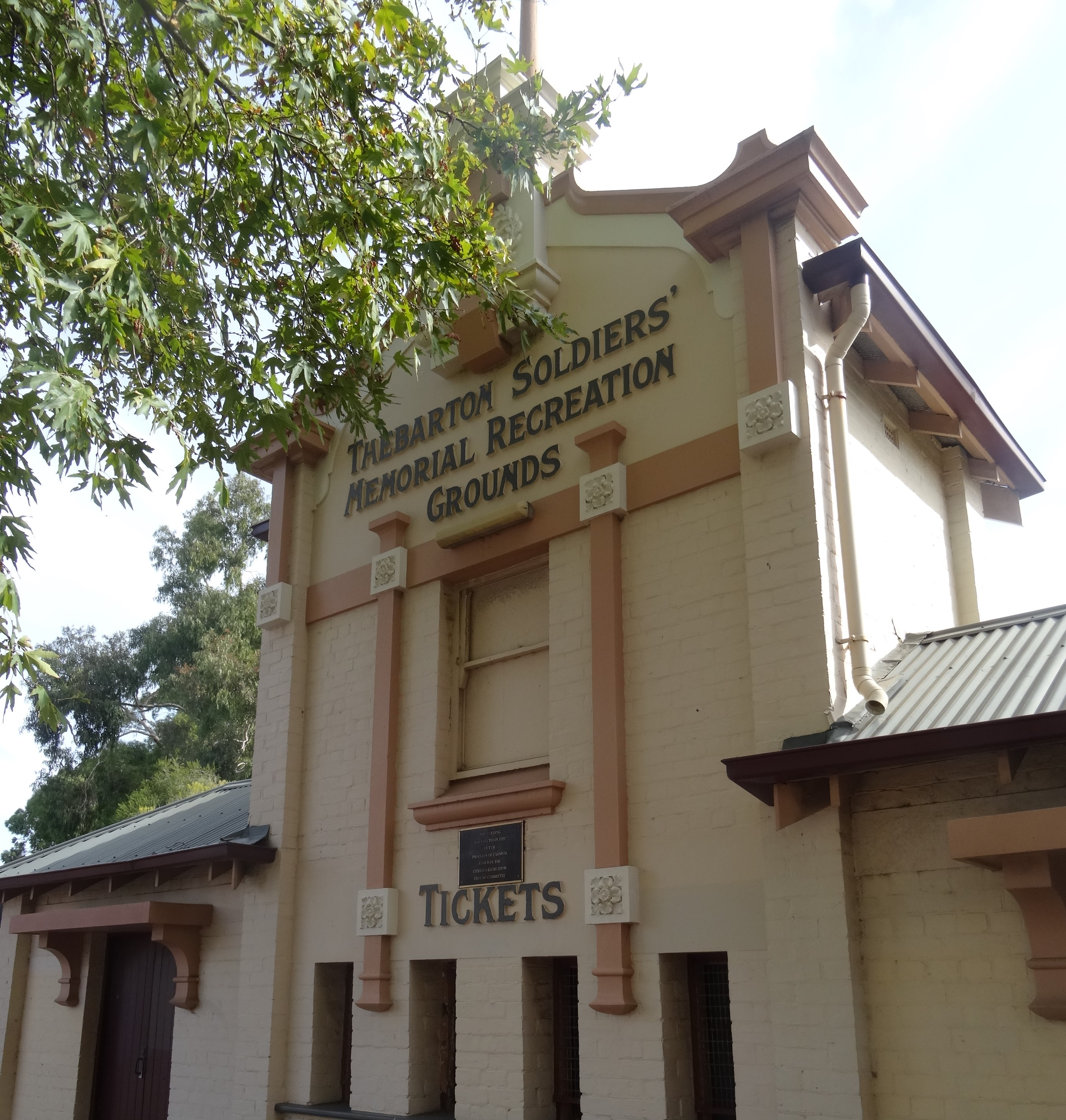
Gate and Ticket Office to Thebarton Oval in Torrensville.

From 2021 the South Australian tradition which commenced in 1954 of placing the SANFL premiership team colours on top of the chimney at the West End Brewery (first in Hindley Street and after 1980 at the Thebarton site), was moved to the Brickworks kiln chimney. The Woodville West Torrens Eagles were the 2021 SANFL Premiers, and after temporary placement on a replica chimney on the day of the ceremony, the colours were unveiled on it on the actual chimney on 19 October 2021. As of 2026, Norwood Football Club colours sit on top of the chimney after defeating Sturt Football Club in the 2026 SANFL Grand Final.

=== Other places ===
- Thebarton Oval, once used as an Australian Rules Football ground by West Torrens Football Club
  - Ashley Street: Gate and Ticket Office, Thebarton Oval was heritage-listed in 1993.
  - The Hotel Royal in Torrensville was built in 1879 and is heritage listed. The West Torrens Council has controversially approved a $4 million upgrade to the hotel in 2022 that has raised concerns from the Art Deco and Modernism, Adelaide Chapter. The concerns are based on the hotel losing its Art Deco elements and characteristics.

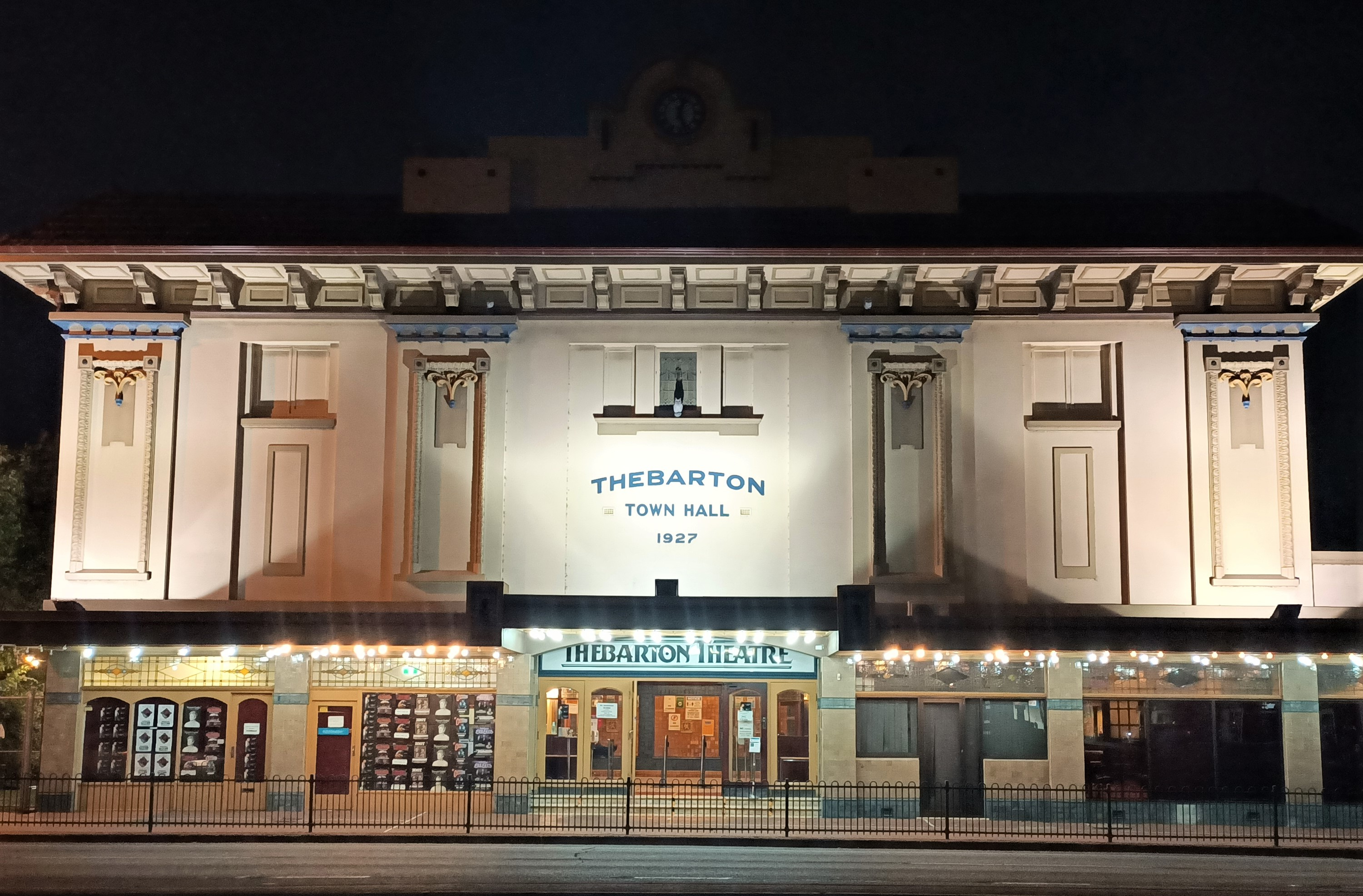
Thebarton Theatre exterior

- Thebarton Theatre, a historic and popular entertainment venue, at 112 Henley Beach Road, heritage-listed in 1982.
- World Series Cricket icon David Hookes grew up on Clifford Street Torrensville and played cricket in Torrensville. There is a monument to him on the corner of South Road and Ashwin Parade, Torrensville.
- 4-8 Hayward Avenue: Torrensville Uniting Church
- 92 South Road: World War Two Civil Defence Sub-Control Station

Acclaimed restaurants Parwana Afgan Kitchen which has attracted celebrities such as Nigella Lawson and the British Raj Restaurant which has been the Indian restaurant of choice for visiting international cricket teams. (The Indian Cricket team has visited the restaurant for many years ) are both in Torrensville. The Indian Cricket teams most recent visit in November 2022 attracted a sea of fans at the restaurant, all gathered outside to catch a glimpse of the cricketers and in particular cricket superstar Virat Kohli. Virat Kohli has scored more runs as a touring player at Adelaide Oval than any other cricketer in history. In November 2024 the Pakistan Cricket Team also visited and ate at the restaurant

The New Indian Express printed in its newspaper that the British Raj in Torrensville is famous in this part of the word for its Indian cuisine.

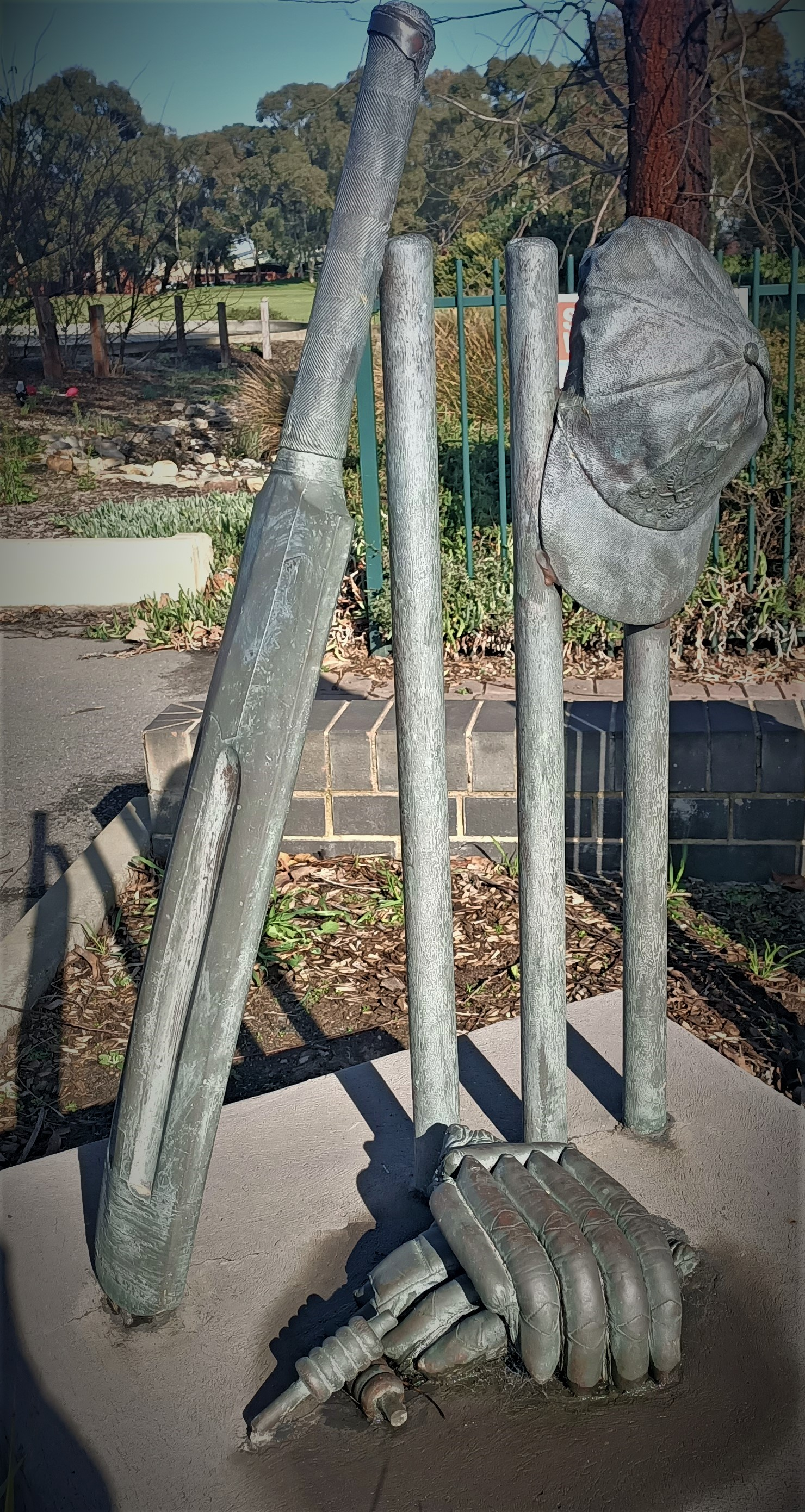
David Hookes monument in Torrensville near Thebarton Oval

== Education ==
- Thebarton Senior College
- Torrensville Primary School
