= Harry Matthias =

Australian cricketer

Personal information
- Full name: Harrison Patterson Ashcroft Matthias
- Born: 25 June 2003 (age 23); Ashford, South Australia
- Batting: Right-handed
- Role: Wicket-keeper

Domestic team information
- Years: Team
- 2022/23–2025/26: South Australia (squad no. 7)

Career statistics
Competition	FC	LA
Matches	2	1
Runs scored	29	14
Batting average	9.66	14.00
100s/50s	0/0	0/0
Top score	12	14
Catches/stumpings	8/0	0/0
- Source: ESPNcricinfo, 22 February 2025

Harrison Patterson Ashcroft Matthias (born 25 June 2003) is an Australian cricketer. He plays for the South Australia cricket team as a wicketkeeper.

Matthias studied at Prince Alfred College. He made his debut for Sturt at the age of 15. Matthias made his first-class debut against Victoria in February 2023, replacing Harry Nielsen who was ill. He was selected in the Cricket Australia XI to play the West Indies in January 2024.

At the end of the 2025-26 season, Matthias was delisted by South Australia, having not been offered a full contract and having become too old to retain a rookie contract.
