= Cowandilla, South Australia =

Cowandilla
- Suburb
- Coordinates: 34.931°S 138.557°E
- Country: Australia
- State: South Australia
- City: Adelaide
- LGA: City of West Torrens

Government
  - State electorate: West Torrens
  - Federal division: Adelaide

Population
  - Total: 1,455 (SAL 2021)
- Postcode: 5033
Suburbs around Cowandilla
| Brooklyn Park | Torrensville | Mile End |
| Brooklyn Park | Cowandilla | Hilton |
| West Richmond | Richmond | Richmond |

Cowandilla is a western suburb in Adelaide, South Australia, in the City of West Torrens. It is located a few kilometres west of the CBD, close to Adelaide Airport. Sir Donald Bradman Drive crosses the middle of the suburb.

Australian Bureau of Statistics data from May 2021 identified Adelaide's Western Suburbs as having the lowest unemployment rate in South Australia.

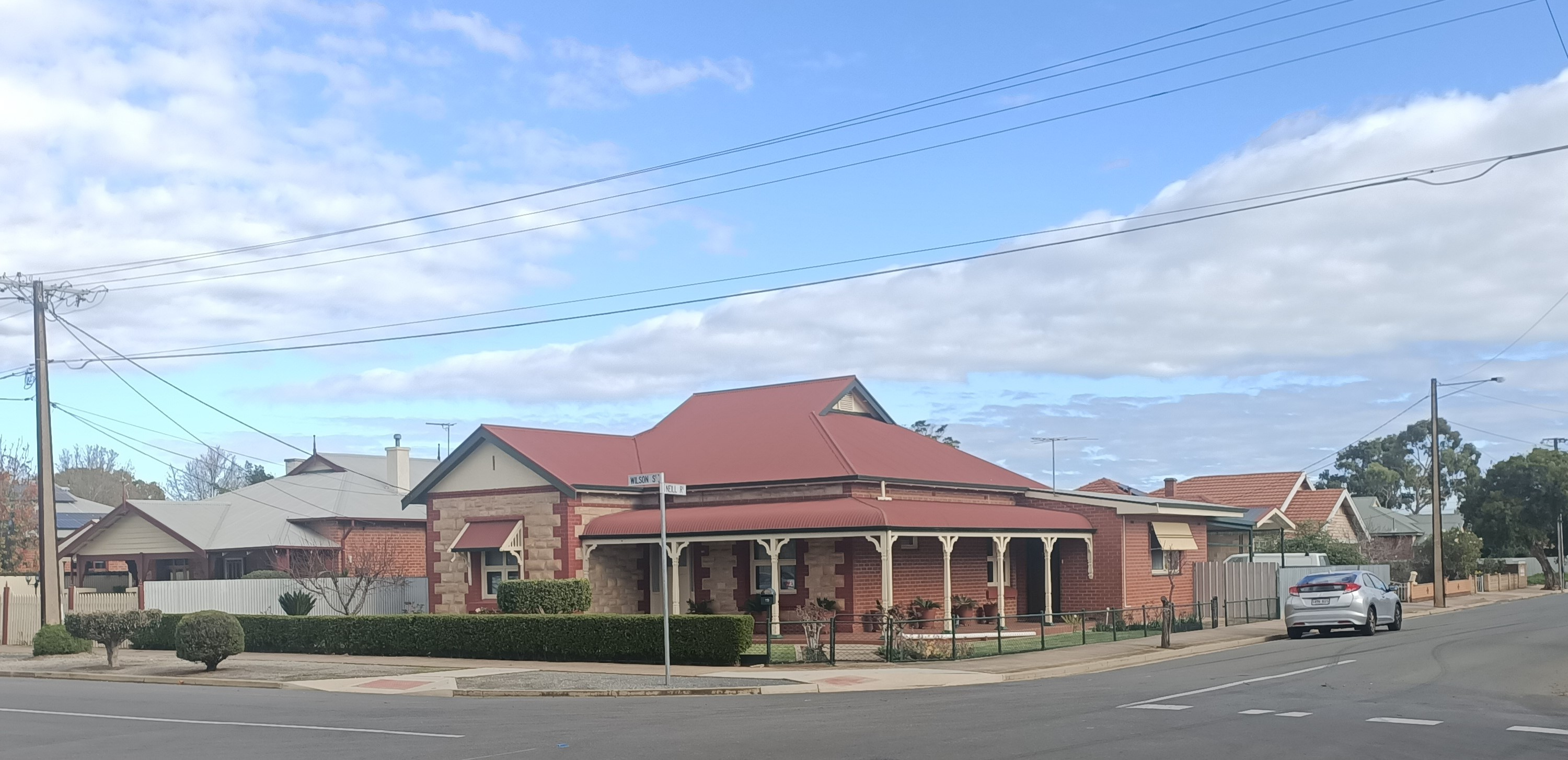
Street corner in Cowandilla today

Cowandilla is home to the renowned Western Youth Centre (established in 1956) which provides a well maintained Oval, Tennis Courts and large clubhouse to a number of sporting teams and societies. Sports such as cricket, soccer, tennis, judo, gymnastics, marching and table tennis are all played at the venue.

The Cactus and Succulent Society of South Australia (established in 1964) is based at the Western Youth Centre, where it holds all its meetings and gatherings. Sophie Thomson, a presenter on the national weekly television show Gardening Australia, is the society's patron.

The intersection of Marion Road and Sir Donald Bradman Drive (Western end of Cowandilla) has been awarded 45 million dollars by the Federal and State Governments for upgrades in 2022

Cowandilla House, which is said to be haunted by the ghost of Mr. Turners late daughter was sold in 2024 for $1.4 Million, which is a record for the small suburb

== Etymology ==
Its name is derived from the Kaurna name Kawandilla (Kawantilla), meaning "in the north". Kauwanta is the Kaurna word for north, and the suffix -illa means "in". However it does not reflect a place known by the Kaurna as Kawandilla (whose location is somewhat vague and possibly non-existent); when the village was established in the present location of the suburb in 1840, the developers gave it this name because they thought it meant something to do with "water" (the word kauwi) (hence also "Kauwantilla"). The whole of Greater Adelaide lies on the traditional lands of the Kaurna people.

== Demographics ==
2021 Australian census data identified that 52% of Cowandilla residents were female compared to South Australia with 50.7% female and Australia also 50.7%. Furthermore the census identified that 11.7% of Cowandilla residents had Greek ancestry compared to 2.7% in South Australia and 1.7% in Australia. The census also found that 5.6% of Cowandilla residents were born in India compared to 2.5% in South Australia and 2.6% in Australia.

== Economy ==
From the 3rd Quarter in 2020 to the 3rd Quarter in 2021, South Australian median house price increased by 9.66% and the Adelaide Metropolitan area rose by 13.82% while the Valuer- General identified that Cowandilla rose by a remarkable 38.77% comparatively, making it a sought after location to live.

== Sport ==
=== Cricket ===
The centre is home to the well supported Western Youth Centre Cricket Club, which was established in 1961 and fields teams in both senior and junior grades. The Oval also has adjoining, well maintained cricket practice nets that are available for public use every day.

Cricket in Cowandilla is fitting as the small suburb has significant cricket heritage. It is where cricket under lights was birthed in 1930 by returned serviceman and tram dispatcher Alf Stone at his Turner Street Cowandilla home (only a few hundred metres from the Western Youth Centre Cricket Club) during the depression. Up to 50 youths were attending his property every night to play under light globes. This led to an 11 team competition playing electric light cricket in the area in the 1930s Bruce Dooland was also born in Cowandilla in 1923. Dooland remained in the area, learning cricket in his Cowandilla backyard before playing for West Torrens, South Australia and Australia (and later Nottinghamshire County Cricket Club, where he was regarded the best bowler in England and the first to reach 100 wickets in the season). His skill was also recognised by his choice for Players against Gentlemen in 1953 and 1954 and in 1950-51 he visited India with the Commonwealth team. He made his highest score, 108 against an Indian XI, at New Delhi. Dooland was described as "the leg spinning magician", who took over 1000 first class wickets and taught Richie Benaud how to bowl the flipper. The flipper would subsequently underpin the success of Shane Warne. Dooland was a Wisden Cricketer of the year in 1955.

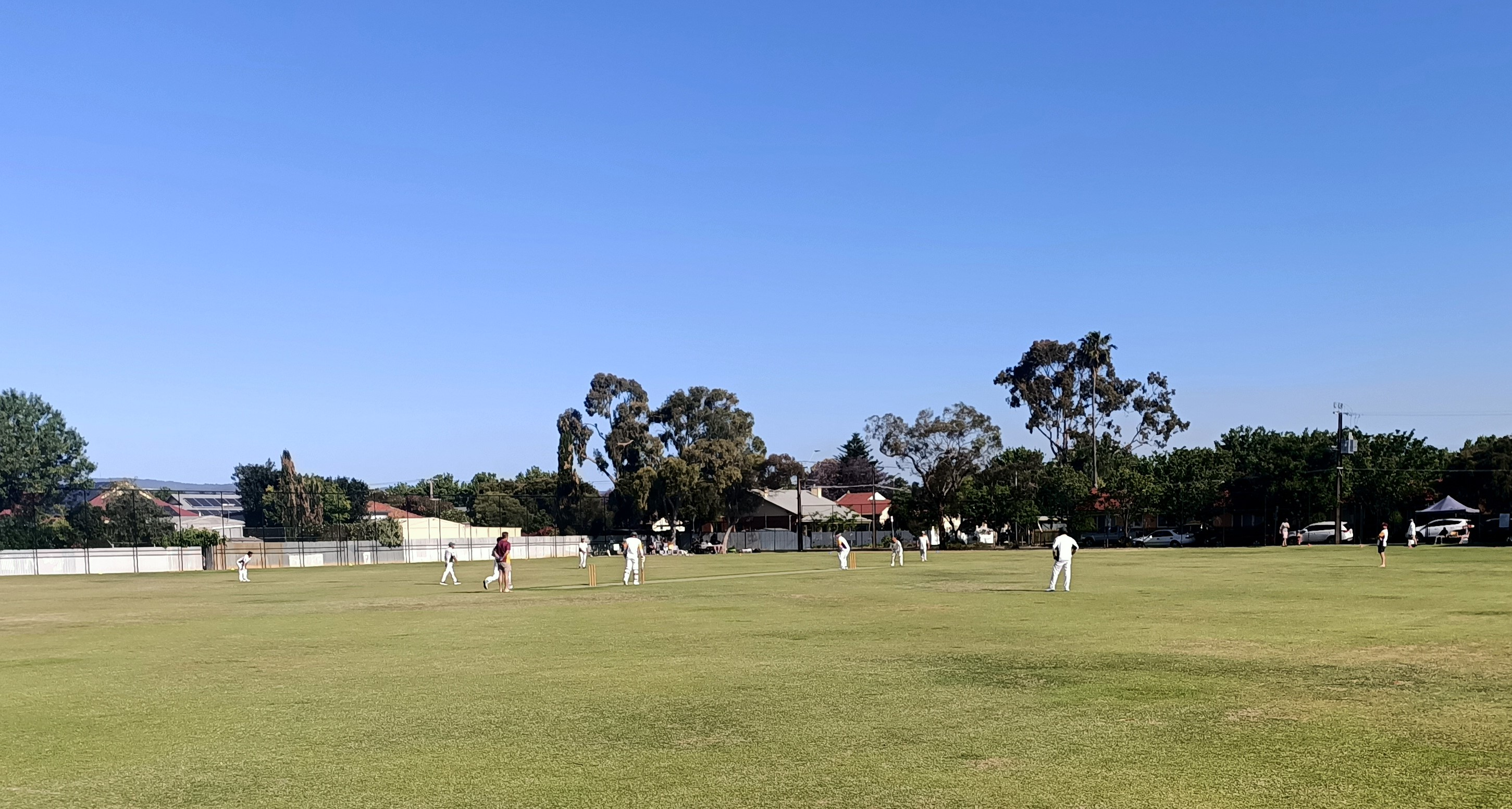
A Club Cricket Match in Cowandilla

=== Tennis ===
The Western Youth Centre Tennis Club also uses the well maintained tennis courts alongside the Oval.

=== Angling ===
The Western Districts Angling Club (established in 1938) resides at the Western Youth Centre.

=== Soccer ===
The Adelaide Red Blue Eagles Football Club, play in the South Australian Amateur Soccer League and call the Western Youth Centre home.

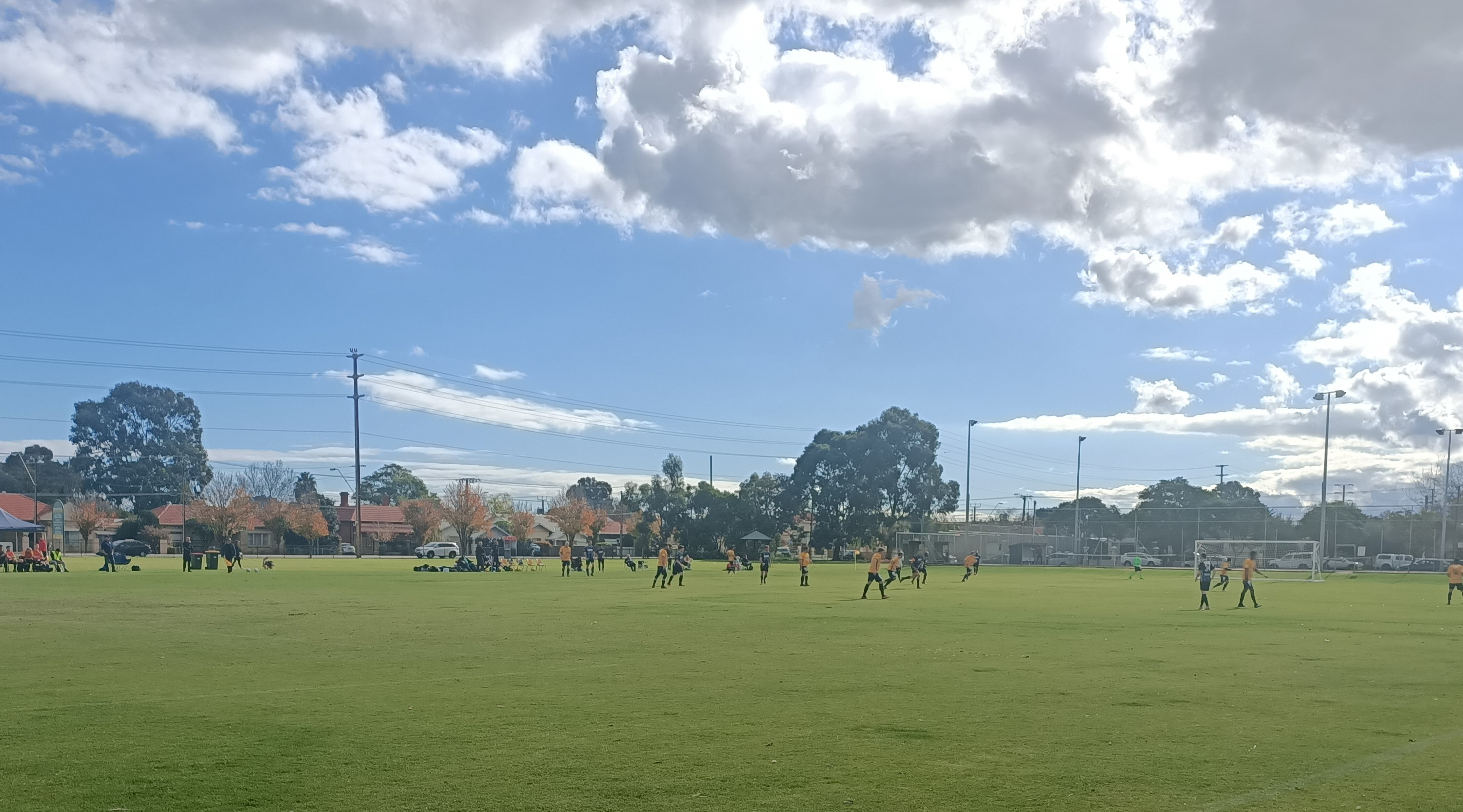
A Soccer game being played at the Western Youth Centre in 2021

== Areas of interest ==
Cowandilla is also home of the Cowandilla Primary School and the Orthodox Coptic Church in South Australia.
