= Adelaide Community Healthcare Alliance =

South Australian private hospital group

Adelaide Community Healthcare Alliance Incorporated

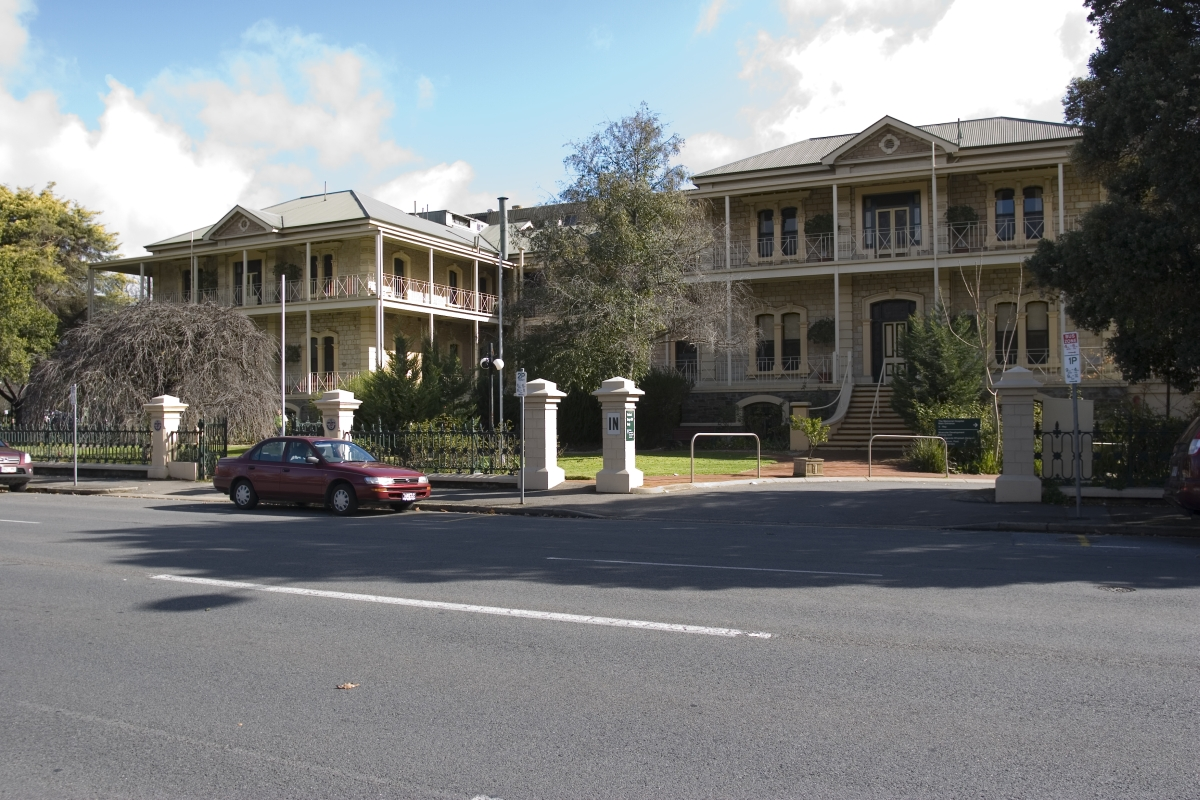
- Memorial Hospital in North Adelaide
- Abbreviation: ACHA
- Established: 14 November 1999; 26 years ago
- Headquarters: 1 Flinders Drive, Bedford Park, South Australia, Australia
- Website: acha.org.au

Adelaide Community Healthcare Alliance is a South Australian private hospital group formed on 14 November 1999. Healthscope has had day-to-day operational responsibility for the hospitals since 2003.

== Hospitals ==
It comprises the following hospitals:

- Ashford Hospital, opened in 1950 as a joint collaboration between Unley, Mitcham, West Torrens and Marion Councils, with a group of western suburbs doctors.
- Flinders Private Hospital opened in 1999 adjacent to Flinders Medical Centre and the Flinders University School of Medicine.
- The Memorial Hospital, North Adelaide opened in March 1919 with the first patient being admitted in 1920 by the South Australian Methodist Conference to honour veterans of World War I.
