= Plympton, South Australia =

Plympton
- Suburb
- Country: Australia
- State: South Australia
- City: Adelaide
- LGA: City of West Torrens

Government
  - State electorate: Badcoe
  - Federal divisions: Adelaide; Hindmarsh

Population
  - Total: 5,459 (SAL 2021)
- Postcode: 5038
Suburbs around Plympton
North Plympton	North Plympton	Kurralta Park
North Plympton, Camden Park	Plympton	Kurralta Park, Glandore
Camden Park, Morphettville	Plympton Park, South Plympton	Glandore

Plympton is a mostly residential inner south-western suburb of Adelaide, South Australia.

== History ==
In 1838, the original village of Plympton was created as a subdivision of section 108, Hundred of Adelaide, located between modern-day Marion Road and Whelan Avenue/Streeters Road. It was acquired by Henry Mooringe Boswarva in association with John Bentham Nealies. Boswarva named the town after his home town, Plympton, in Devon], England, which had been named because of its location on the River Plym.

Plympton Post Office opened on 7 October 1856.

In 1896 a "plumpton" track was established in the area by the Plympton Coursing Company. The Adelaide Plumpton Coursing Club was formed in 1908, with John Creswell as president, to control dog racing at Plympton. The track and adjacent polo grounds later came to be called "Birkalla", after the nearby railway station, though the name "Plympton Plumpton" lingered on.

Prior to World War II, Birkalla was the home of the Adelaide Hunt Club's kennels.

"Plympton" was accepted as an official name for the suburb in 1944.

The Holdfast Bay railway line was opened in 1880 by the Holdfast Bay Railway Company, which soon merged with the company that had built the Glenelg Railway seven years earlier, which was later converted into the Glenelg tram line. Some work was done to convert the Holdfast Bay railway into a tram service, but this was abandoned, and in 1938 the government started selling off the land. The only bit left is the former railway platform at Plympton, next to Marion Road.

== Borders ==
Of irregular shape, the suburb straddles parts of Marion Road, Cross Road and Anzac Highway. To the east of Marion Road it is bounded by the former Holdfast Bay railway line (northwest), Gray and Beckman Streets (east), and the Glenelg tram line (south). To the west of Marion Road it is bounded Mooringe Avenue (north), Streeters Road, and Whelan Avenue (west), and the Glenelg tram line (south).

== Governance ==
Plympton is in the City of West Torrens local government area; the South Australian House of Assembly districts of Badcoe and Morphett; and the Australian House of Representatives divisions of Hindmarsh and Adelaide.

== Facilities and recreation ==
Plympton High School, which opened in 1960 on Errington Street, merged with Camden Primary and Netley Primary Schools in 1998, becoming the William Light R-12 School. In 2017, the school was transformed into Plympton International College, the first bilingual Chinese school in South Australia. Students have daily Chinese lessons from Reception to Year 2 at the school.

Plympton Primary School is at 19 Owen Street.

Plympton's Westside Bikeway, which connects with the Mike Turtur Bikeway, passes the only remnants of the Holdfast Bay railway line.

== In popular culture ==
Plympton is referred to in the song "Plympton High" from the 1993 album True Believers by John Schumann of Redgum. In the song, Schumann writes that he went to Plympton High School.
