= Brooklyn Park, South Australia =

Brooklyn Park
- Suburb
- Coordinates: 34.929°S 138.544°E
- Country: Australia
- State: South Australia
- City: Adelaide
- LGA: City of West Torrens
- Location: 6 km (3.7 mi) W of Adelaide city centre

Government
  - State electorate: West Torrens
  - Federal division: Hindmarsh

Population
  - Total: 5,040 (SAL 2021)
- Postcode: 5032
Suburbs around Brooklyn Park
Lockleys	Underdale	Torrensville
Lockleys	Brooklyn Park	Cowandilla
Adelaide Airport	West Richmond	Richmond

Brooklyn Park is a western suburb of the South Australian capital of Adelaide. It is located immediately north-east of Adelaide Airport and the Australian Federal Police (AFP) base on Sir Donald Bradman Drive (the Boulevard of Honour) . It is bound on the north by Henley Beach Road, on the east by Marion Road, and on the west by the Kooyonga Golf Club on May Terrace.

Brooklyn Park is approximately 6 kilometres (3.7 mi) from the Adelaide coast (West Beach and Henley Beach) and 5.5 kilometres (3.4 mi) from the Adelaide Central Business District. Lockleys Post Office opened on 1 September 1904 and was renamed Brooklyn Park in 1967. Brooklyn Park now includes a subdivision that was originally named Bismarck; it was changed by the Nomenclature Committee to "Weeroopa" in 1918.

The intersection of Marion Road and Sir Donald Bradman Drive (in the southeast corner of Brooklyn Park) was allocated 45 million dollars by the Federal and State Governments for upgrades in 2022.

== Heritage ==
In 2021 there were 22 heritage-listed properties in Brooklyn Park

The suburb has a mix of large 100 year old bungalows with original art deco features and elements, buildings that exemplify mid-century modern architecture and modern homes with large backyards/living space (with some smaller living (units) options).

CoreLogic's "Best of the Best" report released in late December 2020 identified Brooklyn Park on the national list of suburbs around Australia with higher growth in value than any other capital city location in 2020. This growth continued through June 2021, as Brooklyn Park was again listed as one of the price rising suburbs in South Australia. According to CoreLogic, for suburbs with a minimum of 20 sales to April 2021, Brooklyn Park homes took a shorter time on the market to sell than any other Adelaide suburb. The real estate industry cites the location between the city and the sea in addition to the rarity of homes in this area being put up for sale as some of the reasons for this demand.

The Valuer-General identified a 9.08% value increase for South Australian homes from the 2nd quarter in 2020 to the 2nd quarter in 2021. Metro Adelaide had a 13.21% increase. Brooklyn Park recorded a 19.28% increase in value for this same period Brooklyn Park's rise in value has continued through September 2021 with CoreLogic data identifying that across the Adelaide Metropolitan area there was a 19.1% rise in house prices for the twelve months to September 2021, and during that same period Brooklyn Park house prices had risen by 28.7%, remaining well above the Adelaide median house price. From the 3rd Quarter in 2020 to the 3rd Quarter in 2021 South Australian median house price increased by 9.66% and the Adelaide Metropolitan area rose by 13.82% while the Valuer- General identified that Brooklyn Park again rose by 15.25%, increasing the gap above Adelaide median house prices. National data identified Brooklyn Park as one of Adelaide's most sought-after suburbs in 2021 The 2022 median house price in Brooklyn Park had increased 12.08% on 2021 despite Australia's higher interest rate, tighter borrowing capacities and increased cost of living Brooklyn Park was again listed in Australia's top 100 suburbs to watch in 2023. While Australian home values fell by 8.41% from May 22 to Jan 23 amidst record interest rate rises, Brooklyn Park maintained a 1% growth in house value and 10.4% growth in unit value to 2023. In 2025 Brooklyn Park house values grew a further %20.6 over winter alone, placing it as one of the top growing value suburbs in Australia.

== Public institutions ==
1 Previous location, 5AN/5CL transmitters

From 1925, Brooklyn Park was the 6 acres (2.4 ha) site of the transmitting station for radio 5CL, which became an ABC station in 1929. It was then joined by facilities for the second ABC station, 5AN, ten years later. In 1961, with the commissioning of the new Pimpala transmitters, the facility was closed down, then demolished, and replaced by medium-density housing. Reasons for the shift include proximity to Adelaide Airport, encroaching suburbia, and the perceived need to upgrade to more powerful transmitters and a taller, more efficient antenna.

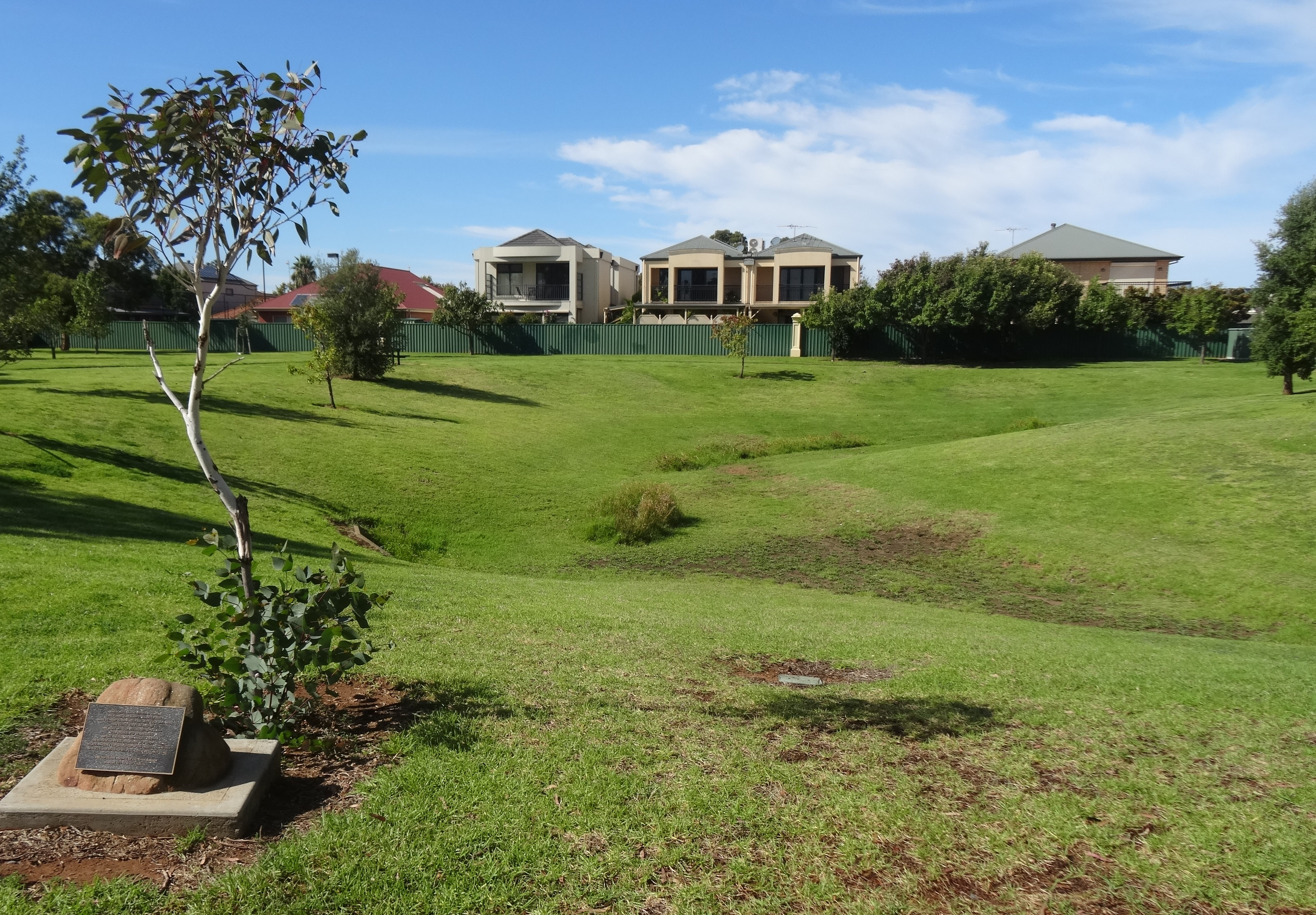
A public space in Brooklyn Park today

Brooklyn Park is the home of the Adelaide Theological Library and is the site of the Uniting College for Leadership and Theology The College moved to the site of the former Salesian College in late 1997. The Salesian College opened as a Catholic boys school in 1954, became open to girls as well in 1978, and closed in 1996. Part of the site is now the campus of Emmaus Christian College. The Brooklyn Park Primary School and the St John Bosco Primary School are also in Brooklyn Park.

Brooklyn Park has a kindergarten and a separate childcare centre.

There are four churches in Brooklyn Park:

- St. John Bosco Catholic Church
- Brooklyn Park Church of Christ
- Adelaide West Uniting Church
- St. Richard's Anglican Church

Brooklyn Park has a joint Metropolitan Fire Service Station and South Australian Ambulance Service Station (one of 21 fire stations and 20 ambulance stations in metropolitan Adelaide).

The 2016 Australian census identified that the median age of Brooklyn Park residents was 36 years (South Australia's median age was 40, and Australia's was 38). In the 2021 Australian census the median age of Brooklyn Park residents was 37 years (South Australia's was 41 and Australia 38). The 2016 census also identified that 25% of Brooklyn Park residents held a Bachelor Degree or higher (while in broader South Australia, 18.5% held a bachelor degree or higher and across Australia that was 22%). The 2021 census identified that 22.7% of Brooklyn Park residents were studying at University compared to 16.7% of South Australians and 15.4% of Australians. The 2021 census also identified that 19.2% of Brooklyn Park residents were Catholic compared to 15.5% of South Australians. The 2021 census identified that Australian and English were the main ancestry responses in Brooklyn Park, but it was also noted that Brooklyn Park also had 9.8% residents of Italian ancestry compared to South Australia's 5.8% and Australia's 4.4%.

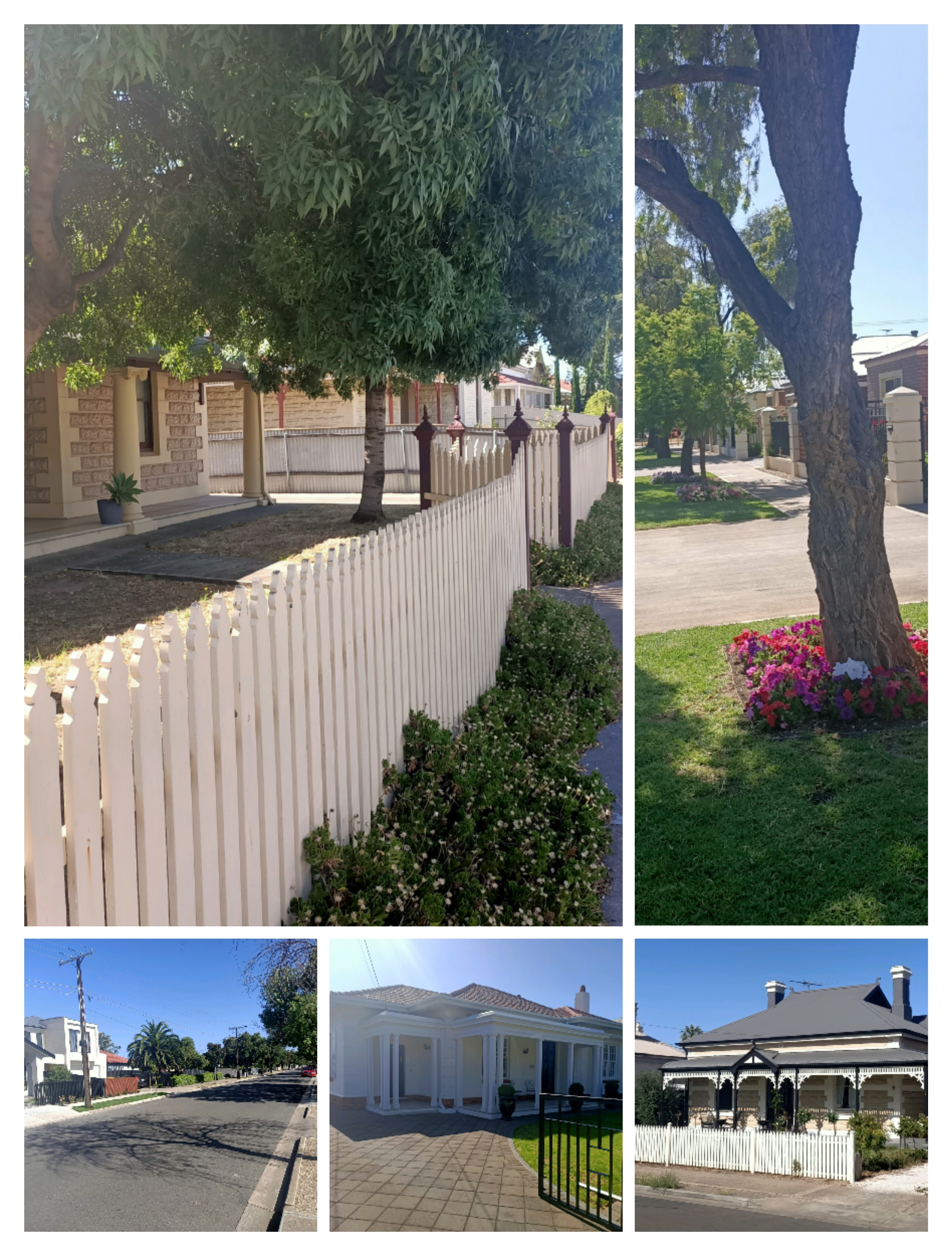
The streets of Brooklyn Park today

The West Torrens Branch of Meals on Wheels is located in Brooklyn Park.

Trees For Life is located in Brooklyn Park. The organisation was established in 1981 and now has over 7,000 active supporters. Trees For Life delivers conservation, revegetation, carbon offsetting community engagement, training programs and services to assist the environment.

The Sparkling Diamonds netball club has its home in Brooklyn Park

The South Australian Orchidaceous Society meets in Brooklyn Park.

The Brooklyn Park Probus Club meets monthly.

The German Club, owned by the South Australian German Association (which was established in 1886) moved to Brooklyn Park after selling its premises in Flinders Street in 2019. The Governor of South Australia opened the first Brooklyn Park Schutzenfest there on 19 April 2021.

The original council, heritage listed building (circ. 1888) on Marion Road, Brooklyn Park has recently been purchased to develop into a vegetarian restaurant, wine bar, distillery and craft brewery. This site will be home to a restaurant, which opened in 2023.

== Jack McGowan stables ==
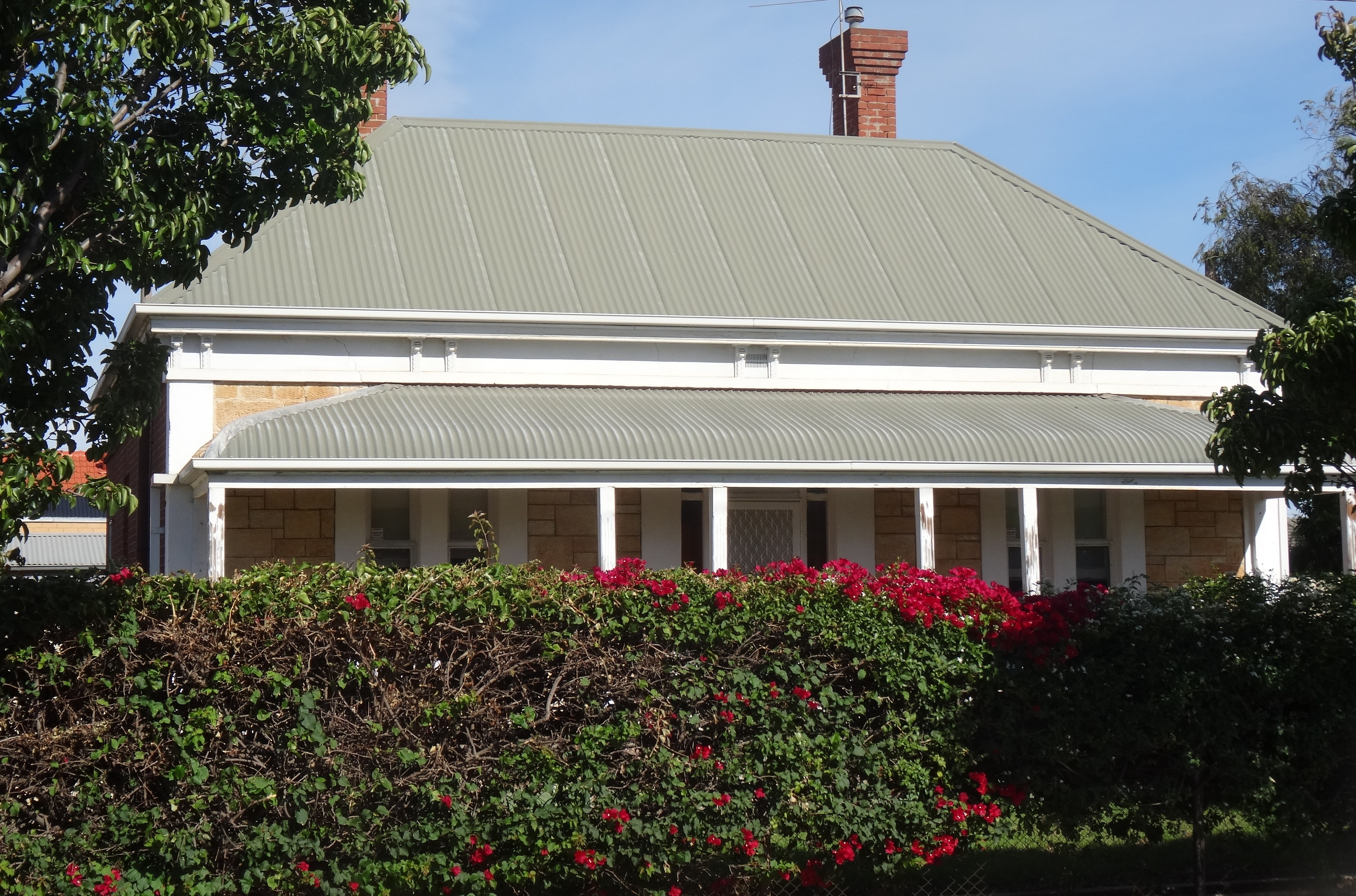
The family residence of Jack and Emily McGowan and their children (including Mary McGowan), and site of their horse stables

As an area with significant horse racing heritage, Brooklyn Park was home to the Stables of Jack McGowan. Jack was one of five brothers who were all jockeys (and at one time famously all rode in the same race at Ballarat.) Jack's brother Paddy McGowan, who won the 1890 Caulfield Cup and 1891 Australian Cup on "Vengeance", was killed in a race fall at Flemington in 1894 a year after another brother Edward was killed after a horse fall at the Old Adelaide Race Course in 1893.

Jack McGowan (died 1950) was South Australia's leading cross-country jockey in the late 1800s, early 1900s winning the A.R.C Grand National Hurdle at Victoria Park on "Jack Spratt" and again on "All Fours" as well as the Harry D. Young Hurdle and the Oakbank Hurdle at the Oakbank Racecourse. He also ran close seconds in the Great Eastern Steeple Chase on "Edirol" and the Oakbank hurdle on "Culluleraine". He won the Victorian Racing Club (VRC) Cup Hurdle on "Fairlight" and was a regular winning jockey in all forms of Thoroughbred Racing around Adelaide at Victoria Park, Morphettville and Cheltenham Park racecourses over many years.

Jack McGowan's Brooklyn Park stables were extensive and in 1903 he offered to buy Paula Street, Brooklyn Park from the West Torrens Council to assist in its upkeep and the development of the area. Jack's sons Bill and John were successful horsemen, with John (also a district cricketer for the Adelaide Cricket Club) at one point riding 7 winners in a row and winning 22 hurdle and steeple races in one year which was a record while one of Jack's daughters, Mary McGowan, was a well known pioneer horsewoman and jockey of great skill who won 16 trophies in 16 races in the 1920s. Mary married local Malcolm Allan who was one of South Australia's most skilled and leading horsemen. Allan rode many harness racing winners in the 1920s at Thebarton Oval when Trotting was in its fledgling years in South Australia, while also being successful in Thoroughbred Racing at the same time (with winners such as "Taurus" and "Strangway") before shifting to harness racing full time. With the rapid rise of trotting (harness racing) in South Australia with legalised betting in 1934, Adelaide's harness racing meetings became the talk of Australia. In February 1941 it was calculated that public attendances at Adelaide trotting were equating to 1 tenth of the population of Adelaide on any given night at Wayville. it was in this sport and during this period that Allan won hundreds of races, and various awards including the Wade Cup (awarded for having the most winners in a year), the Brennan Gold Cup, The Gawler Cup, The ANA Cup, the S.A Trotters Cup, the Hambletonian Cup, the Candy Cup, and the Goshen Cup at Wayville from the Goshen Club in New York. Allan lived and kept horses in Brooklyn Park during these early years and was a pioneer in the sport of trotting/harness racing in South Australia riding horses such as "Red Satin", "Red Love", "Western Queen" and "Claridge" at Jubilee Oval, Thebarton Oval, Wayville and Globe Derby He later trained and rode horses that were owned by South Australian parliamentarian, the Hon. Leslie "Larry" Heath. Allan won the last race he participated in, at Globe Derby in 1972 on a horse named "Mamre". Malcolm Allan's nephew and Jack McGowan's grandson Steven Mowday (who was raised and schooled in Brooklyn Park as an inaugural St John Bosco Primary School student in 1954) was understudy to and took over from Allan, collecting his first harness racing win on the same horse "Mamre" in 1971.

== Residents ==
Notable Brooklyn Park residents in recent years have included multiple ARIA winning classical guitarist Slava Grigoryan and his cellist wife Sharon, who was a member of the Australian String Quartet.
