= Mile End South, South Australia =

Mile End South
- Suburb
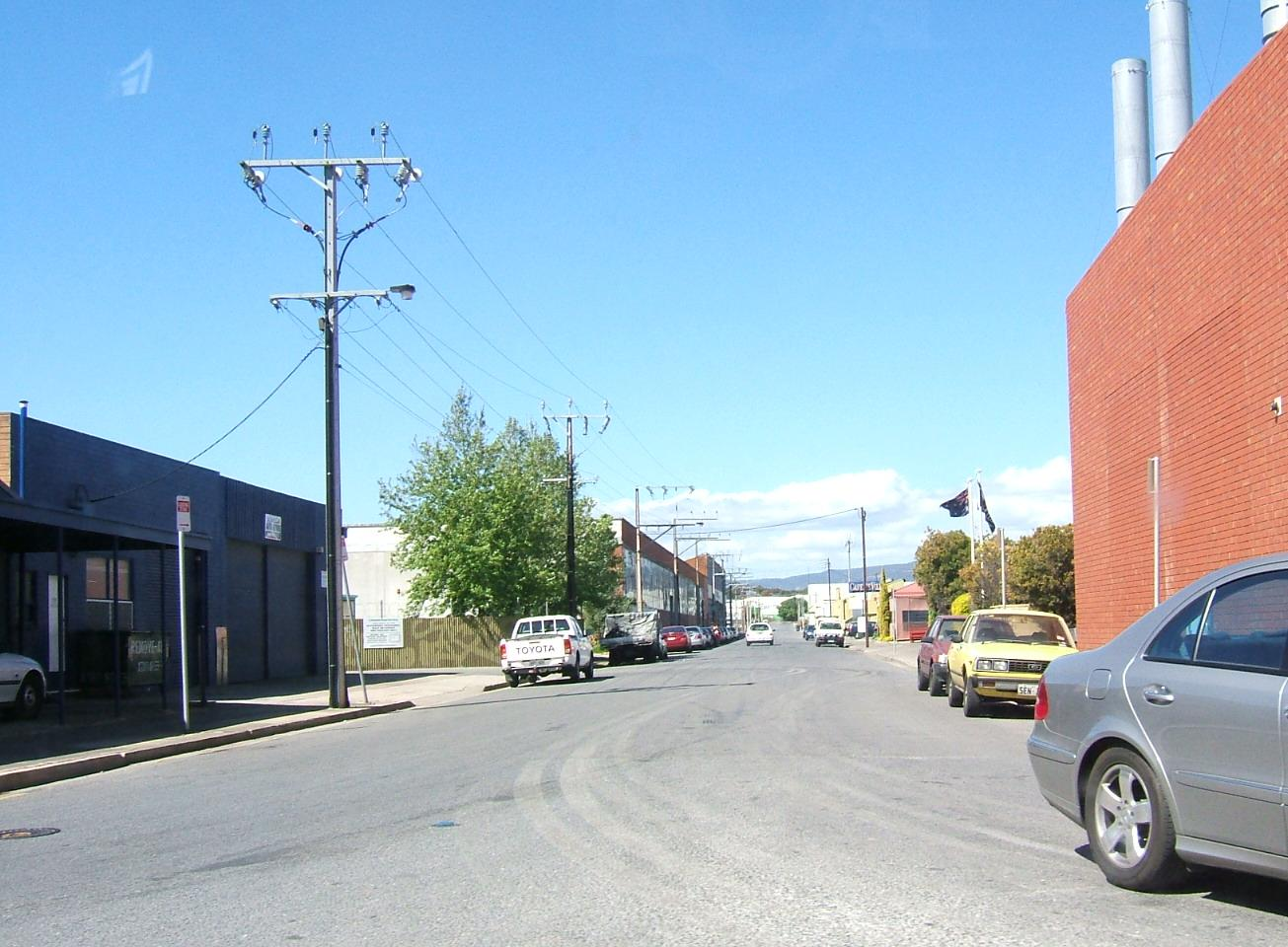
- Street in Mile End South

- Country: Australia
- State: South Australia
- City: Adelaide
- LGA: City of West Torrens

Government
  - State electorate: West Torrens
  - Federal division: Adelaide

Population
  - Total: 19 (SAL 2021)
- Postcode: 5031
Suburbs around Mile End South
Hilton	Mile End	Railway Yards
Hilton Richmond	Mile End South	Keswick Terminal
Marleston	Keswick	Keswick

Mile End South, a suburb of Adelaide, South Australia, is in City of West Torrens. The name, denoting an area south of Mile End, was in use as early as 1913, but was only formally adopted by the state's nomenclature committee in 1944.
