= Hilton, South Australia =

Hilton
- Suburb
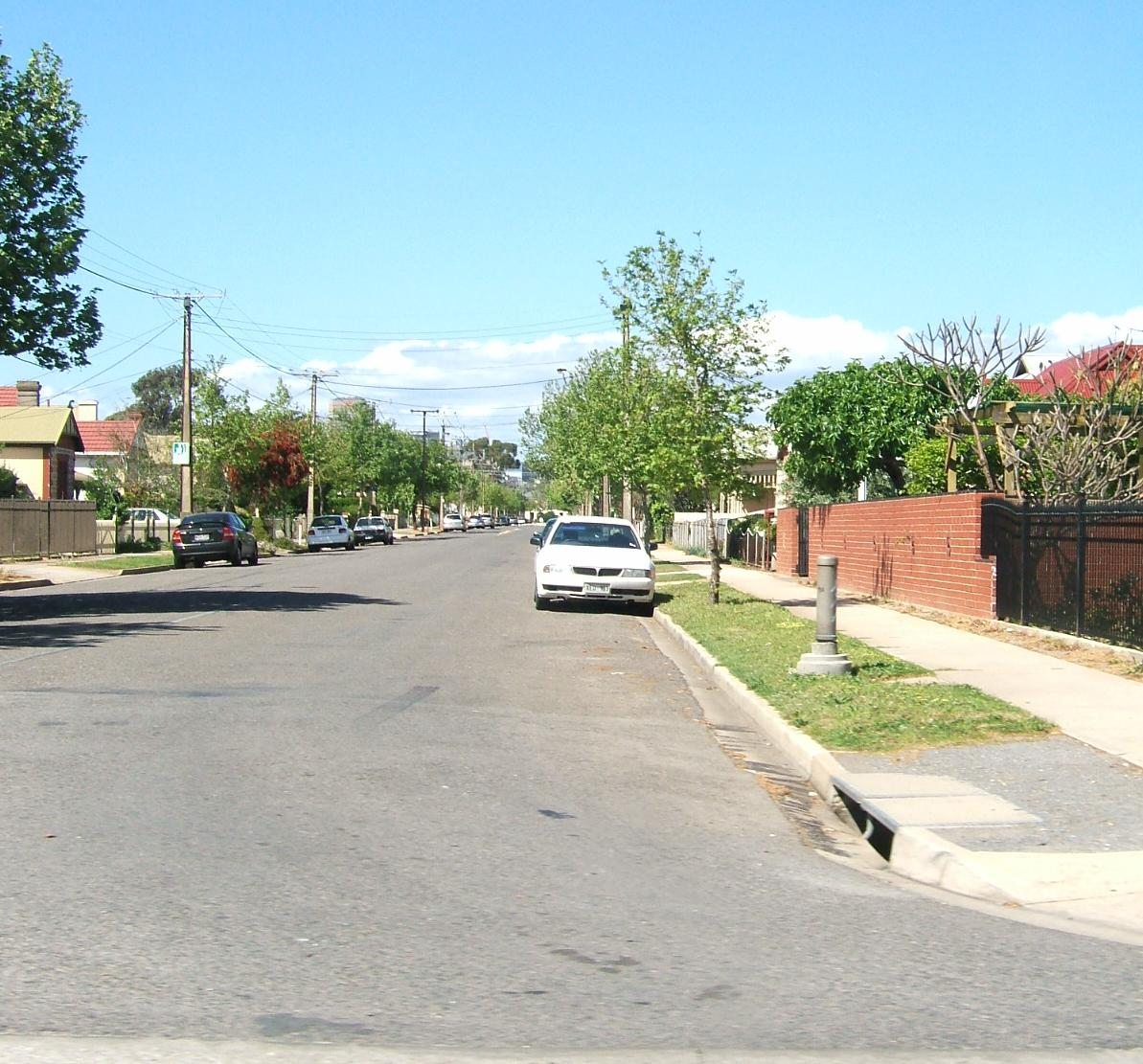
- Residential street in Hilton

- Country: Australia
- State: South Australia
- City: Adelaide
- LGA: City of West Torrens
- Location: 2.8 km (1.7 mi) W of Adelaide city centre
- Established: c. 1849

Government
  - State electorate: Ashford (2011)
  - Federal division: Adelaide

Population
  - Total: 908 (SAL 2021)
- Postcode: 5033
Suburbs around Hilton
Cowandilla	Mile End	Mile End
Cowandilla	Hilton	Mile End, Mile End South
Cowandilla	Richmond	Mile End South

Hilton is an inner western suburb of Adelaide, South Australia. It is located in the City of West Torrens, for which it is the council seat.

== History ==
The Kaurna people occupied the land of the present suburb, before British colonisation of South Australia in 1836.

The land now covering the suburb of Hilton was received by Matthew Davenport Hill in 1839. About ten years later, the "Village of Hilton" was laid out by his attorney, George Milner Stephen.

The 1935 West Torrens Council Chambers are listed on the South Australian Heritage Register.

== Geography ==
Hilton is a rectangular suburb, lying across Sir Donald Bradman Drive.

== Demographics ==
In the 2021 Australian census, there were 908 people in Hilton. Of these, 59.7% of people were born in Australia and 58.5% of people spoke only English at home. The most common responses for religion were "No Religion" at 38.4%, and Catholic at 15.2%.

== Media ==
The local newspaper was the Weekly Times Messenger. Other regional and national newspapers such as The Advertiser and The Australian are also available.

== Facilities and attractions ==
The West Torrens Civic Centre (council offices) are on the corner of Sir Donald Bradman Drive and Brooker Terrace. The West Torrens Library is located next door.

Hilton Plaza shopping centre is located on the corner of Sir Donald Bradman Drive and Bagot Avenue.

The Hilton RSL has served the public since 1930 and overseas a large annual ANZAC Day dawn service.

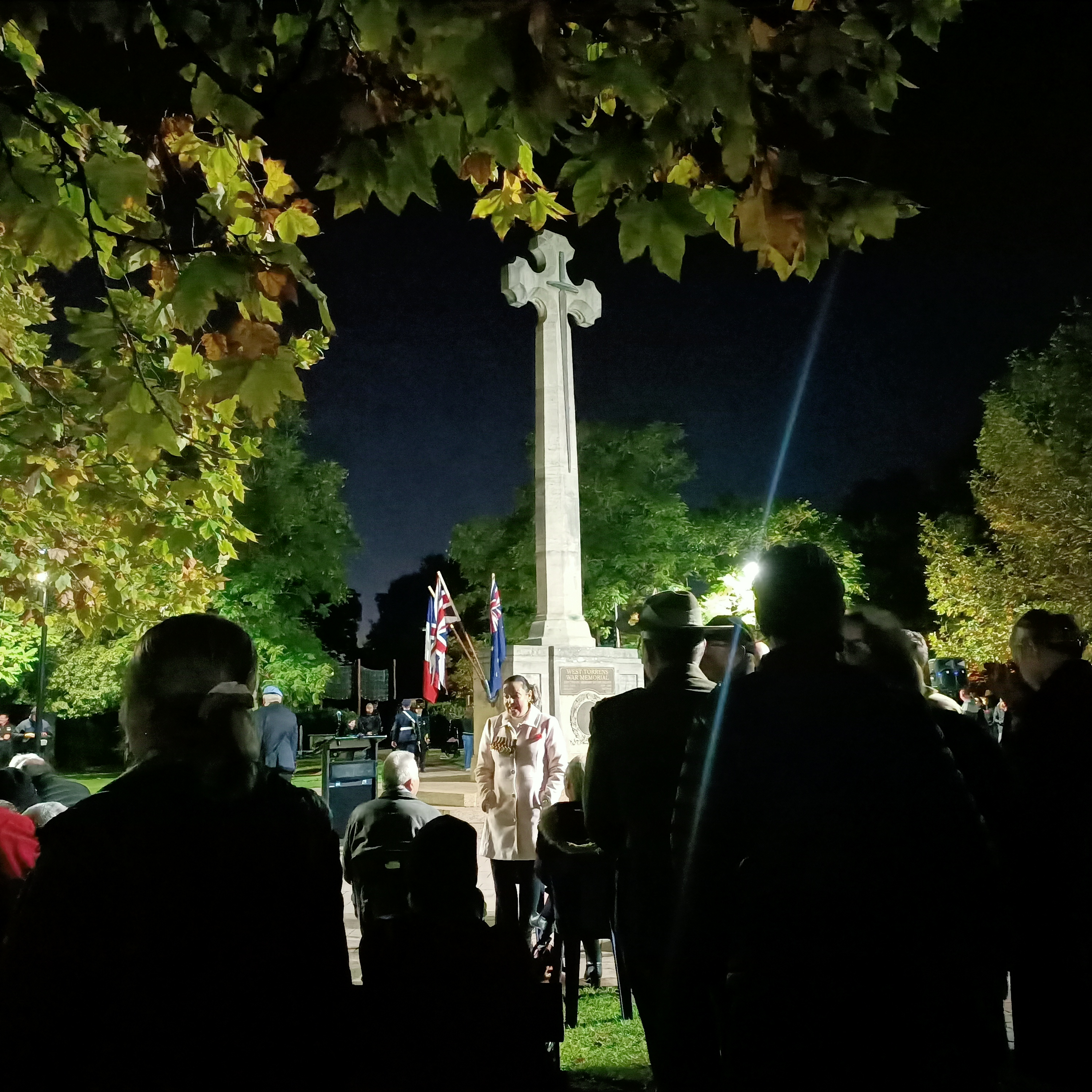
Hilton RSL ANZAC Day dawn service

=== Star Theatres ===
The Star Theatres One and Two are located on a corner block at 145 Sir Donald Bradman Drive. The building incorporates three performance spaces, two theatres and a studio.

The first building on the site was a tin shed, erected in 1923 for soldiers returning from war, and known as the Soldiers Memorial Institute. This was replaced by a stone and brick building in 1928, which forms the basis of the current building. In the early 1930s, it catered for activities such as dances, roller skating, and "electric light cricket".

In 1937 an entrance foyer, "ladies retiring room", and a projection room was added to convert the hall into a cinema, which opened on 7 April 1937 as the Lyric Theatre. When the Windsor cinema chain took it over in February 1948, it became the Windsor Theatre, but by 1949 the lease had been acquired by Ozone Theatres Ltd.

In 1956, the rear of the theatre was enlarged and a larger screen installed, but films were only shown on Saturdays and the hall was leased out for other uses during the week. Its name was changed to Star Theatres (indicating ownership by D. Clifford Theatres), but audiences dwindled around 1959 as drive-in theatres became more popular. the Windsor chain relinquished its lease in 1961. In its later years as a cinema, it showed Greek films.

In 1962, the building was leased to John Edmund and Donald Grey, who started mounting live theatre productions in a theatre in the round formation, adopting the name Theatre 62, marking the year of its establishment. The library was finally moved out of the theatre in 1970, the Soldiers Memorial Institute was disbanded, and the local council took over management of the venue.

In 1981 the council purchased the old Baptist church next door and joined the two buildings, creating "Theatre 62 and The Chapel". Carclew Youth Theatre were based at the venue. In 1985 the council refurbished the building, and Mighty Good Entertainment became a partner in the management team.

In 2002 it changed its name to Star Theatres One and Two. Theatre One is the larger venue, seating up to 336, while Theatre Two (in the refurbished chapel) is an intimate theatre, with a seating capacity of 72.

In 2023, Mighty Good Productions celebrates its 30th anniversary of holding the lease on the theatre, during this time producing at least 75 original productions. The theatres have also hosted many different productions by other groups of all kinds, including annual performances for primary, secondary schools, dance, drama and singing schools, as well as Adelaide Fringe performances in March. The Mighty Good Talent School is in its 44th year of teaching in 2023.

The establishment was the victim of three burglaries over three months in early 2024, with cash, musical instruments, and other equipment stolen. Insurance coverage left a shortfall of A$10,000, so longtime Star employee Luke Bartholomew set up a GoFundMe page to help cover the gap.

== Transport ==
Road transport uses Sir Donald Bradman Drive, connecting the suburb to Adelaide City Centre.

Hilton is serviced by public transport buses run by the Adelaide Metro. As of 2022 the bus routes that serve Hilton are 163. 720; the Adelaide Airport routes J1 and J2; and school services 652 and 653.

Until 1929, the Holdfast Bay railway line ran through Hilton.

== See also ==
- List of Adelaide suburbs
