= City of West Torrens =

Coordinates: 34°57′S 138°35′E

- Local government area
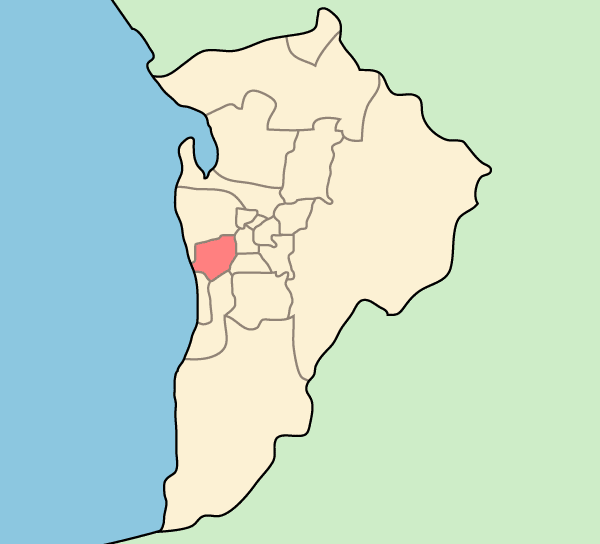

- Interactive map of City of West Torrens
- Country: Australia
- State: South Australia
- Region: Western Adelaide
- Council seat: Hilton

Government
  - Mayor: Michael Coxon
  - State electorate: Colton, Badcoe, West Torrens, Morphett
  - Federal division: Adelaide, Hindmarsh

Area
  - Total: 37.07 km^{2} (14.31 sq mi)

Population
  - Total: 61,699 (LGA 2021)
  - Density: 1,689/km^{2} (4,370/sq mi)
- Website: City of West Torrens
LGAs around City of West Torrens
	City of Charles Sturt	City of Adelaide
	City of West Torrens	City of Unley
City of Holdfast Bay	City of Marion	City of Marion

The City of West Torrens is a local government area in the western suburbs of Adelaide, South Australia. Since the 1970s, the area was mainly home to many open spaces and parks, however after the mid-1990s (1993–1995) the LGA became more residential.

== History ==
It was established on 7 July 1853 as the District Council of West Torrens, which was one of the first local governments to be formed in South Australia following the passage of the District Councils Act 1852. It became smaller over time as a number of areas within the original boundaries split off to form new municipalities: the Holdfast Bay area became part of the new Corporate Town of Glenelg on 23 August 1855, the Thebarton area seceded as the Corporate Town of Thebarton on 8 February 1883, and the West Beach area seceded as part of the Corporate Town of Henley and Grange on 4 December 1915. It gained an area from the District Council of Marion on 15 January 1903, but subsequently lost the same area to the Glenelg council. Further areas of West Torrens were severed and added to Glenelg in 1928, 1932 and 1950.

It became a municipal corporation as the Corporate Town of West Torrens on 1 January 1944, and gained city status as the City of West Torrens on 1 July 1950. It absorbed the former Corporate Town of Thebarton on 1 March 1997, briefly being renamed the City of West Torrens Thebarton before reverting to its original name several months later.

== Council ==
The current council as of November 2022 is:

Ward	Party	Councillor	Notes
Mayor	Independent	Michael Coxon	Elected 2018
Airport	Independent	Jassmine Wood	Elected 2018
Airport	Independent	Sara Comrie	Elected 2022
Hilton	Independent	Cindy O'Rielley	Elected 2010
Hilton	Independent	George Vlahos	Re-elected 2024
Keswick	Independent	John Woodward	Elected 2014
Keswick	Independent	Elisabeth Papanikolaou	Elected 2018
Lockleys	Independent	Kym McKay	Elected 2003
Lockleys	Independent	Daniel Huggett	Elected 2018
Morphett	Independent	Anne McKay	Elected 2018
Morphett	Independent	George Demetriou	Re-elected 2022
Plympton	Labor	Surender Pal	Elected 2018
Plympton	Liberal	Lana Gelonese	Elected 2022
Thebarton	Labor	Graham Nitschke	Elected 2014
Thebarton	Labor	Zoi Papafilopoulos	Elected 2022

== Suburbs ==
The City of West Torrens contains the following suburbs:

- Adelaide Airport
- Ashford
- Brooklyn Park
- Camden Park
- Cowandilla
- Fulham
- Glandore
- Glenelg North
- Hilton
- Keswick
- Keswick Terminal
- Kurralta Park
- Lockleys
- Marleston
- Mile End
- Mile End South
- Netley
- North Plympton
- Novar Gardens
- Plympton
- Richmond
- Southwark
- Thebarton
- Torrensville
- Underdale
- West Richmond
- West Beach

== Mayors (formerly Chairmen) of West Torrens ==
- Alexander Ferris Scott (1935-1937)
- Alfred Burt (1937-1939)
- Arthur McLean (1939-1940)
- Hurtle Henry Norman (1940-1941)
- Howard Edward Comley (1941-1946)
- Charles Richard John Veale (1946-1954)
- Robert James Bartlett (1954-1961)
- Stephen John (Steve) Hamra (1961-1976)
- Reece Jennings (1976-1977)
- Stephen John (Steve) Hamra (1976-1989)
- George Robertson (1989-1998)
- Reece Jennings (1999-2000)
- John Trainer (2000-2018)
- Michael Coxon (2018-present)

== See also ==
- List of Adelaide parks and gardens
