= Kurralta Park, South Australia =

Kurralta Park
- Suburb
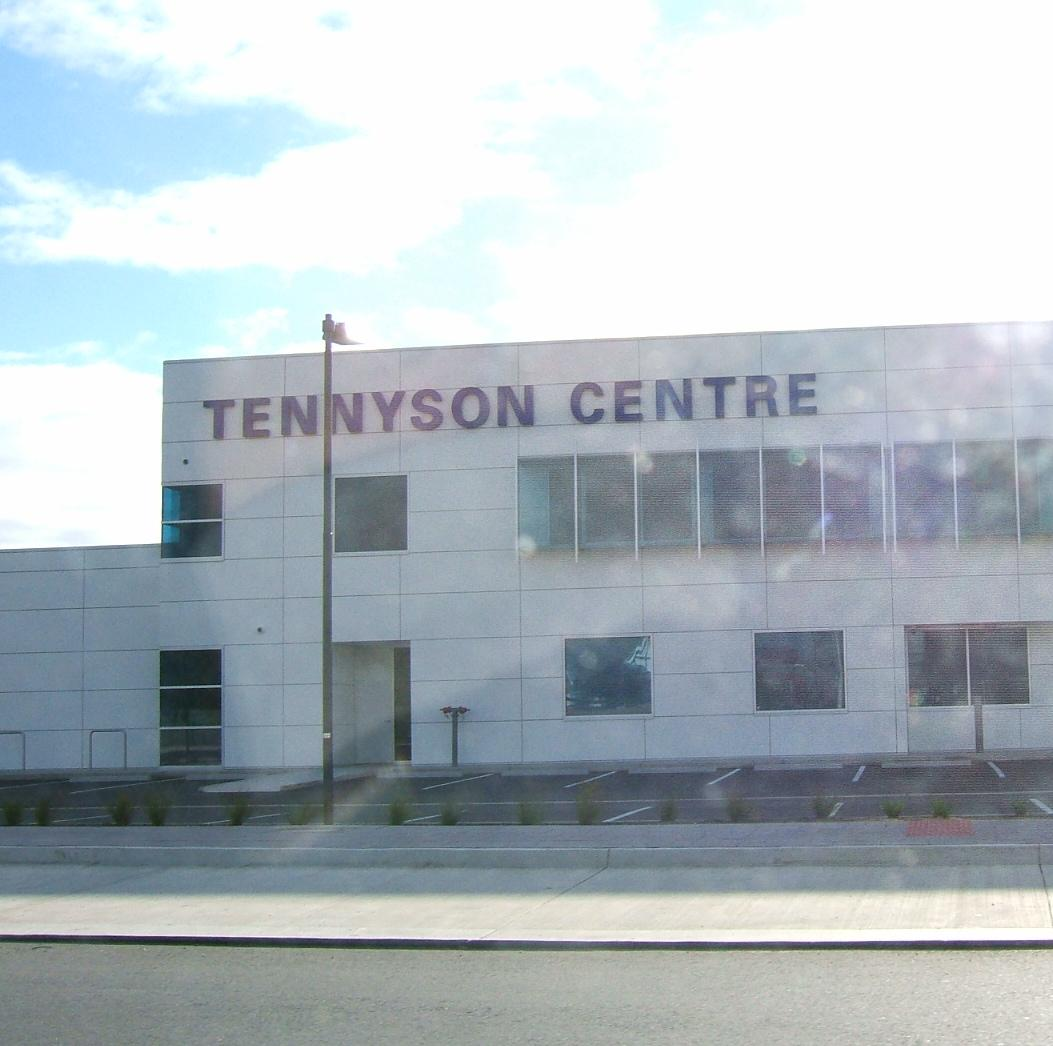
- Tennyson Centre in Kurralta Park

- Country: Australia
- State: South Australia
- City: Adelaide
- LGA: City of West Torrens

Government
  - State electorate: Badcoe
  - Federal division: Adelaide

Population
  - Total: 3,139 (SAL 2021)
- Postcode: 5037

Kurralta Park is a suburb of Adelaide, South Australia in the City of West Torrens. Landmarks include Kurralta Central shopping centre, Brown Hill Creek and the Westside Bikeway on a former railway line.

== History ==
Dr William Wyatt purchased an 80-acre section of land, south-west of Adelaide, which would become Kurralta Park, in 1837. Wyatt (an early Protector of Aborigines) made his home, "Kurralta", in Burnside. "Kurralta" is said to mean "set on a hill" in the Kaurna language.

== Geography ==
The area is bound by Anzac Highway to the south, South Road to the east, and Barwell Avenue to the north. Brownhill Creek divides the suburb. It is about 4 km from the CBD of Adelaide.

== Sir Thomas Playford ETSA Museum ==
The museum, at the corner of Broughton and Clifford Avenues, hosts an extensive display of electricity generation and transmission equipment, also vehicles and consumer products from the "glory days" of the Electricity Trust. It is maintained by volunteers who are ex-employees of the Trust, and is open on Tuesdays.
