= Urrbrae =

Urrbrae may refer to:

- Urrbrae, South Australia, a suburb of Adelaide
  - TAFE SA Urrbrae campus
  - Urrbrae Agricultural High School, actually in the neighbouring suburb of Netherby, South Australia
  - Urrbrae House, given by Peter Waite to the University of Adelaide
