= Electoral district of Waite =

South Australian state electoral district

Waite South Australia—House of Assembly
- Interactive map of electoral district boundaries from the 2022 state election (Note: The electorate will have no change in boundaries at the 2026 state election.)
- State: South Australia
- Created: 1993
- MP: Catherine Hutchesson
- Party: Labor
- Namesake: Peter Waite
- Electors: 27,160 (2018)
- Area: 75.4 km^{2} (29.1 sq mi)
- Demographic: Metropolitan
- Coordinates: 34°59′17″S 138°37′31″E
Electorates around Waite:
Unley	Unley	Bragg
Elder	Waite	Heysen
Davenport	Davenport	Heysen

Waite is a single-member electoral district for the South Australian House of Assembly. Named after Peter Waite, a 19th century entrepreneur and philanthropist, it covers 75.4 km² of suburbs and foothills in Adelaide's inner south-east, taking in the suburbs of Belair, Blackwood, Brown Hill Creek, Coromandel East, Coromandel Valley, Crafers West, Craigburn Farm, Eden Hills, Glenalta, Hawthorndene, Kingswood, Lynton, Mitcham, Netherby, Springfield, Torrens Park, Urrbrae as well as part of Upper Sturt.

Waite was created in the 1991 electoral distribution as a comfortably safe Liberal seat, replacing the abolished district of Mitcham, the only single-member lower house seat anywhere throughout Australia to be won by the Democrats. At the 1993 election, Mitcham's last member, Liberal deputy leader Stephen Baker, easily retained it amid that year's decisive Liberal victory. Baker served as Treasurer from 1993 to 1997. Upon his retirement at the 1997 election, he was succeeded by Martin Hamilton-Smith, who represented the seat as a member of the Liberal Party for 17 years holding several ministries and shadow ministries, and for a period was Leader of the Opposition. Two months after the 2014 election, Hamilton-Smith became an independent and held several ministries in the Weatherill Labor government. He retired at the 2018 election and was succeeded by Sam Duluk, the former Liberal member for Davenport. Sam Duluk resigned from the Liberal Party to sit as an independent in 2020 after allegations of inappropriate behaviour. Duluk was defeated at the 2022 election by Catherine Hutchesson, his Labor opponent in 2018, becoming the first Labor member in its history. Counting its time as Mitcham, the seat had been held by the Liberals (and their predecessors, the Liberal and Country League) or non-Labor independents since the introduction of single-member districts in 1938. Hutchesson picked up a massive swing at the 2026 election amid the Liberals' collapse in SA. Her majority swelled to 19.7 percent, on paper making Waite a very safe Labor seat in one stroke.

== Members for Waite ==
Member	Party	Term
Stephen Baker	Liberal	1993–1997
Martin Hamilton-Smith	Liberal	1997–2014
Martin Hamilton-Smith	Independent	2014–2018
Sam Duluk	Liberal	2018–2020
Sam Duluk	Independent	2020–2022
Catherine Hutchesson	Labor	2022–present

== Election results ==
2026 South Australian state election: Waite
Party	Candidate	Votes	%	±%
Labor	Catherine Hutchesson	12,742	49.3	+22.7
Liberal	Frank Pangallo	4,769	18.4	−7.4
Greens	Declan Brumfield	4,199	16.2	+4.8
One Nation	Aaron von Frattner	3,070	11.9	+11.9
Independent	Alec Gargett	751	2.9	+2.9
Australian Family	Ross Pawley	259	1.0	+1.0
Fair Go	Mark Ruta	61	0.2	+0.2
Total formal votes		25,851	97.6	±0.0
Informal votes		633	2.4	±0.0
Turnout		26,484	92.8	+0.2
Two-candidate-preferred result
Labor	Catherine Hutchesson	18,012	69.7	+15.7
Liberal	Frank Pangallo	7,839	30.3	−15.7
Labor hold		Swing	+15.7	
