= Underdale =

Underdale may refer to the following places:

- Underdale, Shrewsbury, Shropshire, England 52.718°N 2.739°W
- Underdale, South Australia, Australia 34°55′S 138°33′E
  - Underdale High School
- Kirby Underdale, North Yorkshire, England
