= UAHS =

UAHS may refer to:

- Ulster Architectural Heritage Society
- Upper Arlington High School, a high school named for and located in the Columbus, Ohio, suburb of Upper Arlington
- Urrbrae Agricultural High School, Netherby, South Australia, Australia
