= Hawthorn, South Australia =

Hawthorn
- Suburb
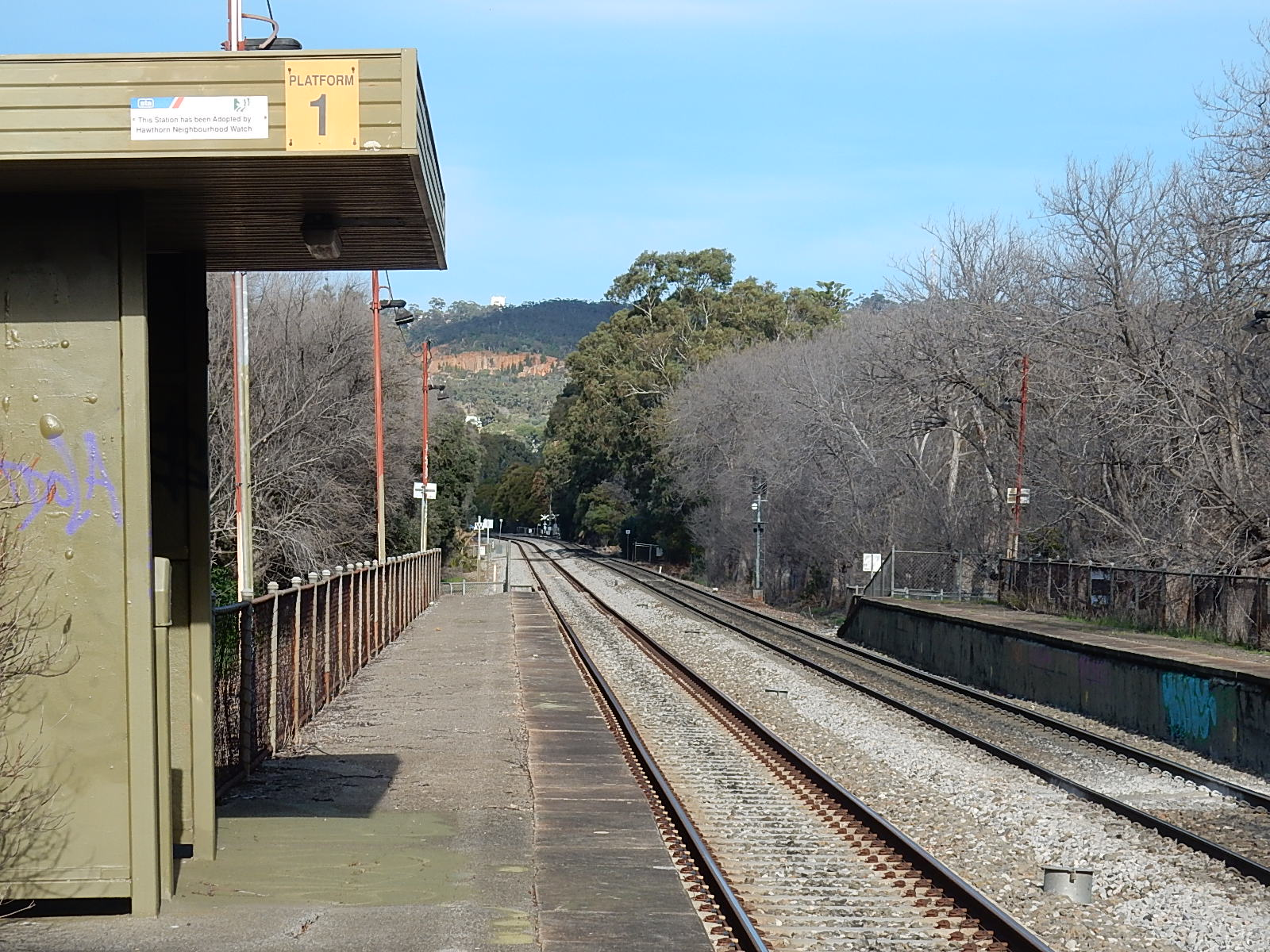
- Former Hawthorn railway station which ran through the suburb.

- Interactive map of Hawthorn
- Country: Australia
- State: South Australia
- City: Adelaide
- LGA: City of Mitcham

Government
  - State electorate: Elder
  - Federal division: Boothby

Population
  - Total: 2,221 (SAL 2021)
- Time zone: UTC+9:30 (ACST)
  - Summer (DST): UTC+10:30 (ACST)
- Postcode: 5062
Suburbs around Hawthorn
| Kings Park | Unley Park | Malvern |
| Westbourne Park | Hawthorn | Kingswood |
| Colonel Light Gardens | Lower Mitcham | Torrens Park |

Hawthorn is a suburb of Adelaide, South Australia, in the City of Mitcham. It is bounded to the north by Cross Road, to the south by Grange Road, to the west by Sussex Terrace and to the east by Belair Road. To the west is Westbourne Park, and to the east is Kingswood. Brown Hill Creek runs through the suburb.

Several parks are situated here, including the Mitcham Memorial Gardens and Price Memorial Oval, home of the Mitcham Hawks Football Club.

The closest primary school to the suburb is Mitcham Primary School and the nearest high schools are Unley High School and Mitcham Girls High School. Private schools such as Scotch College and Mercedes College are also close by.

The Belair line runs through the western side of the suburb. While Hawthorn formerly had its own stop on the line until 1995, the Unley Park railway station sits on the border of Hawthorn and Westbourne Park.

St Columba's Anglican Church, designed in Gothic style by noted local architect Alfred Wells and built in 1898, is at 101 Cross Road. Initially overseen by the parish of St Michael's in Mitcham, Hawthorn became a parish in its own right in 1921.
