= Kingswood Football Club =

Kingswood

Names
- Full name: Kingswood Football Club
- Former name(s): National Bank Amateur Football Club (1971-1983); National Australia Bank Group Football Club (1984-1990)
- Nickname: Bankers

Club details
- Founded: 1971
- Dissolved: 1991
- Colours: Blue, Red
- Former grounds: South Parklands (1971-1980)
- Kingswood Oval (1981-1991)

Kingswood Football Club was an Australian rules football club based at Kingswood, South Australia that folded following the 1991 South Australian Amateur Football League (SAAFL) season.

== History ==
The club was initially formed as a workplace club called the National Bank Amateur Football Club in 1971 and joined the South Australian Amateur Football League, with the first committee meeting held on 15 February 1971, and based at Park 19 (Pityarilla) in the South Parklands. The club relocated to Kingswood Oval in 1981 and adjusted its name to National Australia Bank Group Football Club in 1984. The club renamed itself to the Kingswood Football Club in 1991 to appeal to a wider market, but this name was short-lived as the club folded at the end of that season.

== A-Grade Premierships ==
- South Australian Amateur Football League A4 (1)
  - 1976
- South Australian Amateur Football League A5 (1)
  - 1975
- South Australian Amateur Football League A7 (1)
  - 1971
  - 1984
