= Hawthorn railway station, Adelaide =

Closed railway station in Adelaide, South Australia

Hawthorn
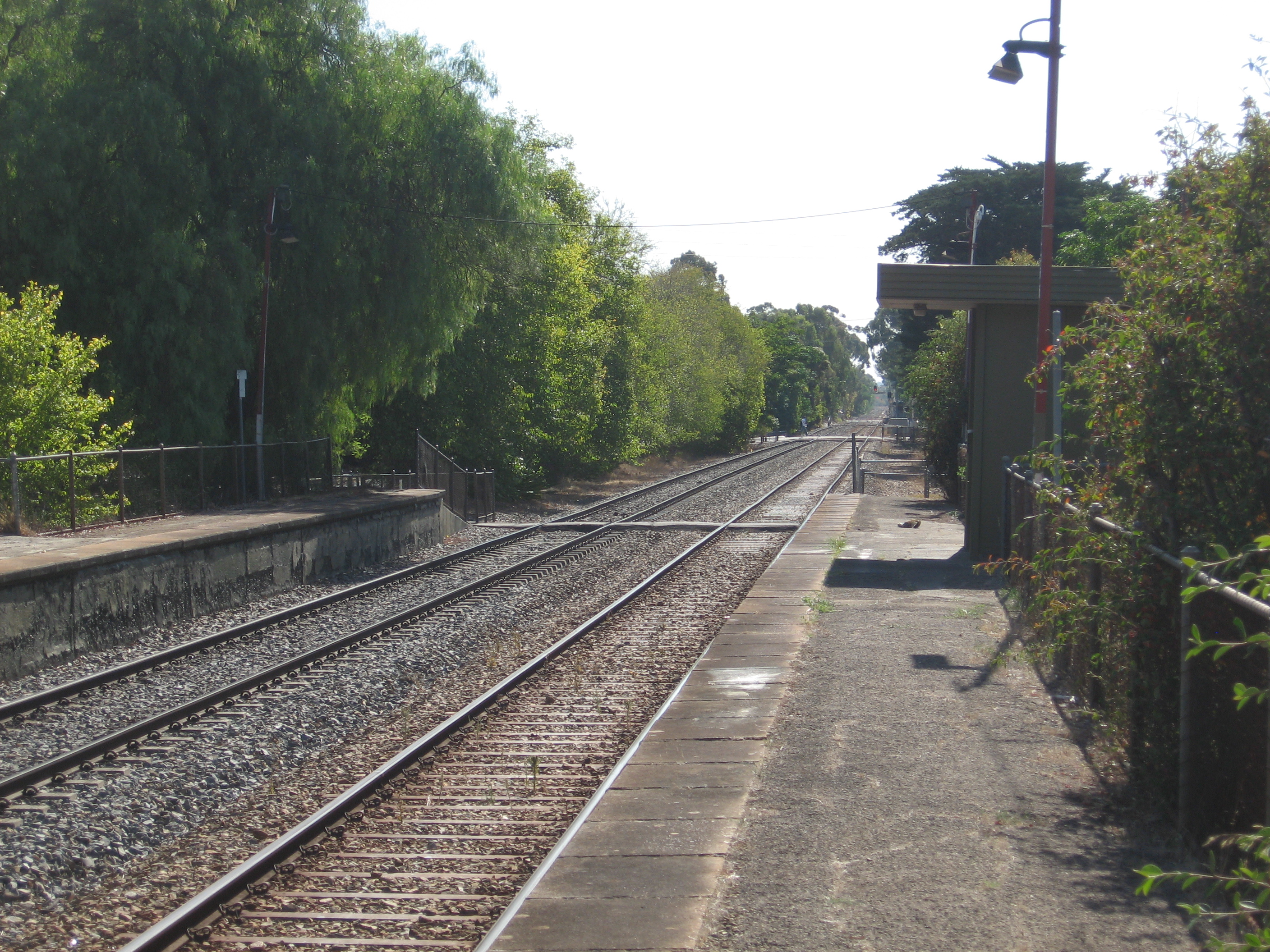

General information
- Location: Egmont Terrace; Hawthorn
- Coordinates: 34°58′12″S 138°36′04″E
- Line: Belair
- Distance: 7.5 km from Adelaide
- Platforms: 2
- Bus routes: n/a

Construction
- Parking: n/a
- Cycle facilities: n/a

Other information
- Status: Closed

History
- Opened: 1910s
- Closed: 28 April 1995
- Rebuilt: 1980s

Services
Preceding station	TransAdelaide	Following station
Unley Park towards Adelaide	Belair line	Mitcham towards Belair
Location

Hawthorn railway station was located on the Belair line, in the inner southern Adelaide suburb of Hawthorn, 7.5 kilometres from Adelaide railway station.

== History ==
Hawthorn was opened sometime in the 1910s. It runs parallel to Egmont Terrace, and is located 500 metres south of Unley Park station. It consists of two earth-filled concrete faced platforms, one each side of the dual lines, which were originally both broad gauge. Each platform had a timber and iron open passenger shelter, and there was a ticket office at the foot of the western platform which was staffed only at peak hours in the 1960s. These shelters were later replaced with bus stop style shelters and public address speakers were added.

It closed on 28 April 1995 along with Millswood and Clapham when the line was converted to two single lines as part of the standardisation of the Adelaide-Wolseley line. On Adelaide Metro rail network maps in most carriages, gaps on the Belair line map remain where the entries for Hawthorn and the other disused stations on the Belair line, have been removed. The shelters and public address speakers are no longer extant, but the platforms remain in situ.
