= Springfield, South Australia =

Springfield
- Suburb
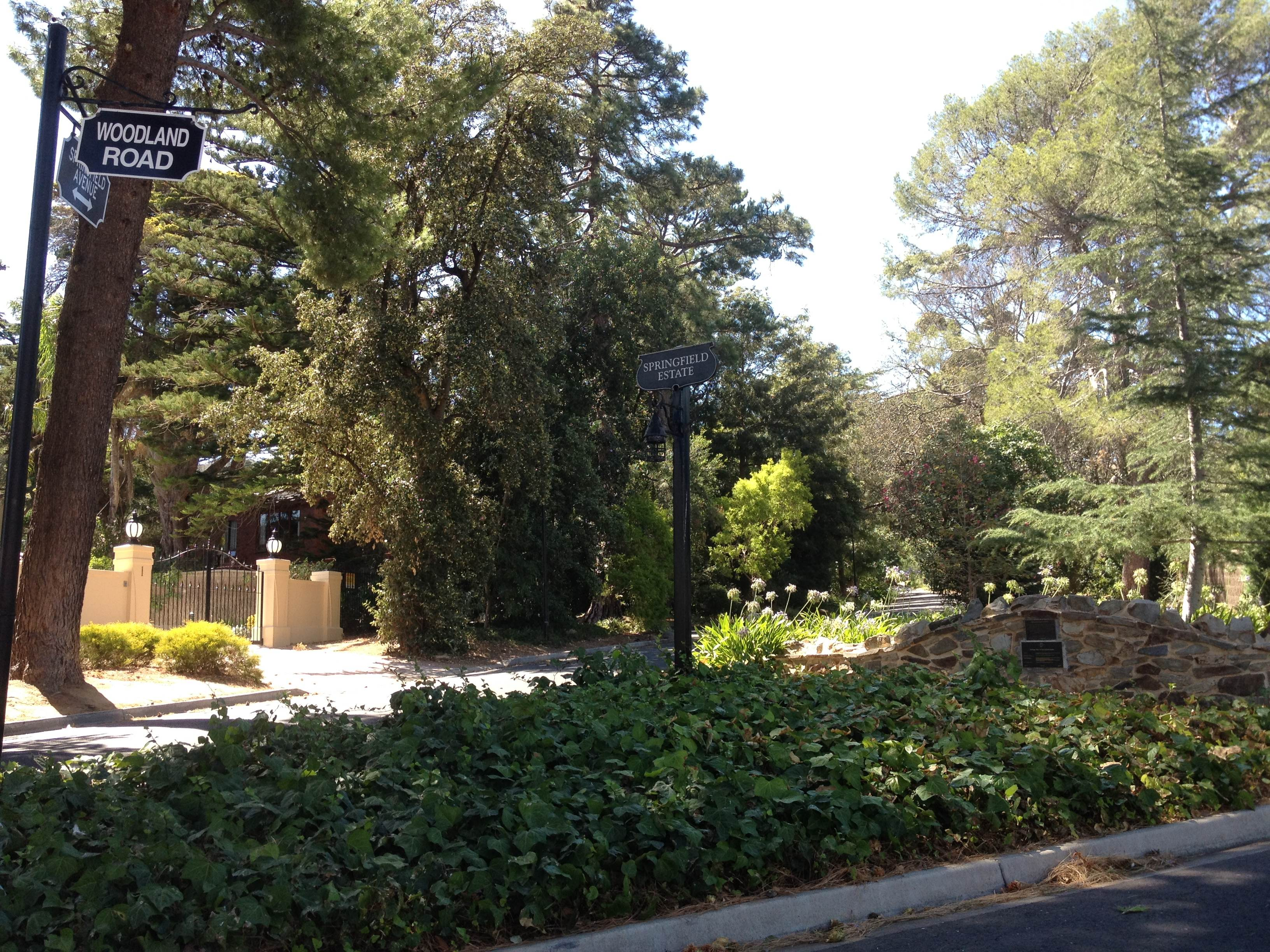

- Coordinates: 34°58′41″S 138°37′52″E
- Country: Australia
- State: South Australia
- City: Adelaide
- LGA: City of Mitcham

Government
  - State electorate: Waite
  - Federal division: Boothby

Population
  - Total: 548 (SAL 2021)
- Postcode: 5062
Suburbs around Springfield
Kingswood	Netherby	Urrbrae
Torrens Park	Springfield	Leawood Gardens
Torrens Park	Mitcham	Brown Hill Creek

Springfield is a green and hilly inner-southern suburb of the South Australian capital city of Adelaide. It is located in the foothills of the Mount Lofty Ranges, around 8 kilometres (5.0 mi) south-east of the Adelaide city centre. The suburb is part of the hills-face zone, with sweeping views over the Adelaide plains. Springfield is an affluent area containing many of South Australia's most valuable residential properties.

Springfield is bounded to the North by the suburbs of Kingswood and Netherby, to the west by Torrens Park and Mitcham, to the south by Mitcham and Brown Hill Creek, and to the east by Leawood Gardens and Urrbrae.

== History ==
Situated on the east side of the Mitcham district, the land was first purchased from the crown in 1841 by Richard F. Newland, manager of the Bank of Australasia. By 1870, Charles B. Hardy was making extensive additions to a residence named "Springfield", laying out extensive gardens and adding to the acreage of the estate. Fifty years ago, the area was purchased from Mr. Frank Rymill by Springfield Limited which boasted a subdivisional design "entirely different from any previous scheme or organised suburban development in South Australia".

== Demographics ==
In the 2006 Australian census; there were 541 people residing in Springfield, of which 255 were Male and 286 were Female. 59.8% of the population were either Professionals or Managers, working primarily in the Medical, Legal and Accounting sectors.

Residents were also relatively religious; citing the Anglican, Catholic and Uniting Churches of Western Christianity as their preferred choice of religion. In addition, 16.1% of residents identified themselves as having no religious affiliation.

== Attractions ==
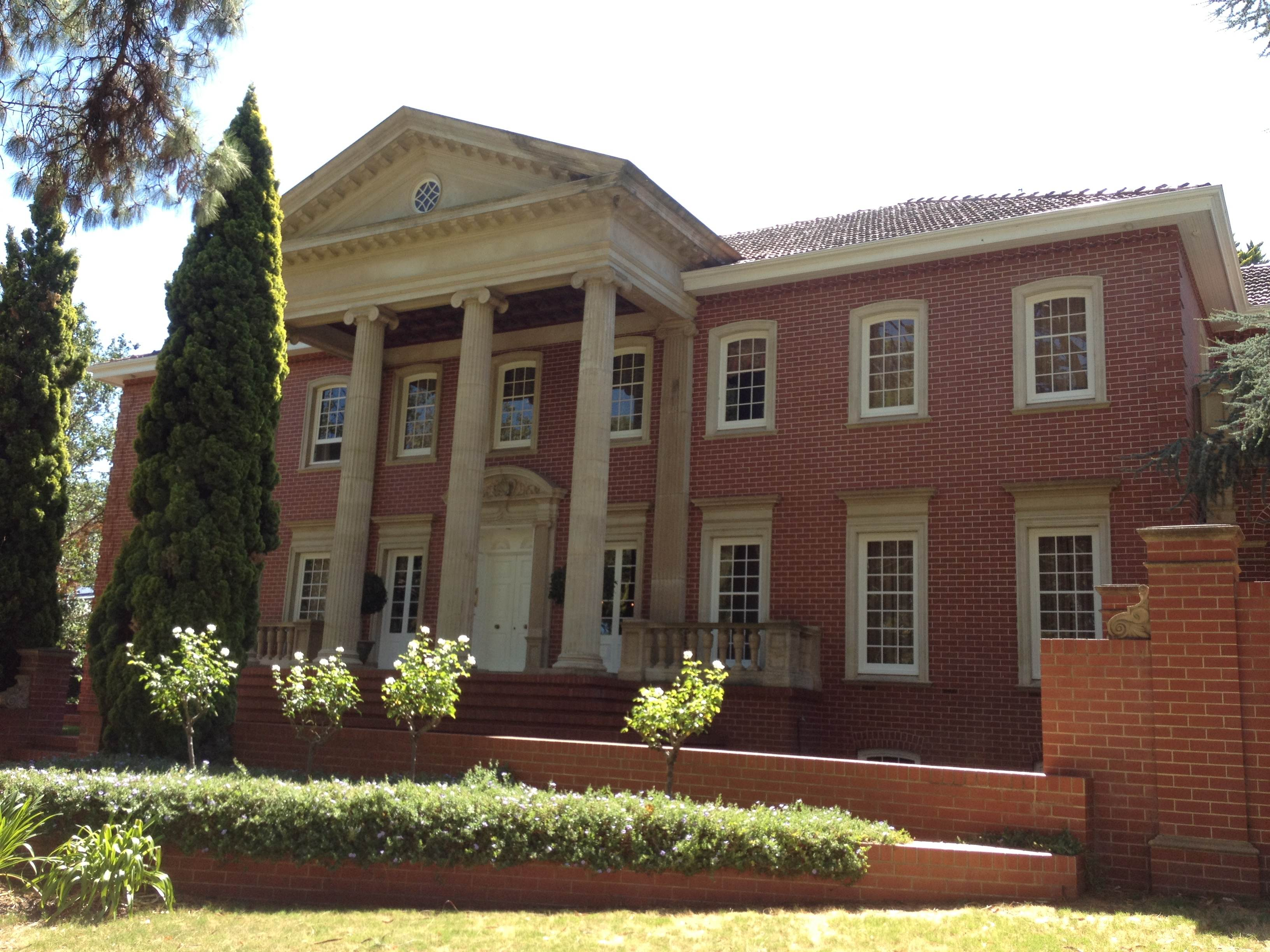
An opulent residential home in Springfield, typical of the suburb and designed in the Georgian Revival architectural style.

Carrick Hill is a property accessible to the public that was established in the 1930s by Bill Hayward and his wife, Lady Ursula.

== Governance ==
Springfield lies in the City of Mitcham, the State Electoral division of Waite and the Federal Division of Boothby.

== Education ==
Springfield is also home to Mercedes College Mercedes is a Catholic school. The rear portion of the University of Adelaide's agriculturally dominated Waite Campus.

Australian actor Peter O'Brien, who won the Silver Logie for "Most Popular Actor" in 1987 for his role as Shane Ramsay in the soap opera Neighbours, was a teacher at the school before turning to acting in the early 1980s.
