= Myrtle Bank, South Australia =

Myrtle Bank
- Suburb
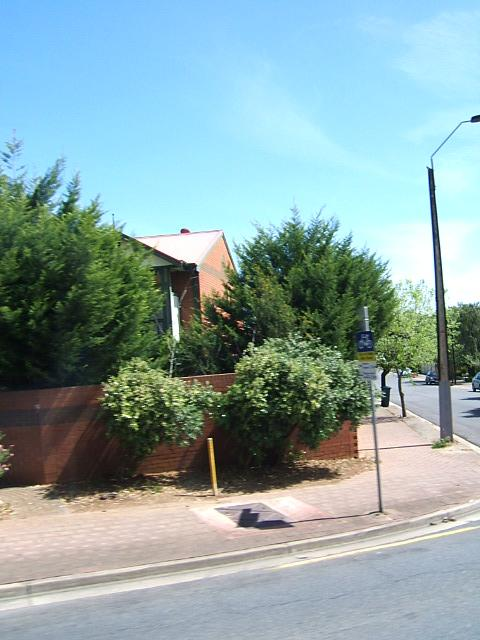
- Ferguson Avenue, Myrtle Bank

- Interactive map of Myrtle Bank
- Country: Australia
- State: South Australia
- City: Adelaide
- LGA: City of Unley
- Location: 6 km (3.7 mi) from Adelaide

Government
  - State electorate: Unley
  - Federal division: Sturt

Population
  - Total: 3,158 (SAL 2021)
- Postcode: 5064
Suburbs around Myrtle Bank
	Fullarton	Glenunga
Highgate	Myrtle Bank	Glen Osmond
Netherby	Urrbrae

Myrtle Bank is a suburb of Adelaide, South Australia in the City of Unley. The suburb is named after a property near the foothills built in 1842 by William Sanders (1801–1880), who arrived in South Australia in 1838. He named the premises 'Myrtle Bank', because his friend James Gall of Trinity living in Edinburgh had a fine property of the same name. The property passed through the hands of Capt. William Elder, brother of Sir Thomas Elder, before being purchased in 1848 by William Ferguson (1809–1892), who built on the original house and lived there with his family until he died. During World War I, the property became a repatriation hospital.

Politically, the suburb is very safe for the Liberal Party, and is located in the Division of Sturt. At the 2025 federal election landslide, the Liberals won just two of the 400+ metropolitan election-day booths across the seven Adelaide-based seats — Myrtle Bank in Sturt, and Unley Park in the Division of Adelaide.

== Notable people ==
- Gordon Campbell, cricketer
- William Ferguson, pioneer settler
- William Murray, gardener
- Greig Pickhaver, comedian and writer
