= Frank Pangallo =

Australian journalist and politician

The Honourable Frank Pangallo
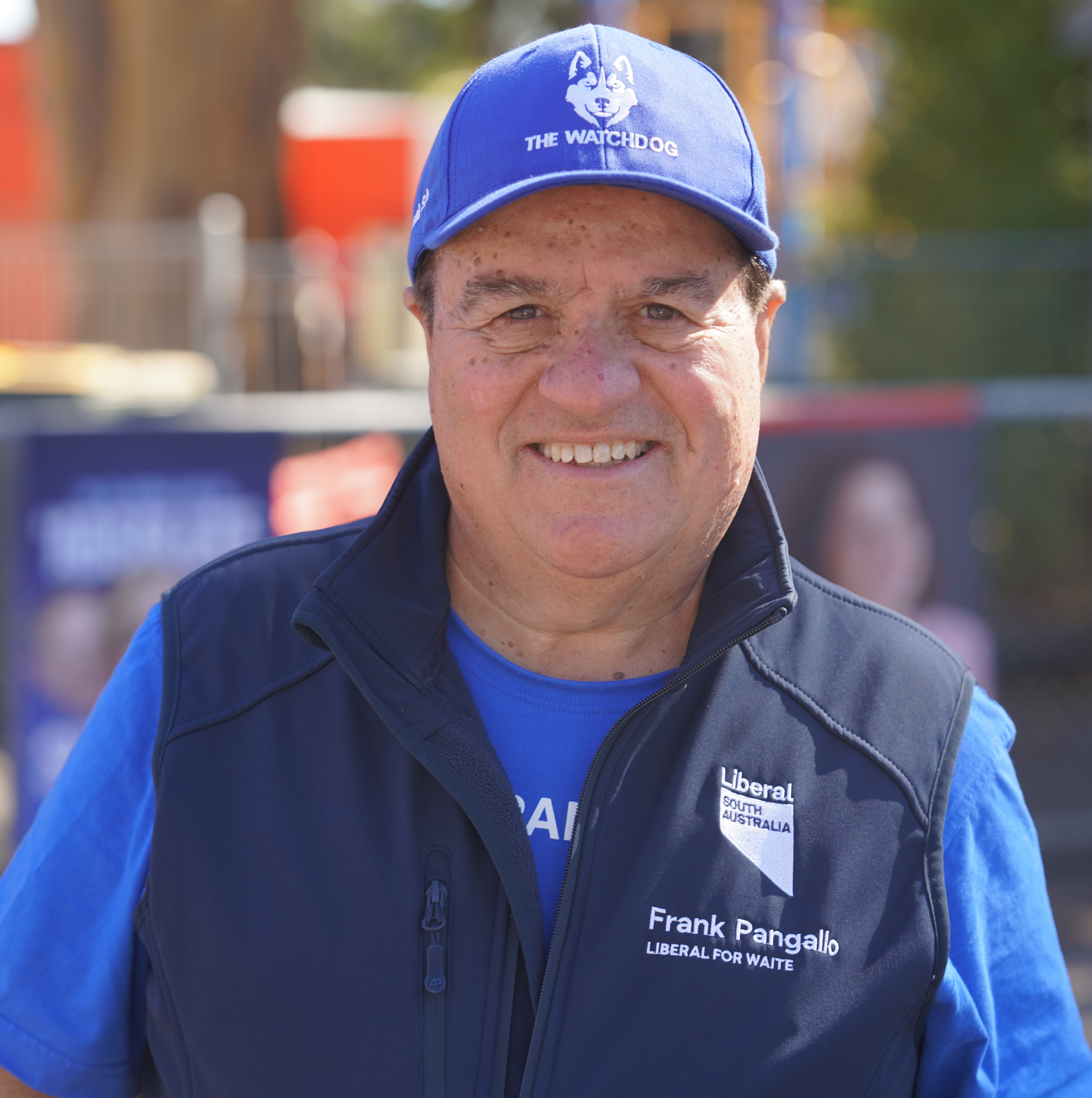
- Pangallo in 2026

Member of the South Australian Legislative Council
- In office 17 March 2018 – 20 March 2026

Personal details
- Born: 15 October 1954 (age 72) Mile End, South Australia, Australia
- Party: Liberal (2025–present)
- Other political affiliations: Independent (2023–2025); SA Best (2018–2023)
- Spouse: Angela Pangallo
- Education: Underdale High School (South Australia)
- Occupation: Politician; journalist

Frank Pangallo (born 15 October 1954) is an Australian politician and journalist. Beginning his career as a journalist and television reporter, Pangallo became a media advisor to Nick Xenophon in 2017, and was elected to an eight-year term in the South Australian Legislative Council in 2018 as a member of Xenophon's SA Best party. Pangallo left SA Best to sit as an independent in 2023, and joined the Liberal Party in 2025 to stand as their candidate in Waite for the 2026 state election. He failed to win the seat of Waite, only receiving 18.5% of first preferences votes.

== Early life and education ==
Pangallo was born on 15 October 1954 at Mile End Hospital. Pangallo's Italian immigrant parents, Giuseppe and Maria, moved from southern Italy to South Australia two years before he was born. Pangallo is the third of five children.

Pangallo attended a number of primary schools in Thebarton, including the Sisters of St Joseph Convent, Marist Brothers, and Thebarton Primary School. He attended secondary education at Underdale High School up to Year 11, dropping out halfway through an attempt at repeating Year 12. As a student at Underdale High School, Pangallo had an enthusiasm for sport and was a member of the school's senior soccer team.

== Career ==
=== Media ===
Pangallo started his career as a copyboy at The News in 1972, with an aim of becoming a sports journalist. He was promoted to a cadetship after a year's work at The News, and was sent to report in Melbourne for the paper in 1973, working at The Herald and Weekly Times. During the mid-1980s, Pangallo worked as a chief reporter and chief of staff at The News.

In 1978, Pangallo joined the radio station 5DN as a sportscaster. He also commentated National Soccer League matches for 5DN and 5RPH until 2001.

He was also part of the commentary team for the Australian Formula One Grands Prix from 1986 to 1995.

From 1981 to 1985, Pangallo was the Executive Producer for Jeremy Cordeaux's 5DN talkback programme.

From 1986 to 1989, Pangallo worked for SAS-10 and SAS-7 as the newsroom Chief of Staff.

Pangallo left a job at Channel Seven to become the editor-in-chief of The News in 1989. He resigned from The News in 1991, taking a role in television at the ABC's The 7.30 Report. Pangallo would later join ADS-10 as a Features Producer for Ten Eyewitness News.

In 1994, Pangallo moved to Sydney, where he became the Supervising Producer for Seven Network's national current affairs programme Real Life— a forerunner to Today Tonight. In 1995, he became the Supervising Producer for Today Tonight, returning to Adelaide later that lear as the State Supervising Producer and Senior Journalist.

In 2002, Pangallo was appointed Queensland State Producer for Today Tonight and NSW State Producer from 2003–2005.

In 2005, Pangallo returned to South Australia as Supervising Producer and Senior Investigative Journalist for Today Tonight until he retired from journalism in July 2017. Later that year, Pangallo became a media advisor to Nick Xenophon.

=== Politics ===
Pangallo was placed second on SA Best's ticket for the Legislative Council at the 2018 South Australian state election. At the 2018 election, Pangallo was successfully elected to the Legislative Council, becoming one of SA Best's two parliamentarians, alongside Connie Bonaros.

As a member of the Legislative Council, Pangallo introduced a bill in 2021 to limit the powers of South Australia's Independent Commission Against Corruption, removing its ability to investigate misconduct or maladministration. Pangallo's bill was passed unanimously.

Pangallo left SA Best in December 2023, citing ideological disputes with SA Best's other MLC, Connie Bonaros. The Advertiser reported that this stemmed over a dispute over a merger proposal for the University of South Australia and the University of Adelaide. Bonaros supported the proposal, while Pangallo wished for more time to consider it.

Pangallo proposed a parliamentary inquiry into gender dysphoria in February 2024, which he described as a "social contagion". This motion was not brought forward to a vote after the Labor Party decided against allowing its members a conscience vote on the issue, a decision supported by Labor Premier Peter Malinauskas.

Pangallo proposed legislation in October 2024 to place a number of regulations on the betting industry, with betting companies prevented from banning or limiting bettors based solely due to betting success, and being required to provide written reasons for banning or limiting bettors.

In August 2025, Pangallo joined the South Australian Liberal Party, being announced as the Liberal candidate for Waite in the 2026 South Australian state election.

Pangallo provided a list of four sources to a parliamentary committee in August 2025. The sources were claimed to support his position on a correlation between desalination plants and harmful algal blooms. Pangallo later stated that he had used generative AI to prepare the citations, which produced an incorrect list of sources.

== Personal life ==
Pangallo is married to Angela Pangallo and has three children. Angela Pangallo established the Gold Foundation in 2007 to support children with Asperger syndrome, and as of 2017 Pangallo served on the board of the Gold Foundation. Angela Pangallo was awarded an OAM in 2022 for service to people with neuro-developmental disorders.

Pangallo announced in May 2024 that he had stage 4 prostate cancer, being initially diagnosed in December 2023 and undergoing radiation treatment as a result.

== Honours and awards ==
- Archbishop of Adelaide Media Citation (1998)
- Various SA Press Club Awards (2010, 2014 and 2015).
- SA Press Club Gold Award for Journalist of the Year (2012).
