= Millswood railway station =

Railway station in Adelaide, South Australia

Millswood
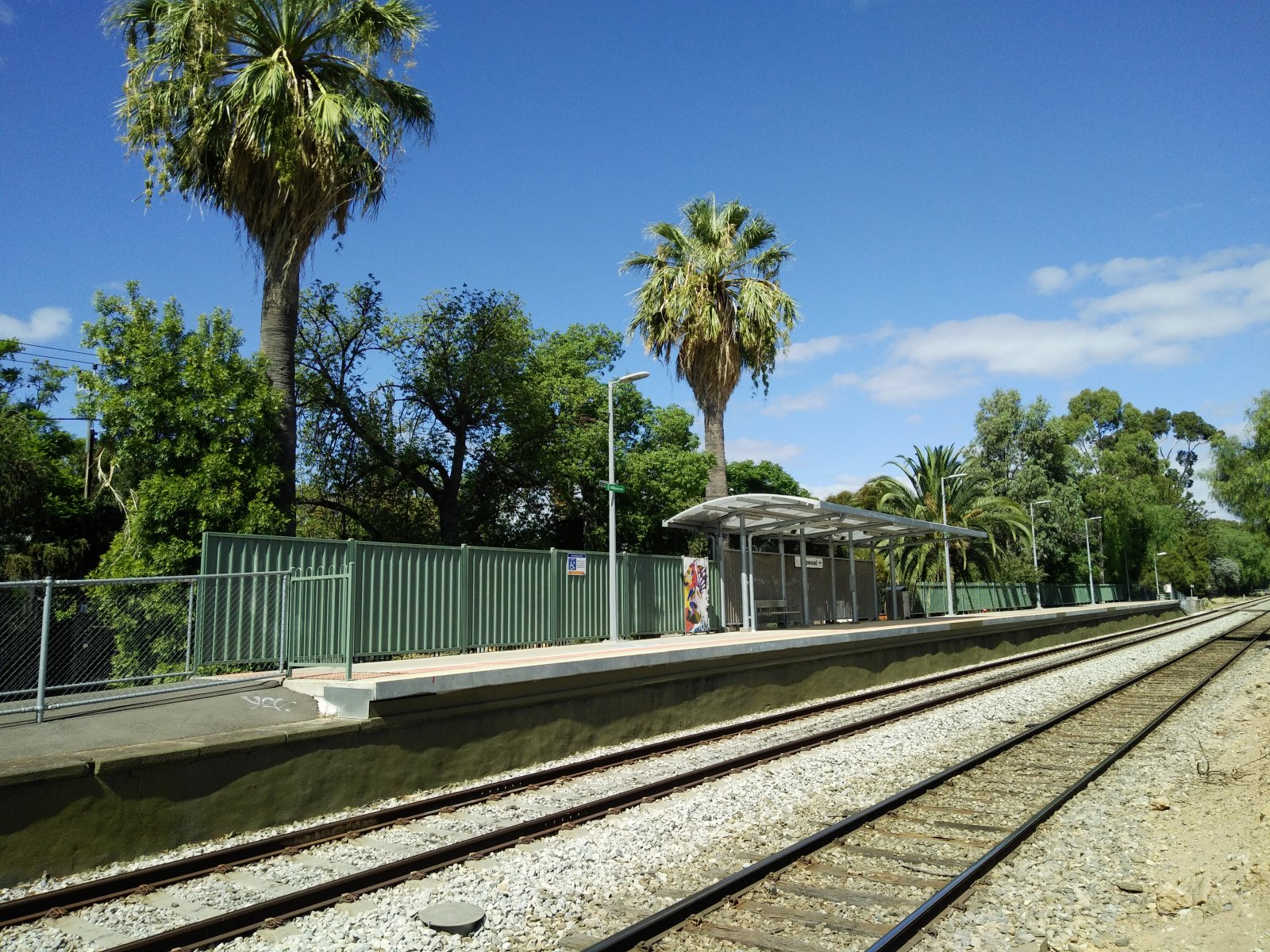
- Southbound view of the station platform, March 2018

General information
- Location: 251 Goodwood Rd; Kings Park SA 5034
- Coordinates: 34°57′32″S 138°35′26″E
- Owner: Department for Infrastructure & Transport
- Operator: Adelaide Metro
- Line: Belair
- Distance: 5.9 kilometres (3.7 mi) from Adelaide
- Platforms: 1 Side platform
- Tracks: 2 (1 broad gauge, 1 standard gauge)
- Connections: Bus

Construction
- Structure type: Ground
- Parking: No
- Cycle facilities: No
- Accessible: Yes

Other information
- Station code: 18719 (to City); 18720 (to Belair)
- Website: Adelaide Metro

History
- Opened: 1910s
- Closed: 28 April 1995
- Rebuilt: 12 October 2014

Services
Preceding station	Adelaide Metro	Following station
Goodwood towards Adelaide	Belair line	Unley Park towards Belair
Location

Millswood railway station is located on the Belair line in Adelaide. Situated in the Adelaide suburb of Millswood, it is 5.9 kilometres (3.7 mi) from Adelaide station.

== History ==
The station opened circa 1910. The platforms were constructed of earth-filled concrete each side of the dual tracks, which were both broad gauge until 1995. There were timber framed, iron clad open passenger shelters on each platform. The two outbound Unley Park and Hawthorn stations had similar shelters. A ticket office was provided on the Up (western) platform until being demolished in 1985, and the original shelters were removed in March 1988 and replaced with the bus stop type shelters seen at some stations on the TransAdelaide network.

Millswood station closed on 28 April 1995, simultaneously with stations at Clapham and Hawthorn despite criticism from nearby residents, with the conversion of the Adelaide-Wolseley line to standard gauge under the One Nation programme. A number of reasons were quoted as justification for the closures, including poor patronage, the excessive number of stations between Goodwood and Lynton and their proximity to each other, and the impracticability of a single-line working with so many stations and so few crossing points. The western platform was later demolished in 2007.

=== Reopening ===
In August 2013, moves were made towards the reopening of Millswood station, with the Transport Department launching an investigation into the proposal. In the leadup to the 2014 state election, the Labor State Government promised to reopen the station for a 12-month trial from 1 July 2014 if it was returned. Upgrade works at the station subsequently commenced in July 2014 at a cost of $500,000, but the initial draft timetable for the station only included every second peak-hour train not stopping at the reopened platform. The station reopened on 12 October 2014 for a 12-month trial. The trial was deemed successful, and the station was reopened permanently.

== Services by platform ==
Platform	Destination/s
1	Adelaide/Belair

== Transport links ==
Bus transfers: Stop 7 (Goodwood Road)
Route no.	Destination & route details
G10	Blair Athol – City – Flinders University – Westfield Marion
G20	City – Flinders Medical Centre – Aberfoyle Park
G21	City – Flinders Medical Centre – Aberfoyle Park
G30F	City – Bedford Park – Blackwood
N10	Westfield Marion – Flinders Medical Centre – City
N21	City – Westfield Marion – Aberfoyle Park

== Gallery ==
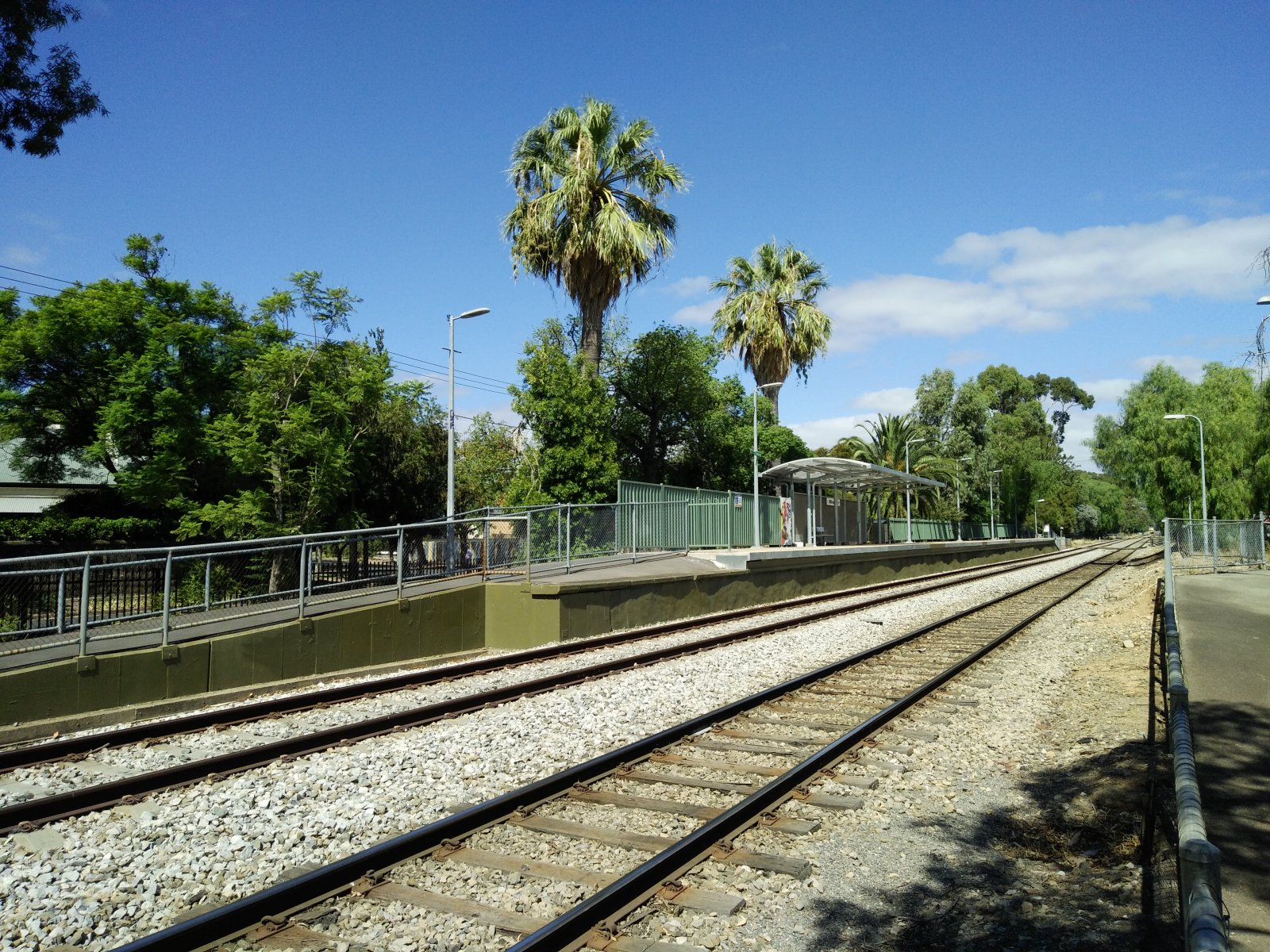
Southbound platform - looking south,
March 2018

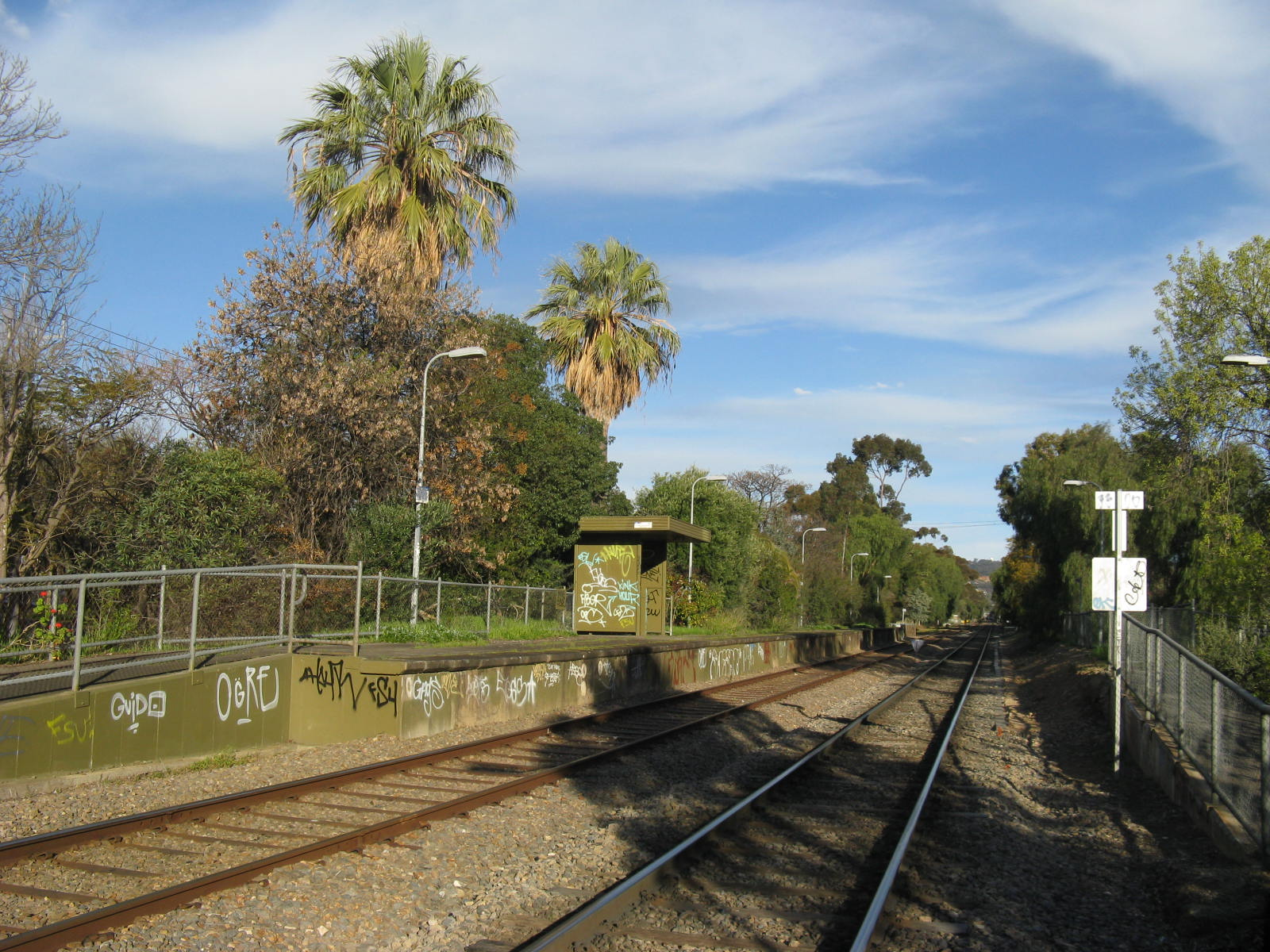
Southbound platform - looking south,
August 2008

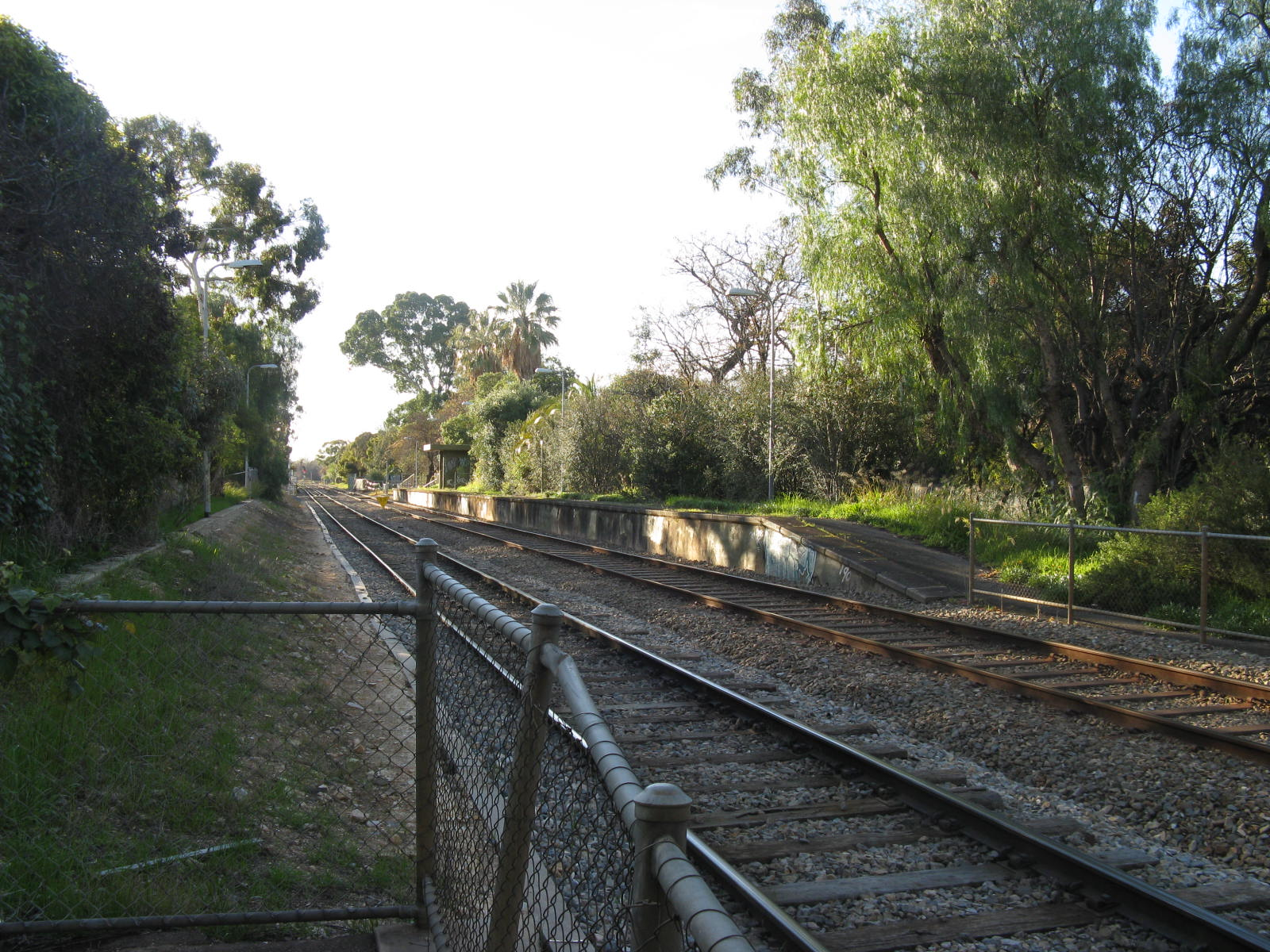
Southbound platform - looking north,
August 2008

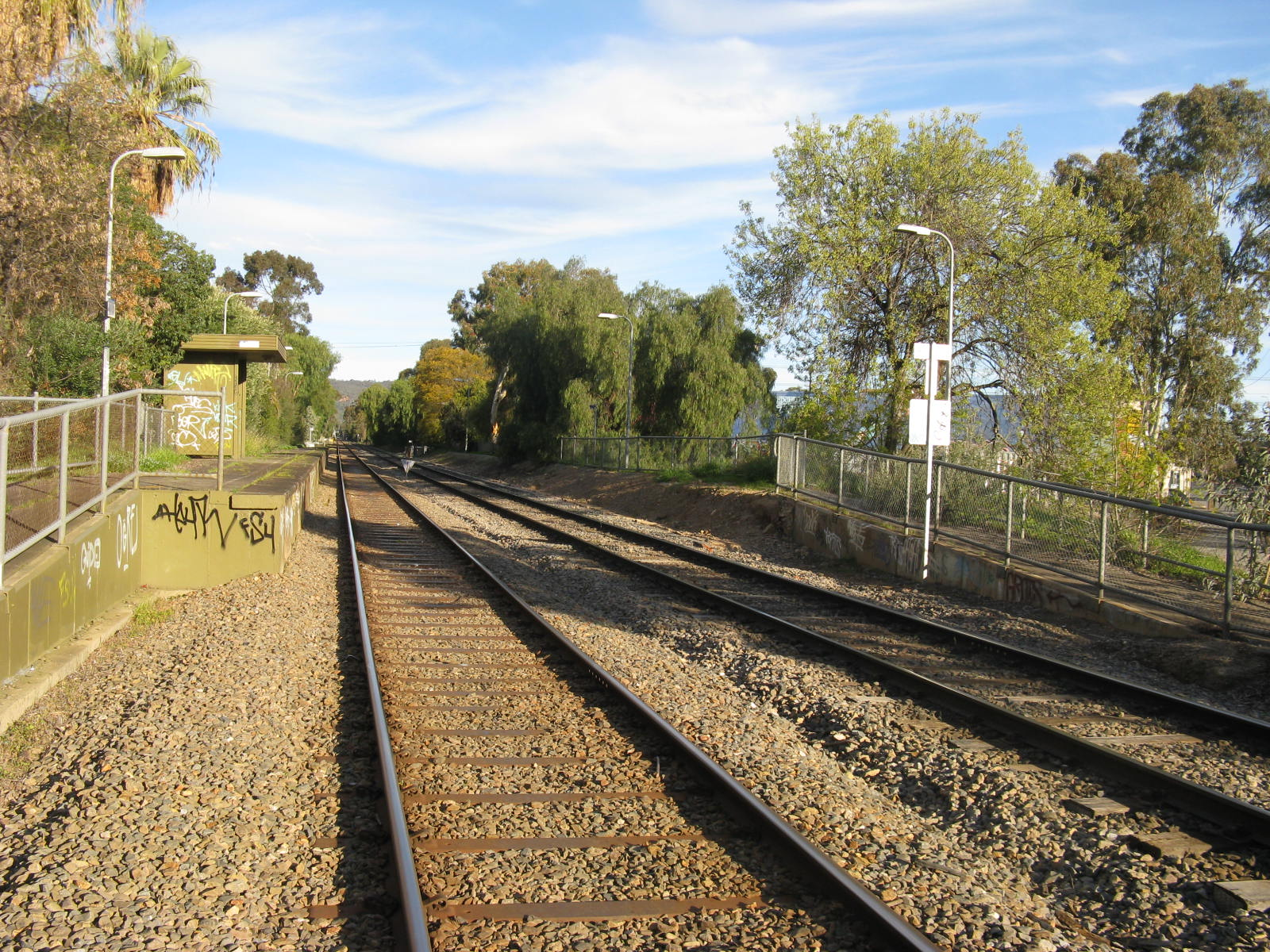
Looking south,
August 2008

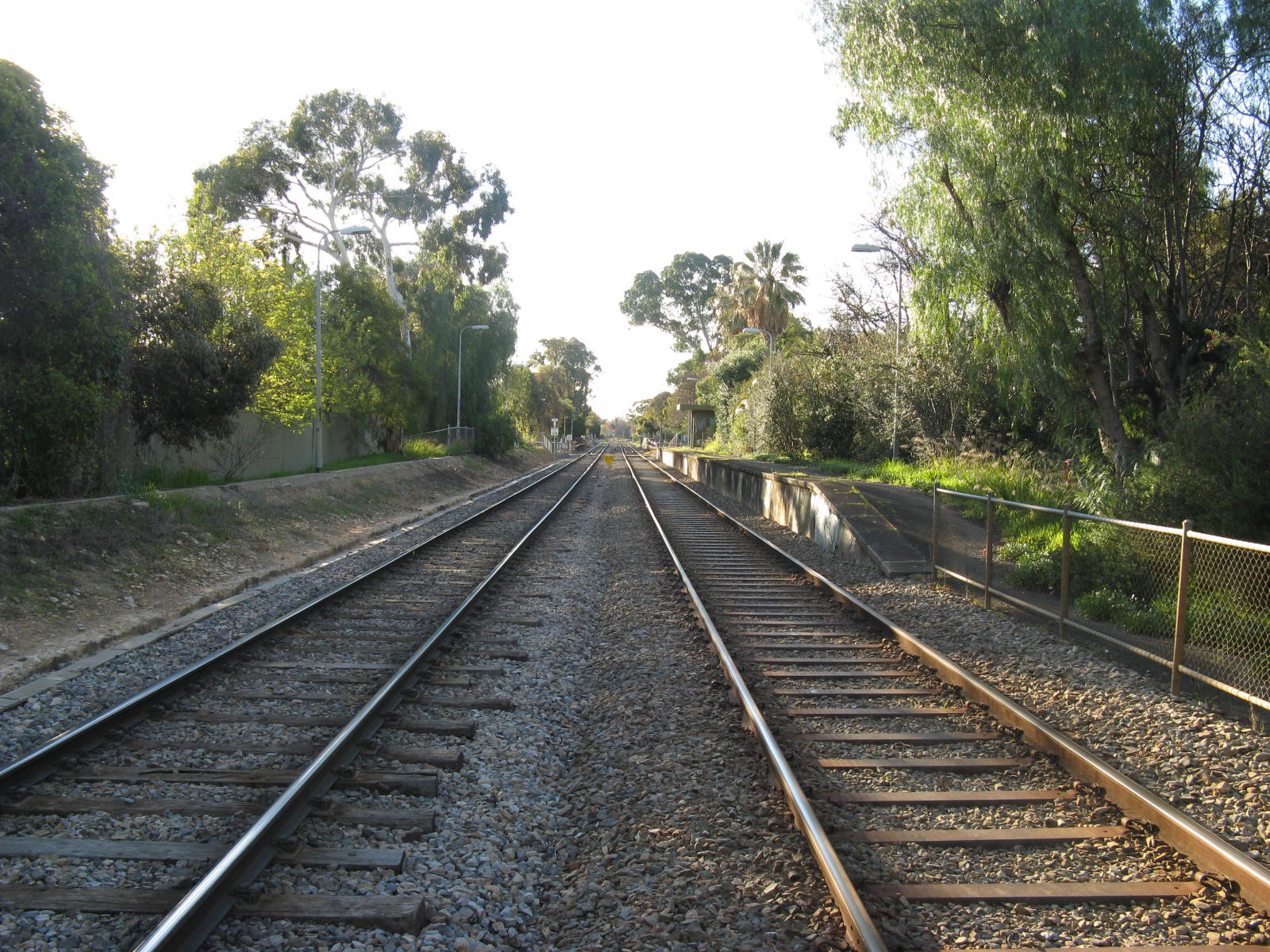
Looking north,
August 2008

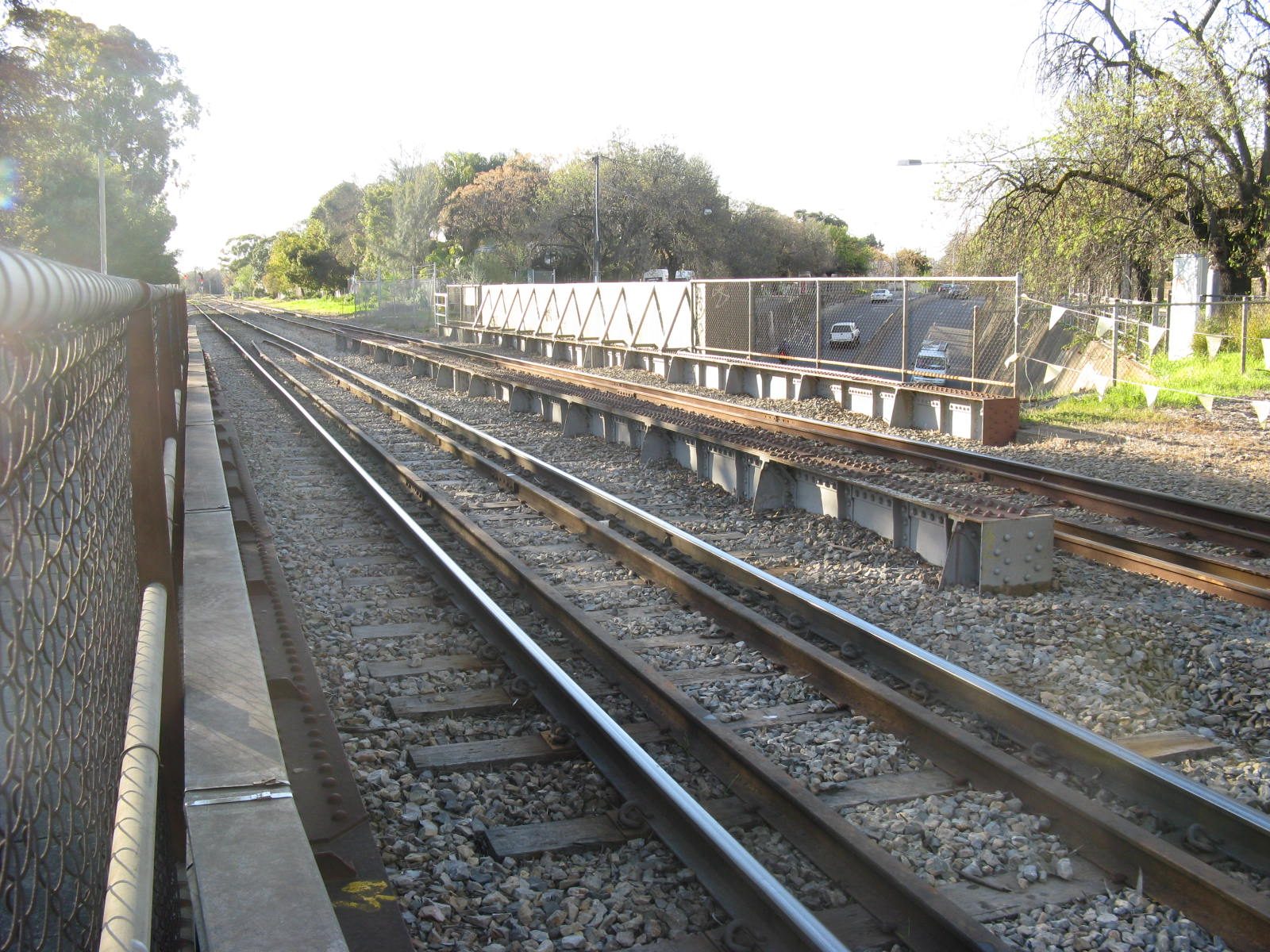
Goodwood Road underpass - northbound, August 2008
