= Jenni Hogan =

Two-time NCAA National Champion athlete, entrepreneur, TV host, and journalist

- Born: 23 August; Adelaide, South Australia
- Education: University of Washington
- Occupations: Athlete, Journalist, Entrepreneur
- Website: www.jennihogan.com

Jennifer Hogan, born Jennifer Vesnaver on 23 August in Adelaide, South Australia, is a 2 x NCAA National Champion athlete, entrepreneur, TV host and journalist. She has received an Emmy Award for her work and Forbes calls Hogan the "Socially Savvy TV Journalist" with the most online followers of any local TV anchor in the nation on Twitter and Facebook combined.

== Biography ==
Vesnaver was born in Adelaide, South Australia, where she graduated from Underdale High School. Initially, Vesnaver started out at the University of Adelaide majoring in Finance. However, in 1997, she came to Seattle, Washington with the Australian National Rowing Team to race in the Windermere Cup and two years later, was offered a rowing scholarship at the University of Washington where she was captain of the Husky Women's Crew Team; winning two national championships. Jenni Hogan graduated in 2002 from UW in Economics and Communications. She has been actively involved with her alma mater, serving on the UW's Department of Communication alumni board of directors and leading its mentorship program from 2009 to 2011.

== Career ==
After graduating from the University of Washington, Vesnaver became the first female sports director at KLEW 3 in Lewiston, Idaho. From there, she worked as a traffic reporter at KOIN 6 in Portland, Oregon and KOMO 4 in Seattle.

Vesnaver became the morning traffic anchor on KIRO-TV in fall of 2008. In March 2012 she helped create Social7 with Jenni Hogan, a live one-hour interactive show hosted by Vesnaver. The show has so much online interaction from viewers that its hashtag trends nationwide while live on TV. She also hosts the Hydroplane races every Summer during Seafair as a pit reporter and in 2012 was promoted to be the social media anchor for the 8-hour live broadcast on KIRO-TV.

In 2011 Vesnaver was the play-by-play announcer for the Windermere Cup broadcast by Root Sports.

In February 2013, she joined KING-TV as host of a news segment titled "Connect with Jenni Venaver".

In August 2013, Vesnaver designed and released the TVinteract app, to help on-air talent connect with viewers during a newscast using social media.

In March 2014, Hashtag aggregator Tagboard hired Vesnaver as their Chief Media Officer and acquired her TVinteract app. She was shortly after named Co-Founder of Tagboard along with Chief Operating Officer.

On April 14, 2014, Vesnaver stood in for comedian/newswoman Jodi Brothers on the Seattle radio station KJR-FM's morning program The Bob Rivers Show with Bob, Spike and Joe, while Brothers was on vacation.

In January 2018 she left Tagboard where she was Chief Operating Officer and Co-Founder and joined Universal Tennis as Chief Marketing Officer. She is still an investor in Tagboard.

== Community involvement and awards ==
In June 2012 Vesnaver won an Emmy in the category of “Interactivity” as Host/Producer of a 3-hour interactive livestream event called “The KIRO 7 Mobile Tweetup with Jenni Vesnaver”. In December 2010 Vesnaver came up with the concept of the mobile tweetup which mixes traditional TV with the online voice to benefit local causes. The concept is based on the concept of a tweetup which is a meetup for online friends. Instead of asking people to come to her, Hogan teamed up with KIRO-TV. KIRO-TV and Brotherton Cadillac to drive around to her Twitter and Facebook supporters and collect donations for a cause which led to the name "mobile". These mobile tweetups have raised more than 75,000 items for babies, thousands of dollars for cancer research, and 6 truckloads of toys for kids benefiting Toys for Tots.

In March 2010, Hogan flew to NY as a finalist in the journalist category for the Shorty Awards for Twitter. She teamed up with Bravado designs to donate one maternity bra per vote she received. They ended up donating more than 2,000 maternity bras to Within Reach to hand out to mothers in need in Washington State Washington (state).

She served on the University of Washington's Department of Communication alumni board of directors leading its mentoring program from 2009 to 2011.

== Other ventures ==
Hogan is Co-Founder of the GoGirl Academy. GoGirl Academy (GGA) is a career advancement program for women who seek a competitive edge in the workplace. In 2011 GoGirl Academy expanded to corporate training and added additional courses for men in the workplace changing its name to The SpringBoard Academy while still offering the GoGirl Advantage course.

== Personal life ==
Hogan (formerly Vesnaver) is divorced from Josh Hogan and she lives in Utah, as of 2021. In 2010, she gave birth to her daughter, Siena. Six years later in 2016 she gave birth to a son, Cameron.
