= William Ferguson (Australian pioneer) =

William Ferguson (c. 1809 – 3 December 1892) was a pioneer settler of South Australia, one of the last surviving emigrants on HMS Buffalo in 1836.

== History ==
Ferguson was a farmer born in Hawick, Scotland, and emigrated in 1836 on what has been termed the "First Fleet of South Australia" on Governor Hindmarsh's flagship Buffalo. His wife, who was pregnant when they embarked, gave birth to their first child on board the Buffalo in South Australian waters.

Ferguson was present at the Proclamation ceremony by the Old Gum Tree on 28 December 1836, and helped thatch the roof of the original Government House.

Ferguson purchased two "city acres" in a block stretching between Hindley and Currie Streets, the eastern boundary of which later became a thoroughfare, named Rosina Street after Mrs. Ferguson. He also purchased an acre on Rundle Street where Adelaide Arcade now stands, and another, on which the Primrose Brewery later stood. He also owned property at Magill (or Makgill as it was once spelled). It was there he grew one of the colony's first wheat crops, before selling it to Dr. C. R. Penfold. He also purchased a 248 acres (100 ha) part of section 251, Hundred of Adelaide, which he named "Roseville", again for his wife, and they lived there for around ten years. "Roseville" became the suburb Highgate.

Ferguson later purchased Section 267 at Glen Osmond. This property was first owned by Capt. Berkeley, who sold it to William Sanders, who built a house and named it "Myrtle Bank", then sold to Capt. William Elder, brother of Sir Thomas Elder. Ferguson purchased the property from Elder in 1848 and lived there until he died. That property is now the suburb Myrtle Bank.

Apart from his farming and land speculation activities, Ferguson was a partner with Robert Cock, for whom Cox Creek was (mis)named, as auctioneers.

Ferguson was a founder of the Agricultural and Horticultural Society, and an active supporter, both as an exhibitor and judge, later accorded life membership of the Society.

He was a strong adherent of Chalmers Church.

== Family ==
William Ferguson (c. 1809 – 3 December 1892) married Rosina Forsyth (c. 1810 – 15 December 1893) on 22 December 1835. Their children included:

- Isabella Ferguson (1836 – ) married James Ferguson on 27 March 1862. Isabella, who may have had a second name Maisie or Mayzie, was born aboard the Buffalo shortly after arrival in South Australia. James was son of William Ferguson of Glasgow, and not closely related. Other reports have him a son of Daniel Ferguson (1796–1864) of Glenunga.
- Rachael Christina Ferguson (1840 – 13 May 1921) married Andrew Tennant MP (20 June 1835 – 1913) on 28 August 1862, lived at Tallala Station near Port Lincoln, "Essenside", Glenelg. Andrew was also born in Hawick, Scotland. Their children were:

- John Tennant (28 October 1863 – 26 May 1941) married (cousin?) Margaret Barr Love ( – 19 May 1954) on 10 August 1898

- Andrew Tennant ( – ) married Gwendoline Letitia "Gwen" Goodman ( – ) on 11 October 1928. Gwen was a daughter of Sir William Goodman

- Rosina Forsayth "Rosie" Tennant (c. 1867 – 1939) married cousin William Tennant Mortlock (1858–1913) on 28 January 1891. He was son of Margaret Tennant and William Ranson Mortlock, see above
- William Andrew Tennant (1868 – 20 February 1929) married Elizabeth Mary Meincke (1900) and Matilda Elsie Audacia Hobbs née Polkinghorne (1925)
- Jessie Clara Tennant (30 August 1872 – 1958) married William Anstruther-Thomson (1860– ) on 28 January 1891. He was ADC to the Governor.
- Frederick Augustus "Fred" Tennant (22 July 1874 – 1937) married Kathleen Hammill ( –1964) on 28 October 1914
- Adelaide Tennant (22 July 1874 – 8 April 1952) married Richard McDonnell Hawker ( –1930), son of G. C. Hawker, on 25 February 1903

- Margaret Jane Ferguson (c. 1842 – 14 May 1932) married William Bickford (19 November 1841 – 20 September 1916) in 1871, lived at Glenelg. Their family included:

- Sidney Bickford (10 August 1874 – 10 December 1938)
- Harold Bickford (16 May 1876 – 23 October 1958) married Tessie Veronica Murphy in 1916
- Reginald Bickford (26 January 1880 – 20 November 1948) married Rosa Florence Cudmore (30 September 1879 – 22 July 1954) on 17 November 1910
- Norman Forsyth Bickford (1881 – )
- Leslie Bruce Bickford (30 December 1885 – ) married (Helen) Dorothy Murray in 1912

- Rosina Mary Ferguson (1845 – 5 October 1898) married Harry Bickford (24 February 1843 – 6 September 1927) on 10 March 1870. Among their children were:

- (Isabella) May Bickford (12 April 1872 – 28 July 1933) (never married)
- H(arry) Fairweather Bickford (1874 – 8 July 1906) married May Innes-Ker (1876 – 22 August 1906) on 18 March 1903
- Harding William Bickford (14 January 1877 – 5 August 1919)

- William Andrew "Willie" Ferguson (c. 1850 – 21 September 1924) married his cousin Rachel Rosina Bell ( –1937) on 20 April 1892. He was manager of Moolooloo station, then Mooloolooo North.

- Christina Forsyth "Chrissie" Ferguson (4 March 1893 – 1982) married Robert Lionel Dawes (1899–1945) on 24 February 1926
- Dorothy Carrington "Doss" Ferguson (9 August 1900 – 1976) married Leonard Vivian Ragless (1895–1972) in 1928
- William Bell Ferguson (1894–1978) married Lena Ruby Ragless (1892–1943) on 3 April 1919

- Elizabeth Helen Ferguson (1850 – 18 April 1913) married Alexander Scott Murray (16 January 1846 – 23 August 1880) in 1874. Alex was the eldest son of A. B. Murray and his first wife Charlotte Murthwaite Murray, née Scott. A monument to his memory was erected in Wirrabara.

- Colin Campbell Murray (12 December 1875 – )
- Charlotte Scott Murray (14 March 1877 – 1958)
- Arthur Ferguson Murray (15 July 1878 – 19 June 1949)

- John Thomas Ferguson (1852 – 20 September 1921) married Catherine Agnes Barrington "Kate" Williams, née McNamara ( – 24 November 1946) in 1895. He died at Willippa station where he was manager for 45 years.

- John Forsyth Ferguson (18 February 1897 – 28 December 1930) of Willippa station, died of Bright's disease.
- Isabelle Mary Ferguson (28 May 1899 – 1969) married Martin Vincent McAuley in 1927
