= Liam Bekric =

Australian Paralympic swimmer

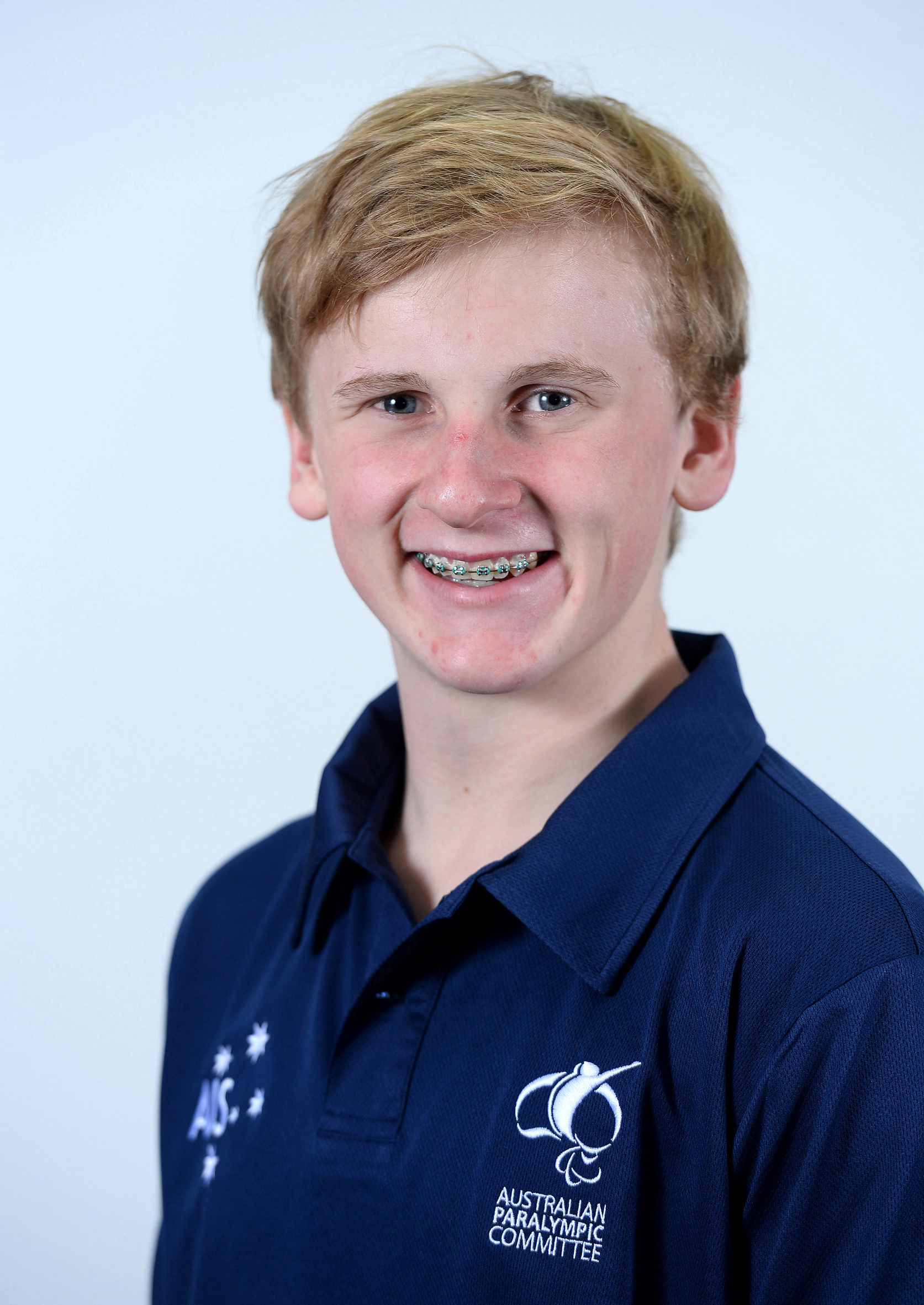
- 2016 Australian Paralympic team portrait

Personal information
- Full name: Liam James Bekric
- Nickname: Bed-Quick
- Nationality: Australia
- Born: 7 January 2001 (age 25)

Sport
- Sport: Swimming
- Strokes: Breaststroke
- Classifications: S13, SB13, SM13
- Club: Norwood Swimming Club
- Coach: Shaun Curtis

Liam Bekric (born 7 January 2001) is an Australian Paralympic swimmer with a vision impairment. Bekric represented Australia for the first time at the 2016 Rio Paralympics.

== Personal ==
Bekric was born on 7 January 2001 in Adelaide, South Australia, to parents Dragan and Tracy, and is brother to Josh, Riley and Darcy. He was born with retinitis pigmentosa, a hereditary, degenerative eye condition that results in tunnel vision and can lead to blindness. It was detected when he was six years old. Bekric's great-uncle and father have the same condition. In 2016 he was a student at Underdale High School in Adelaide. He was an ambassador for Variety and the Royal Society for the Blind – Dark to Light walk. After swimming, he would like to be a schoolteacher.

== Swimming ==
Bekric competes in the S13 classification for swimmers with vision impairment. He started swimming lessons at three years old. He is a member of the Norwood Swimming Club. He began swimming competitively in 2011 and made his breakthrough in 2014. In 2013, Bekric slipped while playing soccer and fractured his wrist. The injury kept him out of the pool for a month before he got a waterproof cast and continued training. He competed at the Australian Swimming Championships for the first time in 2014. In November 2014, he won a bronze medal in the multi-class 50m breaststroke at the Australian Short Course Championships. Bekric was just 13 years old, the youngest competitor at the event, and he was racing competitors 10 years his senior. He was just 0.1 of a second off getting silver.

At the 2015 Australian Swimming Championships, he made the final in the Men's 50m breaststrokes finishing fifth and the Men's 50m butterfly finishing seventh. Bekric won gold at the 2015 Australian Age Championships, in the 50m freestyle and breaststroke – defending both his titles from 2014. He also took silver in the Men's 50m and 100m butterfly, bronze in the Men's 200m individual medley. He represented Australia for the first time at the 2015 Japanese National Championships and won gold medals in the Men's 50 & 100m breaststroke and Men's 50m freestyle.

As of 2016, he is a South Australian Sports Institute scholarship holder.

At the 2016 Rio Paralympic Games, Bekric finished fourth in the final of Men's 100m Breaststroke SB13, but did not progress to the finals in the Men's 400m Freestyle S13, Men's 100m Backstroke S13 or Men's 200m Individual Medley SM13.

In 2017, he was inducted into Swimming South Australia Hall of Fame.
