= Highgate, South Australia =

Highgate
- Suburb
- Interactive map of Highgate
- Coordinates: 34°57′47″S 138°37′12″E
- Country: Australia
- State: South Australia
- City: Adelaide
- LGA: City of Unley
- Established: 1881

Population
  - Total: 1,504 (SAL 2021)
- Postcode: 5063
Suburbs around Highgate
Malvern	Fullarton	Myrtle Bank
Malvern	Highgate	Myrtle Bank
Kingswood	Netherby	Urrbrae

Highgate is a suburb of Adelaide in the City of Unley. It is surrounded by Fullarton and Malvern.

== History ==
European settlers arrived in the area in 1839 and surveyed. Part of section 251, Hundred of Adelaide, was purchased by William Ferguson, who named the 248 acres (100 hectares) Rosefield after his wife Rosina Ferguson.

Some time before 1854 a 40-acre (16 ha) section was purchased by George White (1813–1876), tailor of Hindley Street and owner of "White's Rooms", who lived there with his family. He established a large formal garden and developed 25 acres (10 ha) as a vineyard. By 1875 his cellars had 54,000 imperial gallons (250 kl) storage in wood, and in that year produced 5,000 imperial gallons (23 kl). White died in 1876, and his widow sold the property, which in September 1881 was laid out as Highgate-on-the-Hill by F.J. Botting (1819–1906), naming it after the English town in which he was born.

The area's name was later shortened to Highgate. By 1900 most newspaper advertisements referred simply to "Highgate" and by 1920 references to "Highgate-on-the-Hill" had been dropped entirely. In the 1948 Fullers Adelaide Street Directory (map 20) it is stated as "Highgate".

== Buildings ==
Rosefield Methodist Church on Carlton Street, Highgate, was built in 1968, and became a Uniting Church in 1977. It replaced the William Jeffries Memorial Methodist Church, which was opened on 21 August 1922, replacing an iron church built in 1911, during Jeffries' ministry.

== Education ==
- Highgate School in Hampstead Avenue is a Reception to Year 7 school which opened in 1923.
- Concordia College is a Lutheran secondary school with 82 teaching staff.
