= William Jeffries (minister) =

English Methodist minister

William Henry Jeffries (5 December 1845 – 22 December 1921) was an English Methodist minister with a considerable career in Adelaide, South Australia.

== History ==
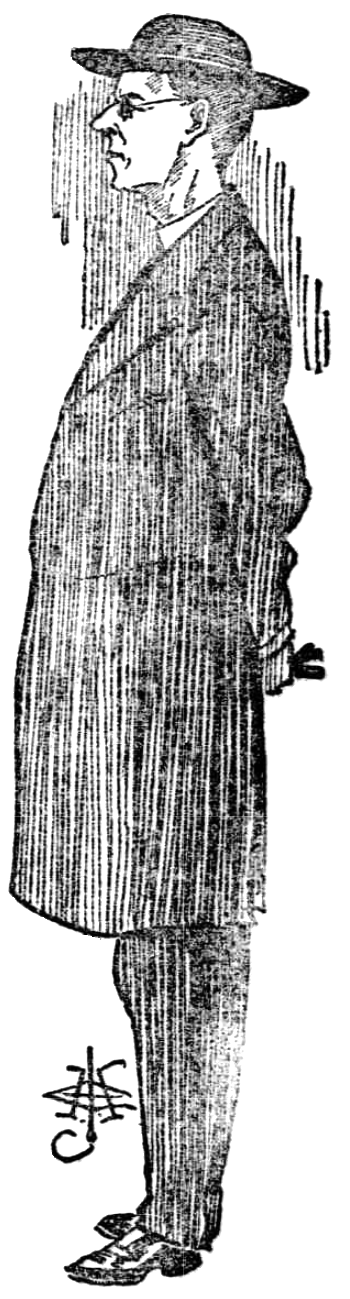
Rev. W. H. Jeffries by J. H. Chinner

Jeffries was born in Fairfield, Liverpool, where his father was a prominent Methodist and his mother a daughter of a Captain Williams of the Royal Navy. He was educated at the Liverpool Collegiate school and became interested in Methodism at an early age, and was accepted as a candidate for the Wesleyan Methodist ministry at the British Conference of 1869. He preached and ministered in the Blackburn circuit, England, for twenty years — at Welshpool, Mold, Newcastle-under-Lyme, Tunbridge Wells, Derby, Oldham, and Stockport, before in 1889 requesting and receiving a posting to Australia, taken in the hope of the warmer climate being beneficial to the health of his wife. He worked in Queensland for nine years, in the circuits of Warwick, Toowoomba, and Brisbane.

His first appointment in South Australia was to Kadina in early 1898, but was only there a year before he was urgently transferred to Broken Hill, where the Methodist church was in deep trouble. Mrs Jeffries and others of their family found accommodation in Glenelg.

In 1904 he was elected President of the South Australian Conference.

He took over the pulpit at Kent Town, where he remained five years, then five years at Parkside, in 1911 opening a new galvanised-iron church building, holding 80 persons, at Carlton Street, Rosefield (today's Highgate). He was four years at Archer Street, North Adelaide, then one year at Woodville before returning to Kent Town for a year. At the Conference of 1917 he requested superannuation, and was placed on the supernumary list, residing at Epworth Lodge, Toorak.

In 1921 he left for a visit to England, where he died in London following a short illness.

== Recognition ==
In September 1918 a celebration of his 50-year service was held at Kent Town, the scene of much of his work.

On 8 January 1922 an In Memoriam service was held at the Kent Town church in his honour, led by Rev. W. A. Potts, and the sermon preached by Rev. John N. Nield.

He was frequently called to fill the higher offices in the gift of the Church. He was Chairman of the District several times, was Secretary of the Conferences once, was President twice, first in Queensland and then in (South Australia). His sagacity as an administrator made him a strong connexional man. The ethical side of a question always appealed to him, and he was ever a moderating force in matters where difference of opinion arose. His courage, his geniality, his wisdom in counsel made him a conspicuous figure in dealing with the business side of Church affairs, and he never under the stress of keenest controversy lost sight of the highest spiritual interests which were involved. His was not an ordinary personality. No one could come into contact with him without being impressed. Tall and somewhat stately, everything that was not meet and right seemed in his presence impossible . . . he was a chivalrous Christian gentleman, and he exercised a wide influence in his own Church and in the religious life of the community.

C. H. Ingamells said of him

His influence was great for good. His courage, geniality, and wise counsels made him a conspicuous figure. He combined lovable gentleness with manly courage, but could be exceedingly firm when necessity demanded. He was not a man to give offence. In every sense he was a true Christian gentleman.

Jeffries Memorial Church at Rosefield, on Carlton Street, Highgate (now a Uniting Church), was named in his honour. It replaced a corrugated-iron structure erected by Jeffries in 1911.

== Family ==
Jeffries married Mercy Wibmer (c. 1849 – 25 February 1903) sometime around 1880. Their children included:

- Eleanor Wibmer "Elsie" Jeffries A.R.C.M. (1882 – 26 October 1974) was a piano teacher and nurse in WWI.
- Captain, later Major Dr Lewis Wibmer Jeffries DSO OBE (9 August 1884 – 6 October 1971) was a surgeon at the Adelaide Hospital for about 18 months before continuing his studies in America and India. He was appointed superintendent of the Queen's Hospital for Children at Hackney, London, then returned to South Australia to take up a practice. At the outbreak of war he joined the 4th Field Ambulance.
- Sir Shirley Williams Jeffries (1886–1963) was several times a member of the South Australian House of Assembly and an Australian rules footballer.
