= Gordon Campbell (cricketer) =

Australian cricketer and soldier

Personal information
- Full name: Gordon Cathcart Campbell
- Born: 4 June 1885; Myrtle Bank, Adelaide, South Australia
- Died: 13 August 1961 (aged 76); Woodville South, Adelaide, Australia
- Batting: Right-handed
- Role: Wicket-keeper

Domestic team information
- Years: Team
- 1909/10-1914/15: South Australia

Career statistics
Competition	First-class
Matches	23
Runs scored	497
Batting average	15.06
100s/50s	0/0
Top score	43
Catches/stumpings	28/20
- Source: Cricinfo, 30 August 2019

Gordon Cathcart Campbell MC (4 June 1885 – 13 August 1961) was an Australian cricketer who played first-class cricket for South Australia from 1909 to 1915. He was awarded the Military Cross and bar in the First World War, and was later a lawyer in Adelaide.

== Life and career ==
Campbell was born in the Adelaide suburb of Myrtle Bank. He was educated at St Peter's College and the University of Adelaide, where he studied arts and law.

Campbell appeared in 23 first-class matches as a right-handed batsman who kept wicket. He scored 497 runs with a highest score of 43 and held 28 catches with 20 stumpings. He toured North America with an Australian team from May to September 1913, a tour of 54 matches including five first-class matches. He was selected in the Australian team which was to tour South Africa in 1914-15 as one of the two wicket-keepers, as well as the manager and third selector; but war prevented the tour.

During the First World War, Campbell served in the First Australian Imperial Force (1st AIF) with the rank of captain. He was awarded the Military Cross in the 1917 New Year Honours, and was awarded a bar to his Military Cross in November 1917. After the war ended, Campbell was appointed by the Australian Board of (Cricket) Control as its representative in dealings with the AIF Sports Control Board about the proposed AIF team which was formed out of military personnel as the Australian Imperial Force Touring XI.

Campbell returned to the law in Adelaide after the war and became a principal in the firm of Bennett, Campbell & Ligertwood. In 1928 he set up his own practice.
