= Netherby, South Australia =

Netherby
- Suburb
- Coordinates: 34°58′21″S 138°37′22″E
- Country: Australia
- State: South Australia
- Region: Southern Adelaide
- City: Adelaide
- LGA: City of Mitcham
- Established: 1945

Government
  - State electorate: Unley
  - Federal division: Boothby

Population
  - Total: 1,510 (SAL 2021)
- Time zone: UTC+9:30 (ACST)
  - Summer (DST): UTC+10:30 (ACST)
- Postcode: 5062
- County: Adelaide
Suburbs around Netherby
Malvern	Highgate	Myrtle Bank
Kingswood	Netherby	Urrbrae
Kingswood	Mitcham; Springfield	Springfield

Netherby Subdivision Plan showing allotments for sale in 1913

Netherby is an inner-southern suburb of Adelaide, South Australia which lies within the City of Mitcham. It is bordered by the suburbs of Springfield, Kingswood, Mitcham and Malvern.

Netherby is located within walking distance of Mitcham Square Shopping Centre and sports facilities.

== History ==
Netherby Homestead was built by Colonel James Henderson in 1847. It was also the residence of Sir William Morgan, Premier of South Australia from 1878 to1881, until his death in 1883. Netherby Homestead was demolished in 1941. In 1913 the estate was subdivided into 134 allotments , creating Netherby and Montrose Avenues. Further subdivision was done in 1817, 1922, 1949 and 1950.

== Schools ==
Unley High School and Urrbrae Agricultural High School are located within the suburb. The suburb is in close proximity to Mercedes College and Scotch College as well as St Josephs and Mitcham Primary schools and Mitcham Girls School.

== Governance ==
Netherby is located in the federal electorate of Boothby, and has been represented since 2022 by Louise Miller-Frost of the Australian Labor Party. The seat was previously held by the Liberal Party since 1948: John McLeay, Sr. (1949–1966), John McLeay, Jr. (1966–1981) and Steele Hall (1981–1996).

During the 2020 electoral district redistribution Netherby was transferred to the Electorate of Unley and has been represented by David Pisoni of the Liberal Party.

The local government of Netherby is the Mitcham Council, where the suburb is located in the Boorman Ward.
