= Underdale High School =

Coordinates: 34°55′S 138°33′E

- Adelaide, South Australia; Australia

Information
- Type: Public secondary school
- Motto: Resilience Optimism Courage Knowledge
- Established: 1965
- Principal: Mary-Lou Michael
- Grades: 7–12
- Enrollment: 700
- Colour
- Website: www.underdale.sa.edu.au

Underdale High School is a medium-sized government secondary school, located in Underdale in the western suburbs of Adelaide.

== School facilities and resources ==
School facilities include music and drama suites, a library and an automotive centre. Sporting facilities include a gymnasium and weights room, two soccer pitches, eight tennis courts, and 2 basketball courts within the Gymnasium (1 full and 2 half courts). The school has a specialist Football (Soccer) Academy, a Gifted Program, and an Automotive Program.

Since late 2018, Underdale has also constructed a STEM Area, allowing for students to engage in Scientific, Technological, Engineering and Mathematical Studies.

In 2020, the Department for Education engaged contractor BESIX Watpac to complete a renovation to the existing Tech Studies, Home Economics, Woodwork, Metalwork, Outdoor Courts and Landscaping, Gymnasium, East Wing, West Wing and Administration areas. This work also included the construction of a new Creative Arts facility and relocation of a Canteen and installation of various sheds. The works were completed in 2021.

== Curriculum ==
- English
- Art – Music or Drama
- Mathematics
- PD/Health/PE/Football
- Humanities – Geography, History or SOSE
- Science
- Industrial Arts
- 2nd Language
- Special Education
- Home Economics
- Technology
- Year 7–10 curriculum International Baccalaureate
- Year 11–12 curriculum South Australian Certificate of Education ("SACE")

== Languages ==
Underdale offers courses in English as a foreign or second language, Japanese (日本語 Nihongo), and Greek (Ελληνικά, Ellīniká). Underdale hosts many international students, for short and long stays.

== Notable alumni ==
- Liam Bekric – Australian swimming team Rio Paralympics
- Brett Burton – AFL footballer Adelaide
- Alison Davies – Australian Women's rowing eight Atlanta and Sydney Olympics
- Glenn Freeborn – AFL footballer North Melbourne, Collingwood
- Scott Freeborn – AFL footballer Carlton
- David Hookes – Australian Cricketer
- Jennifer (Vesnaver) Hogan – Australian representative rower and Emmy award-winning journalist
- Frank Pangallo – journalist and member of the South Australian Legislative Council
- Lucas Pantelis – A-League Soccer Player
- Nick Pesch – AFL footballer Adelaide and Melbourne
- Robert Pyman – AFL footballer North Melbourne, Collingwood and Melbourne
- Louise Stacey – Australian Open Tennis participant and youngest ever winner of Australian Hardcourt Tennis title.
- James Troisi – Professional Footballer (Socceroos)
- Aurelio Vidmar – Australian National soccer team and Socceroos Assistant Coach
- Tony Vidmar – Australian National soccer team
- Al Hassan Toure – Professional Footballer (Macarthur FC & Olyroos)
- Mohamed Toure – Professional Footballer (Adelaide United & Olyroos)
