= Unley Park railway station =

Railway station in Adelaide, South Australia

Unley Park
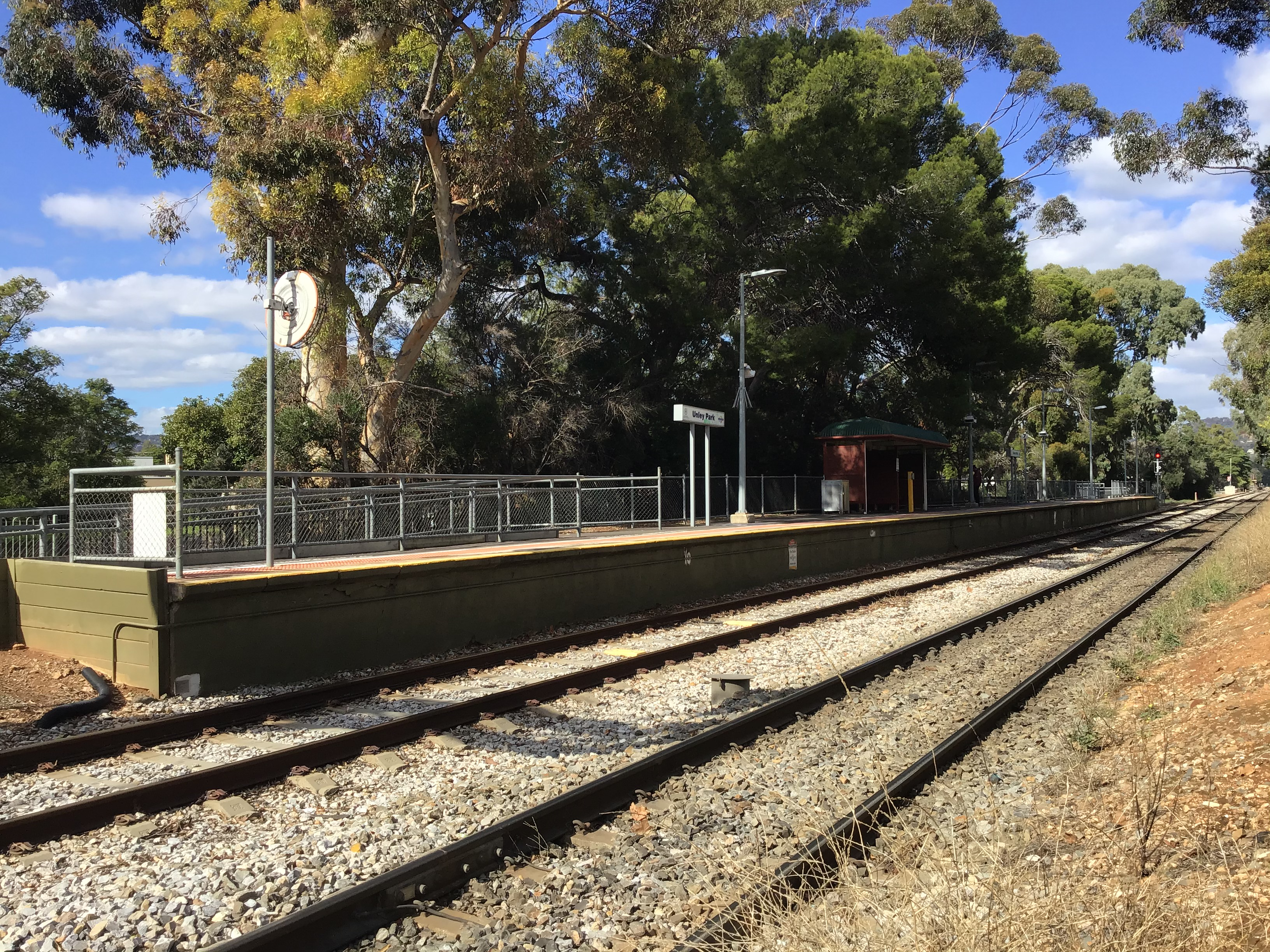
- Southbound view of the station platform, May 2020

General information
- Location: Wurilba Avenue, Hawthorn
- Coordinates: 34°57′59″S 138°35′52″E
- Owner: Department for Infrastructure & Transport
- Operator: Adelaide Metro
- Line: Belair
- Distance: 7 km from Adelaide
- Platforms: 1 Side
- Tracks: 2 (1 broad gauge, 1 standard gauge)
- Connections: Bus

Construction
- Structure type: Ground
- Parking: No
- Cycle facilities: No
- Accessible: Yes

Other information
- Station code: 16566 (to City); 18579 (to Belair)
- Website: Adelaide Metro

History
- Opened: 1910s
- Rebuilt: 1980s and 2000s

Services
Preceding station	Adelaide Metro	Following station
Millswood towards Adelaide	Belair line	Mitcham towards Belair
Location

Unley Park railway station is located on the Belair line in suburban Adelaide, Australia. It is on the boundary between Hawthorn and Westbourne Park, on the south side of Cross Road, seven kilometres from Adelaide station.

== History ==
The station was opened around the 1910s.

It was temporarily closed in 1995 when one set of tracks through the station was converted to standard gauge as part of the One Nation Adelaide-Melbourne line gauge conversion project. The western platform was demolished as part of the project.

== Services by platform ==
Platform	Destination/s
1	Adelaide/Belair

== Bus transfers ==
The closest bus stops are Stop 173 on Cross Road and Stop 12 on Hilda Terrace.

Bus transfers: Stop 173 (Cross Road)
Route no.	Destination & route details
100	Armada Arndale – Plympton – Glen Osmond

Bus transfers: Stop 12 (Hilda Terrace)
Route no.	Destination & route details
200	City – Clapham – Westfield Marion

== Gallery ==
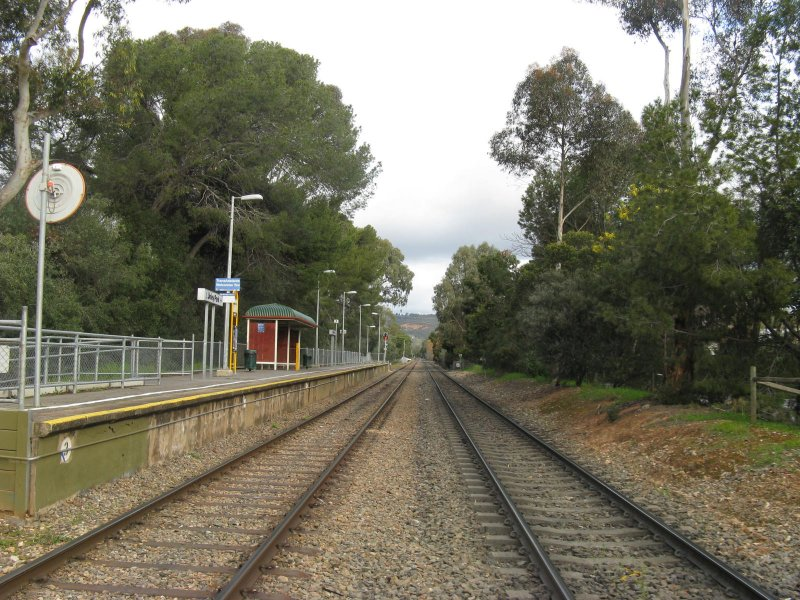
Southbound view in August 2008

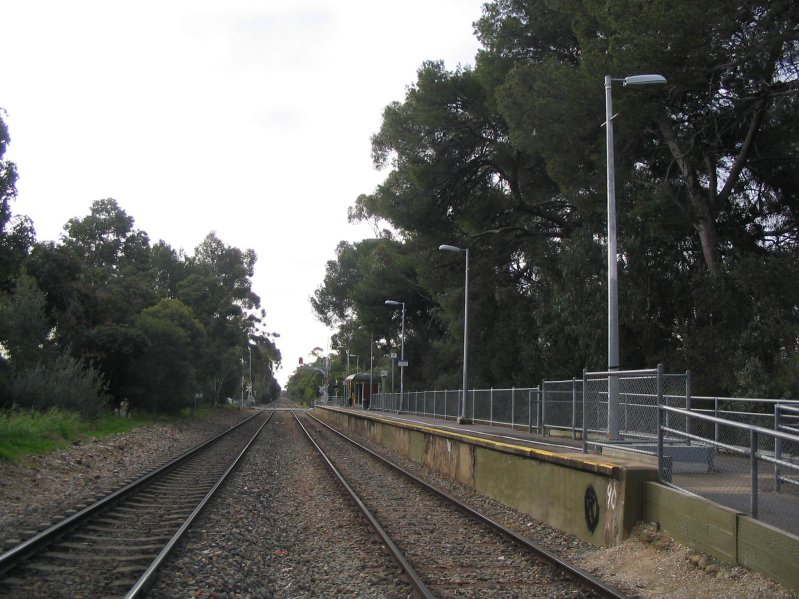
Northbound view in August 2008

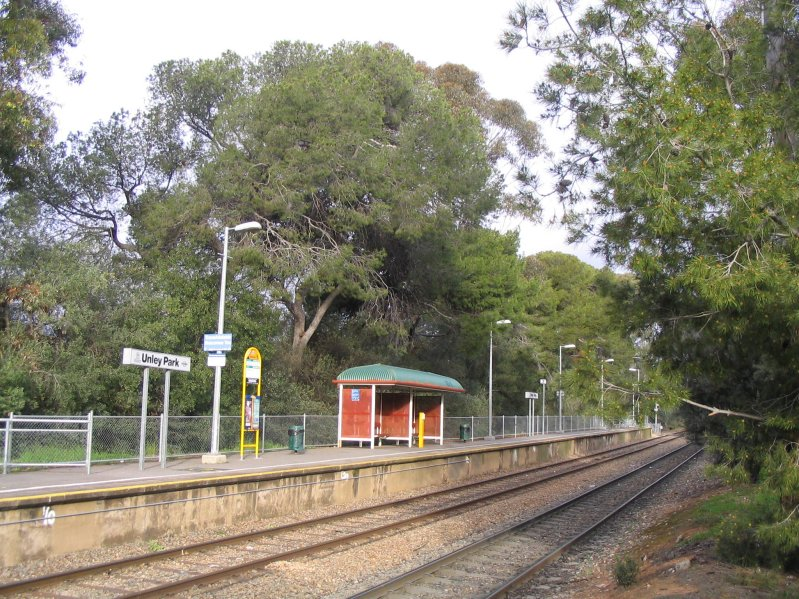
Station in August 2008

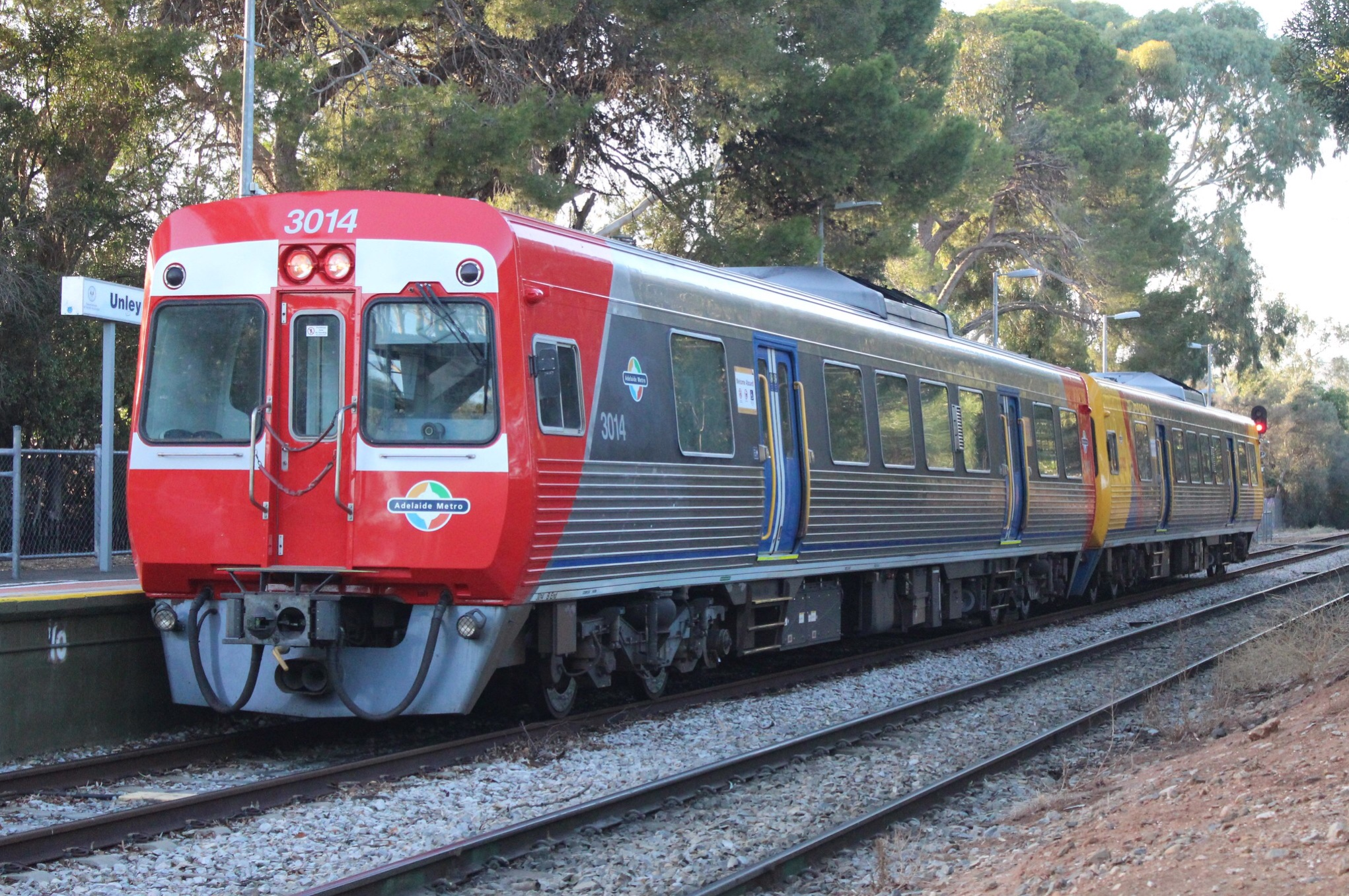
Station in April 2019
