= Urrbrae Agricultural High School =

Location
- 505 Fullarton Road, Netherby; Adelaide, South Australia, 5062; Australia; 34°57′56″S 138°37′32″E

Information
- Type: Secondary school
- Motto: Science with Practice
- Established: 1913; 113 years ago
- Principal: Todd George
- Gender: Co-educational
- Enrolment: ~1500
- Colours: Green, yellow and maroon
- Song: Old McDonald
- Website: www.urrbraehs.sa.edu.au

Urrbrae Agricultural High School is a public high school in the Australian state of South Australia, with ~1,500 students. The school is in the Adelaide suburb of Netherby, about 5 kilometres (3.1 mi) south-east of the Adelaide city centre. It is adjacent to the Waite Agricultural Research Institute of Adelaide University, the CSIRO Agricultural Research facilities in the suburb of Urrbrae, and various other agricultural and horticultural facilities established by Peter Waite, the University of Adelaide, and the South Australian state government.

The school is designated as a Special Interest School in Agriculture and the Environment, and is the only comprehensive special interest agricultural secondary school in South Australia. Its courses are focussed on agriculture, horticulture, viticulture, aquaculture, environmental earth, and other science subjects. Agricultural awards are awarded in these areas each year through the Mortlock Scholarships. Urrbrae has a science and technology background, with technology workshops, and many related courses available to students; (e.g. woodwork and automotive technology).

Urrbrae Agricultural High School has an application process for students in Year 6 who wish to attend Urrbrae in their secondary school years. Unlike most public schools, Urrbrae is not part of the zonal system, and does not accept students based on where they live. Being the only comprehensive special interest agricultural secondary school in the State, it has students from all over the state. Students from country and distant areas often board locally, and many students travel long distances to school.

The campus includes a 35 hectare farm, (total size including farm, wetlands and school. TAFE is 45 hectares) and Year 10 students give trail tours to visiting students from other schools. Urrbrae also has a swimming pool, a rock climbing wall, tennis courts and large playing fields. A third of the site is a wetland.

== History ==
The school was founded in 1932 through a bequest from Peter Waite, (a South Australian pastoralist and public benefactor), as a school to teach agriculture to boys. In 1972 it enrolled its first two female students, and in 2002 it achieved its first year-level that was equally represented by both genders.

The Urrbrae Old Scholars Association was established in 1934.

== Buildings ==
A	Administration facilities, library and the TAFE
B	Middle school, wellbeing and IT support
C	Senior centre, study, detention
D	Arts Block
E	English classes
F	Humanities (HaSS) Classes and Year 7 Homegroups
G	Mathematics classes
H	The School Hall/Drama Classroom – used for performances, special occasions, etc.
J	Business studies and Special education
K	Health, Home Economics, Physical Education facilities and the gymnasium (used for assemblies)
L	Agriculture Classrooms
M	Agriculture and Science Laboratories
N	Canteen, Cafeteria and Staff Room
P	Technology Workshops
Q	Metal Technology workshops and TAFE classrooms
W	Western Spine – Facilities such as toilets, year 8 and 9 lockers and some offices.
Z	Media Block

== Farm ==
The UAHS farm is a 35 hectare farm which has many enterprises, including:

- Sheep
- Cattle
- Poultry
- Aquaculture (such as Barramundi and Yabbies)
- Horses
- Orchard
- Bees
- Alpacas
- Native Animals (including Australian marsupials, such as Wallabies, Sugar Gliders, and nocturnal species, plus lizards and snakes)
- Goats
- Vineyard & winery (Wine is produced on campus by students)
- Olive trees
- An extensive Wetland
- Pigs
- Native Animals
- Birds

There are many lunch time clubs for students, with one for nearly every enterprise on the farm, including poultry, horses, plants and bee-keeping. Although club membership is voluntary, these clubs have high participation rates.

== Notable alumni ==
=== Federal politicians ===
- Neil Andrew – former Federal speaker
- Graeme Campbell
- Patrick Secker

=== State politicians ===
- Robert Brokenshire
- Bruce Eastick – Liberals leader in SA in Dunstan era, later Speaker in Tonkin Government years
- Peter Lewis – SA speaker
