= Urrbrae, South Australia =

Urrbrae
- Suburb
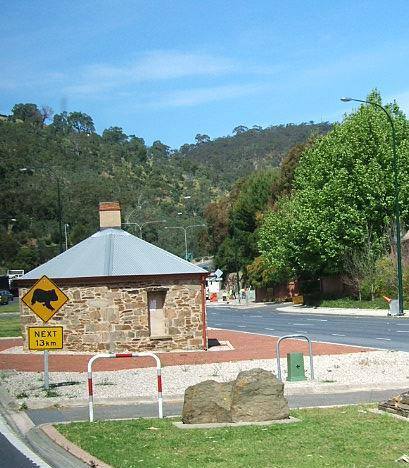
- Old Toll House. Urrbrae is to the right.

- Coordinates: 34°58′11″S 138°38′18″E
- Country: Australia
- State: South Australia
- Region: Southern Adelaide
- City: Adelaide
- LGA: City of Mitcham
- Location: 5.6 km (3.5 mi) SE of Adelaide CBD

Government
  - State electorate: Waite
  - Federal division: Boothby

Population
  - Totals: 1,070 (SAL 2021); 992 (2006 census)
- Time zone: UTC+9:30 (ACST)
  - Summer (DST): UTC+10:30 (ACST)
- Postcode: 5064
- County: Adelaide
Suburbs around Urrbrae
Highgate	Myrtle Bank; Glen Osmond	Glen Osmond
Netherby	Urrbrae	Glen Osmond; Mount Osmond
Netherby	Netherby; Springfield; Brown Hill Creek	Mount Osmond

Urrbrae is a suburb of Adelaide, South Australia. It is located in the City of Mitcham.

Located at the foot of the Adelaide Hills, it is bordered on the east by the South Eastern Freeway, and the Old Toll House, which marked the traditional entrance to the city of Adelaide in the 19th century.

== History ==
In the early 1850s, Robert Forsyth Macgeorge bought land in the area and built a house, naming the estate Urrbrae after the village Haugh of Urr in Scotland; the word brae refers to a hillside, especially near a river or creek. One notable son was the architect James Macgeorge (1832–1918).

== Demographics ==
The 2016 Census by the Australian Bureau of Statistics counted 966 persons in Urrbrae on census night. Of these, 47.3% were male and 52.7% were female.

The majority of residents (68.5%) were of Australian birth, with other common census responses being China (5.3%) and England (5.2%).

The age distribution of Urrbrae residents was comparable to that of the greater Australian population. 71.1% of residents were over 25 years in 2016, compared to the Australian average of 68.5%; and 28.9% were younger than 25 years, compared to the Australian average of 31.5%.

== Attractions ==
=== Urrbrae House Historic Precinct ===
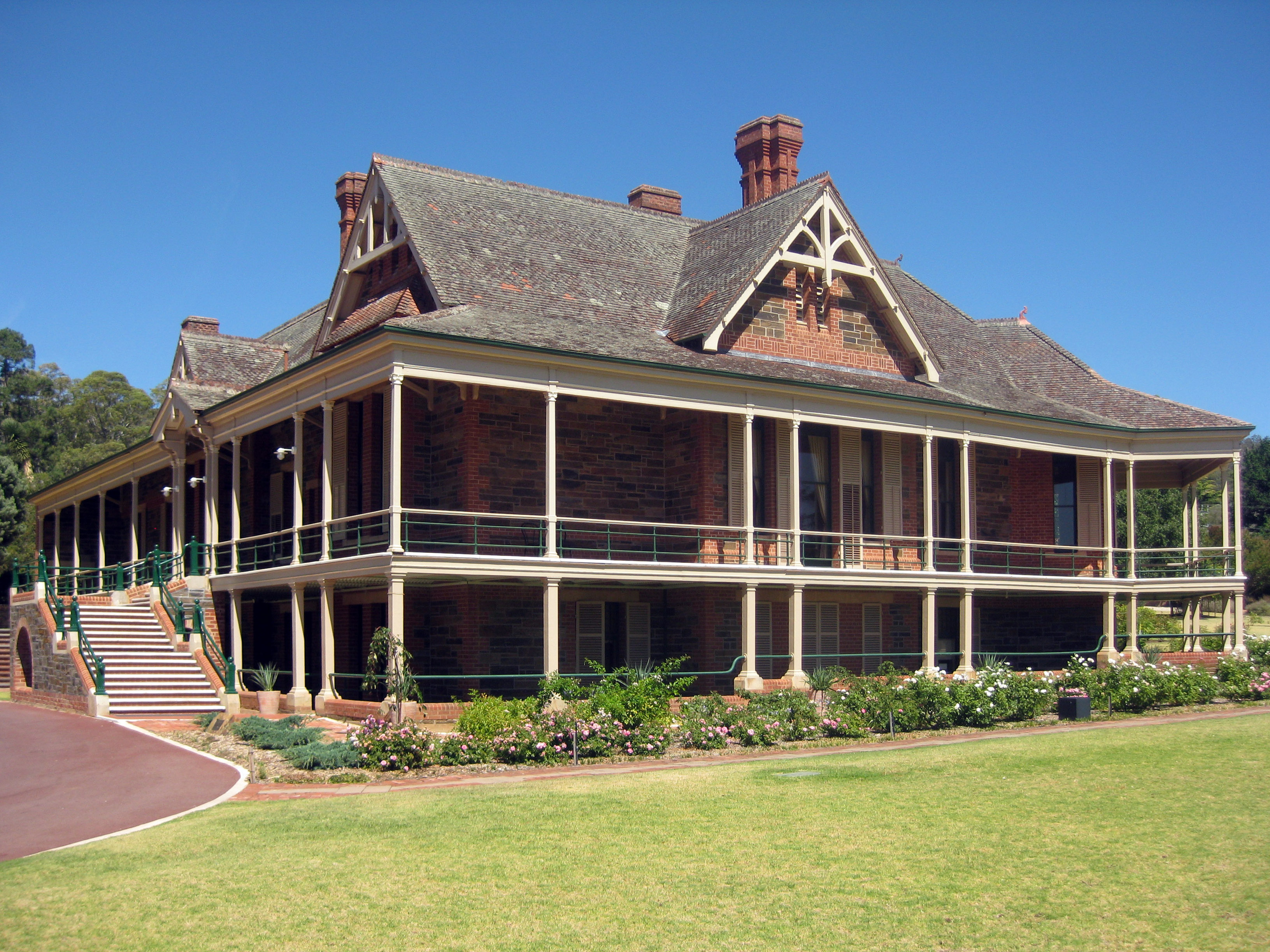
Urrbrae House

Urrbrae House is a two-storey, bluestone mansion located on Walter Young Avenue, on the Waite Campus of the University of Adelaide. Not the suburb's namesake, the current house was actually completed in 1891 by the philanthropist Peter Waite, replacing the original single-storey home of Robert MacGeorge, which was for many years rented by Edward Stirling Snr. It was probably Waite, a Scot like MacGeorge, who opted to carry on the name Urrbrae.

For many years, Urrbrae House was the family home of Waite, his wife Matilda and their family. After Peter and Matilda's death, the house was bequeathed to the University of Adelaide, being handed over in February 1923 by the couple's two daughters.

Urrbrae House was the first home in Adelaide to be electrified.

The house and its surrounds now constitute the Urrbrae House Historic Precinct within the university campus.

=== St Paul's Retreat Monastery ===
On Cross Road, in the suburb's north, lies the Roman Catholic monastery of St Paul's Retreat. Formerly an oriental-style mansion named The Glen, the house was occupied for several years by a retired Indian judge. Later, the house passed to the Boothby family before being sold in 1896 to the Passionist Catholic order. The monastery serves the Catholic community in the Glen Osmond and Parkside areas.

As well as the monastery, St Paul's Retreat includes a convent and other facilities lying outside the suburb.

=== Waite Research Precinct ===
As well as the University of Adelaide's Waite Campus, the precinct contains:

- Australian Centre for Plant Functional Genomics (ACPFG);
- Australian Grain Technologies
- Australian Wine Research Institute (AWRI);
- CSIRO research laboratories;
- Primary Industries and Regions SA (PIRSA)
- South Australian Research and Development Institute (SARDI)
- Urrbrae Agricultural High School

=== University of Adelaide Waite Campus ===
The University of Adelaide's Waite Campus is primarily located in the west and southwest of Urrbrae, extending into the neighbouring suburbs of Springfield and Brown Hill Creek.

Developed on land bequeathed by the late owner of Urrbrae House, Peter Waite, Waite Campus holds several research facilities:

- Waite Research Institute (WRI)
- Waite Conservation Reserve
- Waite Arboretum

=== Parks ===
There are parks and small reserves throughout the suburb.

== Transport ==
=== Roads ===
Cross Road forms the northern boundary of Urrbrae and Fullarton Road forms part of the eastern boundary. The intersection of Cross Road, Glen Osmond Road, and Portrush Road forms the entry to the South Eastern Freeway.

=== Public transport ===
Urrbrae is serviced by public transport run by the Adelaide Metro.

== Climate ==
Climate data for Urrbrae (Waite Institute) (115m ASL)
Month	Jan	Feb	Mar	Apr	May	Jun	Jul	Aug	Sep	Oct	Nov	Dec	Year
Record high °C (°F)	43.6 (110.5)	43.1 (109.6)	41.4 (106.5)	36.6 (97.9)	28.8 (83.8)	21.9 (71.4)	25.5 (77.9)	26.3 (79.3)	31.3 (88.3)	33.4 (92.1)	40.7 (105.3)	41.2 (106.2)	43.6 (110.5)
Mean daily maximum °C (°F)	27.7 (81.9)	27.6 (81.7)	25.6 (78.1)	21.4 (70.5)	17.8 (64.0)	15.0 (59.0)	14.1 (57.4)	15.2 (59.4)	17.5 (63.5)	20.2 (68.4)	23.2 (73.8)	25.8 (78.4)	20.9 (69.6)
Daily mean °C (°F)	22.0 (71.6)	22.1 (71.8)	20.5 (68.9)	17.2 (63.0)	14.3 (57.7)	11.8 (53.2)	10.9 (51.6)	11.7 (53.1)	13.4 (56.1)	15.6 (60.1)	18.0 (64.4)	20.3 (68.5)	16.5 (61.7)
Mean daily minimum °C (°F)	16.2 (61.2)	16.5 (61.7)	15.4 (59.7)	12.9 (55.2)	10.7 (51.3)	8.5 (47.3)	7.7 (45.9)	8.1 (46.6)	9.2 (48.6)	10.9 (51.6)	12.8 (55.0)	14.7 (58.5)	12.0 (53.6)
Record low °C (°F)	8.0 (46.4)	10.1 (50.2)	7.8 (46.0)	5.4 (41.7)	5.0 (41.0)	3.3 (37.9)	2.6 (36.7)	2.9 (37.2)	3.8 (38.8)	4.3 (39.7)	5.6 (42.1)	8.4 (47.1)	2.6 (36.7)
Average rainfall mm (inches)	23.8 (0.94)	23.5 (0.93)	24.0 (0.94)	52.3 (2.06)	76.6 (3.02)	76.6 (3.02)	87.6 (3.45)	75.4 (2.97)	63.5 (2.50)	52.2 (2.06)	36.7 (1.44)	29.5 (1.16)	617.8 (24.32)
Average rainy days	5.2	4.7	5.8	10.5	14.8	16.4	18.4	18.2	14.5	12.6	8.9	7.2	137.2

== See also ==
- List of Adelaide suburbs
