= Kingswood, South Australia =

Kingswood
- Suburb
- Coordinates: 34°58′21″S 138°36′43″E
- Country: Australia
- State: South Australia
- Region: Southern Adelaide
- City: Adelaide
- LGA: City of Mitcham
- Established: 1945

Government
  - State electorate: Waite
  - Federal division: Boothby

Population
  - Total: 2,554 (SAL 2021)
- Time zone: UTC+9:30 (ACST)
  - Summer (DST): UTC+10:30 (ACST)
- Postcode: 5062
- County: Adelaide
Suburbs around Kingswood
Unley Park	Malvern	Highgate
Hawthorn	Kingswood	Netherby; Mitcham
Hawthorn	Torrens Park	Mitcham

Kingswood is a suburb of the Australian city of Adelaide in the City of Mitcham.

Kingswood is bounded to the west by Belair Road, to the north by Cross Road, to the south by Princes Road and to the east by Unley High School and the western boundaries of properties fronting onto Smith Dorrien Street. The suburb is the home of Mitcham Primary School, Mitcham Girls High School and St Joseph's School. Local landmarks include Kingswood Oval, Eynesbury House, Our Lady of Dolours Catholic Church and the historic Torrens Arms Hotel.

== History ==
Kingswood is located on the traditional lands of the Kaurna people who occupied the Adelaide plains and hills before European settlement.

Kingswood was developed between 1877 and 1942 from two parts bounded by Cross Road, Belair Road, Princes Road and Smith-Dorrien street. Kingswood was established in 1945 as a formal proposal by the City of Mitcham to "eliminate superfluous subdivisions names" as requested by the Surveyor General of South Australia. At establishment, it consisted of the sub-divisions of Kingswood Estate, Kingswood Park, Mitchamville and a portion of Old Mitcham. In February 2003, it was enlarged by the addition of portions of the adjoining suburbs of Netherby and Mitcham.

Eynesbury House

The original two story version of Eynesbury House on Belair Road was built in 1854 by George Letchford who sold the property in1872 to George Willcox. He added a two story stable and a coach house. He enlarged the house in the Victorian Italianate style and added the three story tower.

The Torrens Arms Hotel at the corner of Princes Street and Belair Road was built by John Prince in 1857.

An electric tramway connecting Kingswood to the city centre was opened in 1917, with its terminus in Harrow Terrace near Kyre Avenue. The tramway was replaced with buses in 1954 with a new terminus at the corner of Tutt Avenue and Smith-Dorrien Street.

== Notable people ==
Australia's first female prime minister, Julia Gillard, was a student at Mitcham Primary School, Kingswood, from 1969 to 1973. A building at the school is named in her honour.

== See also ==
- List of Adelaide obsolete suburb names
