= Mercedes College (Adelaide) =

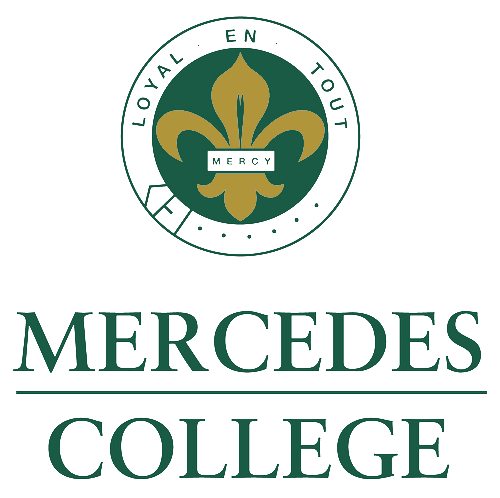

Location
- Springfield, South Australia; Australia; 34°58′34″S 138°37′45″E

Information
- Type: Independent co-educational primary and high day school
- Motto: French: Loyal en Tout (Loyal in All)
- Religious affiliation: Sisters of Mercy
- Denomination: Roman Catholic
- Established: 1954; 72 years ago
- Chairman: Louise Mathwin
- Principal: Andrew Balkwill
- Chaplain: Deacon Andrew Kirkbride
- Key people: Paul Wadsworth (Deputy Principal); Bill Deegan (Head of Senior School); Jarrad McCabe (Head of Middle School); Kellie Osborn (Head of Junior School)
- Years: R–12
- Gender: co-educational
- Enrolment: c. 1,200
- Campus type: Suburban
- Colours: Green, gold and navy blue
- Slogan: Unlocking Life Potential
- Mascot: "Camels"
- Affiliations: International Baccalaureate; Council of International Schools; Sports Association for Adelaide Schools; Junior School Heads Association of Australia
- Website: www.mercedes.catholic.edu.au

Mercedes College is an independent Roman Catholic co-educational primary and High day school located in the Adelaide inner-south suburb of Springfield, South Australia, Australia.

Established by the Sisters of Mercy in 1954 as a boarding school for girls, it is now a co-educational day school. Mercedes is an International Baccalaureate (IB) school, and offers the PYP, MYP, and South Australian Certificate of Education (SACE) programmes.

== History ==
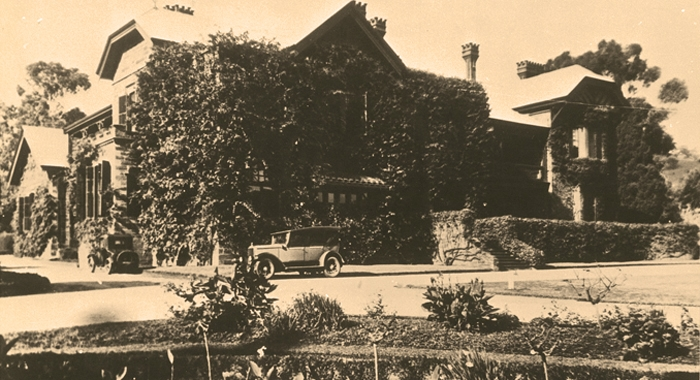
Strathspey, c. 1910.

The school was established by the Sisters of Mercy in 1954. The purchase of the 8.1 hectares (20 acres) site at Springfield brought to fruition the dream of finding a healthier environment for the girls' boarding school until that time part of Saint Aloysius College in Angas Street, Adelaide. With the eighty boarders on opening day were sixty day scholars, mostly girls but with a group of boys in the infant section.

After twenty-one years the boarding school was phased out when rising costs and a decline in the rural economy made it financially beyond the means of the very families it was created to serve. In 1976 the school became co-educational with the first intake of boys in the Year 8 and numbers have grown. The Mercedes property was originally part of the Springfield Estate. It was sold to Sir John Duncan, (father of Sir Walter, Speaker of the Australian House of Representatives for many years) who planned the house in 1891 and built it in 1899. The family home was named Strathspey after his childhood home in Scotland.

The Duncans eventually bequeathed the property to the Presbyterian Church and it became St Andrew's Residential College attached to the University of Adelaide. In 1939 the property was sold to Mr and Mrs F. W. Cornell and it once again became a private residence.

Archbishop Reynolds, first Archbishop of Adelaide, was in Dublin in 1879 asking for sisters of his diocese when a group of sisters returned from Buenos Aires, forced by revolution to leave their home for twenty-four years. Some were the original Irish sisters but many were South American girls who left behind their families and homes. Accepting the Archbishop's invitation the twenty-four sisters arrived in Adelaide on 3 May 1880.

In 1953 the property was bought by the Sisters of Mercy, and approved by Xavier Dalton. Mercedes, the Spanish word for mercy, was chosen by the sisters to commemorate the circumstances of the Mercy foundation in Adelaide.

== Student life ==
Many of the students who study at Mercedes College live in the eastern suburbs of Adelaide and Adelaide Hills, because of the easy access by public transport. Mercedes College uses the Adelaide Metro bus service to transport nearby students.

== House system ==
As with most Australian schools, Mercedes College utilises a house system. At first there were two houses (McAuley and Fitzpatrick), but as enrolment numbers increased, two more houses were added. There are currently four houses, each named after memorable Mercy Sisters. The current houses are McAuley, Fitzpatrick, Dalton and Barry.

== Notable alumni ==
- Troy Broadbridge – AFL footballer (Melbourne Demons)
- Keegan Brooksby – AFL footballer (Hawthorn Football Club)
- Abby Coleman – radio presenter
- Kate Croser (1995) – film and television producer
- Hannah Davis (2002) – sprint canoeist
- David Feeney – politician
- Amos Gill – Hit 107 presenter, ABC ME host, comedian
- Peter Malinauskas – Premier of South Australia
- Orianthi – pop-rock singer/guitarist
- Teresa Palmer (2003) – actress
- Will Snelling (2015) – AFL footballer (Essendon Football Club)
- Kelli Underwood – sports commentator
- Natalie Medhurst – netballer
- Davie Fogarty – entrepreneur

== See also ==
- List of schools in South Australia
