= Peter Waite (philanthropist) =

South Australian pastoralist, businessman, company director and public benefactor

Australian pastoralist and philanthropist Peter Waite

Peter Waite (9 May 1834 – 4 April 1922) was a South Australian pastoralist, businessman, company director and public benefactor. Waite's philanthropic endeavors provided significant benefit to the University of Adelaide and to local public schools, and generations of students have benefited from his largesse.

== Career ==
Waite was born at Kirkcaldy, Fife, Scotland, son of James Waite, a farmer, and his wife Elizabeth, née Stocks. Waite was left fatherless. He later owned Momba Station, one of the largest sheep stations in outback New South Wales. Waite and other pastoralists in the area formed the Pastoralists' Association of West Darling in 1906.

On 21 November 1864 Waite married his first cousin Matilda Methuen (d.1922), a daughter of James Methuen of Leith, Scotland. Together they had eight children.

In 1883, he became chairman of Elder's Wool & Produce Co. Ltd, a subsidiary Elder Smith and Company. In 1888 the two companies were amalgamated and he became chairman of directors of Elder Smith & Co. Ltd, "displaying remarkable ingenuity and initiative". Waite was also managing director of the Beltana Pastoral Co. Ltd and the Mutooroo Pastoral Co. Ltd. He held directorships with the Commercial Union Assurance Co. Ltd, the British Broken Hill Co. Ltd, and the S.A. Woollen Co. Ltd.

== Philanthropic deeds ==
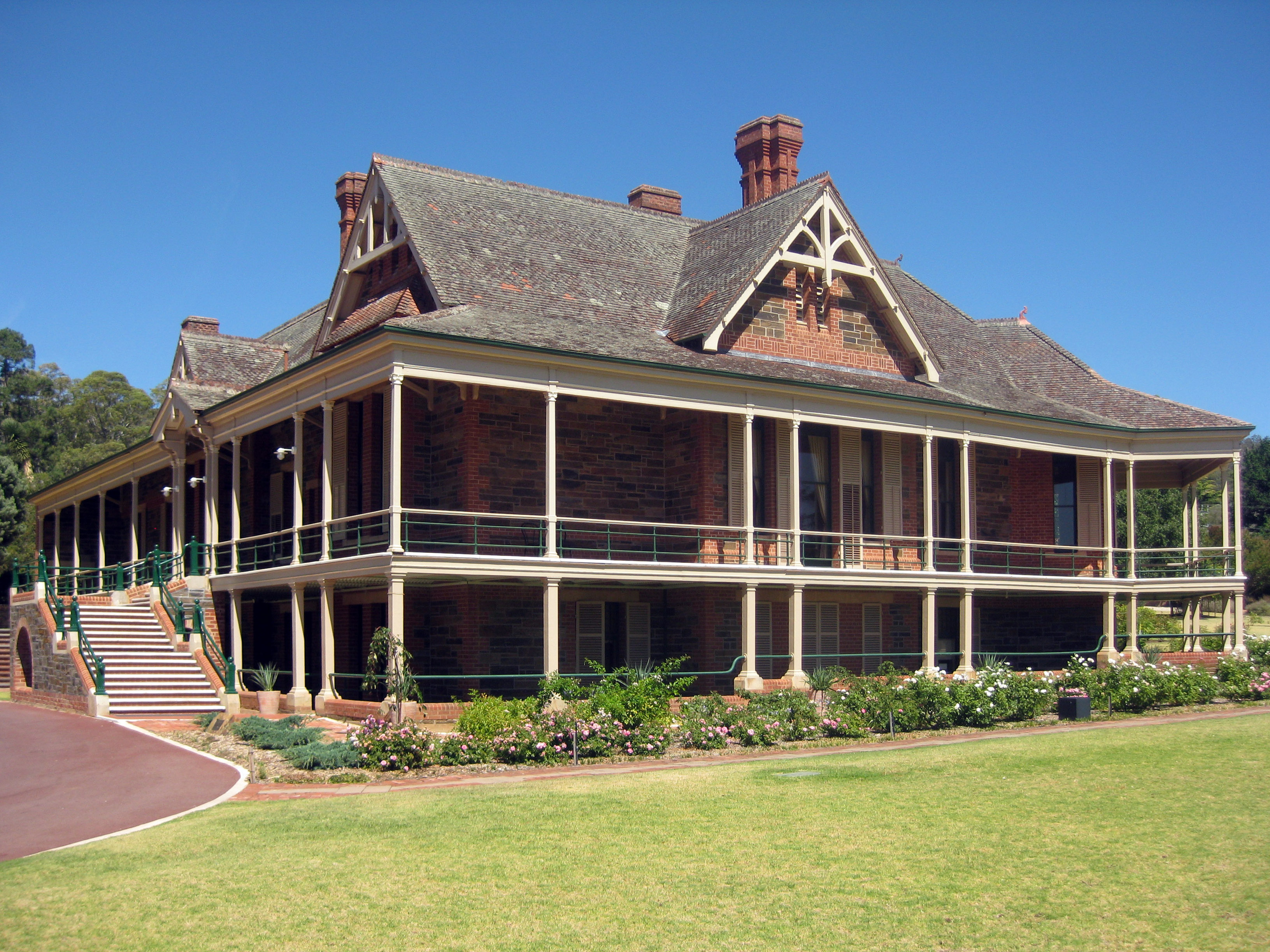
Urrbrae House, which was included in Peter Waite's bequest to the University of Adelaide. The house was his primary place of residence from 1891 when it was completed until his death in 1922.

The University of Adelaide created the Waite Agricultural Research Institute which later became the Waite Campus of the university, the hub of the Waite Research Precinct. The Waite Institute was established on the site in 1924.

The donation remains one of the largest public benefactions in South Australian history. The objective of the bequest was to advance the cause of education, and more especially, to promote the teaching and study of agriculture, forestry and other related subjects. The Waite Institute has developed into an integrated research and teaching precinct that has been presented as a model for the collocation of agricultural research institutions.
