= Lloyd Aviation =

Australian regional airline

IATA	ICAO	Call sign
UD	—	Queensland
- Founded: 1969
- Ceased operations: 30 September 1990
- Operating bases: Adelaide; Brisbane
- Fleet size: 34 (1987)
- Destinations: 12
- Parent company: TNT

Lloyd Aviation was an Australian regional airline established in 1969. It ceased operations on 30 September 1990.

== History ==
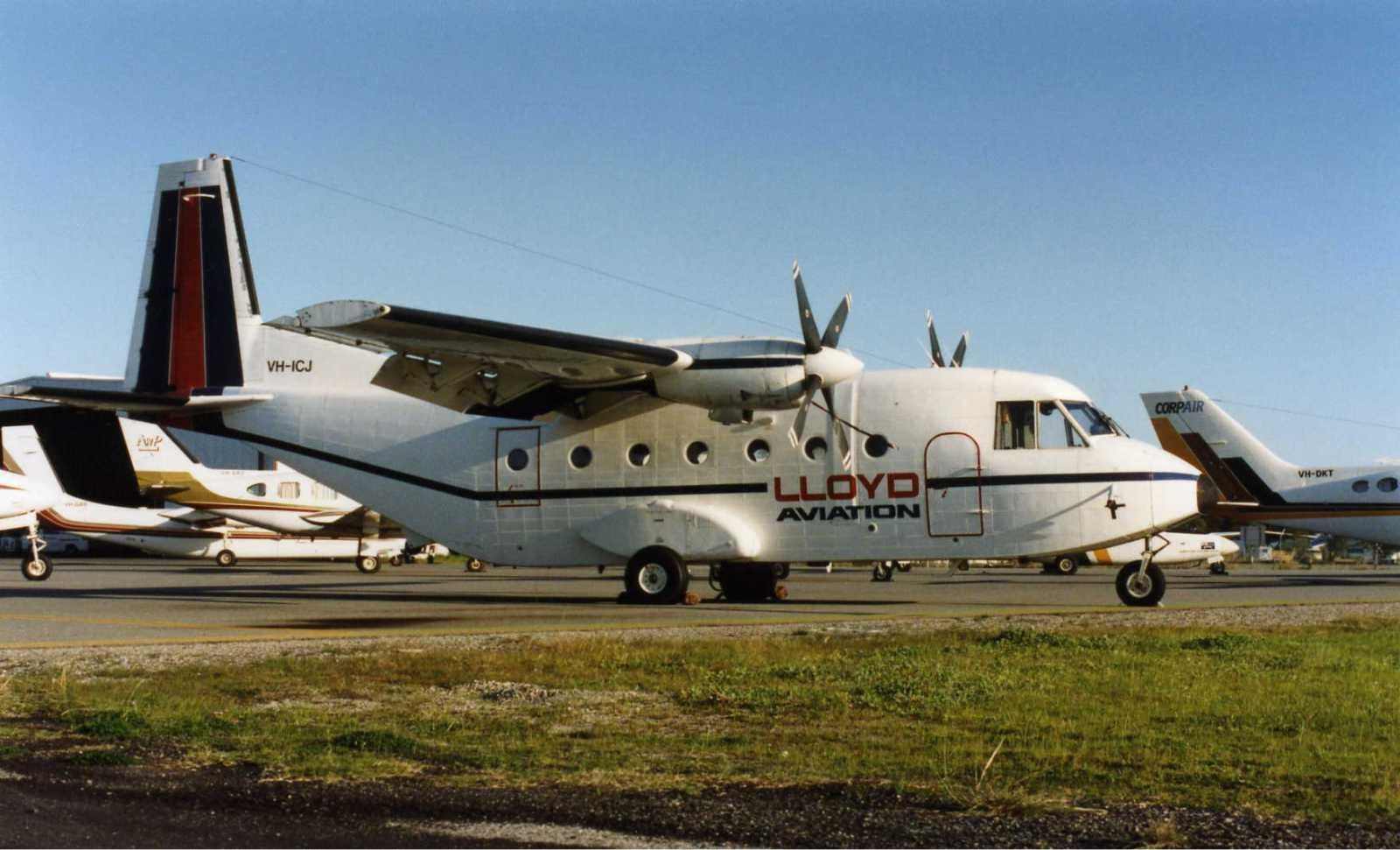
CASA C-212

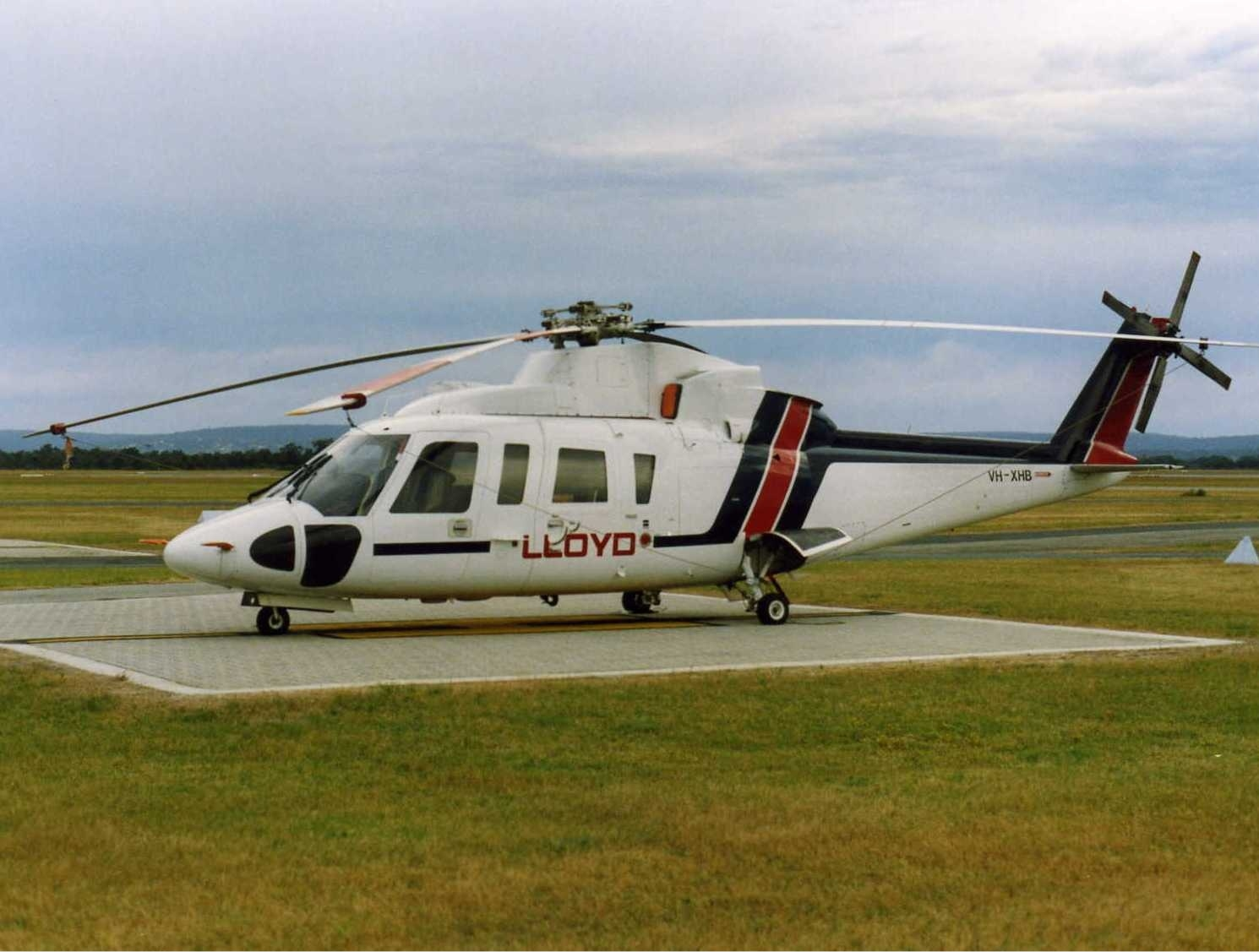
Sikorsky S-76 at Perth Airport

Lloyd Aviation was established in 1969 operating charters. In 1985 the airline acquired a 79-seat Fokker F28 and began operating a twice-daily Adelaide to Moomba route on behalf of energy company Santos. In 1986 Lloyd Aviation began operating EMB-110 Bandeirantes in South Australia. These aircraft began serving Kingscote, Olympic Dam, Port Lincoln and Whyalla from Adelaide. On 10 March 1986 it began operating routes to and from Broken Hill after Airlines of South Australia withdrew its service. Also in March 1986 Lloyd Aviation introduced Cessna Citation jets on their Adelaide to Port Lincoln and Adelaide to Whyalla routes (however these aircraft were soon withdrawn and replaced with Bandeirantes & Cessna 402s). By 1987 the airline was operating a fleet of 34 aircraft, based throughout the Northern Territory and South Australia.

On 1 June 1987 Lloyd Aviation began operations in Queensland on behalf of Ansett Australia. The airline established a base in Brisbane and soon began serving Bundaberg, Gladstone, Biloela, Blackwater and Emerald. During the later months of 1987 the airline scaled back its routes from Adelaide to Olympic Dam, Port Lincoln and Whyalla, but maintained its services to Kingscote. The airline also began using chartered Rockwell Aero Commanders on some services from Brisbane. On 11 November Lloyd Aviation introduced the 25-seat Mohawk 298 on the Brisbane to Bundaberg and Gladstone route on behalf of Ansett Australia. However these new Mohawk 298s performed poorly in Australian conditions and were later cited by staff as being a 'technical, operational and financial disaster'.

In the late 1980s Lloyd Aviation began to decline with the company selling off its Queensland division to Norfolk Group with some of the routes, assets and staff transferred to Queensland Pacific Airlines and ceasing all operations from Adelaide, with the exception of their Kingscote service. The airline was sold to TNT in 1988.

During the pilots' dispute of 1989 Lloyd Aviation began operating a leased Fokker F28 to and from Norfolk Island on behalf of East-West Airlines. During December 1989 the airline also introduced Short 330s on the Adelaide to Kingscote route, with the aircraft also being used for freight. In 1990, with the airline continuing to decline the decision was made to merge Lloyd Aviation with Skywest Airlines with the 21 aircraft in the airline fleet going to Skywest. On 30 September, Lloyd Aviation operated its final flight from Kingscote to Adelaide and subsequently ceased all operations.

== Destinations ==
Throughout its existence the airline operated to destinations such as:

- Adelaide
- Biloela
- Blackwater
- Brisbane
- Bundaberg
- Busselton
- Emerald
- Gladstone
- Kingscote
- Norfolk Island
- Olympic Dam
- Port Lincoln
- Whyalla

== Fleet ==
Throughout its existence, Lloyd Aviation operated:

- Beechcraft King Air
- Bell 206
- CASA C-212
- Cessna 402C
- Cessna 441
- Cessna 550 Citation II
- Embraer 110
- Embraer 120 (deposits paid, but never delivered)
- Fokker F28
- Mohawk 298
- Learjet 35
- Rockwell 690
- Short 330
- Sikorsky S-76
