= Airlines of South Australia =

IATA	ICAO	Call sign
GJ	—	ALSA
- Commenced operations: 1 July 1959; 67 years ago
- Ceased operations: 9 November 2005; 20 years ago
- Hubs: Adelaide
- Parent company: Ansett Transport Industries
- Website: www.airlinesofsa.com.au

Airlines of South Australia was an airline operated by Ansett Transport Industries from 1959 until 2005. The name was revived by an unrelated operator that operated from 1987 until 2005.

== History ==
=== Airline 1959–1986 ===
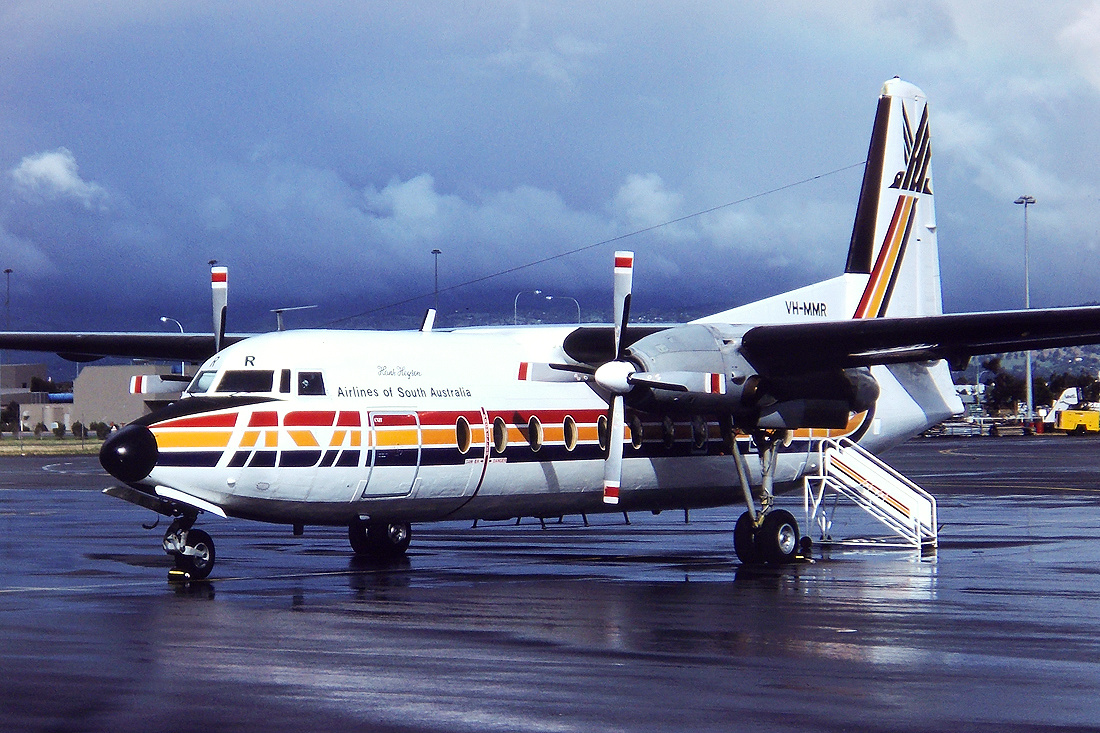
Airlines of South Australia Fokker F27-200 at Adelaide Airport in October 1987

On 1 July 1959, Ansett purchased Guinea Airways and rebranded it Airlines of South Australia (ASA) on 21 December 1959. ASA took over the Guinea Airways existing fleet of five Douglas DC-3s and an Auster, and added a 52-seat Convair 440.

From inception, ASA provided services from Adelaide to Port Lincoln, Minnipa, Ceduna, Cowell, Cleve, Kimba, Radium Hill, Broken Hill, Kangaroo Island, Port Pirie, Whyalla, Renmark, Mildura and Woomera.

Throughout the 1960s, services were briefly added to Naracoorte, Millicent and tours to Hayman Island, Queensland from Adelaide while several initial services were progressively discontinued. A Piaggio P166 and a Fokker F27 (the first of several) replaced older aircraft.

In November 1968 Airlines of South Australia was renamed Ansett Airlines of South Australia (AASA). By 1973, the fleet had reduced to three Fokker F-27s. In the mid-1970s, AASA trialled special interest weekend flights and began services to Mount Gambier. In 1979, charter flights to the gas fields at Moomba began. In 1980, a route sharing agreement was commenced with Rossair, and on 17 July 1981 Ansett reverted AASA back to the original name Airlines of South Australia. However, ASA faced increasing competition through the late 1970s and early 1980s, and in 1985, Ansett announced that another subsidiary Kendell Airlines would progressively move onto South Australian routes. In February 1986, Ansett announced that ASA would cease operations. The last passenger flight was made on 27 June 1986.

=== Airline 1987–2005 ===
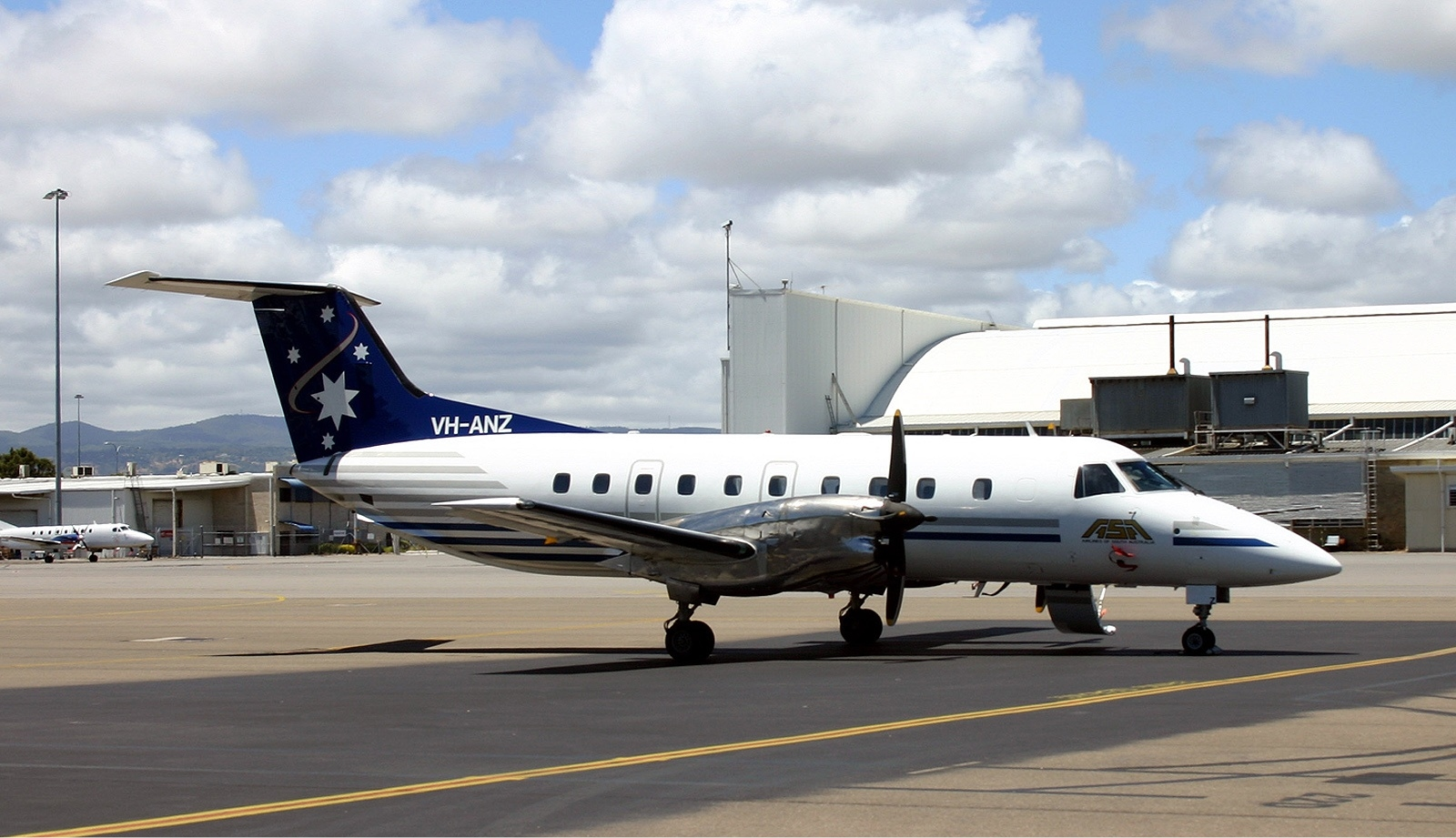
Airlines of South Australia Embraer EMB 120 in December 2003

Airlines of South Australia (ASA) was reborn in 1987, as a small regional airline. It operated scheduled services between Adelaide, Port Lincoln, Port Augusta, and Kingscote all in South Australia, as well as charter flights. It was part of the RegionalLink Airlines group which also included Airnorth and Emu Airways. Its main base was Adelaide Airport. Both ASA and Emu Airways ceased operations on 9 November 2005.

The airline was established in 1987 as Lincoln Airlines (based in Port Lincoln). It merged with Augusta Airways (based in Port Augusta) and was renamed Airlines of South Australia (ASA) in 1997.

In October 2003, Airnorth (based in Darwin, Northern Territory) purchased both Airlines of South Australia and Emu Airways (another small regional airline, based in Adelaide, operating from Adelaide to Kingscote) and merged the three companies into a single business entity called RegionalLink. The participating airlines continued to trade in their local markets under their own names, the logos of which were featured on the fuselages of aircraft within the group.

On 31 October 2005 Capiteq Limited, the parent company of Airlines of South Australia and Emu Airways, announced its intention that both airlines would cease operations effective 9 November 2005, citing the entry of QantasLink (soon to start flying to Port Lincoln and Kingscote) and other factors in their decision. This left Port Augusta with no scheduled air service.
