= ZBL =

Zbl or ZBL may refer to:

- Zbl (identifier), an identifier assigned to mathematical publications by zbMATH Open
- Biloela Airport (IATA code ZBL), an airport in Biloela, Queensland, Australia
- Blissymbol (ISO 639-3 code zbl), a constructed language
