= Kingscote Airport =

Airport of Kingscote, South Australia

Kingscote/Kangaroo Island Airport
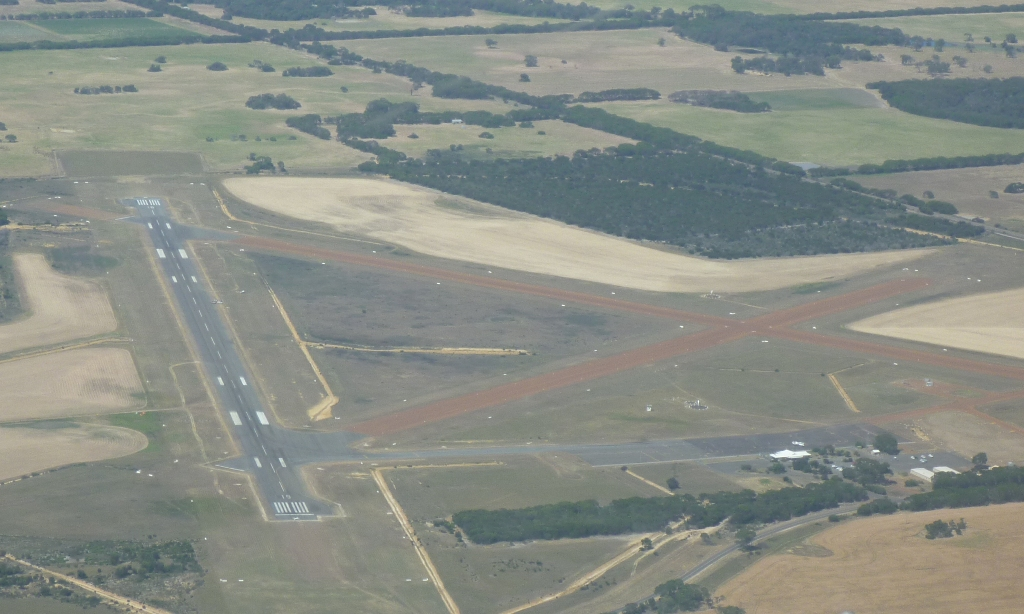
- Kingscote Airport prior to runway upgrade

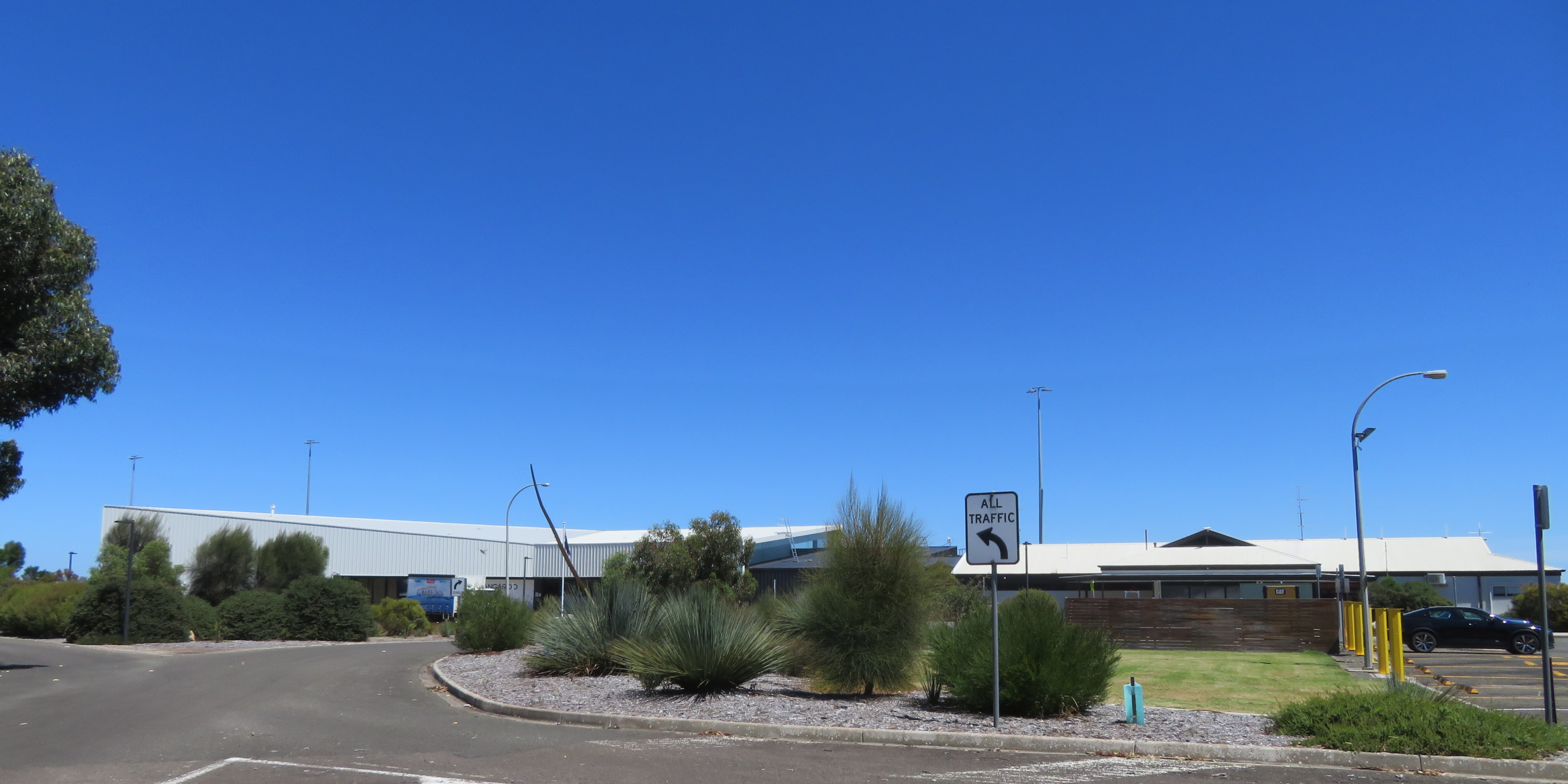
- The terminal building at Kingscote Airport
- IATA: KGC; ICAO: YKSC

Summary
- Airport type: Public
- Operator: Kangaroo Island Council
- Serves: Kangaroo Island
- Location: Cygnet River
- Elevation AMSL: 24 ft (7.3 m)
- Coordinates: 35°42′36.3″S 137°31′29.6″E

Map
- Location in South Australia

Runways
Direction	Length		Surface
Direction	m	ft	Surface
01/19	1,402	4,600	Asphalt
06/24	1,134	3,720	Gravel
15/33	1,164	3,819	Gravel

Statistics (2010/11)
- Passengers: 51,021
- Aircraft movements: 2,398
- Sources: Australian AIP and aerodrome chart

Kingscote Airport (IATA: KGC, ICAO: YKSC), also known as Kangaroo Island Airport, is located 6.5 nautical miles (12.0 km; 7.5 mi) southwest of Kingscote, South Australia, the main town on Kangaroo Island, in the locality of Cygnet River. The airport is the sole airport for Kangaroo Island. The airport is served by regular public transport and many charter flights. The airport is managed by the Kangaroo Island Council, which has operated the airport since 16 June 1983.

A runway upgrade and new terminal building were completed in May 2018, and officially opened by Prime Minister Malcolm Turnbull and Premier of South Australia, Steven Marshall, on 4 July 2018.

== Airline history ==
Guinea Airways operated the first commercial service to Kangaroo Island, commencing in the 1930s. In 1959, the airline was acquired by Airlines of South Australia (ASA), a subsidiary of Ansett. The airline's final service was on 4 April 1986. ASA primarily operated Convairs, Douglas DC-3 and Fokker F-27 aircraft. A Piaggio P166 was used infrequently in the 1970s, whilst Rossair operated Cessna 402s in an arrangement with ASA to replace the F27s in off-peak times.

Following the withdrawal of ASA, Kendell Airlines (another Ansett subsidiary), operated 19-seat Fairchild Metroliners and 34 seat SAAB aircraft to the Island. Upon Ansett's ultimate demise in 2002, Rex Airlines acquired the Kendell aircraft and continued services which were later dropped.

In competition with the larger aircraft, and generally with more flexible timetables, a succession of smaller airlines from the 1980s tried with varying success to maintain a 'second string' presence. The most successful, Emu Airways, commenced in 1980 and made its final flight in November 2005. Emu flew Piper Chieftain aircraft to Kingscote, American River, Penneshaw and Parndana, before air regulations dictated abandonment of all airstrips except Kingscote. Air Kangaroo Island (formerly Air Transit), flew Cessna 402s to the island during the 1990s. Keith Stevens operated Albatross Airlines for much of the 1980s and early 1990s.

From 1986 to 1990, Lloyd Aviation operated Embraer EMB 110 Bandeirante aircraft, before flying the Irish-made Short 330. For several years during the 1980s, Commodore Airlines (eventually becoming State Air) offered another alternative service. QantasLink briefly operated a service after the demise of Emu Airways, commencing 18 December 2005, but withdrew less than six months later. Air South started operations using a Cessna Titan in January 2007 but ceased regular flights on 17 October 2009.

Qantaslink announced they will commence year round services to Adelaide and seasonal services to Melbourne from December 2017. Routes to Adelaide were later upgraded to the larger Q400 aircraft, as deployed on most other regional SA routes.

In 2022, Rex terminated their Adelaide to Kangaroo Island service, leaving QantasLink as the sole operator of the route.

== Airlines and destinations ==
Airlines	Destinations
Lucas Air	Charter: Adelaide
QantasLink	Adelaide

== Statistics ==
Kingscote Airport was ranked 60th in Australia for the number of revenue passengers served in financial year 2010–2011.

Annual passenger and aircraft statistics for Kingscote Airport
Year	Revenue passengers	Aircraft movements
2001-02	63,445	8,640
2002-03	64,101	7,679
2003-04	62,677	6,622
2004-05	64,661	6,305
2005-06	60,252	3,541
2006-07	59,155	4,154
2007-08	63,985	5,744
2008-09	59,587	4,754
2009-10	54,480	3,256
2010-11	51,021	2,398
2011-12	41,311	2,237
2012-13	38,778	2,216
2013-14	37,851	2,147
2014-15	35,665	2,142
2015-16	36,467	2,125
2016-17	38,009	2,126
2017-18	42,702	2,184
2018-19	43,528	2,252
2019-20	31,651	1,780
2020-21	10,648	678
2021-22	11,959	752
2022-23	17,620	715
2023-24	26,419	976
2024-25	31,732	1,064

== See also ==
- List of airports in South Australia
