= Emu Airways =

Australian airline

IATA	ICAO	Call sign
TL	—	—
- Founded: April 1970
- Ceased operations: November 2005
- Hubs: Adelaide Airport
- Fleet size: 2
- Destinations: 2
- Headquarters: Adelaide, Australia
- Website: www.emuairways.com.au

Emu Airways was an airline based in Adelaide, Australia operating tourist flights to nearby Kangaroo Island. It was part of the RegionalLink Airlines group which also included Airnorth and Airlines of South Australia.

== History ==
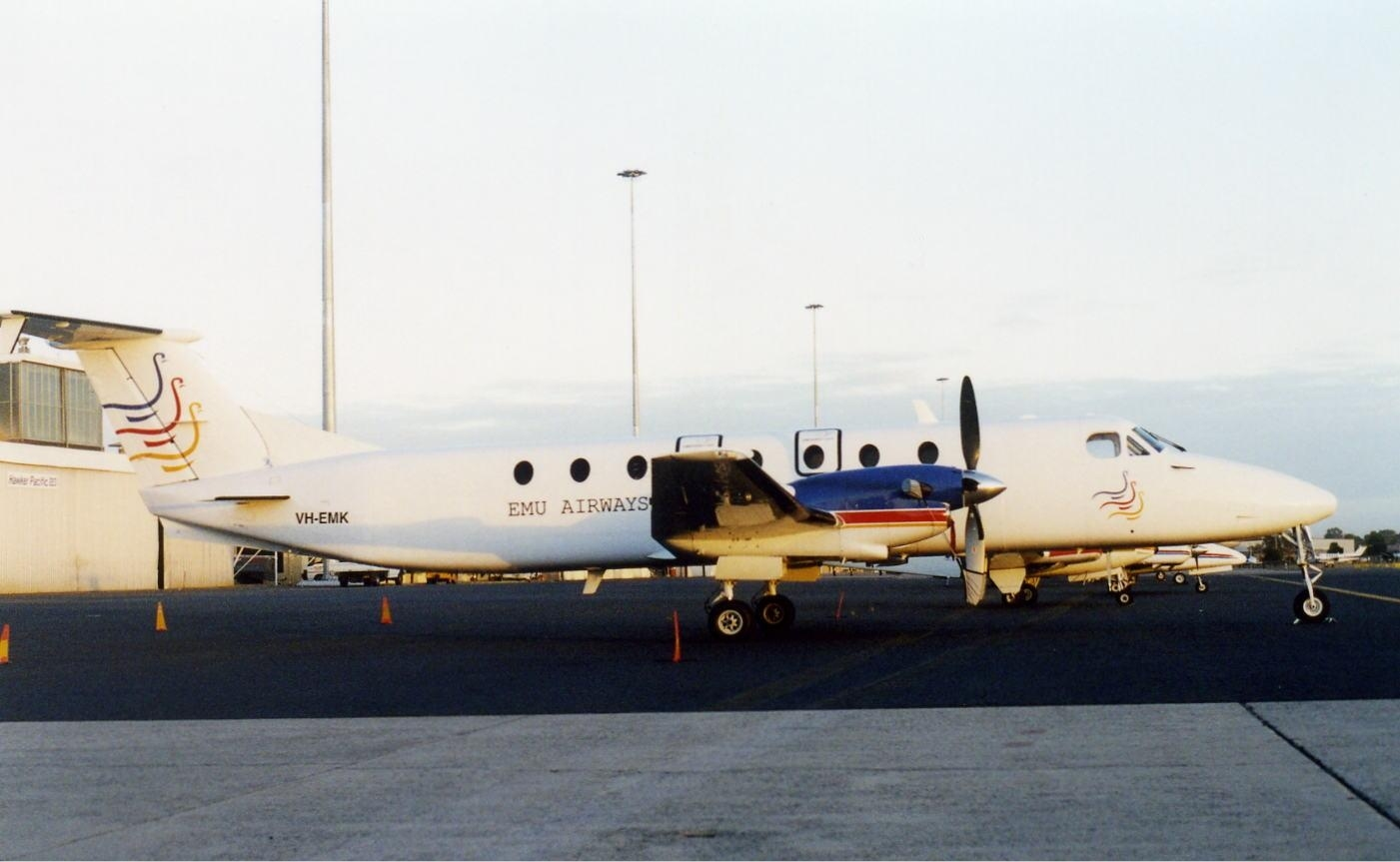
Beech 1900C at Perth Airport in 2001

Emu Airways was founded in 1970. It commenced regular operations in February 1974.

In March 2004, it was acquired by Darwin based aviation services company Capiteq, as part of a major new coalition of regional air services in Australia, RegionalLink Airlines. This was considered Australia's first airline franchise operation. All of the participating airlines continued to trade in their local markets under their own names, the logos of which were featured on the fuselages of aircraft within the group. Emu Airways and partner Airlines of South Australia ceased operations on 9 November 2005, citing the entry of QantasLink and other factors in their decision.

== Services ==
Emu Airways operated services Adelaide to Kingscote on Kangaroo Island. As at 1 April 1979, Emu Airways also served Parndana and American River on Kangaroo Island.

== Fleet ==
The airline's fleet varied over thirty years of operation, and included various light passenger aircraft, including the Cessna 402. As of the acquisition by Capiteq Limited, the fleet consisted of:

- 2 Raytheon Beech 1900C
