= Adelaide Airport (suburb) =

- Suburb
- Coordinates: 34°56′44″S 138°31′47″E
- Country: Australia
- State: South Australia
- City: Adelaide
- LGA: City of West Torrens
- Location: 6 km (3.7 mi) west of Adelaide city centre
- Established: 1991

Government
  - State electorate: West Torrens
  - Federal division: Hindmarsh
- Elevation: 2 m (6.6 ft)

Population
  - Total: 4 (SAL 2021)
- Time zone: UTC+9:30 (ACST)
  - Summer (DST): UTC+10:30 (ACST)
- Postcode: 5950
- Mean max temp: 21.5 °C (70.7 °F)
- Mean min temp: 11.4 °C (52.5 °F)
- Annual rainfall: 443.3 mm (17.45 in)
Suburbs around Adelaide Airport
| Fulham | Lockleys | Brooklyn Park |
| West Beach | Adelaide Airport | West Richmond, Netley |
| Glenelg North | Novar Gardens | North Plympton |
- Location; Adjoining suburbs

Adelaide Airport is a suburb in the City of West Torrens west of the Adelaide city centre. The suburb was proclaimed in 1991. Almost the entire area of the suburb is taken up by the Adelaide Airport and associated businesses. There is also Harbour Town shopping centre on the western side of the suburb.

The suburb is bounded by Tapleys Hill Road on the west and Sir Donald Bradman Drive and the Anna Meares Bike Path on the north. The eastern and southern boundaries match the airport boundaries.
