= Rossair (Australia) =

Australian airline

IATA	ICAO	Call sign
—	RFS	—
- Founded: 19 October 1963
- Ceased operations: July 2018
- Hubs: Adelaide
- Fleet size: 9
- Headquarters: Adelaide Airport, Australia
- Website: www.rossaircharter.com.au

Rossair was an air charter company based in Adelaide, Australia. In November 2013, it merged with Air South, another South Australian based charter company. In July 2018, the company was placed into voluntary administration.

== History ==
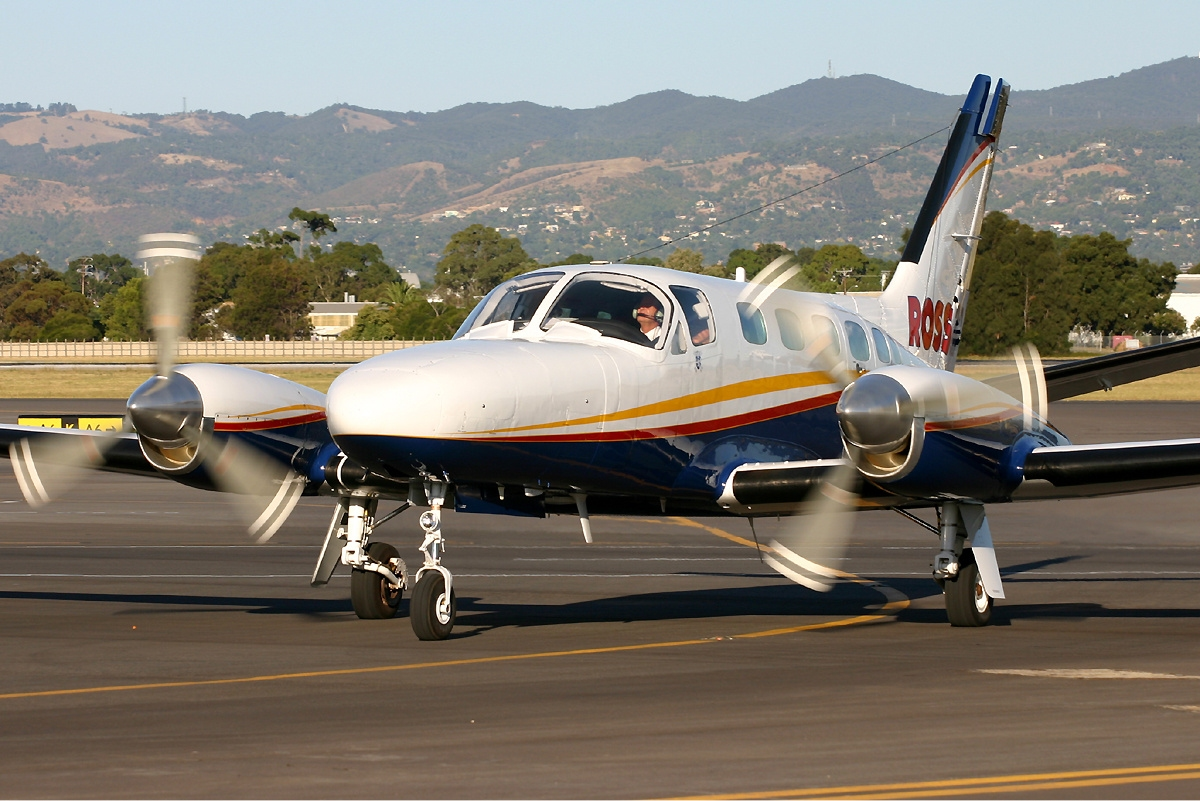
Rossair Cessna 441 at Adelaide Airport in 2006

Rossair was established in 1963. It was Australia's second oldest continually operating air transport company, the oldest being Qantas. On 1 June 2017 the company ceased operations after one of its aircraft on a training flight crashed in Renmark, South Australia. All three on board, including the company's chief pilot and a Civil Aviation Safety Authority inspector, were killed. Following this incident the company continued non-flying operations until July 2018 when it was placed into voluntary administration with EY appointed as the administrator.

== Fleet ==
As of November 2013 the Rossair fleet consisted of:

- 3 Cessna 441 Conquest II
- 2 Beechcraft 1900D
- 2 Embraer EMB 120 Brasilia

== Incidents and accidents ==
- On 25 January 1972, a Rossair Beechcraft V35A (registered VH-TYA) collided with a radio mast guy wire and subsequently crashed at Compressor Station 13 of the Moomba Natural Gas Pipeline, 65 miles south-east of Leigh Creek, South Australia. All four of the aircraft's occupants were killed.
- On 1 February 1976, a Rossair Cessna 172 (registered VH-UGC) collided with a Piper PA-28 Cherokee on final approach to Parafield Airport. All four people on board the Rossair Cessna 172 and the sole occupant of the Piper PA-28 Cherokee were killed.
- On 27 March 1976, a Rossair Cessna 180 (registered VH-TCU) suffered an in-flight breakup over the Adelaide suburb of Blackwood, killing the sole occupant.
- On 30 May 2017, an accident with a Rossair Cessna 441 (registered VH-XMJ) that took off from Renmark Airport and crashed approximately 4 kilometres away killed all three occupants on board.
