= Olympic Dam Airport =

Airport in Australia

- IATA: OLP; ICAO: YOLD

Summary
- Airport type: Private
- Operator: BHP, Olympic Dam Operations
- Serves: Olympic Dam mine
- Elevation AMSL: 344 ft (105 m)
- Coordinates: 30°29′06″S 136°52′36″E

Map
- Location in South Australia

Runways
Direction	Length		Surface
Direction	m	ft	Surface
07/25	1,860	6,102	Asphalt

Statistics (2024/25)
- Passengers: 101,784
- Aircraft movements: 1,303
- Sources: Australian AIP and aerodrome chart, passenger and aircraft movements from the Department of Infrastructure and Transport

Olympic Dam Airport (IATA: OLP, ICAO: YOLD) is an airport that serves the Olympic Dam mine in South Australia. Alliance Airlines and Virgin Australia operate public and charter services respectively between Olympic Dam and Adelaide, with planned expansions for the airport starting in 2006 and ongoing in 2011.

== General information ==
The airport is located at Olympic Dam, South Australia with the terminal located at 30°29′02.0322″S 136°53′02.7954″E with the local time zone (Australian Central Standard Time (ACST)) of +9:30 hours from UTC. The airport's codes are OLP for FlightStats and IATA, YOLD for ICAO and it does not have an FFA code, several car rental companies operate from the airport.

In 2007, there was a near mid-air collision between an Alliance Airlines plane and a charter flight, flooding in the region in 2010 did not affect the airport.

== 2011 expansion proposal ==
Relocation discussions were underway in 2006, with a discussion about either expanding the Olympic Dam airport or building a new one close to Andamooka. The area was set to have 5,000 contractors brought in by BHP, being planned that the airport would be relocated should the Olympic Dam mine expand to an open-cut configuration, the planned location was between Roxby Downs and Andamooka. Expansion plans outlined in 2011 included improving the airport to accommodate jets and passenger service, and making the runway all-weather capable. In March 2020, NRW Holdings was awarded a contract to upgrade the airport, by August 2021, a new larger runway had been built, and the older one closed and partially demolished.

== Airlines and destinations ==
Airlines	Destinations
Alliance Airlines	Adelaide
Virgin Australia	Charter: Adelaide

== Statistics ==
Olympic Dam Airport was ranked 46th in Australia for the number of revenue passengers served in financial year 2023–2024.

Annual passenger and aircraft statistics for Olympic Dam
Year	Revenue passengers	Aircraft movements
2001-02	19,289	1,304
2002-03	24,973	1,411
2003-04	25,715	1,727
2004-05	27,262	1,723
2005-06	37,112	1,924
2006-07	57,639	2,593
2007-08	74,099	2,278
2008-09	76,118	2,254
2009-10	60,168	1,809
2010-11	72,215	1,875
2011-12	90,438	2,462
2012-13	83,583	2,563
2013-14	76,103	2,233
2014-15	74,346	2,234
