= Couch grass =

Couch grass, as a vernacular common name, may refer to:

- Cynodon dactylon, known as couch grass in Australia and South Africa, often planted as a turf grass
- Elymus repens, known as couch grass in the United Kingdom and North America, often considered to be a weed
- Sporobolus virginicus, a perennial grass native to the southeastern United States that is often used as a lawn grass in warmer climates.
- Paspalum vaginatum, a perennial grass native to coastal areas in the Americas that is often used as a turf grass in salt-tolerant landscapes.
