= Biloela Airport =

- IATA: ZBL; ICAO: YBLE

Summary
- Airport type: Public
- Serves: Biloela, Queensland
- Location: Biloela, Queensland
- Coordinates: 24°23′45″S 150°30′00″E

Map
- Location in Queensland

Biloela Airport (IATA: ZBL) is an airport in Biloela, Queensland, Australia.

== See also ==
- List of airports in Queensland
