= Port Lincoln Airport =

Airport in North Shields, South Australia

- IATA: PLO; ICAO: YPLC

Summary
- Airport type: Public
- Owner/Operator: District Council of Lower Eyre Peninsula
- Serves: Port Lincoln, South Australia
- Location: North Shields
- Elevation AMSL: 36 ft / 11 m
- Coordinates: 34°36′19″S 135°52′49″E

Map
- Location in South Australia

Runways
Direction	Length		Surface
Direction	m	ft	Surface
01/19	1,499	4,918	Asphalt
05/23	1,275	4,183	Gravel
15/33	1,450	4,757	Gravel

Statistics (2010/11)
- Revenue passengers: 199,546
- Aircraft Movements: 7,316
- Sources: Australian AIP and aerodrome chart. Passenger and aircraft movements from the BITRE

Port Lincoln Airport (IATA: PLO, ICAO: YPLC) is an airport serving Port Lincoln, a city in the Australian state of South Australia. It is located 7 nautical miles (13 km; 8.1 mi) north of Port Lincoln, at North Shields. The airport is owned and operated by the District Council of Lower Eyre Peninsula. It was the second busiest airport in South Australia during 2009/10, with 168,147 passengers served.

== Facilities ==
The airport is at an elevation of 36 ft (11 m) above sea level. It has one asphalt paved runway designated 01/19 which measures 1,499 m × 30 m (4,918 ft × 98 ft) and two additional runways with gravel surfaces: 05/23 measuring 1,275 m × 30 m (4,183 ft × 98 ft) and 15/33 measuring 1,450 m × 30 m (4,757 ft × 98 ft). On 6 August 2013 a brand new airport terminal was officially opened, it cost $13.2 million.

== Airlines and destinations ==
Airlines	Destinations
QantasLink	Adelaide
Rex Airlines	Adelaide

== Statistics ==
Port Lincoln Airport was ranked 37th in Australia for the number of revenue passengers served in financial year 2016–2017.

Annual passenger and aircraft statistics for Port Lincoln
Year	Revenue passengers	Aircraft movements
2001-02	88,293(▼10.9%)	5,952(▲1.7)
2002-03	93,894(▲6.3%)	5,943(▼0.2%)
2003-04	110,649(▲17.8%)	6,664(▲12.1%)
2004-05	130,429(▲17.9%)	6,669(▲0.1%)
2005-06	138,547(▲6.2%)	6,175(▼7.4%)
2006-07	138,844(▲0.2%)	5,220(▼15.5%)
2007-08	149,544(▲7.7%)	5,815(▲11.4%)
2008-09	148,435(▼0.7%)	5,999(▲3.2%)
2009-10	168,147(▲13.3%)	6,803(▲13.4%)
2010-11	199,546(▲18.7%)	7,316(▲7.5%)
2011-12	193,535(▼3.0%)	7,133(▼2.5%)
2012-13	195,919(▲1.2%)	6,974(▼2.2%)
2013-14	187,702(▼4.2%)	7,032(▲0.8%)
2014-15	190,853(▲1.6%)	7,166(▲1.9%)
2015-16	182,331(▼4.5%)	7,491(▲4.5%)
2016-17	175,162(▼4.1%)	7,415(▼1.0%)

== See also ==
- List of airports in South Australia
