= Adelaide Airport =

Airport in Adelaide, South Australia

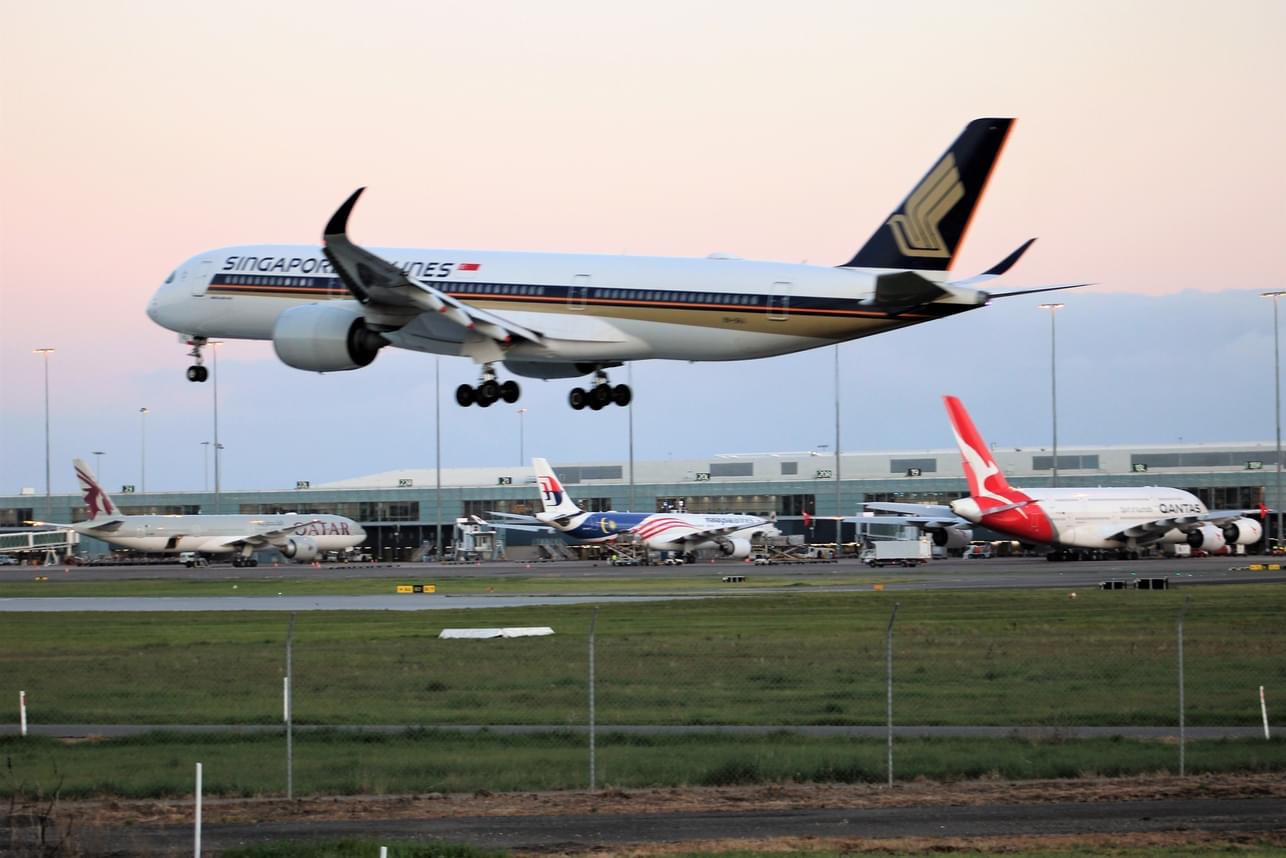
- Singapore Airlines Airbus A350-900 landing in front of the main terminal (Qatar Airways, Malaysia Airlines, and Qantas aircraft in background)
- IATA: ADL; ICAO: YPAD; WMO: 94672

Summary
- Airport type: Public
- Owner: UniSuper (51%); Hostplus (15%); IFM Investors (15%); Igneo Infrastructure Partners (15%); Perron Group (4%)
- Operator: Adelaide Airport Limited
- Serves: Greater Adelaide
- Location: Adelaide Airport, South Australia, Australia
- Opened: 16 February 1955; 71 years ago
- Hub for: ASL Airlines Australia; Virgin Australia
- Focus city for: Qantas
- Operating base for: Alliance Airlines; Jetstar; QantasLink; Rex Airlines; Royal Flying Doctor Service; National Jet Express; Sharp Airlines
- Elevation AMSL: 20 ft (6.1 m)
- Coordinates: 34°56′42″S 138°31′50″E
- Website: adelaideairport.com.au

Map
- Interactive map of Adelaide Airport

Runways
Direction	Length		Surface
Direction	m	ft	Surface
05/23	3,100	10,171	Asphalt
12/30	1,652	5,420	Asphalt

Statistics (FY26)
- Passengers: 9,154,558
- Movements: 103,876
- Freight (Tonnes): 6,500
- Sources: Adelaide Airport Ltd - Corporate

Adelaide Airport (IATA: ADL, ICAO: YPAD) is an international, domestic and general aviation airport serving the metropolitan area of Adelaide, South Australia, Australia. Located approximately 6 km (4 mi) west of the central business district, the airport served more than 9.1 million passengers in FY26, being Australia’s fifth-busiest airport by passenger movements. It has been operated privately by Adelaide Airport Limited under a long-term lease from the federal government since 29 May 1998.

First established in 1955, Adelaide Airport operates flights to over 30 destinations within Australia, Oceania, Asia, and North America. The airport also serves as a hub for Virgin Australia, a focus city for Qantas, and as an operating base for various airlines, including low-cost airline Jetstar. Adelaide Airport handles the fourth-largest number of domestic connections following Brisbane, Sydney and Melbourne airports. Since 2005, flights have been operated through a combined domestic and international terminal, having replaced the original separate terminals. Adelaide Airport is capable of handling large aircraft such as the Airbus A380 and Boeing 747, the latter of which was a regular at the airport in previous years.

The facility handles an average of over 250 flights daily, and spans a total area of 785 hectares (1,940 acres) of airport property.

== History ==
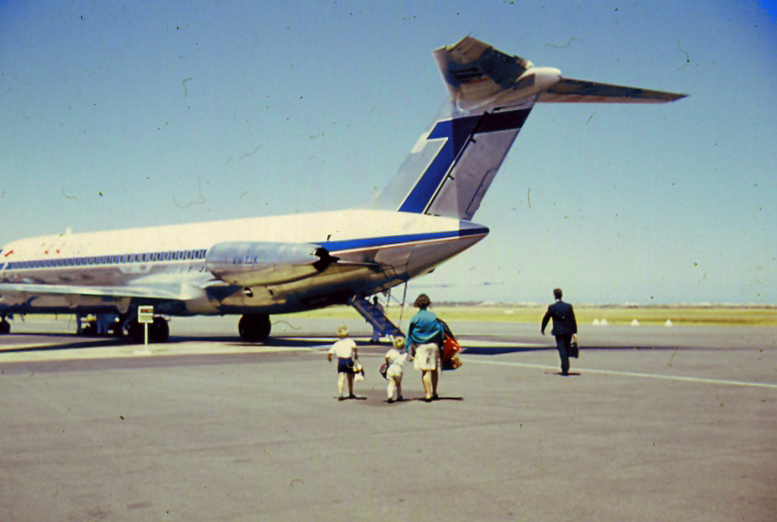
Passengers boarding from the tarmac in December 1967

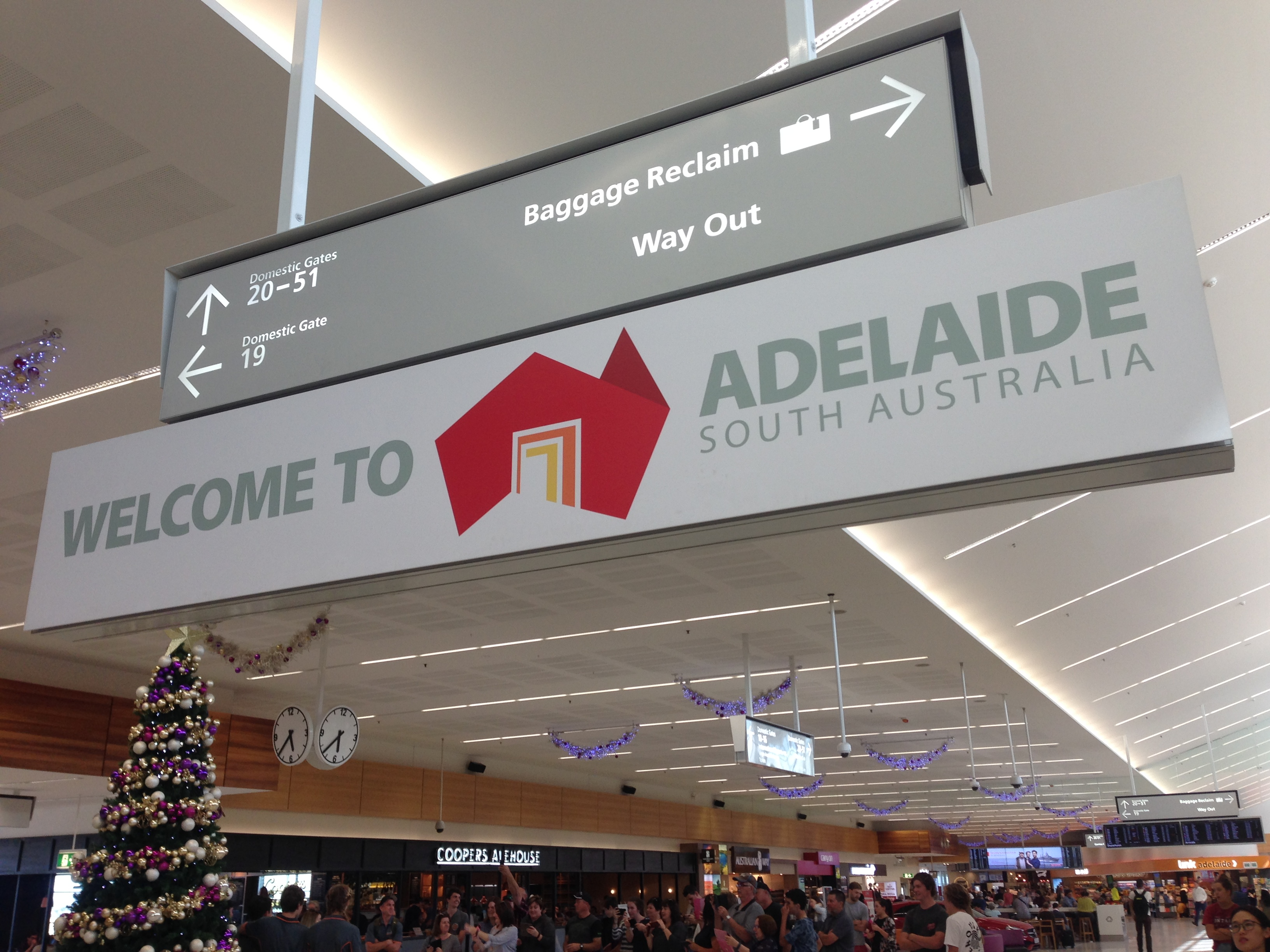
Welcome sign inside the airport

An early Adelaide airport was built in 1921, allowing a mail service between Adelaide and Sydney. The aerodrome was built on 24 ha (59 acres) of land in Albert Park, now part of the neighbouring suburb of Hendon, which took over from the Northfield Aerodrome. The demand on aviation soon grew substantially, with Parafield Airport being developed in 1927 to enable the first passenger airline services from Adelaide. With a further growth in aviation, a new site for the current Adelaide Airport was selected in the suburb of West Beach in January 1946, which was then split to form the dedicated Adelaide Airport suburb in 1991. An alternative airport site was also considered in Port Adelaide, which included a seaplane facility, but was considered inferior and too far from the central business district at roughly 14 kilometres (8.7 miles) away.

Construction in the chosen site took place in 1947 and flights commenced in 1954, with Parafield Airport being turned into a private and military aviation facility, now operating as a public training airport. With regular transport operations commencing on 16 February 1955, an annexe to one of the large hangars at the airport served as the first passenger terminal, until the Federal Government provided funds for the construction of a temporary building.

In 1982, a contract was awarded to Baulderstone to prepare the airport for wide bodied aircraft service, jets in particular being the Airbus A300 and Boeing 767 aircraft which would open the door to long-haul services.

In May 1998, long-term leases of Adelaide Airport and Parafield Airport were sold by Federal Airports Corporation to Adelaide Airport Limited, a consortium of Manchester Airport, Serco, UniSuper, and Macquarie Bank. As at December 2023, the shareholders of Adelaide Airport Limited were UniSuper (51%), Hostplus (15%), IFM Investors (15%), Igneo Infrastructure Partners (15%) and Perron Group (4%).

In July 1998, the runway was extended by 570 metres to 3.1 kilometres. Prior to the 2005 terminal redevelopment, the original separate terminals had only two aircraft bays and a single jetbridge with limited space for passengers, check-in desks were also small and waiting space was limited. A new control tower was also built west of the terminal, with the old control tower maintained for additional operations.

In October 2006, the new terminal was named the Capital City Airport of the Year at the Australian Aviation Industry Awards in Cairns. In March 2007, Adelaide Airport was rated the world's second-best airport in the 5–15 million passengers category at the Airports Council International 2006 awards.

Following the successful terminal redevelopment, plans were announced for another expansion of the terminal in July 2007, including the addition of more aerobridges as well as demolition of the old international terminal building. However, the demolition was delayed until November 2016 and was finally concluded in April 2018, this would make way for expanded landside facilities as well as further future expansions of the main terminal.

On 5 August 2008 Tigerair Australia confirmed that Adelaide Airport would become the airline's second hub which would base two of the airline's Airbus A320s by early 2009, this was followed by a third A320 in early 2010. In 2011, Tigerair announced it would shut down its operations from Adelaide and Avalon following the airlines 2011 suspension and reduction in flights.

In 2011, Adelaide Airport encountered major problems during the eruption of Puyehue volcano in Chile, with the ash cloud caused by the volcano resulting in flight cancellations nationwide, this left over 40,000 passengers stranded in Adelaide.

On 11 October 2022, it was discovered that at around 10am local time, security screening equipment had failed half an hour earlier, leading to the evacuation of the terminal and re-screening of approximately 2,000 passengers.

On 2 September 2025, Jetstar based another Airbus A320ceo at Adelaide Airport to support an increase in services, boosting the total number of aircraft based at the airport to six.

== International history ==
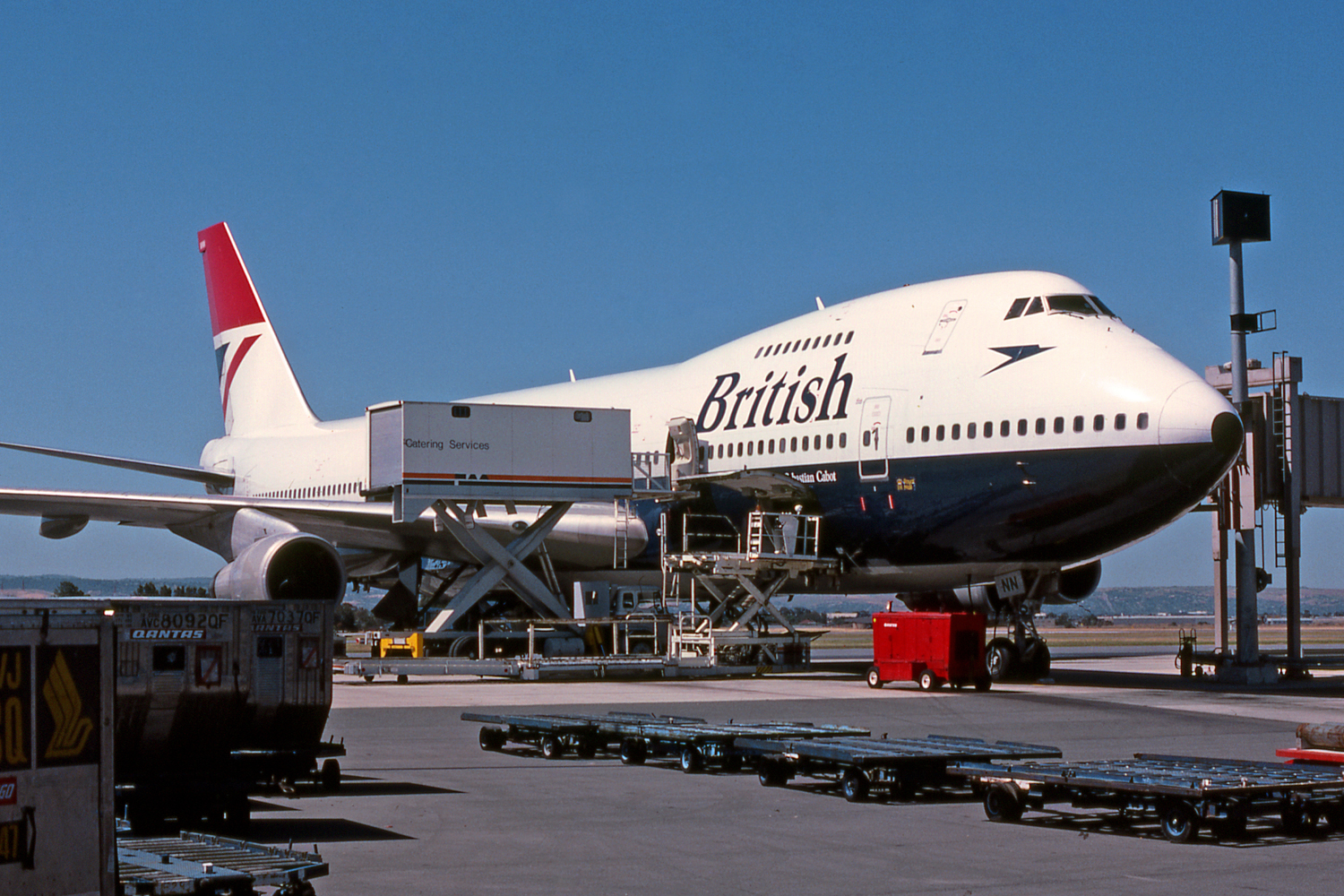
British Airways Boeing 747-100 at Adelaide Airport in November 1984

International services became regular after the November 1982 completion of an international terminal, with a Qantas Boeing 747-200B making the first international arrival from London via Singapore. Singapore Airlines and British Airways were the first foreign airlines to offer scheduled services at Adelaide Airport, also directly connecting the airport to Singapore and London respectively.

Alongside Singapore, Qantas had also previously operated non-stop services from Adelaide to Tokyo and Auckland in previous decades, with the latter now resuming as a seasonal service. A further number of international airlines such as Cathay Pacific, Malaysia Airlines, Garuda Indonesia, and Air New Zealand had also commenced services to Adelaide in the following years, adding further connectivity to Asia as well as to the Pacific.

On 5 June 2009, Pacific Blue, since consolidated into Virgin Australia, launched services from Adelaide to Nadi, but were eventually discontinued. Fiji Airways reconnected Adelaide and Nadi in June 2017 with a Boeing 737-800 operated service introduced.

On 31 October 2013, budget carrier AirAsia X began flights between Adelaide and Kuala Lumpur with Airbus A330-300s. The service was withdrawn in January 2015, though Indonesia AirAsia, another subsidiary of AirAsia, commenced services between Adelaide and Denpasar in June 2025. On 16 December 2013, Jetstar commenced services from Adelaide to Auckland using the Airbus A320-200s, similar to the original demise of the route from Qantas in July 2007, the route was later suspended in 2014.

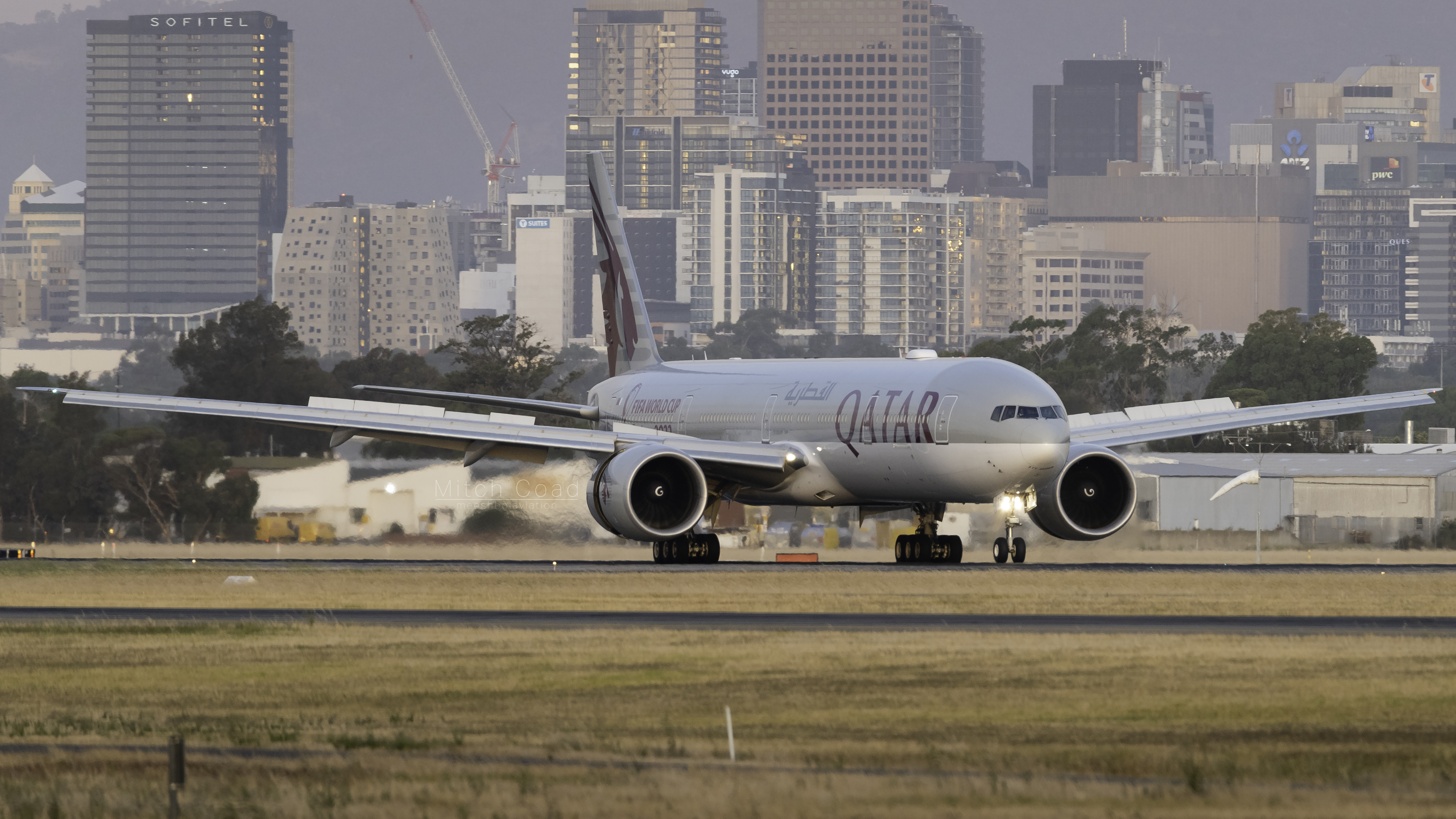
Qatar Airways Boeing 777-300ER in January 2023

In the financial year ending 30 June 2018, it was reported that Adelaide Airport had handled over one million international passengers, marking a milestone. Factors that contributed to this strong increase included the introduction of Air New Zealand's Boeing 787-9 aircraft on the Adelaide to Auckland route in October 2017, as well as flight frequency increases from airlines such as China Southern Airlines and Qatar Airways.

During January 2018, Emirates CEO Tim Clark stated the airlines' intention to shift from the Boeing 777 to the Airbus A380 aircraft on their Dubai to Adelaide service.

On 18 December 2018, Singapore Airlines upgraded its Singapore to Adelaide service from the Airbus A330-300 to the higher-capacity Airbus A350-900, being the inaugural destination with the new aircraft. Fiji Airways also upgraded to the Boeing 737 MAX aircraft on the Nadi to Adelaide route, and Singapore Airlines upgraded to the larger Boeing 787-10 Dreamliner aircraft by 2023.

In the second quarter of the 2019 financial year a 7% increase in international travel was recorded, in comparison with the same period last year. This was also partially fuelled by the late 2018 and early 2019 service increases from airlines such as China Southern Airlines, Cathay Pacific and Malaysia Airlines, accommodating the increase in demand. Adelaide Airport also continues to experience the greatest international growth out of any Australian airport.

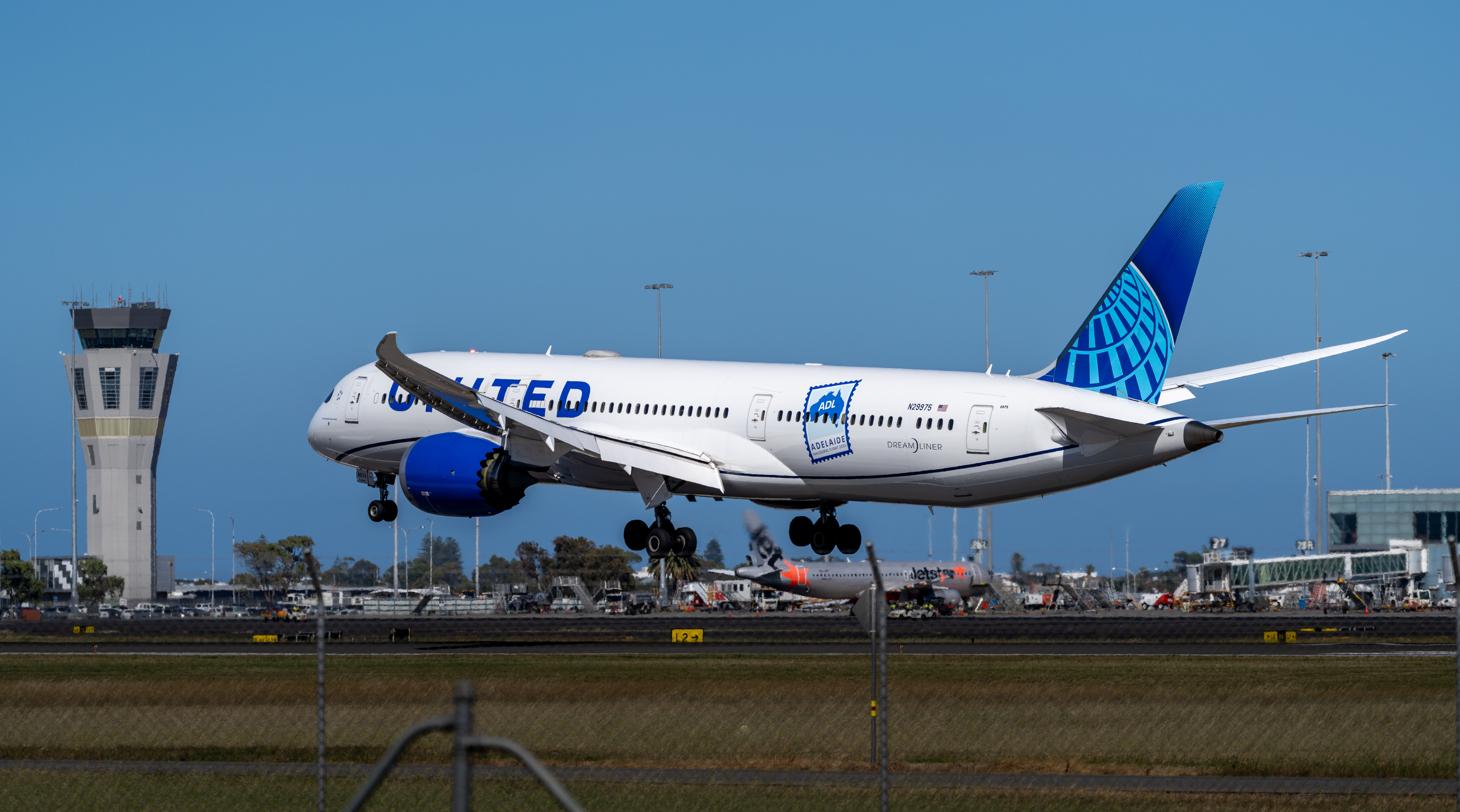
United Airlines Boeing 787-9 in December 2025

In December 2021, Qantas launched a temporary non-stop service from Adelaide to New Delhi, due to a shortage of Boeing 787 aircraft at the time. This was the first time Qantas had flown a non-stop international flight from Adelaide since the discontinuation of their Singapore to Adelaide route in 2013. Multiple repatriation flights to the city took place amidst the COVID-19 pandemic, these flights include Air India which flew one of its Boeing 787s from New Delhi, as well as Lion Air whom also flew from other Indian cities via Jakarta.

In October 2023, Adelaide Airport released its 2050 Network Vision, in which the airport hopes to have direct flight connection to 39 global cities, with some notable destinations including Los Angeles and Johannesburg, as well as the return of London among others. In order to achieve this, the airport is planning a significant expansion of its current facilities to cater for more international flights.

In October 2024, Emirates resumed its non-stop route between Dubai and Adelaide, coming shortly after China Southern Airlines' announcement for the resumption of their non-stop route between Guangzhou and Adelaide. Both routes were initially launched in 2012 and 2016 respectively, but were temporarily ceased in 2020 due to the COVID-19 pandemic. Carriers such as Batik Air and VietJet Air had also previously terminated or suspended flights to Adelaide.

In December 2025, United Airlines commenced a non-stop route between Adelaide and San Francisco, establishing the first direct flight between South Australia and North America. The route became United's third longest flight and is within the top 30 longest flights globally, with a distance of 12,988 km (8,070 mi; 7,013 nmi).

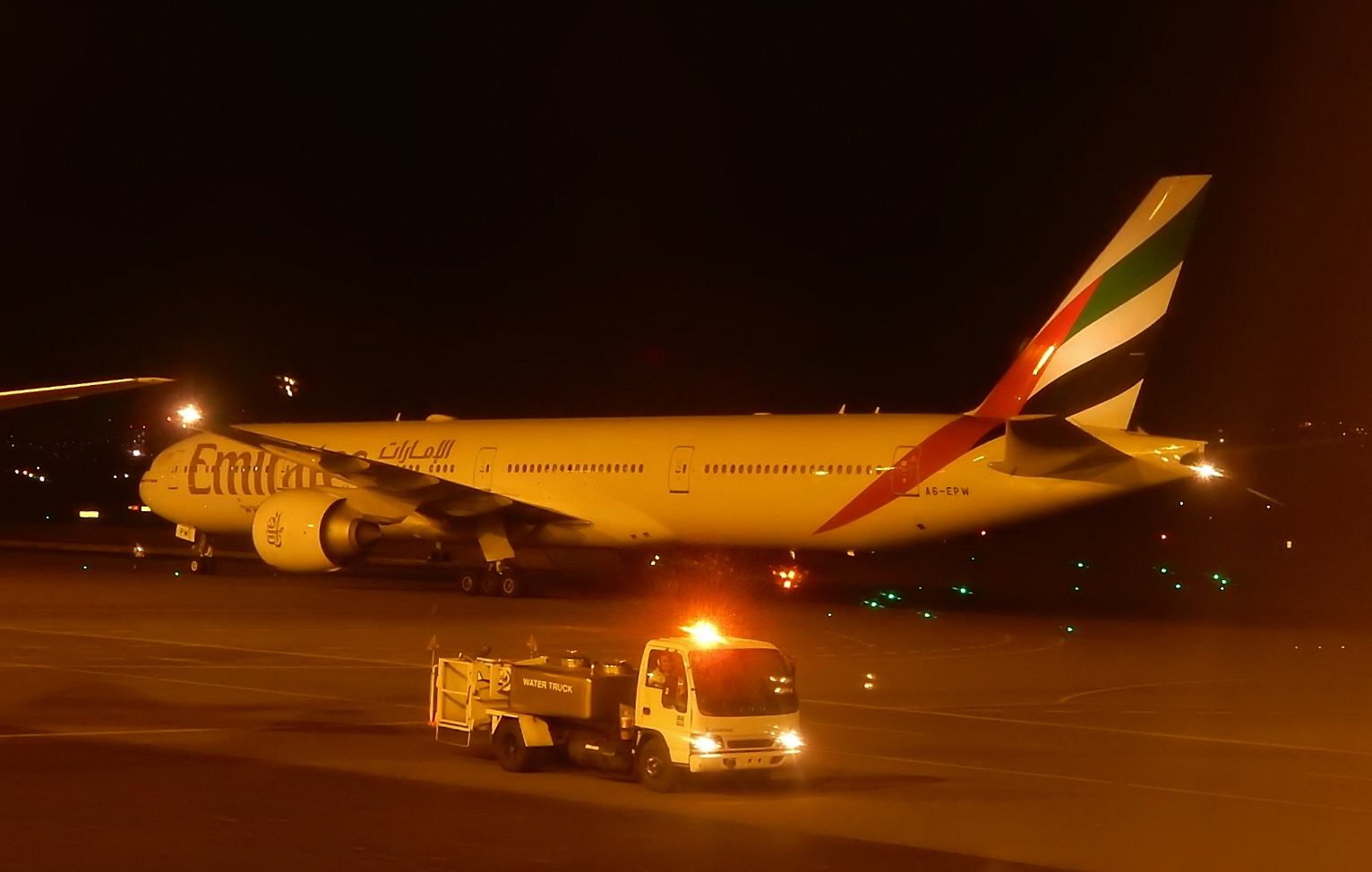
Emirates Boeing 777-300ER in April 2018

In May 2025, Qantas announced the resumption of their non-stop Auckland flights, marking the return of international flights to Adelaide from the carrier after a 12-year hiatus. Additionally, Cathay Pacific also reported the resumption of their popular Hong Kong service, which had originally been discontinued in 2021 due to the COVID-19 pandemic. The following month on 3 June 2025, Air New Zealand announced a new route to Christchurch, connecting South Australia to the South Island of New Zealand for the first time.

On 10 September 2025, it was reported that Malaysia Airlines would switch from the Airbus A330-300 aircraft to the brand-new A330-900 aircraft on their Kuala Lumpur to Adelaide route, introducing the Airbus A330neo variant for scheduled services to the city.

On 6 November 2025, China Eastern Airlines announced a new non-stop route connecting Adelaide to Shanghai, the busiest airport serving China as well as the third largest city globally. Operated with Airbus A350-900 aircraft and having began 20 June 2026, the route became Adelaide Airport's third Chinese destination.

January 2026 marked Adelaide Airport's busiest international month on record, handling over 128,000 passengers equating to a 21.6% year-on-year increase, being Australia's fastest growing international airport. This was driven by a rapid increase in capacity during 2025, with new services from Indonesia AirAsia and United Airlines, the resumption of Cathay Pacific and Qantas international services, as well as flight increases and additions from China Southern Airlines and Air New Zealand.

== Terminals ==
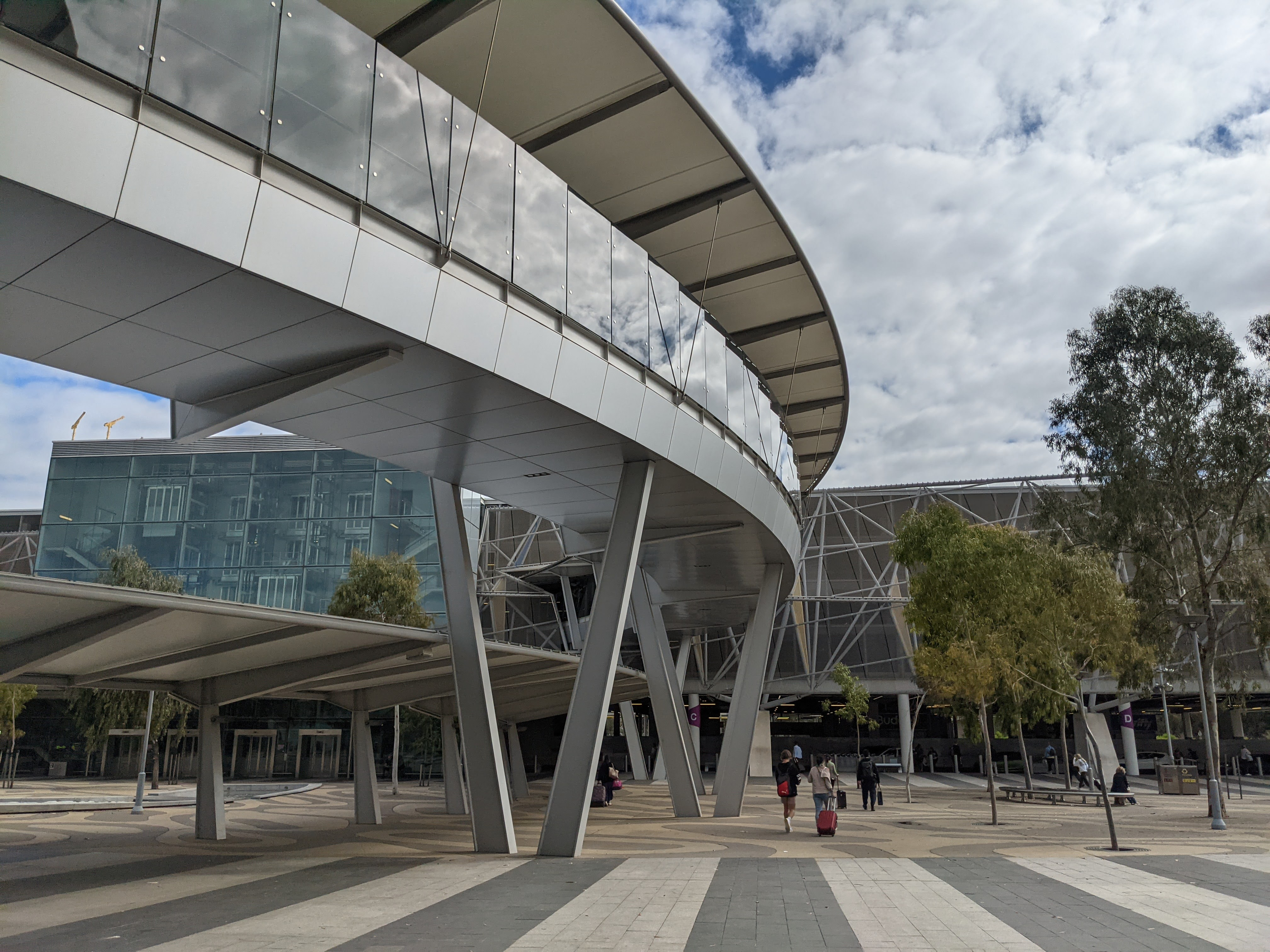
Exterior of the current terminal in 2021

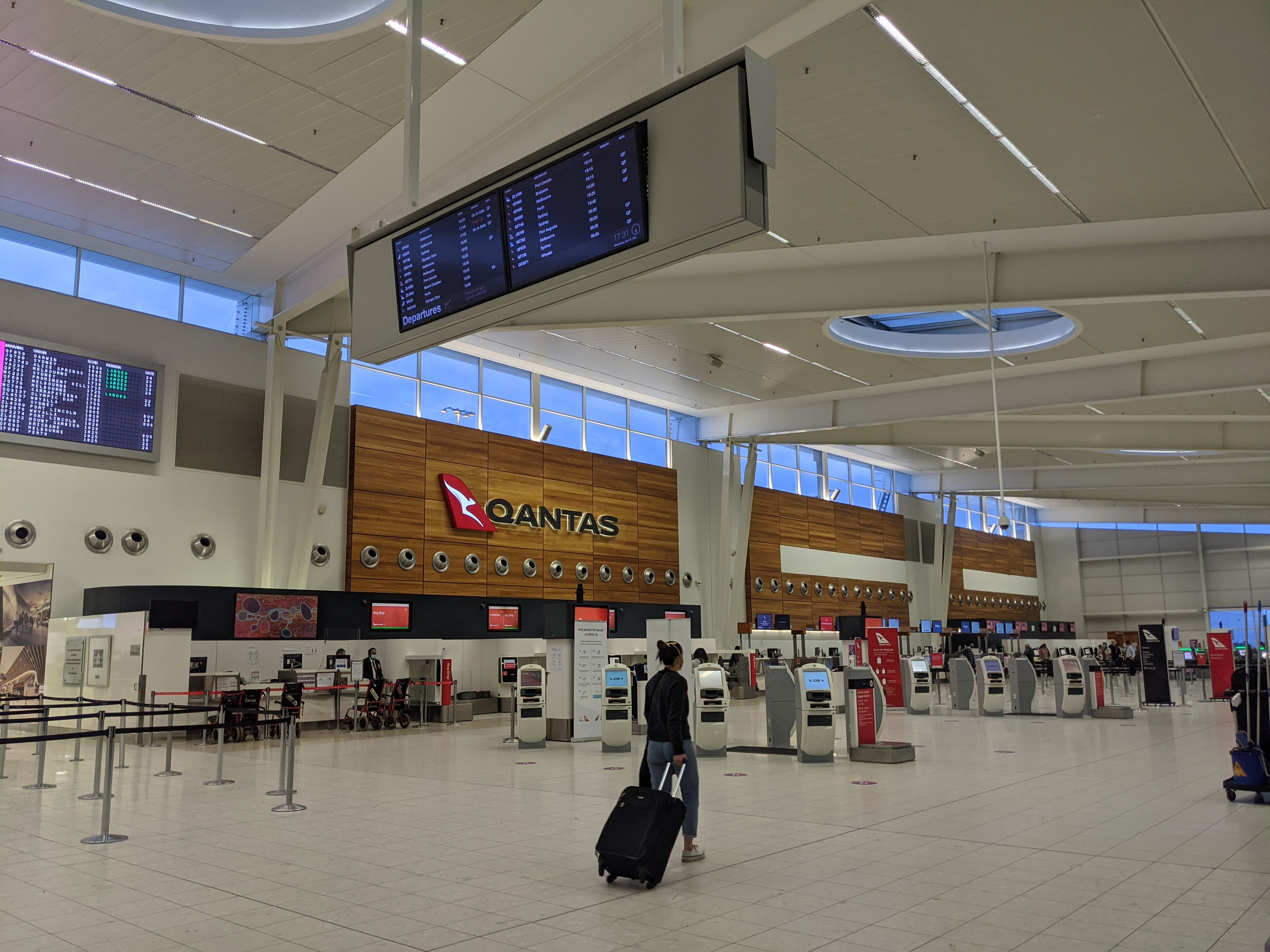
Check-in hall interior

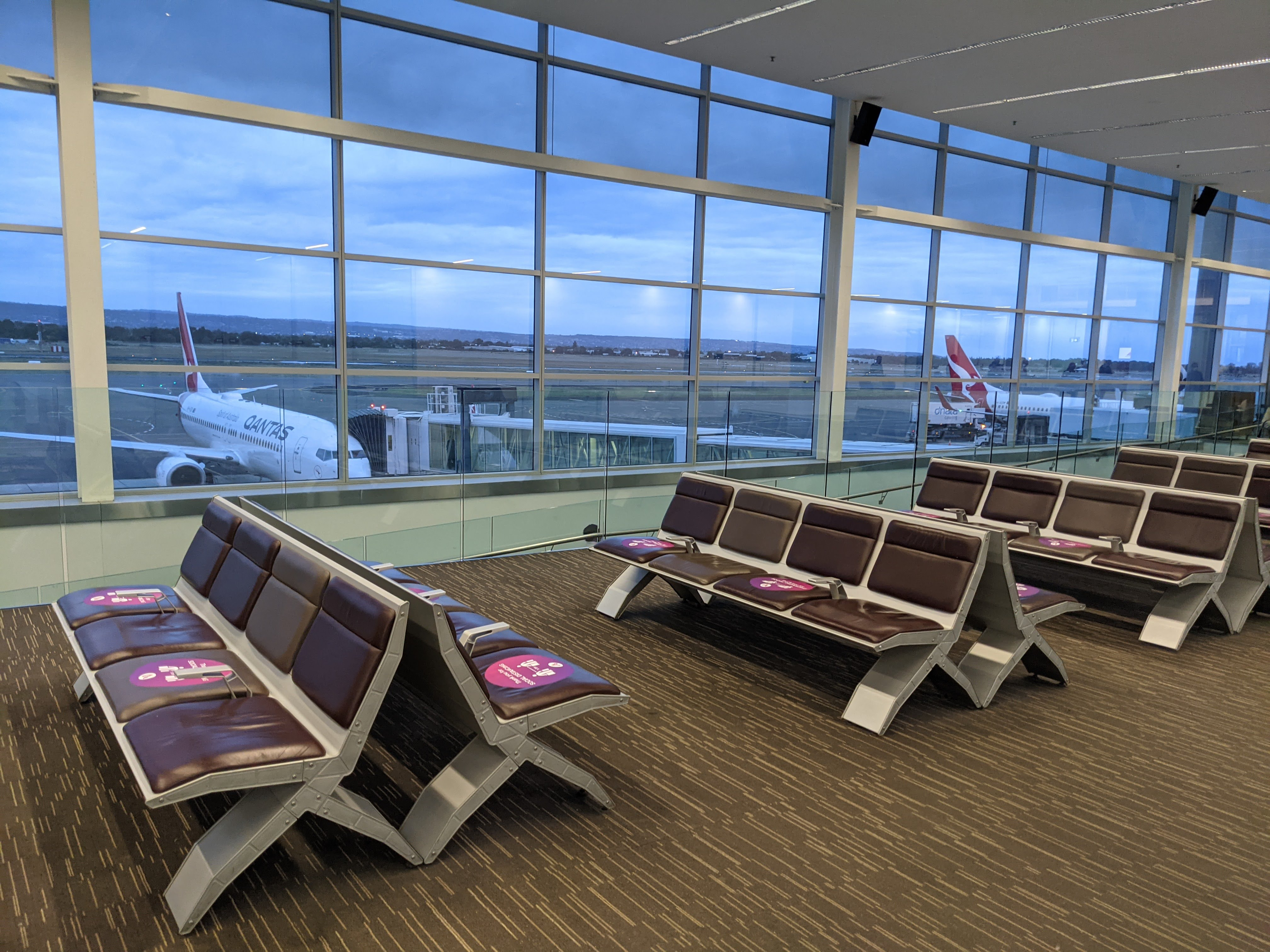
Airside waiting area

The current airport terminal redevelopment was opened on 8 October 2005, inaugurated by Prime Minister John Howard and South Australian Premier Mike Rann.

After the terminal had opened, Adelaide Airport Limited soon announced that only international flights would use the new facility immediately due to problems with the fuel pumps and underground pipes. These problems related initially to the anti-rusting agent applied to the insides of the fuel pumps, then to construction debris in the pipes. Although international and regional (from December 2005) aircraft were refuelled via tankers, a lack of space and safety concerns prevented this action for domestic jet aircraft, which instead continued operations at the old terminal. The refuelling system was cleared of all debris and the new terminal was eventually able to be used for domestic flights from 17 February 2006.

The mixed-use terminal includes several high-amenity airline lounges over two levels. Level one includes the Plaza Premium international lounge adjacent to the international security check-in, exclusively for international passengers. On level two, Virgin Australia and Rex Airlines operate lounges for domestic passengers. Qantas operate their signature Qantas Club lounge complex opposite gate 21 in the main terminal departure lounge. It is open to domestic and international business class Qantas passengers and Qantas Club membership holders, as well as business class passengers of partnered Oneworld alliance member airlines. As of 13 June 2024, a multi-million dollar refurbishment of the lounge complex is underway and capacity is restricted. As announced by Qantas in 2022, the new lounge complex will emerge as the Qantas Lounge Precinct, with the addition of a separate Qantas Business Lounge, along with the fully refurbished Qantas Club and Qantas Chairmans Lounge which will open in stages from late 2024. The Qantas Business Lounge will welcome its first passengers in mid-2025. The terminal check-in hall provides 42 common user check-in desks and 34 shop fronts. Free wireless Internet is also provided throughout the terminal by Internode Systems, a first for an Australian airport.

=== Project Flight ===
In August 2025, Adelaide Airport announced a $600 million infrastructure expansion plan with numerous upgrades and improvements for the airport. Dubbed 'Project Flight', the expansion will include the lengthening of the Northern and Southern terminal ends by 10,000 and 5,500 square metres respectively, gate lounge refurbishments, check-in hall additions, and an enlargement of the number of parking spaces. The terminal expansions will also notably include five more gates with additional aerobridges to capacitate the increase of international and domestic travel for the foreseeable future. With construction having begun in mid-2025, this large-scale project is anticipated to be completed in June 2028, being one of the largest expansions to the airport following the initial 2005 redevelopment.

== Facilities and developments ==
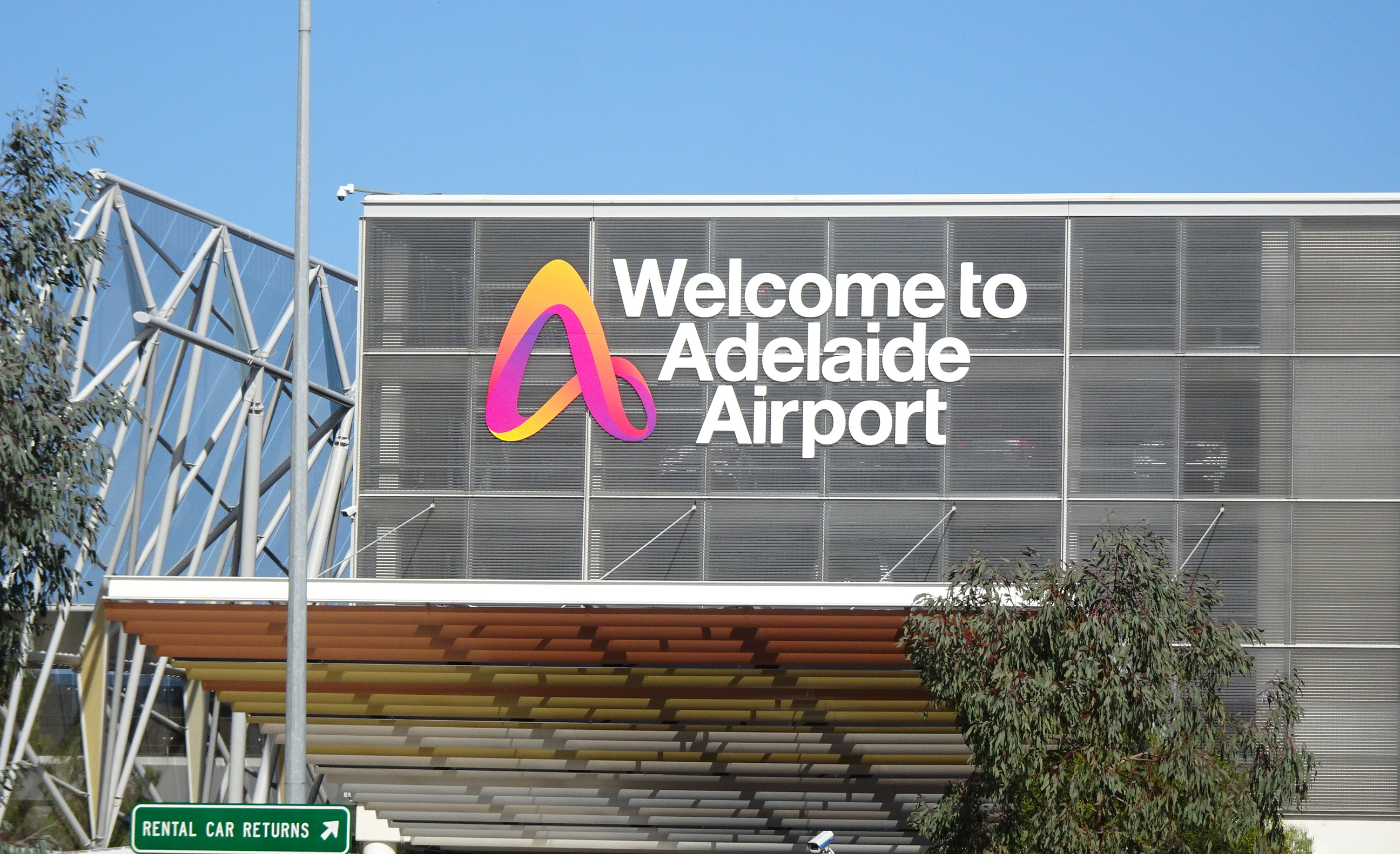
Car park above pick-up and drop-off zone

In February 2011, a $100 million building program was launched as part of a five-year master plan, including a new road network within the airport, a multi-storey car park, increasing short-term parking spaces from 800 to 1,650 (completed August 2012); a new plaza frontage for the passenger terminal (completed March 2013); a walkway bridge connecting new car park and existing terminal building (completed March 2013); terminal concourse extension; three new aerobridges; terminal commercial projects and passenger facilities; relocation of regional carrier Rex.

In July 2013, Adelaide Airport became the first Australian airport and second airport worldwide to have Google Street View technology, allowing passengers to explore the arrival and departure sections of the airport before travel.

A new control tower, at 44 metres (144 ft) high, more than twice the height of the old tower built in 1983 and costing A$16.9 million, was completed and commissioned in August 2013. This was followed by the approval of the Adelaide Airport Master Plan 2014, in January 2015, ratified by the Commonwealth Minister for Infrastructure and Regional Development.

In September 2016, a relocation and major upgrade was completed for the base of the central service region of the Royal Flying Doctor Service. The base houses many Pilatus PC-12 and one Pilatus PC-24, maintenance hangars and ambulance bays.

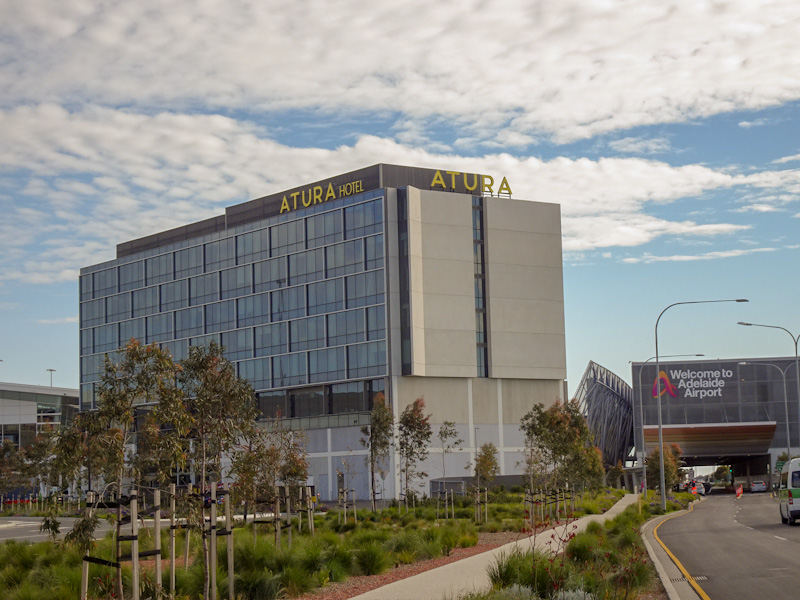
Atura Airport Hotel, pictured in 2019

Atura Adelaide Airport Hotel (37 m [121 ft] tall, nine levels) was completed in September 2018,

following the $165 million terminal expansion project in late 2018 and early 2019. The expansion was completed in 2021, increasing the length of the terminal, adding more duty-free and shopping outlets, and increasing international capacity. The old international terminal was also demolished in 2019, after lying empty for many years.

In early 2020, Adelaide Airport opened a newly updated concourse which was finished in December 2019, with new shops such as Airport Pharmacy, Boost Juice, Lego Kaboom, Penfolds Wine Bar & Kitchen, Precinct Adelaide Kitchen, and Soul Origin. In October 2023 it was announced that the Penfolds Wine Bar & Kitchen would close and be replaced with the ADL Grounds Bar.

=== Vickers Vimy museum ===
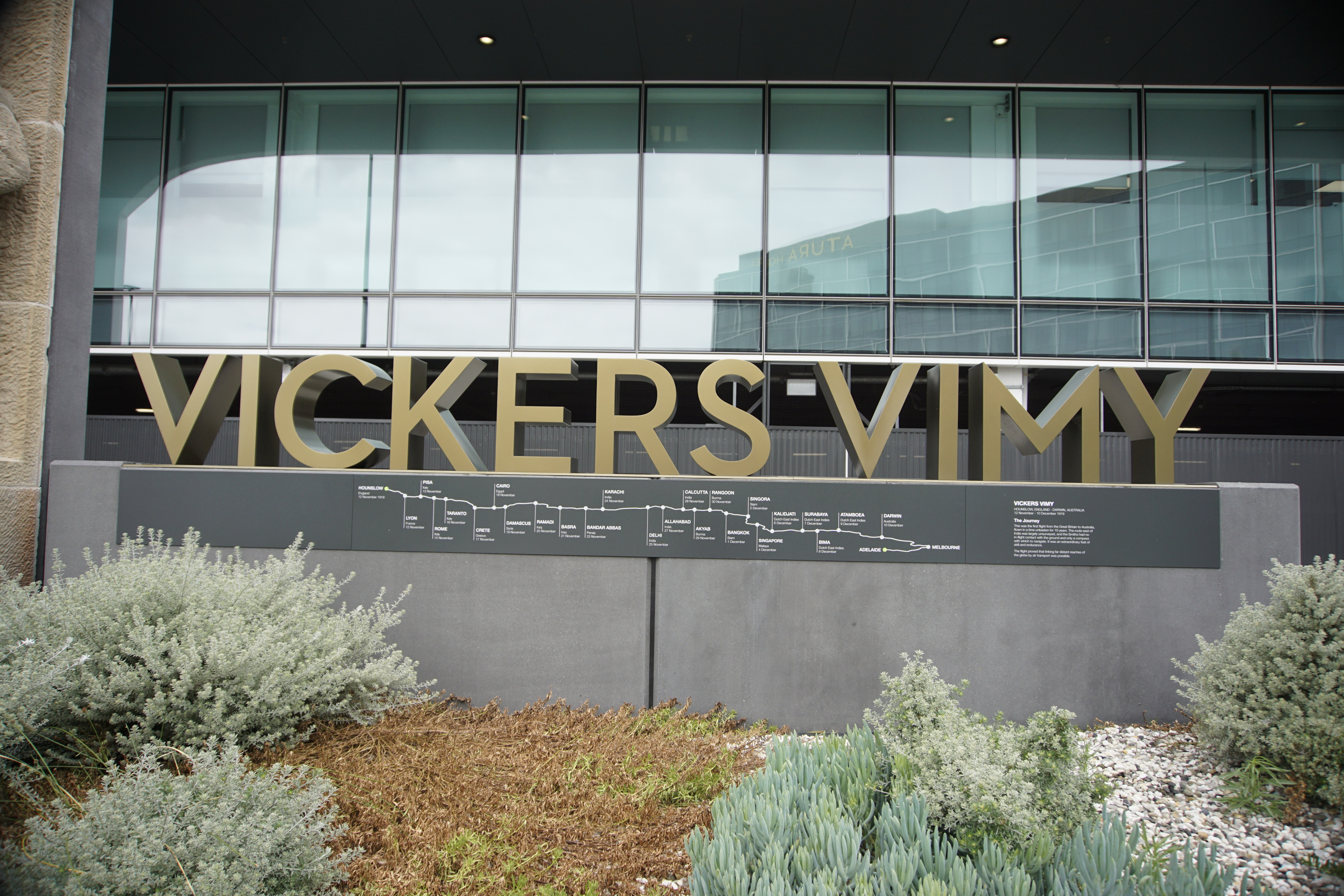
Exterior of the Vickers-Vimy museum, Adelaide Airport

In 1919, the Australian government offered £10,000 for the first All-Australian crew to fly an aeroplane from England to Australia. Adelaide brothers Keith Macpherson Smith and Ross Macpherson Smith, along with mechanics Jim Bennett and Wally Shiers, completed the journey from Hounslow Heath Aerodrome to Darwin via Singapore and Batavia on 10 December 1919. Their Vickers Vimy aircraft, affectionately known as "God 'Elp All Of Us", is preserved in a purpose-built climate-controlled museum inside the grounds of the airport at 34°56′29.2″S 138°31′59.5″E. Due to relocation of the terminal buildings, the museum is now situated inside the long-term car park. In 2019, the state and federal government committed $2 million each towards a new preservation facility inside the airport's $165 million terminal expansion.

=== Lucerne to cool runways ===
A world-first project that lowers runway temperatures by growing commercial crops irrigated by recycled water was trialled at Adelaide Airport, with the first trial completed in 2019. By planting 4 hectares (9.9 acres) of various crops and testing the effects of each on runway temperature, SA Water scientists found that lucerne was most successful, leading to a reduction of an average 3 °C in average ambient air temperatures on warm days, in and around the irrigation areas. Not only was the lucerne the best performer compared with tall fescue, couch grass and kikuyu, but it can also be cut into hay and sold as stock feed. The plant growth habit of lucerne also lends itself to deter birds, with research suggesting "if you have a nice thick crop of lucerne over the top of the soil [the birds] can't actually get to the soil and the movement of the crop in the wind also spooks them." Preliminary trial results suggest that lucerne treatments saw no increase in bird species. The Airport is creating a business case to extend the project to cover 200 hectares (490 acres) of airport land.

== Airlines and destinations ==
=== Passenger ===
Airlines	Destinations
Air New Zealand	Auckland; Seasonal: Christchurch
Alliance Airlines	Olympic Dam; Charter: Ballera, Moomba
Cathay Pacific	Seasonal: Hong Kong
China Eastern Airlines	Seasonal: Shanghai–Pudong
China Southern Airlines	Guangzhou
Emirates	Dubai–International
Fiji Airways	Nadi
Jetstar	Avalon, Brisbane, Cairns, Darwin, Denpasar, Gold Coast, Hobart, Melbourne, Perth, Sunshine Coast, Sydney–Kingsford Smith; Seasonal: Proserpine
Malaysia Airlines	Kuala Lumpur–International
National Jet Express	Charter: Carrapateena, Port Augusta, Prominent Hill
Pel-Air	Charter: Jacinth-Ambrosia Mine
Qantas	Melbourne, Perth, Sydney–Kingsford Smith; Seasonal: Auckland
QantasLink	Alice Springs, Brisbane, Canberra, Darwin, Kingscote/Kangaroo Island, Melbourne, Newcastle, Port Lincoln, Whyalla
Qatar Airways	Auckland (ends 8 December 2026), Doha
Rex Airlines	Broken Hill, Ceduna, Coober Pedy, Mount Gambier, Port Lincoln
Singapore Airlines	Singapore
United Airlines	Seasonal: San Francisco
Virgin Australia	Alice Springs, Brisbane, Canberra, Gold Coast, Hobart, Melbourne, Perth, Sydney–Kingsford Smith; Seasonal: Launceston; Charter: Olympic Dam
Virgin Australia Regional Airlines	Perth

Qantas formerly operated dedicated "flightseeing" services over Antarctica from Adelaide with the Boeing 787-9 Dreamliner. These 13-hour flights departed Adelaide from the domestic terminal and provided a guided aerial tour of Antarctica before returning to Australia, having previously been flown with the Boeing 747-400.

=== Cargo ===
Airlines with scheduled freighter aircraft, excluding freight services provided by passenger aircraft or connecting truck services to other airports.

Airlines	Destinations
Qantas Freight	Melbourne, Perth, Sydney–Kingsford Smith, Sydney–Western
Toll Group	Canberra, Melbourne, Perth, Sydney–Kingsford Smith

== Traffic and statistics ==
=== Total annual passengers ===
Adelaide Airport handles over 250 arrivals and departures per day on average, with over 25,000 passengers passing through the terminals on a daily basis.

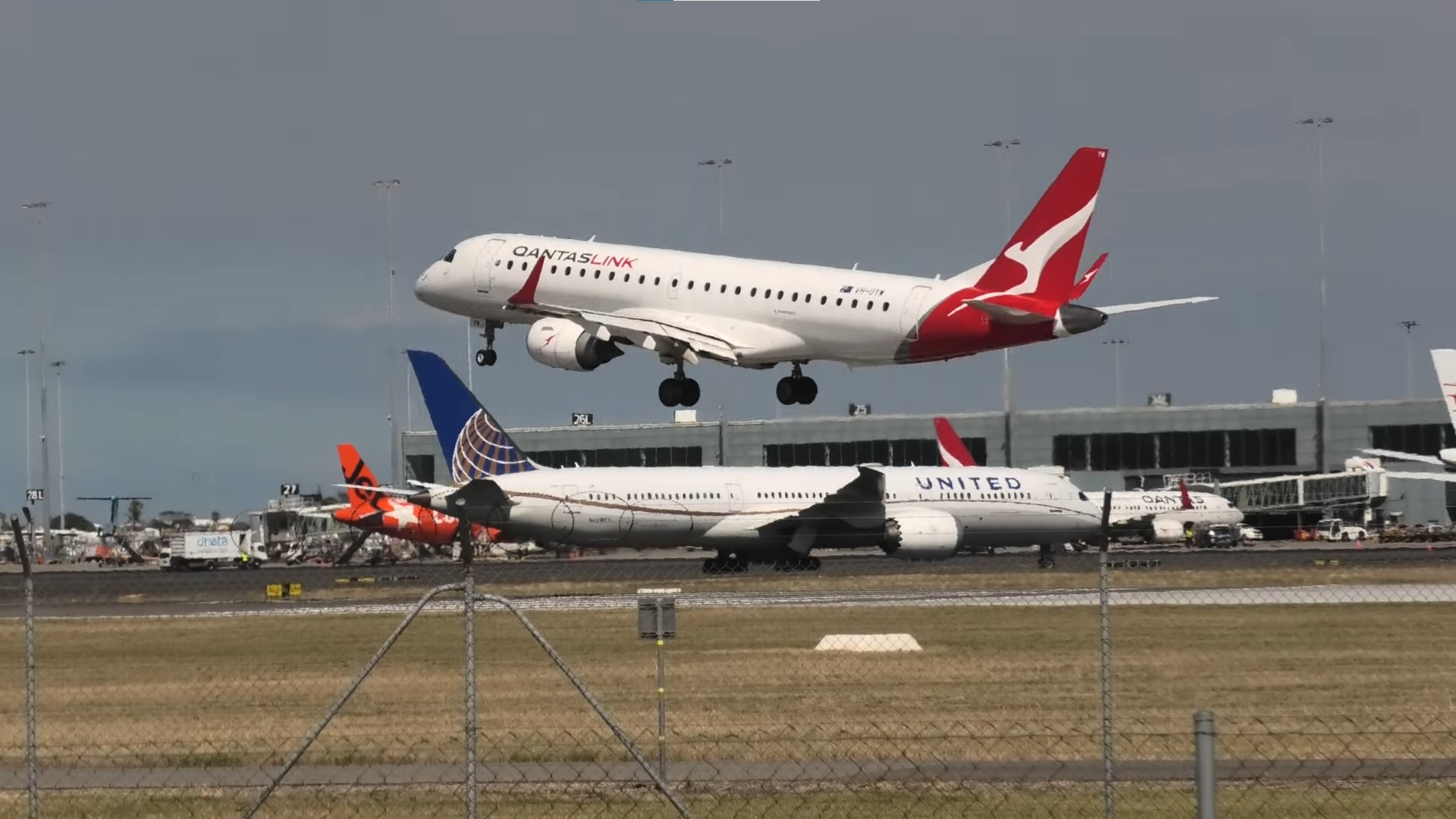
QantasLink Embraer E190 landing at Adelaide Airport, United Airlines Boeing 787-9 taxiing in background

Annual passenger statistics for Adelaide Airport
Year	Domestic	International	Total	Change
1985	1,911,747	108,034	2,019,781	Steady
1986	1,978,433	136,571	2,115,004	▲4.7%
1987	2,008,843	139,692	2,148,535	▲1.6%
1988	2,164,254	140,884	2,305,135	▲7.3%
1989	1,735,052	147,178	1,882,230	▼ -18.3%
1990	2,107,846	181,397	2,289,243	▲21.6%
1991	2,630,016	192,094	2,822,100	▲23.3%
1992	2,729,855	204,463	2,934,318	▲4.0%
1993	2,909,895	216,419	3,126,314	▲6.5%
1994	3,174,750	214,356	3,389,106	▲8.4%
1995	3,419,694	207,621	3,627,315	▲7.0%
1996	3,559,829	205,863	3,765,692	▲3.8%
1997	3,636,402	208,890	3,845,292	▲2.1%
1998	3,789,458	223,035	4,012,493	▲4.3%
1999	3,860,910	241,014	4,101,924	▲2.2%
2000	3,963,159	270,099	4,233,258	▲3.2%
2001	4,182,480	241,844	4,424,324	▲4.5%
2002	3,994,310	224,351	4,218,661	▼ -4.6%
2003	4,384,095	206,849	4,590,944	▲8.8%
2004	4,839,885	286,083	5,125,968	▲11.7%
2005	5,261,677	334,298	5,595,975	▲9.2%
2006	5,592,313	400,489	5,992,802	▲7.1%
2007	5,906,429	455,149	6,361,578	▲6.2%
2008	6,270,369	479,679	6,750,048	▲6.1%
2009	6,340,348	501,399	6,841,747	▲1.4%
2010	6,758,251	532,392	7,290,643	▲6.6%
2011	6,438,334	583,073	7,021,407	▼ -3.7%
2012	6,416,815	650,077	7,066,892	▲0.6%
2013	6,574,289	799,585	7,373,874	▲4.3%
2014	6,731,599	967,265	7,698,864	▲4.4%
2015	6,799,781	871,388	7,671,169	▼ -0.4%
2016	6,995,994	924,179	7,920,173	▲3.2%
2017	7,148,959	962,975	8,111,934	▲2.4%
2018	7,320,342	1,025,961	8,346,303	▲2.9%
2019	7,387,579	1,128,592	8,516,171	▲2.0%
2020	2,348,454	240,959	2,589,413	▼ -69.6%
2021	3,031,107	35,688	3,066,795	▲18.4%
2022	6,006,859	409,977	6,416,836	▲109.2%
2023	7,116,372	881,114	7,997,486	▲24.6%
2024	7,580,034	958,144	8,538,178	▲6.7%
2025	7,699,151	1,032,093	8,731,244	▲2.3%
2026	7,913,973	1,240,585	9,153,558	▲4.8%

=== Domestic ===
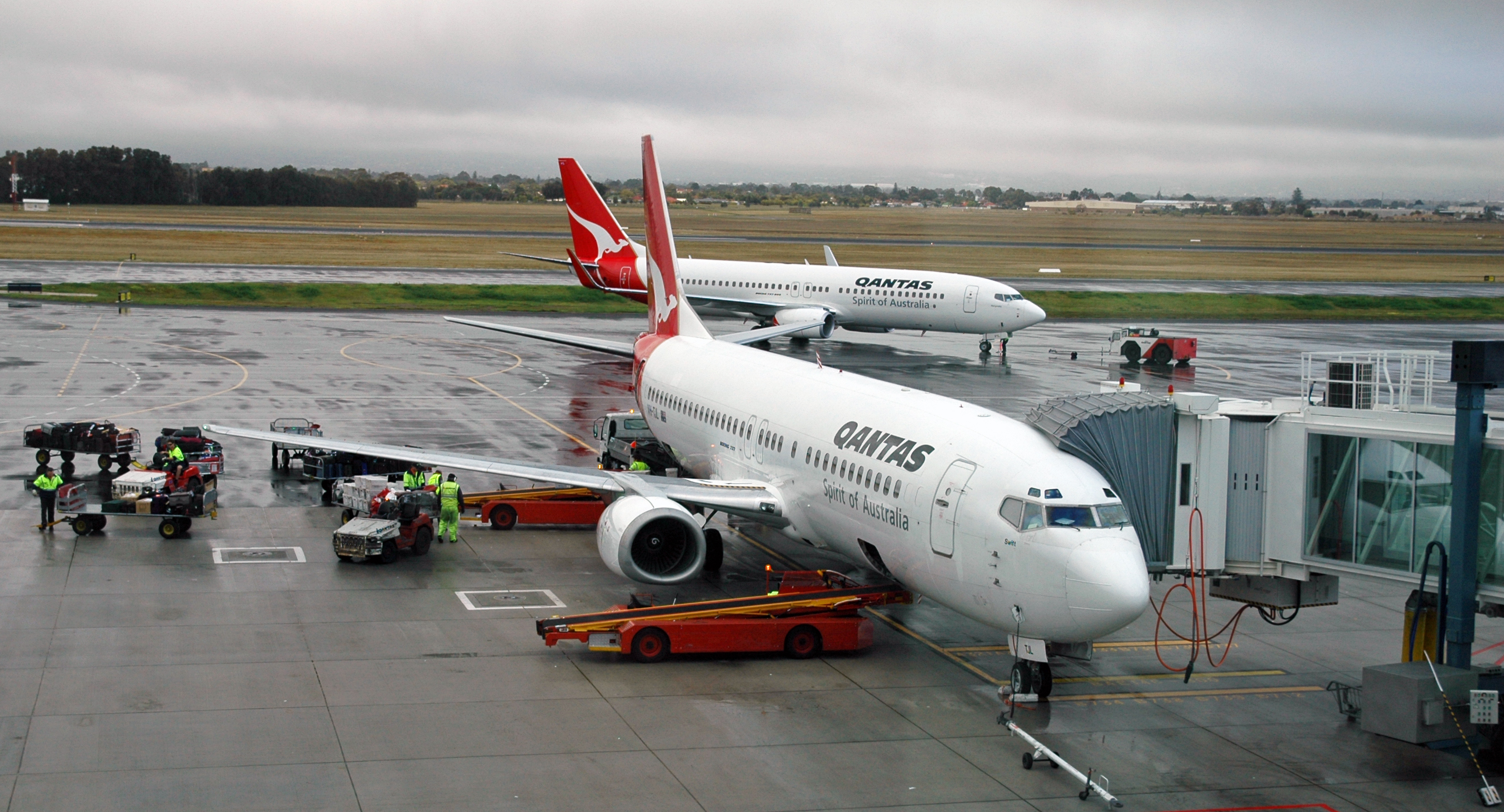
Qantas Boeing 737s on the newly developed terminal in 2006

Adelaide Airport handled 7.9 million domestic passengers in the year ending 30 June 2026 with a 2.8% increase from the previous year, handling the fourth-largest number of domestic interstate passengers in Australia.

Busiest domestic routes – Adelaide Airport (Year ending 30 June 2026)
Rank	Airport	Passengers	Change	Airlines
1	Melbourne	2,414,469	▲3.9%	Jetstar, Qantas, QantasLink, Virgin Australia
2	Sydney	1,903,383	▲0.7%	Jetstar, Qantas, Virgin Australia
3	Brisbane	907,632	▲5.1%	Jetstar, QantasLink, Virgin Australia
4	Perth	730,412	▲2.2%	Jetstar, National Jet Express, Qantas, Virgin Australia, Virgin Australia Regional Airlines
5	Gold Coast	294,898	▲5.0%	Jetstar, QantasLink, Virgin Australia
6	Canberra	195,209	▲1.2%	QantasLink, Virgin Australia
7	Port Lincoln	168,691	▲1.0%	QantasLink, Rex Airlines
8	Olympic Dam	103,265	▲0.6%	Alliance Airlines, Virgin Australia (Note: Began 14 July, 2026)
9	Alice Springs	102,465	▼ -2.7%	QantasLink, Virgin Australia
10	Whyalla	45,755	▲4.6%	QantasLink
11	Kingscote/Kangaroo Island	33,443	▲10.3%	QantasLink

=== International ===
Adelaide Airport handled a record 1.24 million international passengers in the 2025-26 financial year, marking an increase of 19.2% from the previous year. 2025 saw a significant expansion of many new international flights and post-Covid service resumptions to Adelaide, including the first non-stop commercial flight to San Francisco and Christchurch, the resumption of international flights from Qantas and restoration of all pre-COVID international services, as well as new flights announced to Shanghai.

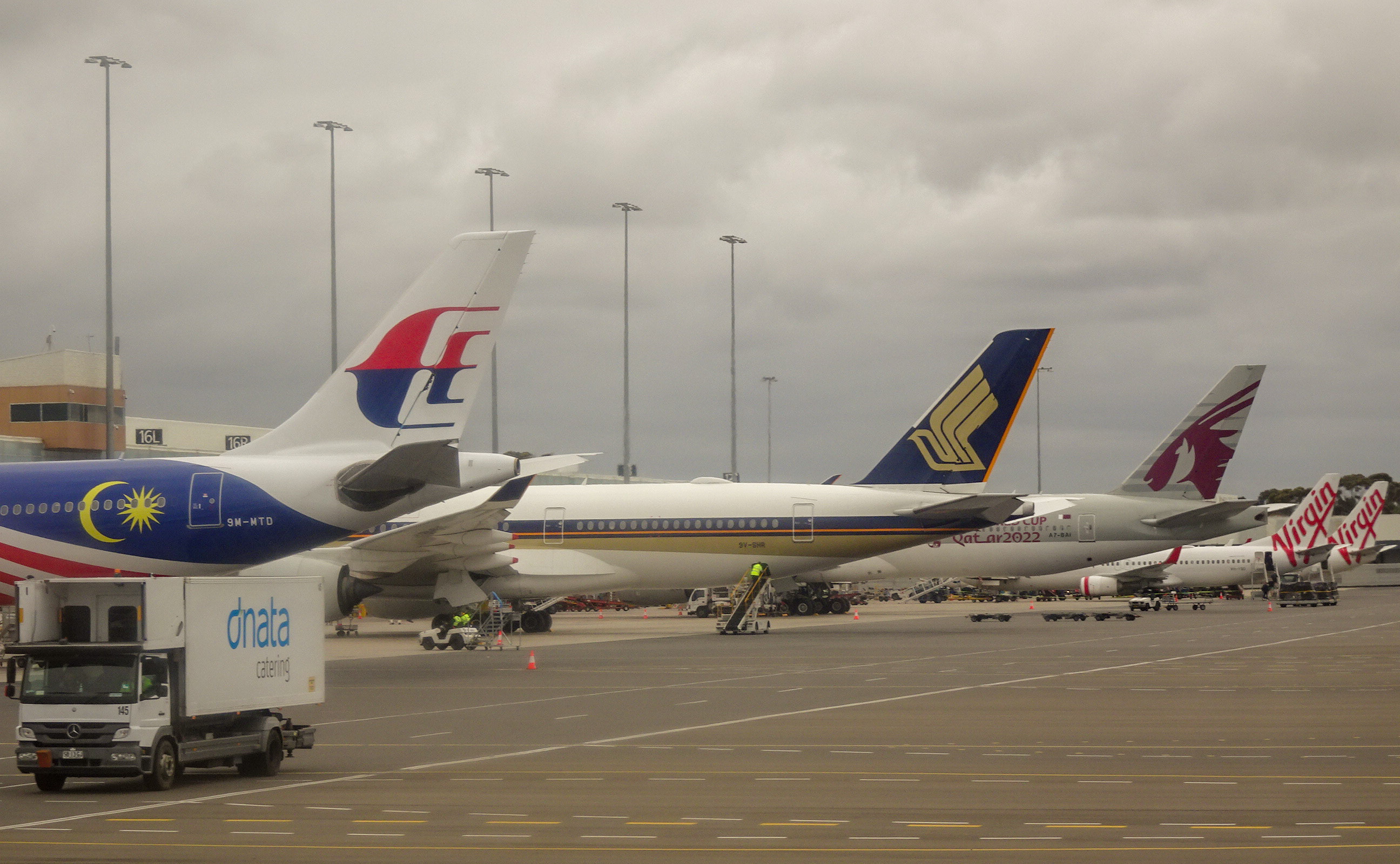
Morning international line-up at Adelaide Airport, including Malaysia Airlines A330-300, Singapore Airlines A350-900, and Qatar Airways 777-300ER

Busiest international routes – Adelaide Airport (Year ending 30 June 2026)
Rank	Airport	Passengers	Change	Airlines
1	Singapore	320,936	▲8.1%	Singapore Airlines
2	Denpasar	286,419	▲33.7%	Indonesia AirAsia, (Note: Services ended June 2026) Jetstar
3	Kuala Lumpur	164,572	▲22.0%	Malaysia Airlines
4	Doha	113,996	▼ -37.1%	Qatar Airways
5	Dubai (Note: Resumed in October 2024)	111,398	▲37.1%	Emirates
6	Auckland	94,215	▲41.0%	Air New Zealand, Qantas, (Note: Seasonal, resumed October 2025) Qatar Airways (Note: Resumed June 2026)
7	Guangzhou	37,317	▲122.4%	China Southern Airlines
8	Nadi	33,106	▲39.4%	Fiji Airways
9	Hong Kong (Note: Seasonal, resumed November 2025)	28,970	New entry	Cathay Pacific
10	Christchurch (Note: Seasonal, began November 2025)	14,548	New entry	Air New Zealand
11	San Francisco (Note: Seasonal, began December 2025)	12,062	New entry	United Airlines
12	Shanghai-Pudong (Note: Seasonal, began June 2026)	2,024	New entry	China Eastern Airlines

=== Freight statistics ===
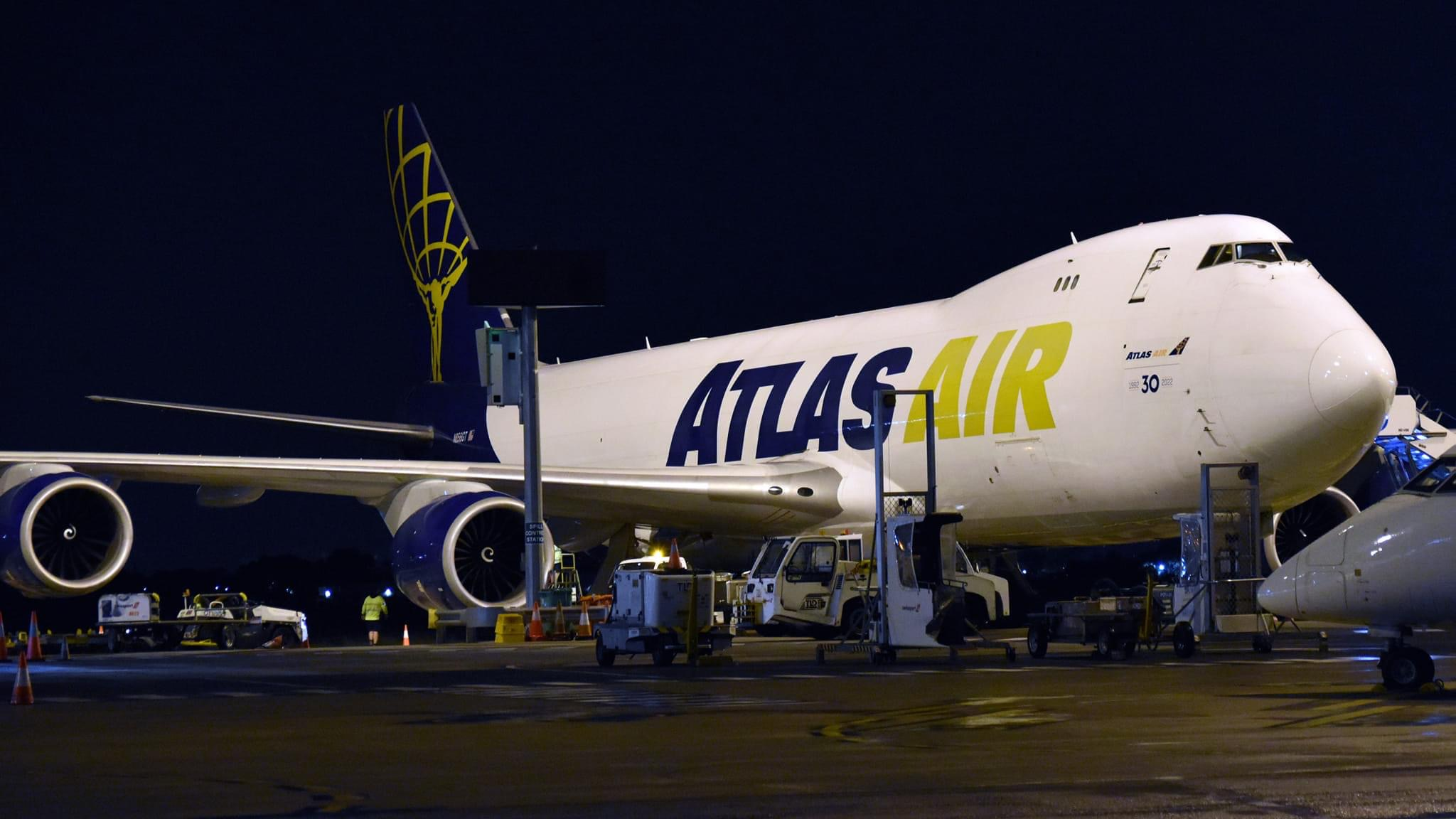
Antonov have Atlas Air freighters made various appearances at Adelaide Airport over the years, with 747F freighters being common in recent times.

Busiest international freight routes – Adelaide Airport (year ending 31 December 2025)
Rank	Airport	Tonnes	Change
1	Singapore	8,740.6	▲18.0%
2	Dubai	5,023.6	▲310.9%
3	Doha	4,103.0	▼ -34.4%
4	Kuala Lumpur	2,764.0	▲3.4%
5	Guangzhou	1,181.5	▲299.5%
6	Hong Kong	223.2	New entry
7	Denpasar	157.3	▲694.4%
8	Auckland	147.5	▲3.1%
9	San Francisco	66.8	New entry
10	Nadi	8.0	▲1.7%
11	Christchurch	3.7	New entry

International freight statistics for Adelaide Airport (tonnes)
Year	Inbound	Outbound	Total	Change
1985	1,562	2,424	3,986	Steady
1986	1,288	3,477	4,765	▲19.6%
1987	2,000	4,214	6,213	▲30.4%
1988	2,489	4,494	6,984	▲12.5%
1989	2,483	4,585	7,069	▲1.3%
1990	2,212	4,757	6,969	▼ -1.4%
1991	2,731	6,003	8,734	▲25.3%
1992	2,498	6,298	8,796	▲0.7%
1993	2,801	7,402	10,203	▲16.0%
1994	3,180	7,352	10,532	▲3.2%
1995	2,811	6,998	9,809	▼ -6.9%
1996	3,189	7,240	10,429	▲6.3%
1997	3,357	7,251	10,609	▲1.7%
1998	3,256	6,758	9,994	▼ -5.8%
1999	3,691	6,412	10,102	▲1.1%
2000	4,410	7,755	12,165	▲20.4%
2001	3,743	8,104	11,846	▼ -2.6%
2002	4,752	7,083	11,835	▼ -0.1%
2003	5,225	7,400	12,625	▲6.7%
2004	6,235	7,306	13,542	▲7.3%
2005	7,199	8,227	15,426	▲13.9%
2006	9,236	9,588	18,824	▲22.0%
2007	8,930	9,085	18,025	▼ -4.2%
2008	8,884	10,571	19,455	▲7.9%
2009	7,114	11,929	19,043	▼ -2.1%
2010	8,822	10,074	18,896	▼ -0.8%
2011	9,489	8,552	18,041	▼ -4.4%
2012	10,310	9,017	19,327	▲7.1%
2013	10,840	10,434	21,273	▲10.1%
2014	10,231	9,568	19,800	▼6.9%
2015	10,009	11,347	21,356	▲7.9%
2016	10,042	13,737	23,779	▲11.3%
2017	13,169	16,554	29,723	▲25.0%
2018	14,378	18,374	32,752	▲10.2%
2019	12,982	17,545	30,527	▼ -6.8%
2020	4,592	7,353	11,945	▼ -60.9%
2021	5,290	6,879	12,169	▲1.9%
2022	4,926	5,537	10,463	▼ -14.0%
2023	6,049	7,262	13,311	▲27.2%
2024	8,111	9,906	18,016	▲35.4%
2025	11,962	10,842	22,824	▲26.7%

== Awards and accolades ==
Adelaide Airport consistently ranks within the top hundred airports globally, as well within the top ten in the 5-15 million passenger category. It has also been named Australia's best capital city airport on numerous occasions, in 2006, 2009, 2011, and 2024. Additionally, the airport has also won Skytrax World Airport Awards' best regional airport ranking in the Australia-Pacific region in 2022 and 2024.

== Accidents and incidents ==
- On 13 July 1972, an Ansett Australia Piper PA-31 Navajo aircraft, registered as VH-CIZ, crashed near Golden Grove shortly after departing Adelaide for a charter flight to Moomba Airport. All eight people on board, including the pilot and seven passengers, were killed.

== Ground transport ==
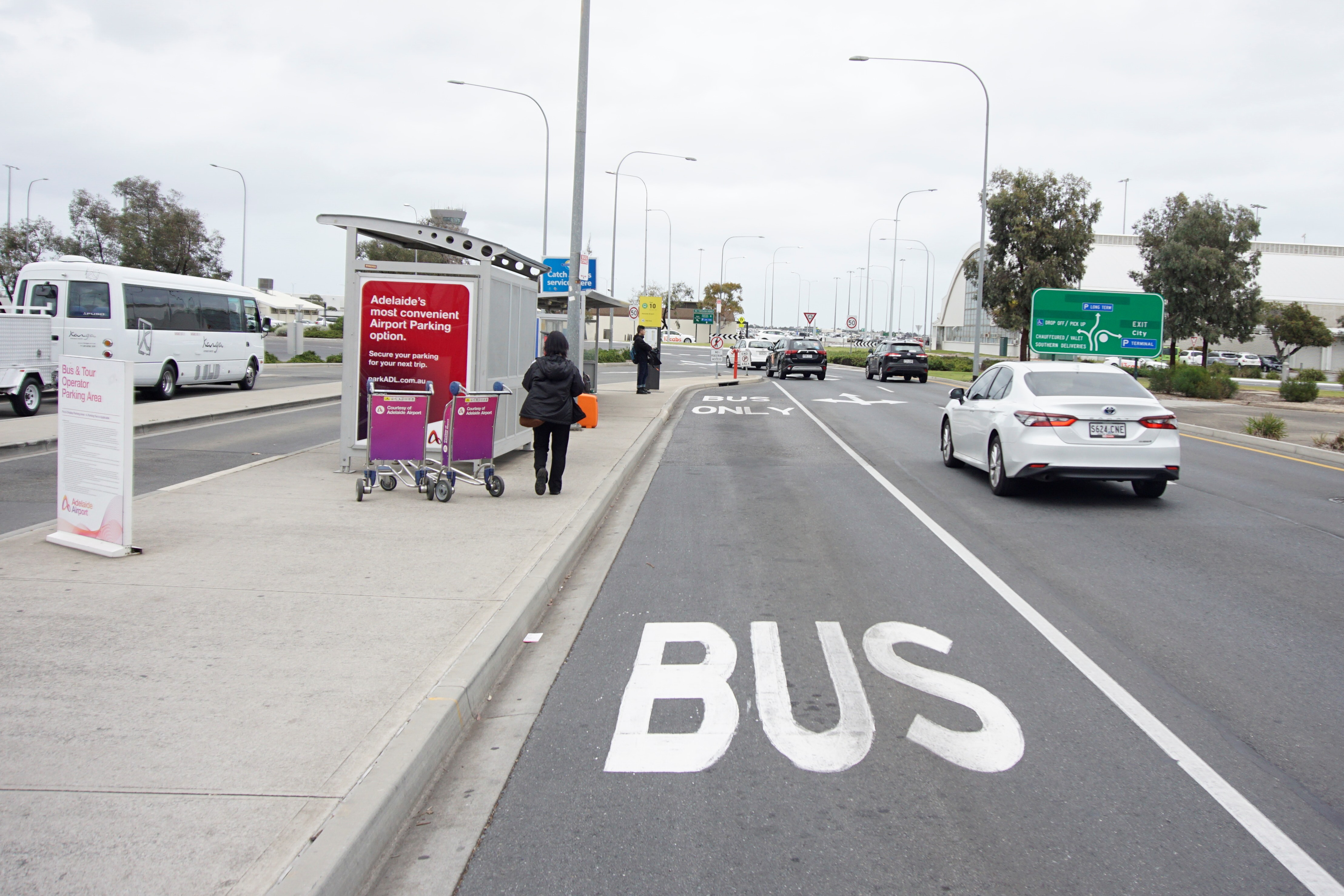
Bus stop, Adelaide Airport

Adelaide Metro operates frequent JetBus services connecting the airport to a number of locations across metropolitan Adelaide, including the CBD.

Routes J1 and J2 connect the airport to central Adelaide and suburban destinations including Westfield Tea Tree Plaza, Glenelg and Harbour Town.

Routes J7 and J8 operate between the airport and Westfield West Lakes and Westfield Marion.

Taxis and rental cars are also available near the terminal building.

Plans to build a rail line to the airport have been cancelled.
