= City of Mitcham =

Coordinates: 35°1′S 138°38′E

- Local government area
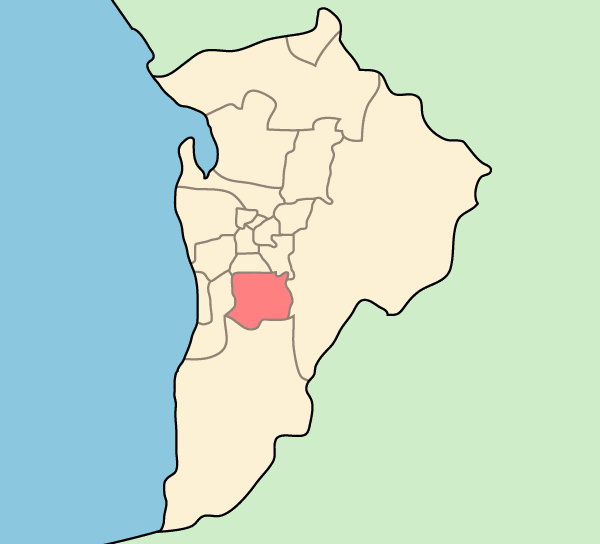

- Interactive map of City of Mitcham
- Country: Australia
- State: South Australia
- Region: Southern Adelaide
- City: Adelaide
- Established: 1853
- Council seat: Torrens Park

Government
  - Mayor: Heather Holmes-Ross
  - State electorate: Davenport, Elder, Heysen, Waite, Unley
  - Federal division: Boothby

Area
  - Total: 75.70 km^{2} (29.23 sq mi)

Population
  - Total: 67,617 (LGA 2021)
  - Density: 893.22/km^{2} (2,313.4/sq mi)
- Time zone: Australian Central Standard Time (ACST)
- Website: City of Mitcham
LGAs around City of Mitcham
| | City of Unley | City of Burnside |
| City of Marion | City of Mitcham | Adelaide Hills Council |
| | City of Onkaparinga |

The City of Mitcham is a local government area in the foothills of southern Adelaide, South Australia. Within its bounds is Flinders University, South Australia's second largest, and the notable, affluent suburb of Springfield which contains some of the city's most expensive properties.

== History ==
Before the arrival of European settlers, the Kaurna people lived in the region. The first Europeans to settle in the area were a group of sailors who jumped ship in 1837 and founded a settlement at Coromandel Valley as a hiding place. Mitcham village was established on Brown Hill Creek in 1840, named after Mitcham, a village in Surrey.

The council was founded on 10 May 1853 as the District Council of Mitcham and was the first local government area formally founded in South Australia after the City of Adelaide. The council initially covered an area of 108 square kilometres, stretching from the Adelaide Park Lands in the north to Mount Barker Road in the east, with the Sturt River forming the southern boundary. It lost the part of the council west of South Road to the District Council of Brighton (later the City of Marion) on 19 December 1854. In 1871, Unley and surrounding areas were severed from the Mitcham council to create the Corporate Town of Unley. It lost another area on 25 October 1883, when portions of the council around Stirling were detached to form the new District Council of Stirling.

From 1854 to 1869, the council rented offices in the Adelaide City Centre to conduct their business, only relocating to within the council itself in 1870. Its current council chambers in Torrens Park were first built in 1934. The District Council become a Corporation in 1944, and it gained city status in 1947, becoming the City of Mitcham. The state government planned to dissolve the City of Mitcham in 1989, but the council was able to lobby to prevent its dissolution.

In February 2021 the City of Mitcham became the first local council in South Australia to officially oppose the date of Australia Day. It generally no longer holds Australia Day celebrations on the official date.

=== Colebrook ===
Colebrook Home, first established in Quorn in the Flinders Ranges in 1927, moved to Eden Hills in the 1940s to secure better water supply. The home was an institution for Aboriginal children, with the intention of removing them from the influence of their Aboriginal families so they could be better assimilated into white society as part of the Stolen Generations. In 1972 the children were relocated to Blackwood due to low numbers and Colebrook Home was demolished in 1973. It was officially closed in 1981.

The former location of Colebrook Home is now the Colebrook Reconciliation Park, a memorial to the children and families impacted by Colebrook Home. The Blackwood Reconciliation Group and the Colebrook Tji Tji Tjuta (a number of former residents of Colebrook Home) combined to organise community gatherings on the site starting in 1997. Two statues have been sculpted to commemorate the Stolen Generations (the 'Fountain of Tears' in 1998 and the 'Grieving Mother' in 1999).

== Environment ==
Mitcham is one of three suburban Adelaide councils to be awarded a "Tree Cities of the World" designation from the Food and Agriculture Organization of the United Nations (FAO) and Arbor Day Foundation, along with the City of Burnside and the City of Unley, and as of July 2020 the only three in Australia.

== Council ==
The council as of January 2026, and the councillors' registered interests as of December 2022, are:

| Ward | Party | Councillor |
|---|---|---|
| Mayor | Independent | Heather Holmes-Ross |
| Babbage | Independent | Yvonne Todd |
| Babbage | Labor | Aidan Greenshields |
| Boorman | Independent | Andrew Tilley |
| Boorman | Greens | Joanna Wells (Note: Ran as the Greens candidate for Boothby in the 2025 Federal Election.) |
| Craigburn | Independent | Darren Kruse |
| Craigburn | Independent | Karen Hockley |
| Gault | Liberal | Pia George |
| Gault | Independent | Rod Moss |
| Overton | Independent | Kamal Bhagat |
| Overton | Greens | Jane Bange |
| The Park | Independent | Tom Morrison |
| The Park | Independent | Corin McCarthy |

== Suburbs ==
The City of Mitcham includes all or part of 32 suburbs:

- Bedford Park (part)
- Belair (part)
- Bellevue Heights
- Blackwood
- Brown Hill Creek
- Clapham
- Clarence Gardens
- Colonel Light Gardens
- Coromandel Valley (part)
- Crafers West (part)
- Craigburn Farm
- Cumberland Park
- Daw Park
- Eden Hills
- Glenalta
- Hawthorn
- Hawthorndene
- Kingswood
- Leawood Gardens (part)
- Lower Mitcham
- Lynton
- Melrose Park
- Mitcham
- Netherby
- Panorama
- Pasadena
- Springfield
- St. Marys
- Torrens Park
- Upper Sturt (part)
- Urrbrae
- Westbourne Park

== Wards ==
The City of Mitcham is divided into 6 wards, each of which elect 2 representatives to the Council. They cover suburbs roughly as follows.

| Ward | Suburbs |
|---|---|
| Overton | Clarence Gardens, Cumberland Park, Melrose Park, Daw Park, (part of) Colonel Light Gardens |
| Gault | Westbourne Park, Hawthorn, (most of) Colonel Light Gardens, Lower Mitcham, (part of) Clapham |
| Boorman | Kingswood, Netherby, Urrbrae, Torrens Park, Mitcham, Springfield, Brownhill Creek, Leawood Gardens, Lynton |
| Babbage | St Marys, Pasadena, Panorama, (part of) Clapham, Bedford Park |
| The Park | (most of) Belair, Glenalta, (part of) Crafers West, (part of) Blackwood, Hawthorndene, (part of) Upper Sturt |
| Craigburn | Eden Hills, (part of) Belair, (most of) Blackwood, Bellevue Heights, Craigburn Farm, (part of) Coromandel Valley |

== Transport ==
The first rail service in the City Mitcham was a horse-tram track, first opened in 1879. The line was converted to electricity in 1911, and further tram lines were opened in the council in the early 20th century. From 1958, these tram lines were shut down and replaced with bus services.

The City of Mitcham is currently serviced by the Belair railway line, which runs via the Adelaide–Wolseley railway line that connects Adelaide to Melbourne. This railway line was constructed from 1879 to 1887, and expanded from a single track to a double track in 1919 to manage increasing traffic. The council area includes the Mitcham, Torrens Park, Lynton, Eden Hills, Coromandel, Blackwood, Glenalta, Pinera, and Belair railway stations, as well as the former Clapham railway station.

In addition to bus services operated by Adelaide Metro, the City of Mitcham operates a door-to-door community bus service for the elderly and people living with a disability. The council has two which that travel weekly to local shopping centres.

In 2018/19, transport accounted for 26% of the City of Mitcham's greenhouse gas emissions, with 23% coming from cars alone, making automobile transport the second-biggest contributor to the council area's emissions. The City of Mitcham has invested in six electric vehicle charging stations (four in Torrens Park and two in Blackwood) to assist the transition away from fossil fuels.

== See also ==
- Local Government Areas of South Australia
- List of Adelaide suburbs
- List of Adelaide parks and gardens
