= Goodwood Road, Adelaide =

Road in Adelaide, South Australia

Goodwood Road Fiveash Drive, Ayliffes Road South Australia
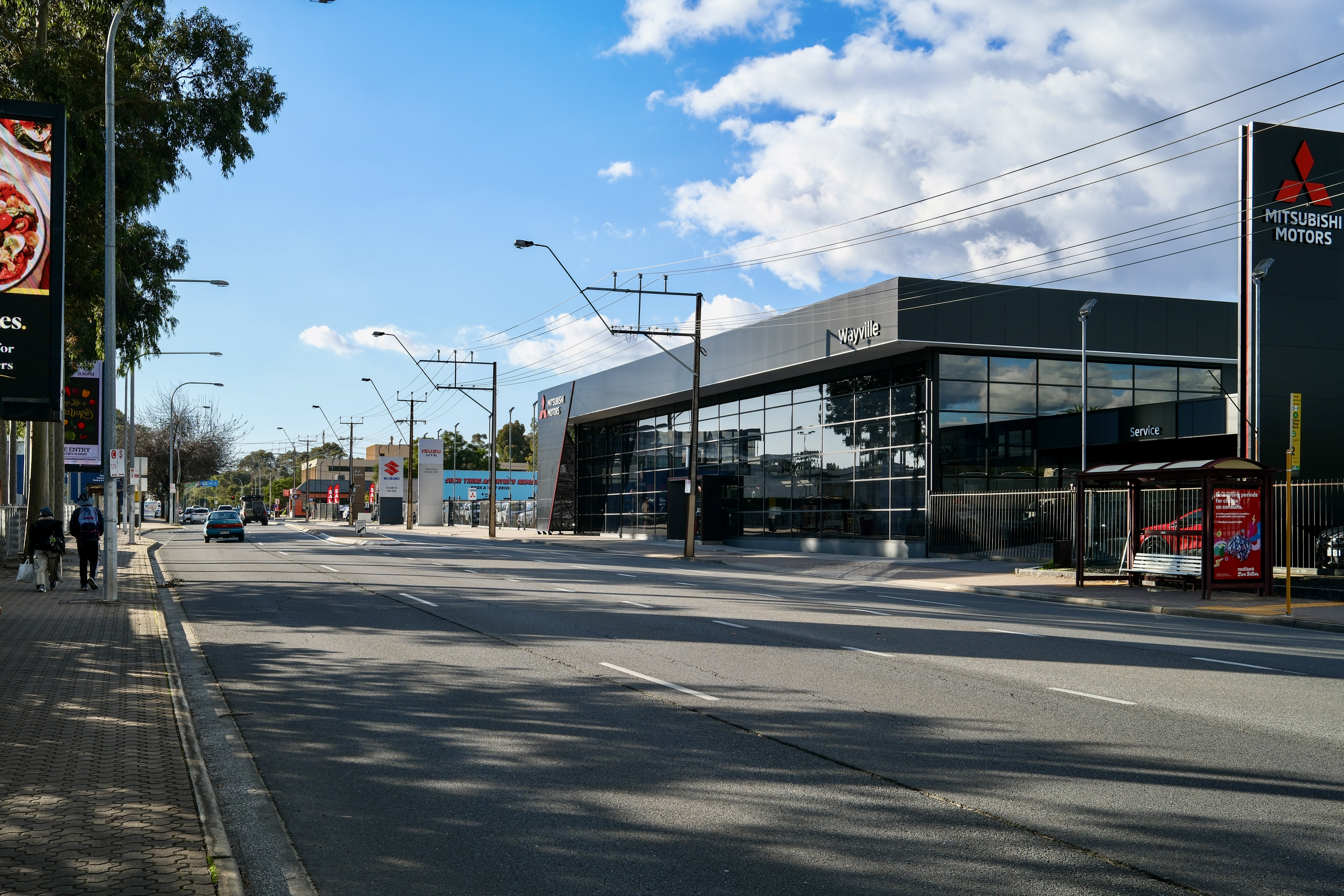
- Goodwood road, looking north
- Coordinates: 34.936296°S 138.588411°E (North end); 35.011318°S 138.576172°E (South end)

General information
- Type: Road
- Location: Adelaide
- Length: 9.3 km (5.8 mi)
- Former route number: A21 (1998–2017) (Adelaide–Wayville)

Major junctions
- North end: West Terrace; South Terrace; Anzac Highway; Adelaide
- Greenhill Road; Cross Road
- South end: Southern Expressway; South Road; Main South Road; St Marys, Adelaide

Location(s)
- Region: Eastern Adelaide, Southern Adelaide

Goodwood Road (and its southern sections as Fiveash Drive and Ayliffes Road) is a major north–south arterial road, approximately 10 kilometres long, in Adelaide, South Australia. It runs between the Adelaide city centre and Adelaide's southern suburbs of Pasadena and Panorama, and St Marys.

== Route ==
Goodwood starts at the intersection of Anzac Highway, West Terrace and South Terrace in the south-western corner of the Adelaide city centre. It heads south, through the southern Adelaide Parklands to meet with Greenhill Road. It continues south through Wayville, passing the Royal Adelaide Showgrounds. The traffic lights at Leader Street mark the boundary with the suburb of Goodwood, and the location of the Goodwood Park Hotel.

The road then crosses the Glenelg tram line and, although it retains 4 lanes, the speed limit is reduced to 50 km/h. The road narrows as it passes the Goodwood library, civic centre and shopping precinct which contains Capri Theatre, numerous restaurants, and Goodwood Primary School. Victoria Street marks the boundary with the suburb of Millswood. The road continues past the former Goodwood Orphanage through the so-called "Goodwood Subway", adjacent to Millswood railway station.

This is a deep road underpass which has double-lane traffic in both directions, and an elevated pedestrian walkway along the western wall. It was originally built for the Goodwood Road tram to pass safely under the Belair railway line and the main Adelaide-Melbourne Railway Line. Although the trams stopped travelling along Goodwood Road and the tracks were removed many decades ago, the subway continues to provide grade-separation between a very busy arterial road and a railway line with long, slow freight trains.

Past the subway, the road widens and the speed limit returns to 60 km/h again. It continues south through the suburbs of Kings Park, (east side and possibly Adelaide's smallest suburb), and Clarence Park (west side) to the intersection with Cross Road, a busy intersection now monitored by speed and red light cameras.

Passing through the suburbs of Cumberland Park (west side) and Westbourne Park (east side), the next major intersection is where Edward Street and Grange Road meet, and marks the start of Colonel Light Gardens (east side) and Daw Park (west side). Here the road widens considerably to 6 lanes and a dual carriageway separated by a wide central grassed nature strip containing many trees.

At the intersection of Springbank and Daws roads, although it retains 6 lanes and dual carriageway, the road narrows and its wide central nature strip is replaced by a narrow concrete curb. Located near this intersection are the Repatriation General Hospital, Daw Park, Springbank Secondary College, and Bedford Industries.

Goodwood Road continues south through Panorama for almost another kilometre, passing the Centennial Park Cemetery before turning south-west and changing name to Fiveash Drive. It heads through Pasadena for a short distance before turning west into St Marys and changing name to Ayliffes Road. It passes Shepherds Hill Recreation Park before ending at the intersection of South Road and Shepherds Hill Road, and the Southern Expressway beyond.

== Major intersections ==
LGA	Location	km	mi	Destinations	Notes
Adelaide	Adelaide	0.0	0.0	West Terrace (north) – Adelaide CBD; South Terrace (east) – Adelaide CBD; Anzac Highway (southwest) – Plympton, Glenelg	Northern terminus of Goodwood Road; no access from Anzac Highway to Goodwood Road
Adelaide–Unley boundary	Adelaide–Wayville boundary	0.6	0.37	Greenhill Road (R1) – Burnside, Uraidla, Balhannah	
Unley	Goodwood	1.5	0.93	Glenelg tram line	
Unley	Millswood–Kings Park boundary	2.5	1.6	Belair railway line	
Unley–Mitcham boundary	Clarence Park–Kings Park–Cumberland Park–Westbourne Park quadripoint	3.4	2.1	Cross Road (A3) – Plympton, Glen Osmond	
Mitcham	Daw Park–Panorama boundary	6.1	3.8	Daws Road (west) – Park Holme, Repat Health Precinct; Springbank Road (east) – Clapham	
Mitcham	Pasadena–Panorama boundary	7.1	4.4	Grandview Drive – Panorama	Name change: Goodwood Road (north), Fiveash Drive (southwest)
Mitcham	Pasadena–Panorama boundary	8.5	5.3	Cashel Street (no access)	Name change: Fiveash Drive (northeast), Ayliffes Road (west)
Mitcham–Marion boundary	St Marys–Tonsley–Bedford Park tripoint	9.3	5.8	Southern Expressway (M2 southwest) – Reynella, Old Noarlunga	South-westbound entry and north-eastbound exit only
Mitcham–Marion boundary	St Marys–Tonsley–Bedford Park tripoint	9.3	5.8	South Road (north) – Edwardstown, Mile End, Hindmarsh; Main South Road (southwest) – Reynella, Cape Jervis, Victor Harbor; Shepherds Hill Road (south) – Blackwood	Southern terminus of Ayliffes Road
Route transition

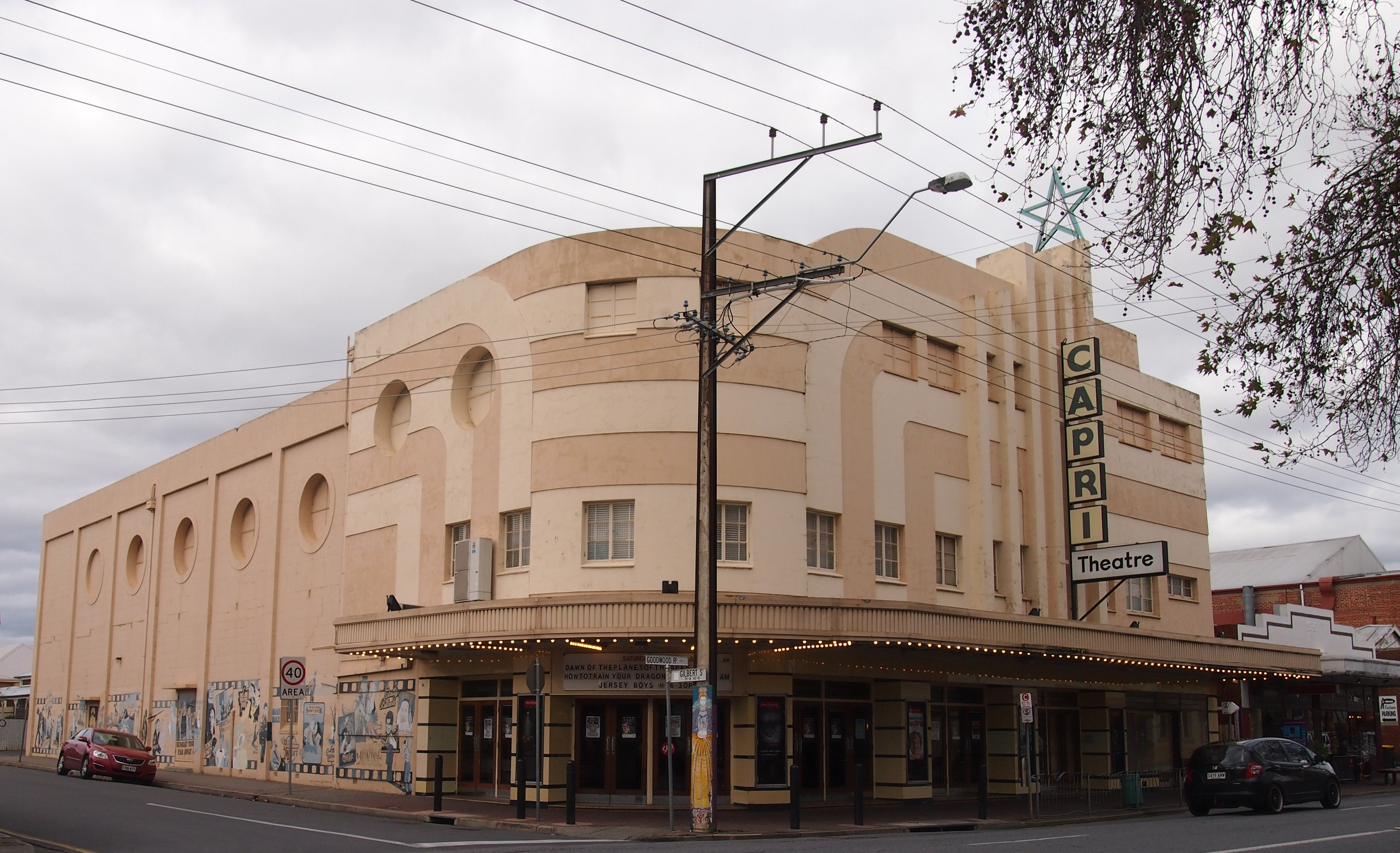
The Capri Cinema

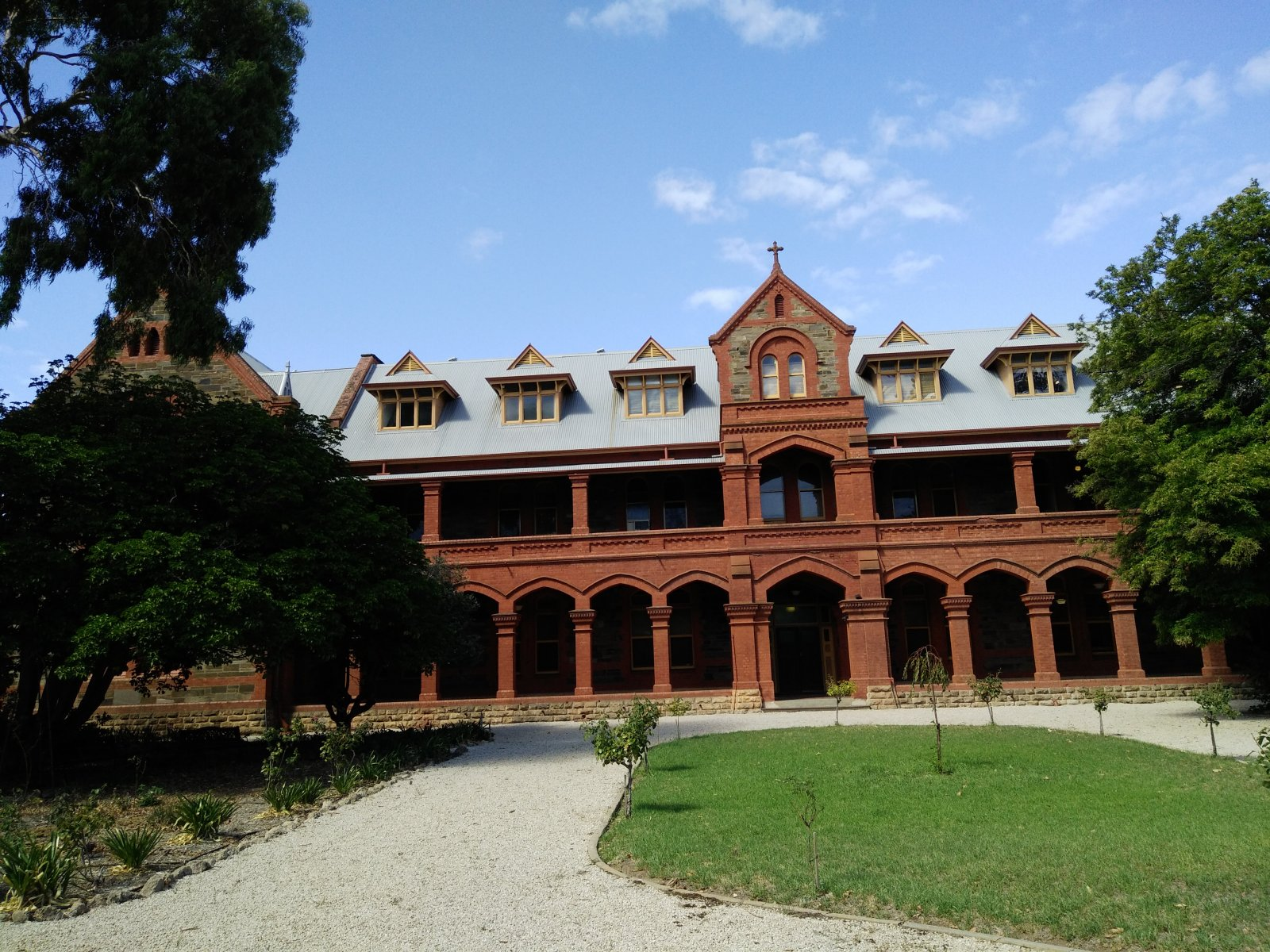
The Goodwood Orphanage

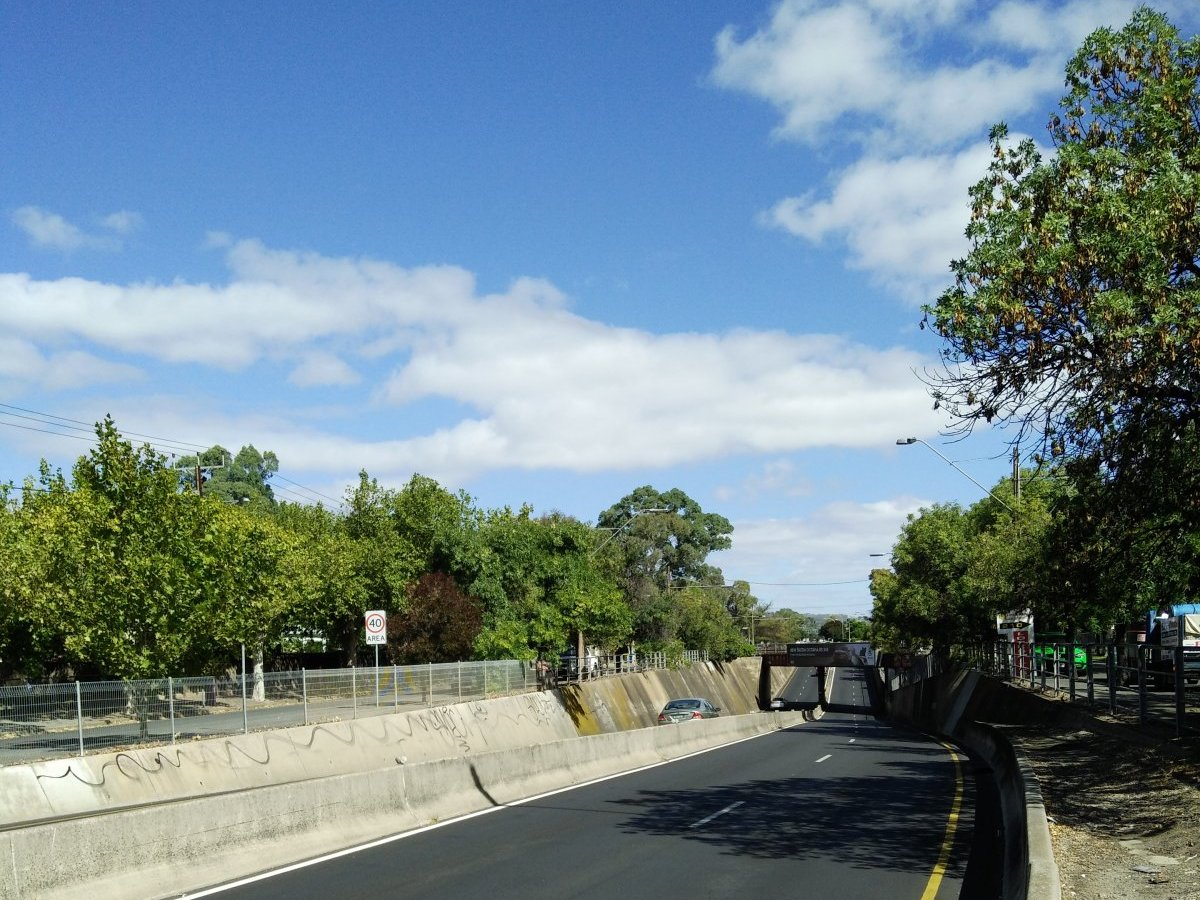
Goodwood Subway and Belair Railway Line

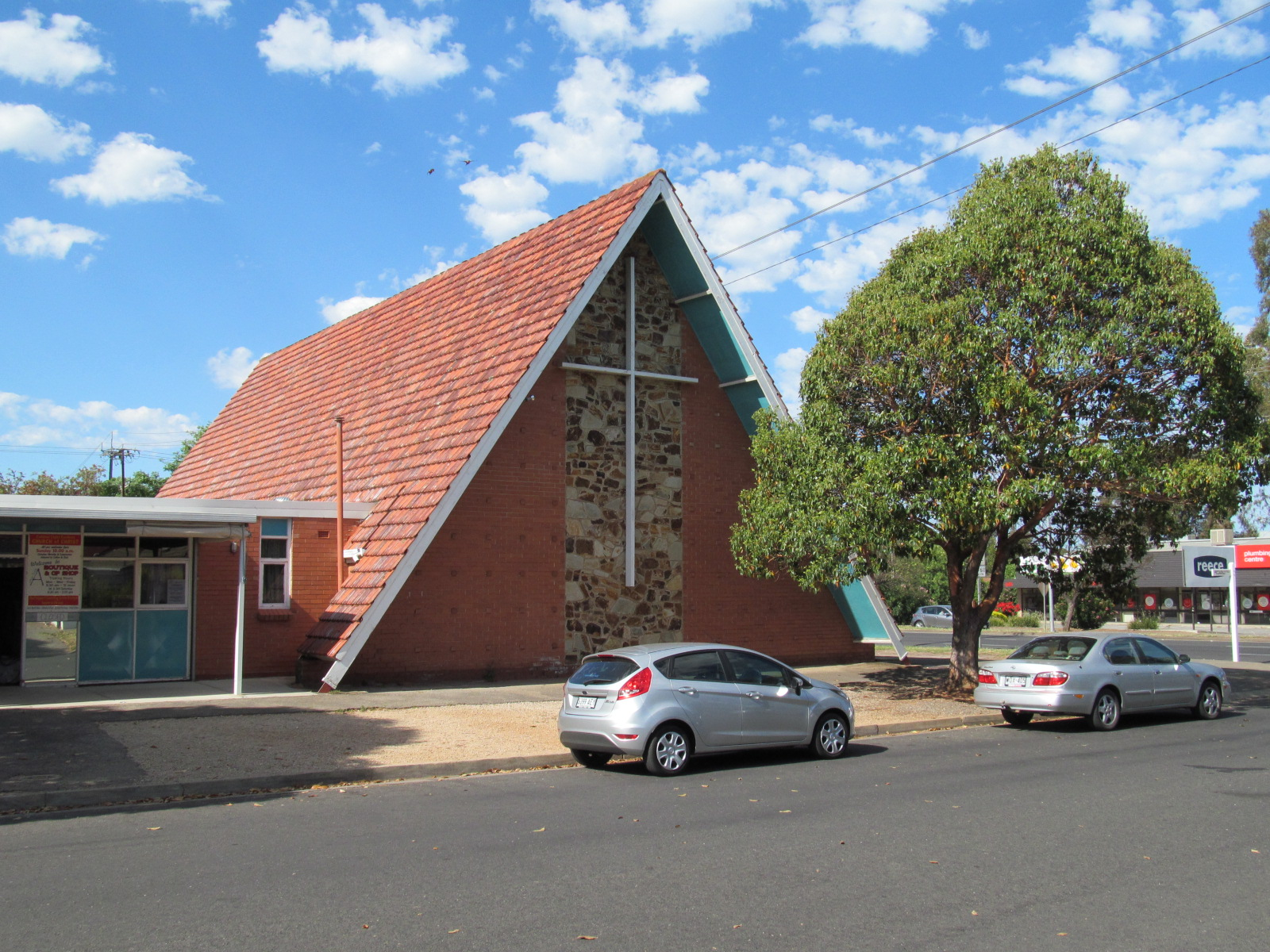
Church of Christ, Colonel Light Gardens

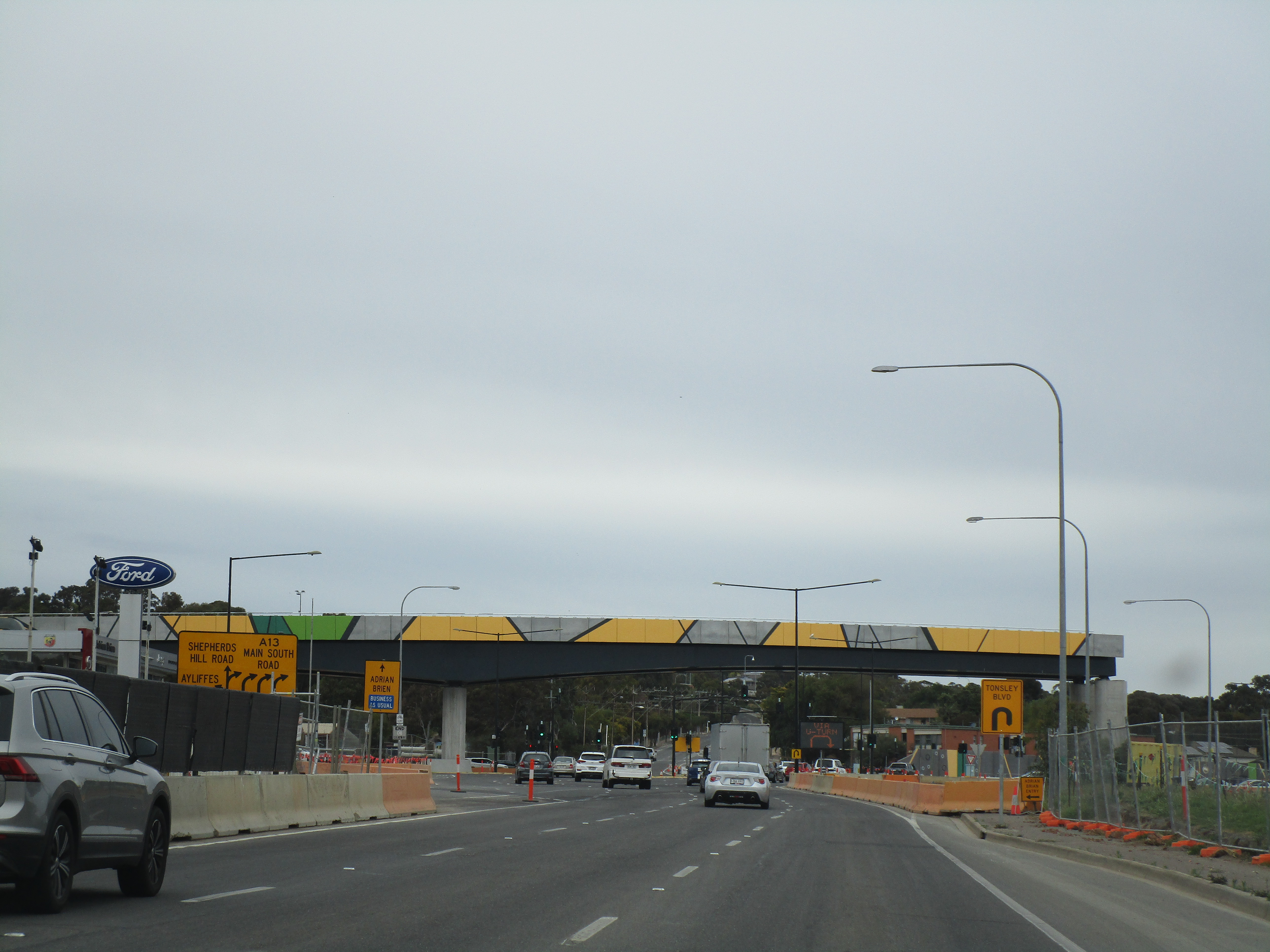
Ayliffes Road bridge: The above ground road bridges were assembled on-site and moved into their final position using multi-wheeled lifters.

== Tram stop ==
Goodwood Road is also the location of a stop on the Glenelg tram line.

Preceding station	Adelaide Metro	Following station
Wayville towards Royal Adelaide Hospital, Adelaide Entertainment Centre or Festival Plaza	Glenelg tram line	Forestville towards Moseley Square

== See also ==
- Transport in Adelaide
- Roads in Australia
