= Torrens Park, South Australia =

Torrens Park
- Suburb
- Interactive map of Torrens Park
- Coordinates: 34°59′10″S 138°36′58″E
- Country: Australia
- State: South Australia
- City: Adelaide
- LGA: City of Mitcham
- Location: 8 km (5.0 mi) from Adelaide
- Established: 1945

Government
  - State electorate: Waite
  - Federal division: Boothby

Area
  - Total: 2.0 km^{2} (0.77 sq mi)

Population
  - Total: 2,687 (SAL 2021)
- Postcode: 5062
Suburbs around Torrens Park
Hawthorn	Kingswood	Netherby
Lower Mitcham	Torrens Park	Springfield
Clapham; Lynton	Belair	Mitcham; Brown Hill Creek

Torrens Park is a mainly residential large inner-southern suburb of Adelaide, incorporating some of the foothills and adjacent to the original "Mitcham Village". It was named after Sir Robert Richard Torrens, the instigator of the Torrens title system of land registration and transfer, who built a large home in the area which he named Torrens Park.

The suburb is in the City of Mitcham local government area, the South Australian House of Assembly electoral district of Waite and the Australian House of Representatives Division of Boothby.

== History ==
The name was formally submitted for approval in 1945. Torrens Park is named after Sir Robert Richard Torrens, the third Premier of South Australia and instigator of the Torrens title land title system. Torrens built a large home which he called "Torrens Park" near Mitcham in 1853–4. In 1865 Torrens sold the house to his partner in the Moonta Mines (later founder of the University of Adelaide), Walter Watson Hughes, who enlarged it and later sold it to businessman and philanthropist Robert Barr Smith. It is now part of Scotch College. Although the original gates have recently been removed, the original gatehouse to the Estate is still visible at the corner of Belair Road and Ayr Avenue.

Torrens Park Post Office opened on 24 August 1953 and closed in 1972.

Part of today's suburb was laid out in 1917 from the estate of Tom Elder Barr-Smith; various parts of the suburb were originally known as "Glenburnie", Blytheswoodville, Panchito Park, Blythwood Estate and West Mitcham.

== Geography ==
In comparison with most Adelaide suburbs, Torrens Park is quite large. The north end of the suburb is reasonably flat, but as one travels south (towards the foothills) the terrain rises and becomes hilly. Brown Hill Creek runs through the suburb from the south-east to the north-west. Due to the foothills, the rainfall in the City of Mitcham is 25–50 per cent higher than the rainfall on the Adelaide Plains.

Torrens Park is also the location of the Mitcham Square Shopping Centre.

== Politics ==
Traditionally, the area has been part of a "blue ribbon Liberal" seat; however, elections in 2022 saw both state and federal seats fall to the opposing Labor Party.

== Schools ==
The only school actually located in the suburb is Scotch College.

Nearby Primary Schools:

- Clapham
- Mitcham
- Colonel Light Gardens

Nearby High Schools:

- Unley High School
- Urrbrae Agricultural High School
- Pasadena High School
- Mitcham Girls High School
- Mercedes College

== Public transport ==
Public transport to Torrens Park is available through the Belair railway line, to the Mitcham (North-West), Torrens Park (West) and Lynton (South-West) stations. Buses are also available to and from the City along Belair Road.

Route 192 terminates on Kays Road; Routes 194 and 196 pass through the suburb en route to Blackwood Station. Route 171 travels along Princes Road serving the northern side of the suburb and then via Fullarton Road to the city.

== See also ==
- List of Adelaide suburbs
