= Colonel Light Gardens, South Australia =

Colonel Light Gardens
- Suburb
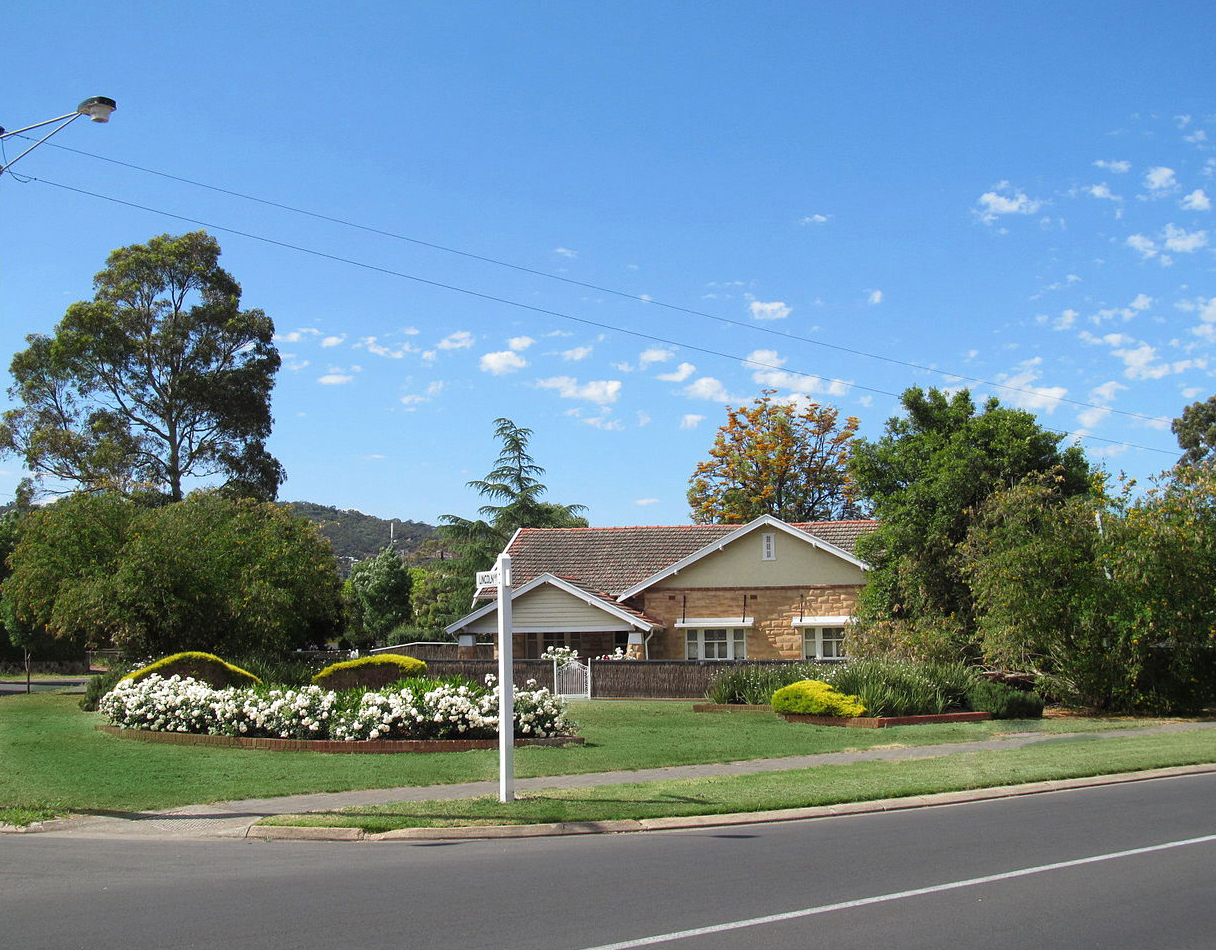
- Lincoln Avenue

- Coordinates: 34°58′55″S 138°35′31″E
- Country: Australia
- State: South Australia
- City: Adelaide
- LGA: City of Mitcham

Government
  - State electorate: Elder
  - Federal division: Boothby

Population
  - Total: 3,349 (SAL 2016)
- Postcode: 5041
Suburbs around Colonel Light Gardens
| Melrose Park, Daw Park | Daw Park, Westbourne Park | Hawthorn |
| Melrose Park | Colonel Light Gardens | Lower Mitcham, Clapham |
| Daw Park | Daw Park, Panorama | Clapham |

Colonel Light Gardens is a suburb located within the Australian City of Mitcham in the greater Adelaide region, approximately 7 km (4 mi) south of the Adelaide city centre. The area is 1.58 km^{2} (0.61 sq mi). Planned as a garden suburb, it is known for wide, tree-lined streets, presentable postwar bungalow homes, rounded street corners, and much manicured, well maintained open space.

It contains Colonel Light Gardens Primary School, the Colonel Light Gardens RSL Sub-Branch, a number of sporting clubs using the name Reade Park, and a multitude of historical parks and gardens. It also contains many paved and unpaved laneways, alleyways and bike tracks.

The suburb is of irregular shape and follows Goodwood Road. The major part of the suburb is east of Goodwood Road and is bounded by Grange Road (north), Goodwood Road (west), and Springbank Road (south), and the suburbs of Westbourne Park, Lower Mitcham, Clapham and Panorama. A smaller part of the suburb is west of Goodwood Road and divides the neighbouring Daw Park into two unjoined parts which are the northern and southern boundaries of this smaller part.

== Naming ==
The land east of Goodwood Road was purchased from the "Grange Farm" portion of the estate of William Ranson Mortlock in June 1915, and was initially referred to as Mortlock Park. For the next six years there was much debate and many proposals for the name of the suburb, including "Mitcham Garden Suburb", "Garden Suburb, Adelaide", "Light Garden Suburb", "William Light Garden Suburb", "Light Gardens" and at least half-a-dozen other names.

In April 1921, the Attorney-General (Henry Barwell) noted that "Colonel Light Gardens to be the name of the Garden Suburb". The suburb is named after the first Surveyor-General of Adelaide, Colonel William Light.

The land west of Goodwood Road was purchased from the Estate of Shobbrooks, and a smaller block was purchased from A. Hann. This became part of Colonel Light Gardens in 1924. There have been a number of attempts to rename this area to Daw Park.

For many years residents in the northern section of the suburb adopted Reade Park as their address to distinguish themselves from the Thousand Homes Scheme area. This use was never officially recognised, and over the years has steadily declined. Nevertheless, the Reade Park Bowling Club, the Reade Park Tennis Club and the Reade Park Croquet Club are all located in the northern part of Colonel Light Gardens.

== History ==
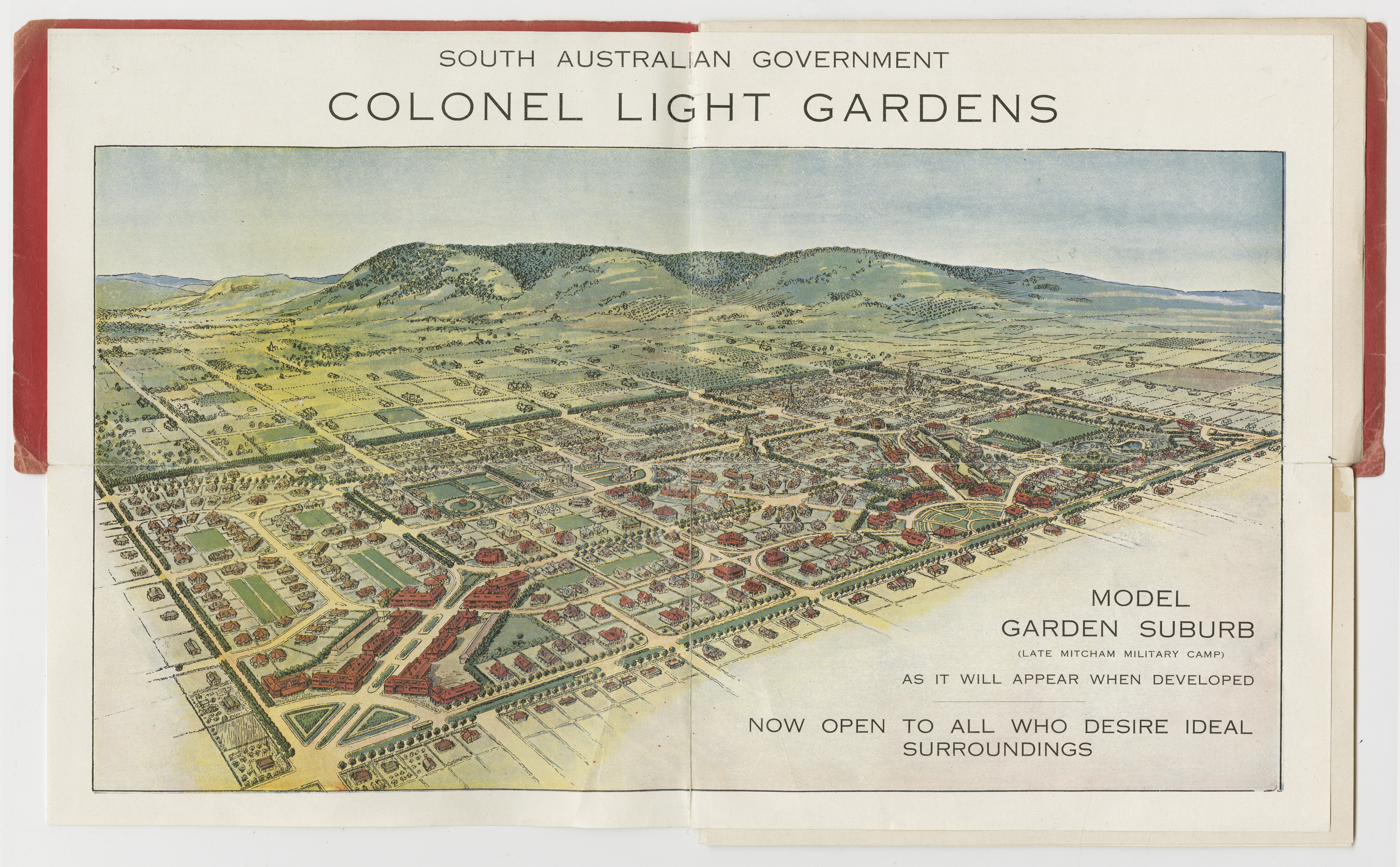
Postcard depicting the suburb, ca. 1921

The part of the suburb east of Goodwood Road was used as an army training camp during World War I, and prior to this the area was known as Grange Farm.

An area of 1.2 km^{2} was purchased in June 1915 by the Vaughan Labor government from the estate of William Tennant Mortlock. The Government decided to establish it as a 'model garden suburb' following New Zealand town planner Charles Reade's 1914 Australian Town Planning Tour. (South Australia appointed Reade as a town planning adviser in 1916. He became SA's first official Town Planner in 1918, retaining the position until 1920.)

The Post Office on Goodwood Road originally opened as Light's Gardens, was renamed Colonel Light Gardens on 1 January 1929 and Daw Park in 1967.

Until the 1970s the suburb was administered under the Garden Suburb Act and controlled by a South Australian government appointed Garden Suburb Commissioner, who carried out the functions of local government until it was eventually absorbed by the Mitcham Council.

The suburb contains many well preserved bungalow homes, and in October 1999 was placed on the Register of The National Estate. In 2000 the suburb was declared a State Heritage Area; for the heritage significance of Colonel Light Gardens, see the State Heritage Branch web page on Colonel Light Gardens.

The suburb has an unusual layout – when viewed from the air, part of the suburb is said by some to resemble the rising sun symbol of the Australian military, and by others to resemble a Union Flag. However, it was not designed this way. The Colonel Light Gardens Historical Society webpage "Urban Myth" discusses these.

== Schools ==
The primary school main building is heritage listed, and each building is named after a historic South Australian figure: Isabell Doolette, William Ranson Mortlock, Charles Reade, Gil Langley and the Grange Farm. The school was established in 1926 and has about 630 students from Reception to Year 6.

== Transport ==
The suburb is served by Adelaide Metro buses along Goodwood Road, East Parkway, Grange Road and Springbank Road.

The closest railway stations, Mitcham and Torrens Park on the Belair railway line, are situated some distance to the east on Belair Road. (Clapham station was closed in 1995.)

Colonel Light Gardens was served by a Municipal Tramways Trust tram line. It closed in the 1950s upon cessation of most of the tram routes around Adelaide.

== Politics ==
Local government: City of Mitcham, Gault Ward
State government: Electoral district of Elder in the South Australian House of Assembly
Federal government: Seat of Boothby in the Australian House of Representatives

== See also ==
- List of Adelaide suburbs
