= Sleeps Hill railway station =

Former railway station in South Australia, Australia

Sleeps Hill
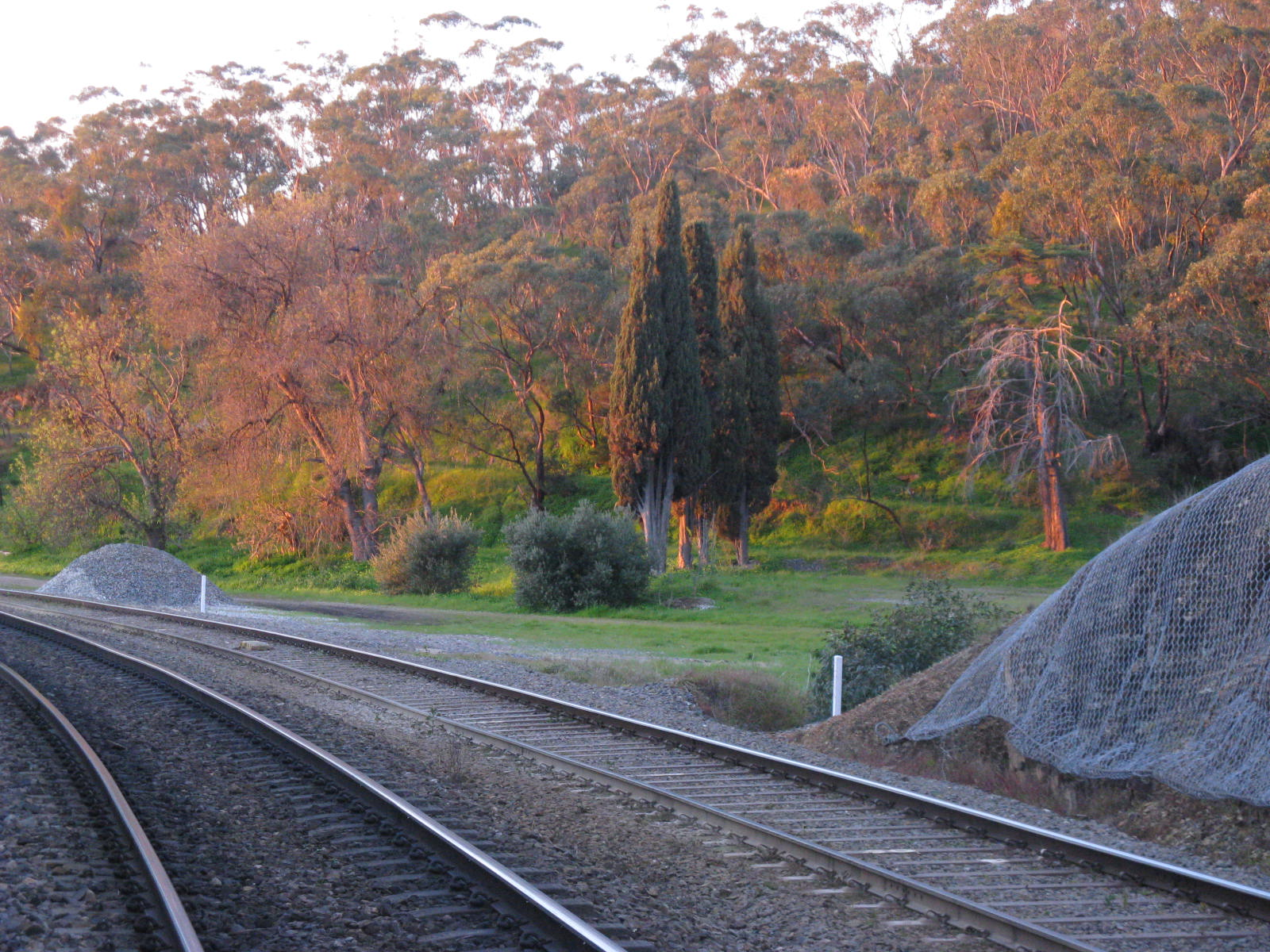
- Site of the now demolished station in August 2008

General information
- Coordinates: 35.00460°S 138.60095°E
- Operator: South Australian Railways
- Line: Adelaide-Wolseley
- Platforms: 2
- Tracks: 2

Construction
- Structure type: Ground

Other information
- Status: Closed
Location

Sleeps Hill was a former railway station that served a number of ballast quarries for the South Australian Railways (SAR). It was approximately 11–12 km from Adelaide railway station.

== History ==
From 1909, a branch line, parallel to the main line and the Clapham branch line, served the Sleeps Hill quarries. The branch became the second main line in 1915, and the quarries were worked by a backshunt from Eden Hills. For a short time, from 1916, Sleeps Hill was the Southern limit of SAR suburban train workings, until the double track passed through the new tunnels to Eden Hills. The station was relocated to the south of the quarry sidings in the 1940s and removed when Lynton station was opened in the mid-1950s. Some of the foundations of the station buildings, the trees from the station gardens, some of the foundations of the quarry crushing plant, and evidence of the alignment of the spur lines and sidings are all that remain.

In 1995, the western track of the double broad gauge track was converted to standard gauge, and the eastern track was doubled to provide one of the four crossing points on the current Adelaide-Belair passenger service.

== Quarries ==
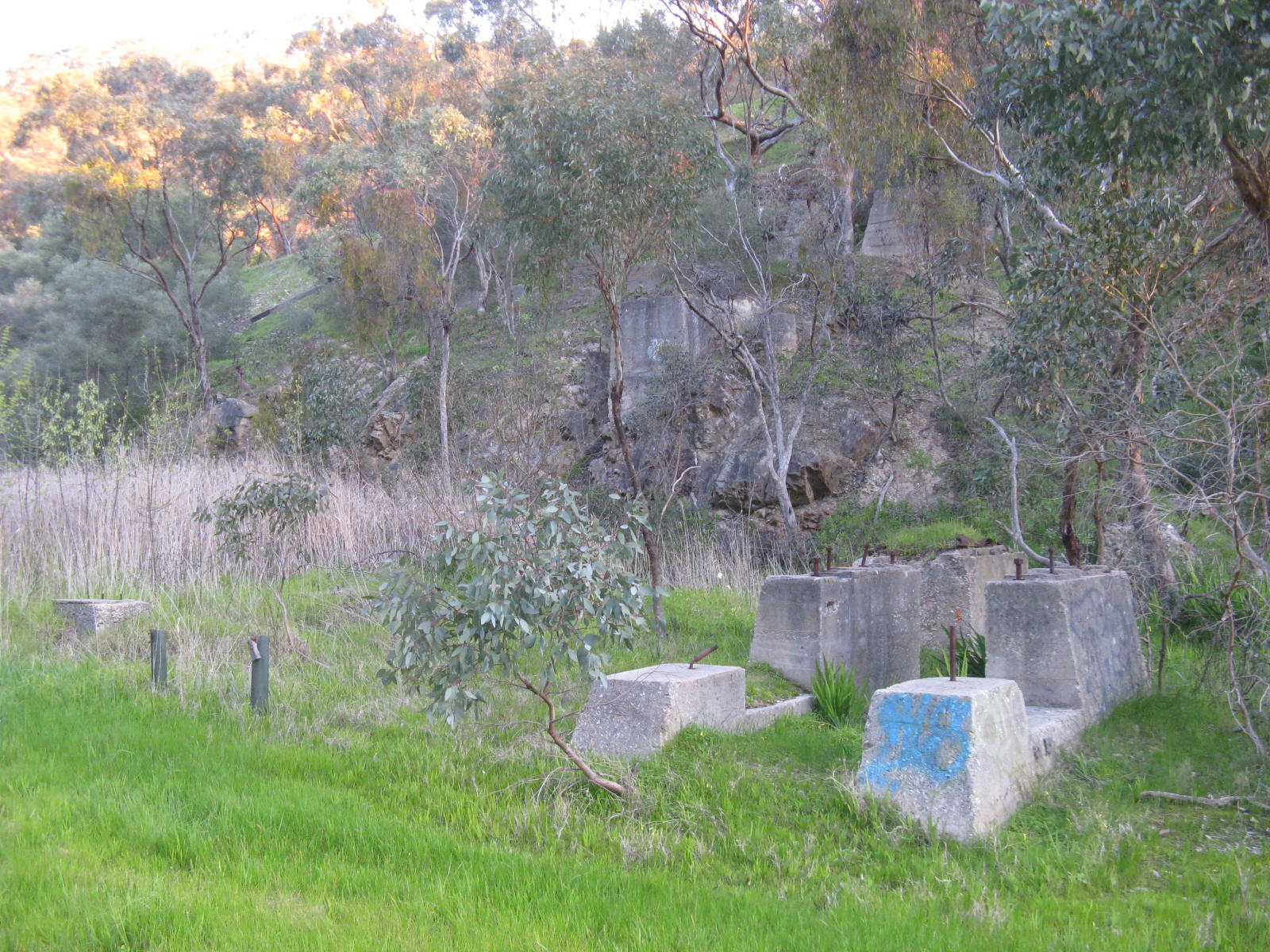
Sleeps Hill quarry in August 2008

A pamphlet produced by the SA Department of Mines and Energy in May 1990 states:

"Twelve quarries were developed near Sleeps Hill." ... "Quarries were opened in 1916 and were taken over by Adelaide Quarries Ltd in 1919. During the 1920s, the quarries were one of the leading producers of crushed rock in South Australia and employed up to 100 men." ... "After 1930, the Depression seriously curtailed operations, and quarrying eventually ceased about 1950." ... "Quarrying methods were both labour-intensive and dangerous - four men were killed in accidents at Sleeps Hill." ... "A flying fox was installed in 1924 to handle large blocks of stone for use in break-waters."

The Department of Mines and Energy, and the City of Mitcham, have placed a sign-board with information on the history of the quarries and crushing plant:

"Two crushing plants, erected in the 1920s on either side of the valley, were connected by a siding to the railway. These concrete foundations are the remains of a larger plant. The crushed rock was used in roadmaking, concrete and building work, paths and bitumen.
Broken stone from the quarries was dumped into a storage bin and fed by gravity into a primary jaw crusher. Secondary crushing was done by a gyratory crusher. The material was elevated to screens, where it was graded and deposited into a bin divided into compartments for the various sizes.
Crushed material from the northern plant was carried to the storage bin by a conveyor belt supported on a trestle framework. All power was supplied by electric motors. Workshops for blacksmithing and fitting and two compressors, which supplied air via pipelines for rock drills at the quarries, were located nearby.
Official Inspector of Mines and Quarries reports indicate that safety standards in the plant were far removed from those of today. A mill hand was killed in a fall from the plant in 1932."
