= Clapham, South Australia =

Clapham
- Suburb
- Coordinates: 34°59′24″S 138°36′11″E
- Country: Australia
- State: South Australia
- City: Adelaide
- LGA: City of Mitcham
- Location: 8 km (5.0 mi) from Adelaide

Government
  - State electorate: Elder
  - Federal division: Boothby

Population
  - Total: 1,685 (SAL 2021)
- Postcode: 5062
Suburbs around Clapham
Colonel Light Gardens	Lower Mitcham	Torrens Park
Colonel Light Gardens; Panorama	Clapham	Torrens Park
Panorama	Panorama; Lynton	Torrens Park; Lynton

Clapham (postcode 5062), located approximately 8 kilometres (5.0 mi) south of the Adelaide city centre, is a primarily residential suburb situated within the City of Mitcham, incorporating some of the foothills. The suburb is named after Clapham in London, England. Neighbouring suburbs are Colonel Light Gardens, Panorama, Lynton, Torrens Park and Lower Mitcham.

== Transport ==
Public transport to this suburb includes the Belair railway line (Torrens Park and Lynton stations) and Adelaide Metro bus route 200, which travels along East Parkway. Until 1995 it was also served by the Clapham railway station.

== Government ==
Clapham is in the City of Mitcham local government area, the South Australian House of Assembly electoral district of Elder and the Australian House of Representatives Division of Boothby.

== Schools ==
The state government school, Clapham Primary School, is located in Clapham and is an R-7 school. Out of schools hours child care is provided through the school.

== See also ==
- List of Adelaide suburbs
