= Eden Hills =

Eden Hills may refer to:

- Eden Hills, South Australia, a suburb in Adelaide, Australia
- Eden Hills, a fictitious suburb in the Australian TV soap opera Neighbours
- Eden Hills, member of Leeds City Council
