= Lynton, South Australia =

Lynton
- Suburb
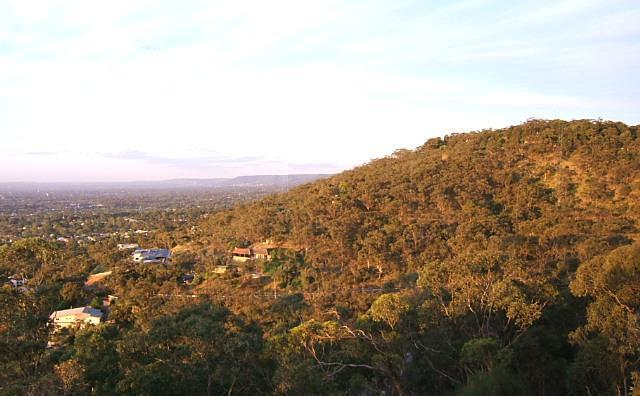
- View from Windy Point

- Coordinates: 34°59′53″S 138°36′32″E
- Country: Australia
- State: South Australia
- City: Adelaide
- LGA: City of Mitcham

Population
  - Total: 222 (SAL 2021)
- Postcode: 5062
Suburbs around Lynton
Panorama	Clapham	Torrens Park
Pasadena	Lynton	Torrens Park; Belair
Pasadena	Pasadena; Belair	Belair

Lynton is a suburb in the southern foothills hills of Adelaide, South Australia. A leafy suburb, it was established during the settlement of Adelaide as a source of timber. The nearby Windy Point lookout (formerly known as Observation Point) represents one of the best lookouts over the city and suburbs.
