= Eden Hills, South Australia =

Eden Hills
- Suburb
- Coordinates: 35°01′37″S 138°36′04″E
- Country: Australia
- State: South Australia
- City: Adelaide
- LGA: City of Mitcham
- Established: 1883

Government
  - State electorate: Waite
  - Federal division: Boothby

Population
  - Total: 3,020 (SAL 2021)
- Postcode: 5050
Suburbs around Eden Hills
St Marys	Pasadena, Panorama	Belair
Bedford Park	Eden Hills	Blackwood
Bellevue Heights		Craigburn Farm

Eden Hills is a south eastern suburb located in the foothills of Adelaide, South Australia. It is part of the local government area of the City of Mitcham.

== History ==
The Kaurna people are the original owners and custodians of the Adelaide plains and foothills. They historically used the foothills, including Eden Hills and Brownhill Creek (Wirraparinga) on a seasonal basis, moving there during winter months to avoid the flooding of rivers and creeks on the plains.

Whilst the derivation of the name Eden Hills is not conclusive, the Department of Lands Grant Book reveals the first land owner in the area was William Detmar Cook who purchased a property on 29 October 1839. Cook was Master of the barque Eden.

There was little settlement of the area until the early 1880s, when the railway from Adelaide to Nairne opened, being the first stage in the plan to link Adelaide to Melbourne. In 1883, a syndicate comprising John Whyte, James Cowan, Ebenezer Ward, John Hill, R. D. Moore, Seth Ferry and G. H. Catchlove acquired the sections of land where the suburb is now centred, and following a survey laid out the land into allotments.

Around that time Edwin Ashby moved into the area. Ashby and fellow land agent and financier Ernest Saunders owned and largely developed much of Eden Hills from 1890 and Ashby established the property Wittunga (now the Wittunga Botanic Garden) in Blackwood.

Eden Hills railway station c 1950.

The first class of Eden Hills Public School 1916

The opening of the Eden Hills railway station in 1911 hastened development in the area. A post office and store opened in 1912 and a school (now Eden Hills Primary School) opened in 1916. The school opened with 26 pupils enrolled. It was closed for a period during World War II and in the 1930's because of a diphtheria epidemic. The school's original stone classroom survives as a reception area. The Ashby family instigated the building of a Friends meeting house in 1912 which served as a venue for several religious denominations, the local dramatic society and other community events. It was demolished in 1956. An Anglican Parish Hall was built in 1927, and a Methodist church established in 1937, moving to its current location (now Eden Hills Uniting Church) in 1957.

A brickworks was established near the railway line and (originally Shephard's) Shepherds Hill Road in 1881 to facilitate the building of railway tunnels and remained in operation until 1933. A smaller brickyard operated near Parham Road from 1884 to 1930. Nearby in Wade Road is Seaview, the oldest known residence in Eden Hills, built in 1849.

== Places of interest ==
Blackwood High School, 1st Eden Hills Scout Group Blackwood Primary School and Eden Hills Primary School are located in Eden Hills. Eden Hills railway station is on the Belair railway line. Eden Hills also has a Country Fire Service Station, established in 1951.

=== Eden Hills Scout Group ===
A part of Scouts SA, and the World Scouting Movement. It has been providing opportunities for youth in the local community to experience the outdoors and undergo leadership development. It has had a significant impact on the local community through service projects such as cleaning up the land by Eden Hills Station, fundraising for the droughts and teaching youth to be global citizens.

=== Watiparinga Reserve ===
Watiparinga Reserve and adjacent land near Gloucester Avenue in Eden Hills was added to the Register of the National Estate in 1996. It comprises approximately 32 hectares (79 acres) and is considered a significant cultural landscape, exhibiting a diverse range of flora and provides an early example of nature conservation efforts in South Australia from the 1950s. The Reserve also contains remnants of the original 1880s Adelaide to Melbourne railway line, including an original single-track tunnel and concrete viaduct buttresses. The Reserve contains the first National Trust of South Australia plaque to be erected, which was unveiled in 1959.

Watiparinga Reserve was developed as farmland in 1850–51. The South Australian Railways bought some of the land for the single-track railway line and viaduct in 1880. In 1911, the farmland was acquired by Ernest Saunders and Edwin Ashby. During World War II, the former railway tunnel in the reserve was used for safe storage of South Australian art treasures and is now used to grow mushrooms commercially. The property was transferred to Ashby in 1922 and farmed as part of his Wittunga property. In the late 1950s, daughter Alison Marjorie Ashby began planting thousands of seedlings of Australian plants in Watiparinga. She eventually donated Watiparinga to the National Trust of South Australia in 1957.

=== Wittunga Botanic Garden ===
The Wittunga Botanic Garden, in the southeastern corner of the suburb and extending east into Blackwood, was also part of Edwin Ashby's Wittunga property. Originally a formal English garden at Ashby's home, his son Arthur Keith Ashby later included South African and native Australian plants. The garden was donated to the State in 1965, and is now administered as one of the three Botanic Gardens in Adelaide, the others being the Adelaide Botanic Garden and the Mount Lofty Botanic Garden.

=== Colebrook Reconciliation Park ===
Colebrook Reconciliation Park in Eden Hills was established from 1998 as a memorial to the Aboriginal children who were removed from their families and housed at Colebrook Home. This was a United Aborigines Mission establishment which had originated in Oodnadatta in 1924, moved to Quorn, then relocated to Eden Hills in 1942. At its Eden Hills location, Colebrook Home continued to house children, including prominent health worker and public administrator Lowitja O'Donoghue. By 1956 the property was in poor condition and the home was finally closed in 1972 and later demolished. The remaining few children were housed at Blackwood, where the Colebrook Home remained until its final closure in 1981.

The Reconciliation Park was borne out of meetings in the 1990s between a local reconciliation study group, the Blackwood Reconciliation Group (BRG), and the Tji Tji Tjuta (former residents) of Colebrook Home. This led to the establishment of memorial works, including Fountain of Tears, created in 1998 by Silvio Apponyi and Kaurna artist Shereen Rankine, and Grieving Mother in 1999, by Apponyi and Rankine along with Yankunytjatjara artists Tjula Jane Pole and Kunyi June-Anne McInerney.

There are two plaques bearing poems in the park, written by former Colebrook residents. One is written by Doreen Kartinyeri:

We are the stolen children who were taken away torn from our mothers` breasts.
What can a child do?
Where can a child turn?
Where is the guiding hand a child is meant to have?

The other is by Avis Edwards:

"My baby, my baby, please give back my baby."
A mother`s words fall upon the deaf ears of authority.
Hearts break, tears fall, fear cries out from wrenched hands and arms of a mother and child, separated.
Feel the pain, touch the ache, caress the tears.
Through ignorance and indifference came the disruption and destruction of family life.
