= Lower Mitcham, South Australia =

Lower Mitcham
- Suburb
- Coordinates: 34°58′52″S 138°36′21″E
- Country: Australia
- State: South Australia
- City: Adelaide
- LGA: City of Mitcham

Government
  - State electorate: Elder
  - Federal division: Boothby

Population
  - Total: 2,187 (SAL 2021)
- Postcode: 5062
Suburbs around Lower Mitcham
Westbourne Park	Hawthorn	Kingswood
Colonel Light Gardens	Lower Mitcham	Torrens Park
Colonel Light Gardens	Clapham	Torrens Park

Lower Mitcham is an inner southern suburb of Adelaide, South Australia in the local government area of Mitcham. To the north, it is bounded by Grange Road, to the east by Belair Road, to the south by Murray Street. To the west, the suburb is bordered by a line running from Murray Street along View Street and continuing north to Grange Road.

There is only one institution in the suburb, the former Mitcham Primary School, which is now a Community Centre. There are no surviving shops in commercial use, there is a Guild Hall on Wattle Street, and there is the Mitcham Railway Station. There is a small sports (tennis) centre on Denman Terrace. All other buildings in the suburb are private residences. Many of the homes were built in the 1920s in the California Bungalow style.

== History ==
Prior to European settlement the area was occupied by the Kaurna people, the traditional owners and custodians of the Adelaide Plains.

In 1854 Henry W Parker bought 12 acres (Lots 22-25) and built 'Wattlebury' in 1864.

Wattlebury House
