= Mitcham railway station, Adelaide =

Railway station in Adelaide, South Australia

Mitcham
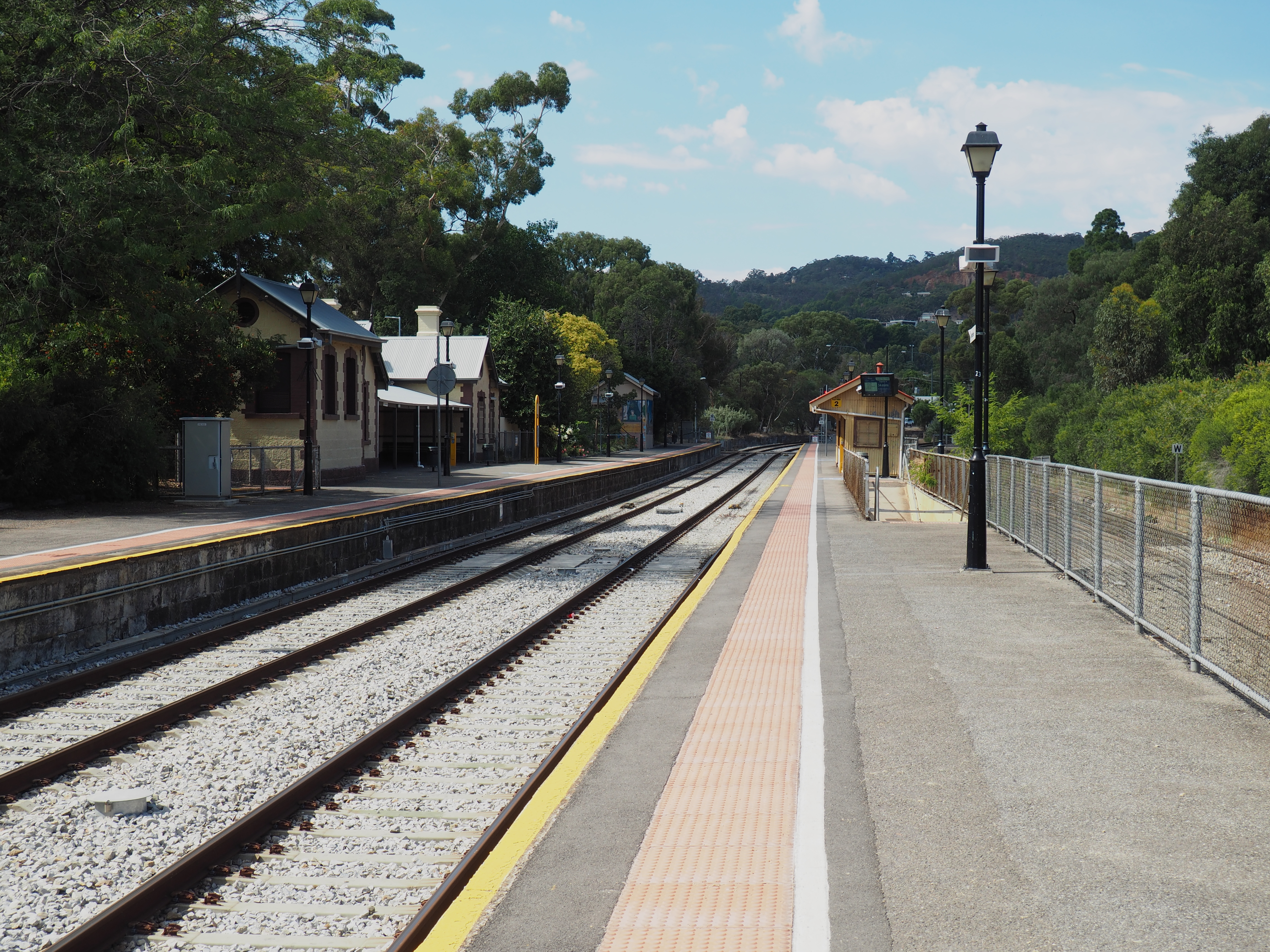
- Southbound view from Platform 1, March 2016

General information
- Location: Grange Road, Lower Mitcham
- Coordinates: 34°58′38″S 138°36′31″E
- Owner: Department for Infrastructure and Transport
- Operator: Adelaide Metro
- Line: Belair
- Distance: 8.5 km from Adelaide
- Platforms: 2 Side
- Tracks: 3
- Connections: Bus

Construction
- Structure type: Ground
- Parking: Yes
- Cycle facilities: Yes
- Accessible: Yes

Other information
- Station code: 16543 (to City); 18578 (to Belair)
- Website: Adelaide Metro

History
- Opened: 1883

Services
Preceding station	Adelaide Metro	Following station
Unley Park towards Adelaide	Belair line	Torrens Park towards Belair
Location

Mitcham railway station is located on the Belair line in Adelaide. Situated 8.5 kilometres from Adelaide station, it is in the suburb of Lower Mitcham.

== History ==
Mitcham station opened in March 1883 with the opening of the Adelaide to Aldgate section of the Adelaide-Melbourne line. It was originally planned to call the station Lower Mitcham but the name was changed prior to opening. It was previously served by the Melbourne Express. Mitcham previously was a junction for lines to Clapham and Sleeps Hill. It is currently a stop on the Belair suburban commuter line. Mitcham and Blackwood are the only stations between Goodwood and Belair to have more than one platform in use.

In 1995, as part of the One Nation Adelaide-Melbourne line gauge conversion project, the third platform on the station's western side was converted to standard gauge.

The Mitcham railway station garden, known as Nellie's Garden, is named in honour of Nellie Iris Ellis (1920-1983) who established the garden. Mrs Ellis was the wife of a former stationmaster. The garden is maintained by volunteers and is one of only five public gardens provided by the City of Mitcham.

In 2019, portions of Escape from Pretoria, a 2020 Australian prison film, was shot at the station and Nellie's Garden. During this time, trains did not stop at Mitcham.

== Services by platform ==
Platform	Destination/s
1	Adelaide/Belair
2	Adelaide/Belair

== Bus transfers ==
Bus transfers: Stop 13B (Grange Road)
Route no.	Destination & route details
190	City – Mitcham – Glenelg

Bus transfers: Stop 14 (Belair Road)
Route no.	Destination & route details
195	City – Mitcham – Blackwood
196	City – Mitcham – Blackwood
300	Suburban Connector
892	Urrbrae High School – Mitcham – Blackwood
