= Eden Hills railway station =

Railway station in Adelaide, South Australia

Eden Hills
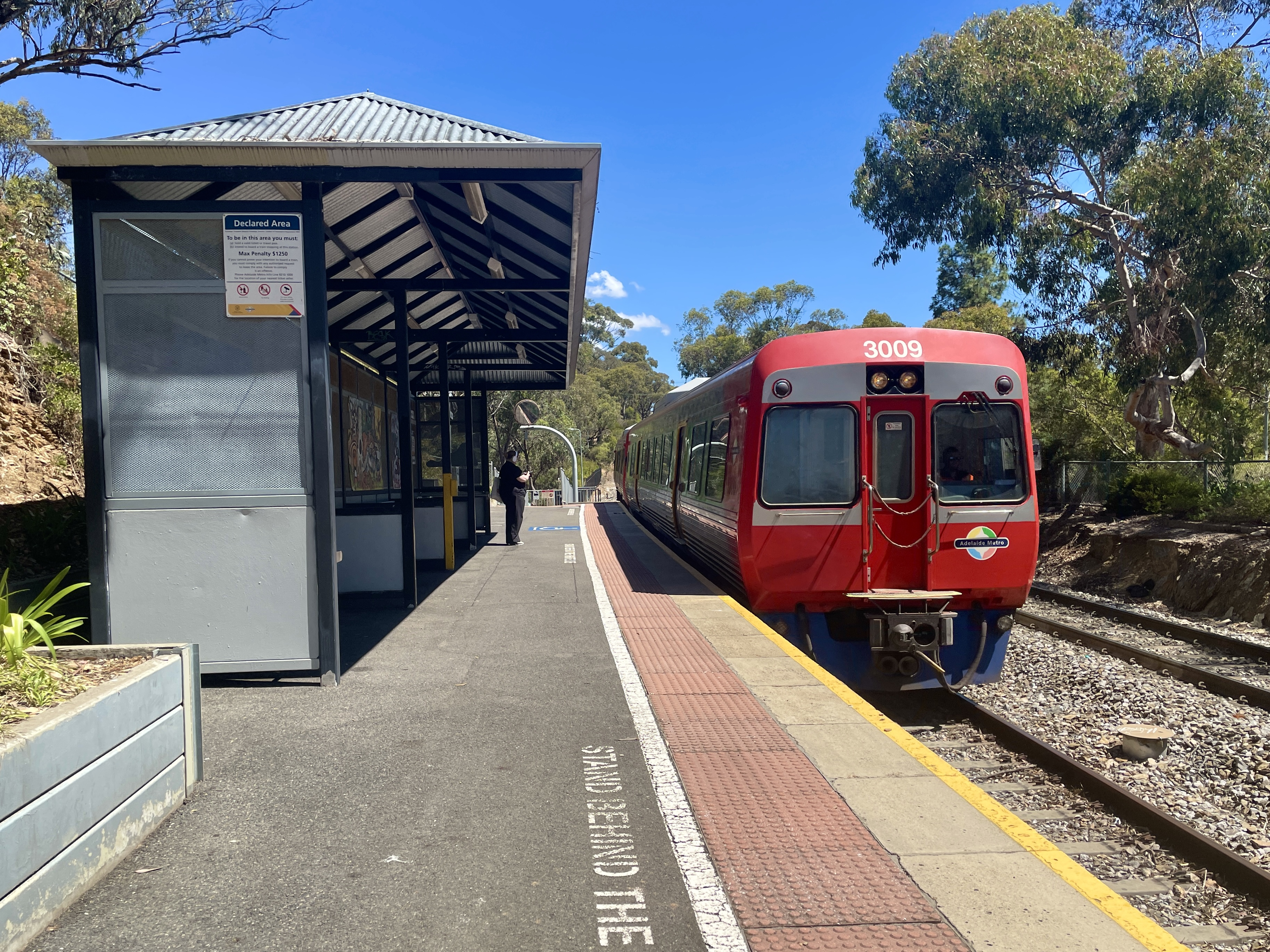
- Southbound view of a train arriving at the station, December 2024

General information
- Location: Willowie Street, Eden Hills
- Coordinates: 35°01′18″S 138°35′39″E
- Elevation: 595 feet (181 m)
- Owner: Department for Infrastructure and Transport
- Operator: Adelaide Metro
- Line: Belair
- Distance: 14.2 km from Adelaide
- Platforms: 1
- Connections: None

Construction
- Structure type: Ground
- Parking: Yes
- Cycle facilities: Yes
- Accessible: Yes

Other information
- Station code: 16510 (to City); 18575 (to Belair)
- Website: Adelaide Metro

History
- Opened: 1 April 1912
- Rebuilt: 1990s and 2009

Services
Preceding station	Adelaide Metro	Following station
Lynton towards Adelaide	Belair line	Coromandel towards Belair
Location

Eden Hills railway station is located on the Belair line. Situated in the Adelaide southern foothills suburb of Eden Hills, it is 14.2 kilometres from Adelaide station.

== History ==
Eden Hills is the only station on the Adelaide Metro to have a tunnel on both approaches. The original line through Eden Hills was opened in 1883, as part of the Adelaide to Nairne railway. However, this station was not opened until 1 April 1912 and originally named Eden. Prior to that, there was no station between Mitcham and Blackwood, although the train would slow through Eden Hills, allowing passengers to drop off parcels and bags to persons standing along the line. The station once had a ticket office and shelter on the former eastern platform, like the one at Long Gully, and a shelter on the western platform.

The western platform shelter and ticket office were demolished in 1984. The shelter on the eastern platform was replaced in 2009. As part of the renewal of the Belair line in 2009, improvements to access ramps, seating, fencing, lighting, signage and safety markings have taken place at Eden Hills.

== Services by platform ==
Platform	Destination/s
1	Adelaide/Belair
