= Pasadena, South Australia =

Pasadena
- Suburb
- Coordinates: 35°00′07″S 138°35′24″E
- Country: Australia
- State: South Australia
- City: Adelaide
- LGA: City of Mitcham

Government
  - State electorate: Elder
  - Federal division: Boothby

Population
  - Total: 3,073 (SAL 2021)
- Postcode: 5042
Suburbs around Pasadena
Melrose Park	Daw Park	Colonel Light Gardens
St Marys	Pasadena	Panorama
Bellevue Heights	Eden Hills

Pasadena is an inner southern suburb of Adelaide, South Australia in the City of Mitcham.

== History ==
Panorama Post Office opened on 1 August 1947 and was renamed Pasadena in 1982.

== Facilities ==
- Centennial Park Cemetery
- Naomi Reserve
- Springbank Secondary College, former known as Daws Road High School (1964–2001) and Pasadena High School (2001–2019)
- Saddie Hill Reserve
- Pasadena Shopping Centre and Foodland, formerly Big Crow Supermarket. The original 1970s shopping centre featured a Woolworths supermarket and specialty stores. In 2011 the centre underwent redevelopment and renaming to Pasadena Green Shopping Centre. The redevelopment includes a new church facility for Southland Vineyard Church.
- Air-Stream Community Wireless Access Point
- Trinity Lutheran Church (a member of the Lutheran Church of Australia), and Trinity Place (Pasadena Lutheran Aged Care Environs), its aged care facility
