= Glenalta railway station =

Railway station in Adelaide, South Australia

Glenalta
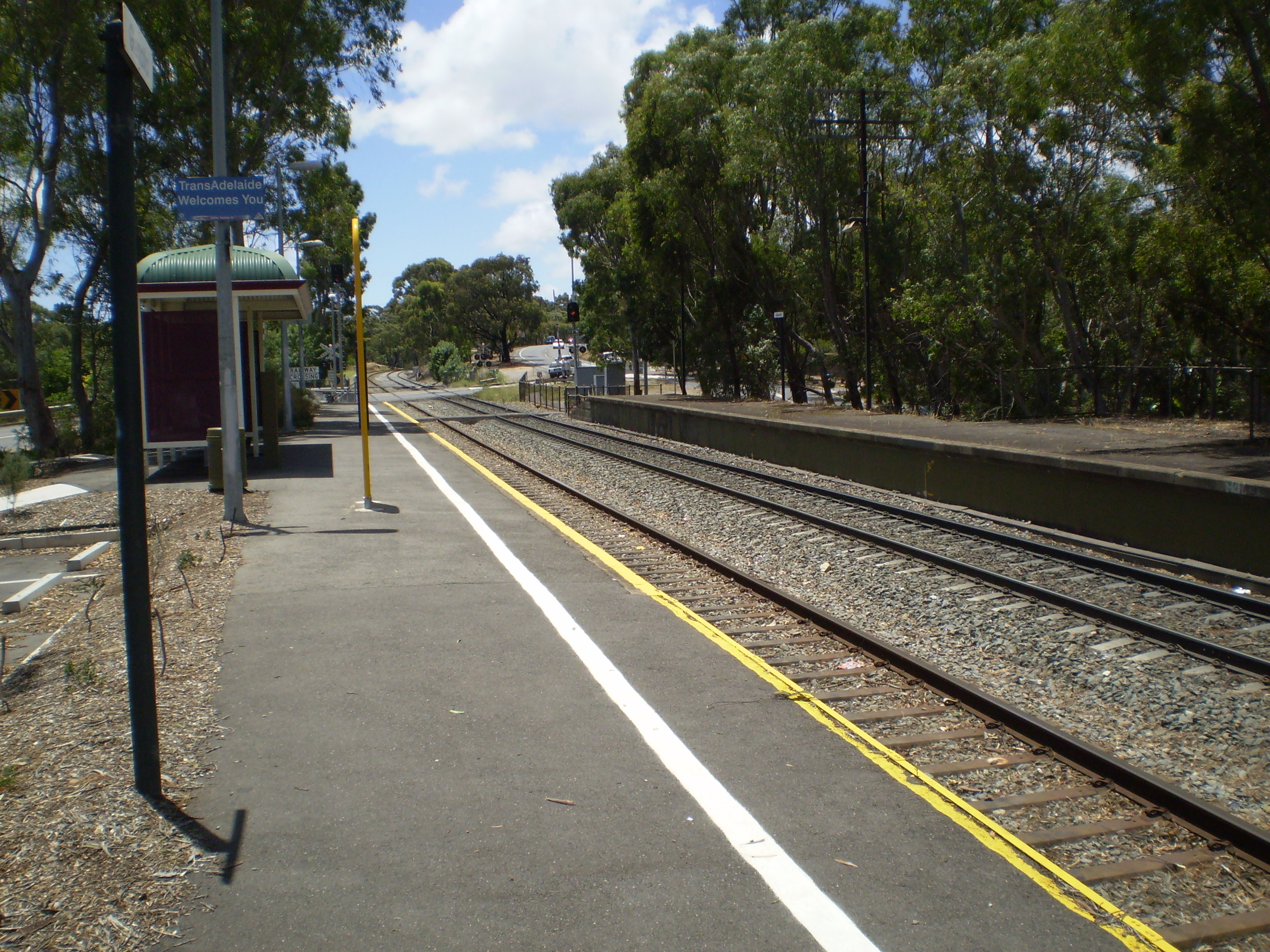
- Northbound view from Platform 1, December 2007

General information
- Location: Main Road, Glenalta
- Coordinates: 35°00′41″S 138°37′24″E
- Owner: Department for Infrastructure and Transport
- Operator: Adelaide Metro
- Line: Belair
- Distance: 19.3 km from Adelaide
- Platforms: 2 (1 disused)
- Connections: Bus

Construction
- Structure type: Ground
- Parking: Yes
- Cycle facilities: No
- Accessible: Yes

Other information
- Station code: 16521 (to City); 18572 (to Belair)
- Website: Adelaide Metro

Services
Preceding station	Adelaide Metro	Following station
Blackwood towards Adelaide	Belair line	Pinera towards Belair
Location

Glenalta railway station is located on the Belair line. Situated in the Adelaide southern foothills suburb of Glenalta, it is 19.3 kilometres from Adelaide station.

== History ==
Genalta station opened as Belair Road.

In 1995, the eastern side platform was closed when the inbound line was converted to standard gauge as part of the One Nation Adelaide-Melbourne line gauge conversion project. During the late 1990s/early 2000s, the original down shelter was replaced with the current shelter.

== Services by platform ==
Platform	Destination/s	Notes
1	Adelaide/Belair	
2		Not in use

== Transport links ==
Bus transfers: Stop Stop 28 (Main Road)
Route no.	Destination & route details
173	City via Old Belair Road
173	Blackwood station via Main Road
197X	Coromandel Station via Main Road
197X	City via Main & Belair Roads
893	Blackwood station via Main Road
893	Aldgate via Blackwood station & Upper Sturt Road
