= Panorama, South Australia =

Panorama
- Suburb
- Coordinates: 34°59′42″S 138°35′49″E
- Country: Australia
- State: South Australia
- City: Adelaide
- LGA: City of Mitcham

Government
  - State electorate: Elder
  - Federal division: Boothby

Population
  - Total: 2,388 (SAL 2021)
- Postcode: 5041
Suburbs around Panorama
Daw Park	Colonel Light Gardens	Clapham
Pasadena	Panorama	Clapham; Lynton; Belair
Eden Hills	Eden Hills	Blackwood

Panorama is a suburb of Adelaide, South Australia, in the City of Mitcham. Its boundaries are Springbank Road Goodwood Road, the railway line to the east and the quarry reserve in the south.

== History ==
Originally named "Spring Hill" or "Springbank" because of the naturally occurring Spring located in the Hills behind it, the name was changed to Panorama after the residents of nearby Springfield complained that the names were too similar and the cause of much confusion.

The village of Springbank was advertised for auction in 1848. It was described as "the beautiful village of Springbank ... lies about four miles to the south and can be reached by half-a-dozen roads from Adelaide. Each allotment is partly enclosed, containing from five to ten acres of rich cultivated land, from which a fine view of the sea is enjoyed."

In 1853 there were 11 households, mostly huts, registered in the first Council Rate Assessment, with 5 classed as dwellings. Panorama Estate was created when subdivision began in the southern area in 1924. Eleven divisions of the twenty four were completed by 1930 but because of the Great Depression and the Second World War they were not continued until 1948. Cowan Building was built in 1950 by Bedford Industries as a sheltered workshop.

Panorama Post Office opened on 1 August 1947 and was renamed Pasadena in 1982.
