= Lynton railway station =

Railway station in Adelaide, South Australia

Lynton
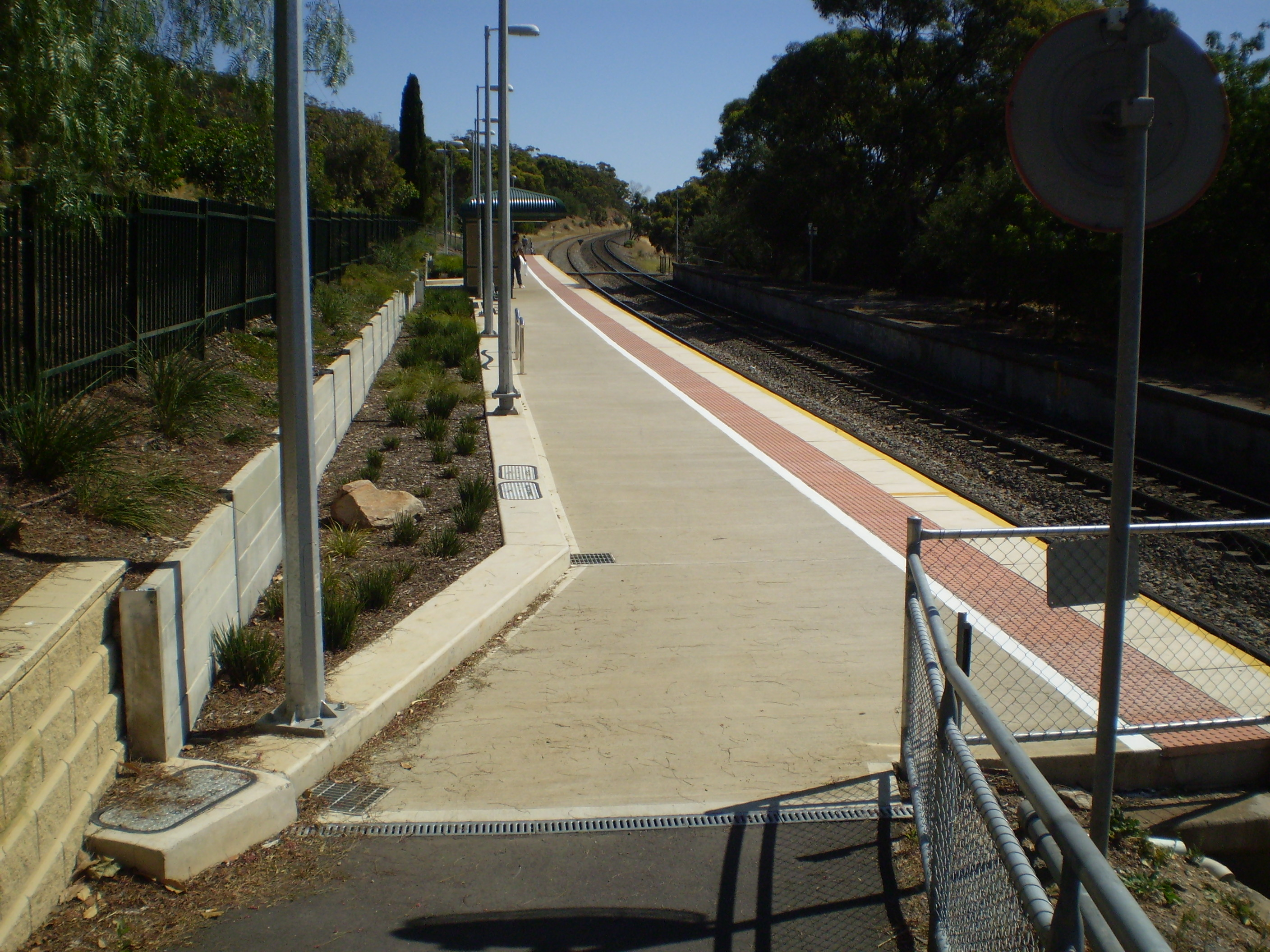
- Southbound view from the station platform, November 2007

General information
- Location: Beagle Terrace, Lynton
- Coordinates: 34°59′43″S 138°36′21″E
- Owner: Department for Infrastructure & Transport
- Operator: Adelaide Metro
- Line: Belair
- Distance: 10.7 km from Adelaide
- Platforms: 2 (1 disused)
- Tracks: 2
- Connections: None

Construction
- Structure type: Ground
- Parking: No
- Cycle facilities: Yes
- Accessible: Yes

Other information
- Station code: 16536 (to City); 18576 (to Belair)
- Website: Adelaide Metro

History
- Opened: 1946
- Rebuilt: 2007

Services
Preceding station	Adelaide Metro	Following station
Torrens Park towards Adelaide	Belair line	Eden Hills towards Belair
Location

Lynton railway station is located on the Belair line between the Adelaide southern foothills suburbs of Lynton and Clapham, 10.7 kilometres from Adelaide station.

== History ==
The station was opened in 1946, replacing the Sleeps Hill halt which was provided with step-down platforms south of the Sleeps Hill Quarry Sidings, approximately 500 metres south of Lynton station.

In 1995, the western side platform was closed when the inbound line was converted to standard gauge as part of the One Nation Adelaide-Melbourne line gauge conversion project. The eastern side platform was rebuilt in 2007.

== Services by platform ==
Platform	Destination/s	Notes
1	Adelaide/Belair	
2		Not in use
