= Blackwood railway station, Adelaide =

Railway station in Adelaide, South Australia

Blackwood
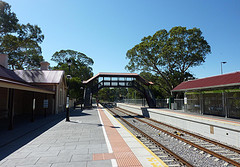
- Northbound view from Platform 1, September 2011

General information
- Location: Station Road, Blackwood
- Coordinates: 35°01′15″S 138°37′09″E
- System: Railway station and bus interchange
- Owner: Department for Infrastructure & Transport
- Operator: Adelaide Metro
- Line: Belair
- Distance: 5.9 km from Adelaide
- Platforms: 2
- Tracks: 3
- Connections: Bus

Construction
- Structure type: Ground
- Parking: Yes
- Cycle facilities: Yes
- Accessible: Yes

Other information
- Station code: 16495 (to City); 18573 (to Belair)
- Website: Adelaide Metro

History
- Opened: 1883
- Rebuilt: 1990s and 2009

Services
Preceding station	Adelaide Metro	Following station
Coromandel towards Adelaide	Belair line	Glenalta towards Belair
Location

Blackwood railway station is located on the Belair line in Adelaide. Situated 18 kilometres from Adelaide station, it is in the southern foothills suburb of Blackwood.

== History ==
Blackwood station opened in 1883 with the opening of the Adelaide to Aldgate section of the Adelaide-Melbourne line. On 18 June 1928, it became the temporary terminus of the double track section from Eden Hills. On 24 June 1928, it was extended through to Belair. In 1940, a footbridge was added.

Blackwood is one of the busiest stations on the Belair line, and it is the only station on the line to have a bus interchange with connections available with many routes. Also, it and Mitcham are the only stations between Goodwood and Belair to have more than one platform in use to allow services to pass. Blackwood is also the only station where trains mostly use the right platform as opposed to the left. After Blackwood station, between Blackwood and Belair there is no loop to allow more than one train to pass.

In 1995, as part of the One Nation Adelaide-Melbourne line gauge conversion project, a standard gauge line was laid on the eastern side of the station. In 2009, the station was given a facelift.

== Services by platforms ==
Platform	Destination/s
1	Adelaide/Belair
2	Adelaide/Belair

== Transport links ==
Several bus routes operate from the nearby Blackwood Interchange. The interchange is also served by school bus services, however, these are not accessible to the general public.

Bus transfers: Stop Zone A Blackwood Interchange
Route no.	Destination & route details
173	Blackwood Interchange to City via Main Rd, Belair Rd, Blythewood Rd and Fullarton Rd
195	Blackwood Interchange to City via Hawthorndene, Belair Rd, Mitcham Square and Unley Rd
196	Blackwood Interchange to City via Hawthorndene, Gloucester Ave, Mitcham Square and Unley Rd

Bus transfers: Stop Zone B Blackwood Interchange
Route no.	Destination & route details
600	Old Reynella Interchange to Marion Centre Interchange
601	Old Reynella Interchange to Marion Centre Interchange
893	Aldgate to Blackwood
894	Aldgate to Blackwood Interchange

Bus transfers: Stop Zone C Blackwood Interchange
Route no.	Destination & route details
600S	Blackwood Interchange to Bedford Park
G30F	Blackwood Interchange to City
