= Clapham railway station, Adelaide =

Former railway station in South Australia, Australia

Coordinates: 34°59′22″S 138°36′32″E

Clapham
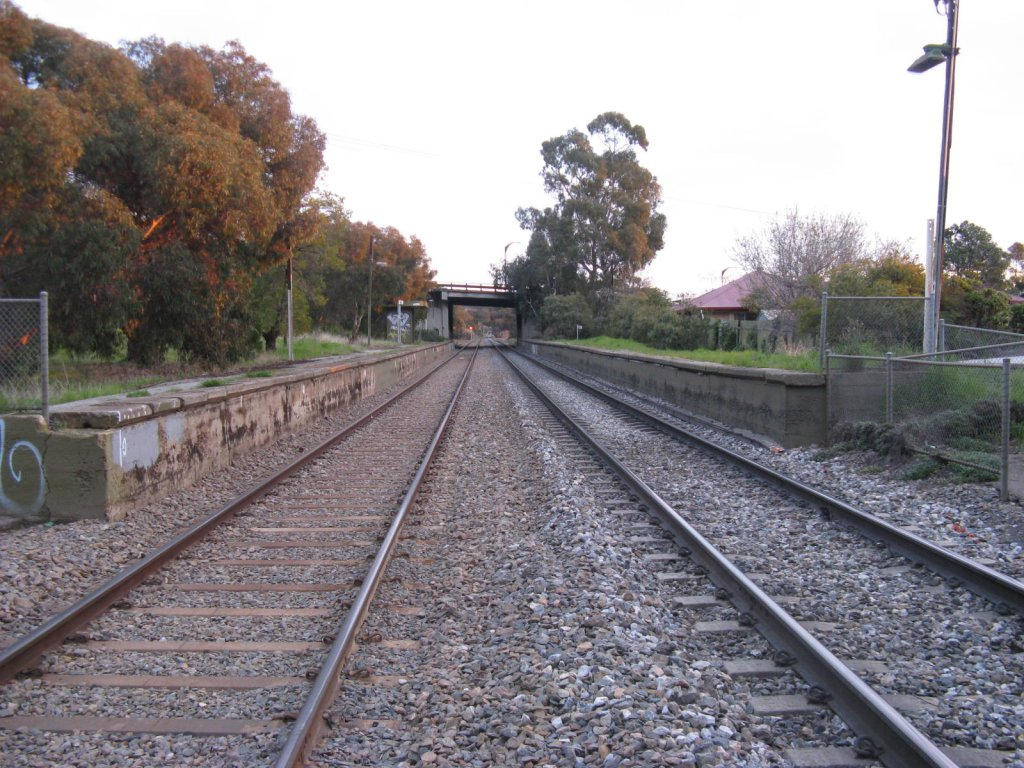

General information
- Location: Clapham
- Line: Belair Line
- Distance: 10 kilometres (6.2 mi) from Adelaide
- Platforms: 2
- Bus routes: n/a

Construction
- Parking: n/a
- Cycle facilities: n/a

History
- Opened: 1908
- Closed: 28 April 1995

Services
Preceding station	TransAdelaide	Following station
Torrens Park towards Adelaide	Belair line	Lynton towards Belair
Location

Clapham railway station was located on the Belair line in the inner southern Adelaide suburb of Clapham, 10 kilometres (6.2 mi) from Adelaide railway station.

== History ==
Clapham was opened in 1908. The station consists of two earth-filled concrete faced platforms, one each side of the dual lines, which were originally both broad gauge. Each platform had a timber and iron open passenger shelter, and there was a ticket office at the foot of the western platform which was staffed only at peak hours in the 1960s. There was a shelter, bench, and public address speaker on the down platform.

Between its opening in 1908 and 1915, the Clapham railway station was located approximately 150 metres west of its final location. A short branch line diverged from the Belair line along what is now Price Avenue, terminating just north of Springbank Road. This allowed trains to terminate at Clapham without obstructing trains on the main line - the Clapham passenger service was typically a P class locomotive with a couple of carriages, and was known as the Clapham Dodger. In 1915 the Clapham station was moved to its final location on the main line.

It closed on 28 April 1995 along with Millswood and Hawthorn when the line was converted to two single lines as part of the standardisation of the Adelaide-Wolseley line. During the Belair line renewal in 2009, the top edge of the eastbound platform was removed because of the risk of it being struck by passing trains.

== Select bibliography ==
- Callaghan WH. The overland railway. ARHS NSW, St James. 1992.
- Eardley, G. "The P class locomotives of South Australia." ARHS bulletin 416, June, 1972.
- Jennings R. Line clear: 100 years of train working Adelaide-Serviceton. Mile End Railway Museum, Roseworthy. 1986.
- Smith P., Piddock S., Pate D. Historic sites and landscapes - the Mitcham Hills. Department of Archaeology, Flinders University. 2005.
