= Torrens Park railway station =

Railway station in Adelaide, South Australia

Coordinates: 34.9839°S 138.6111°E

Torrens Park
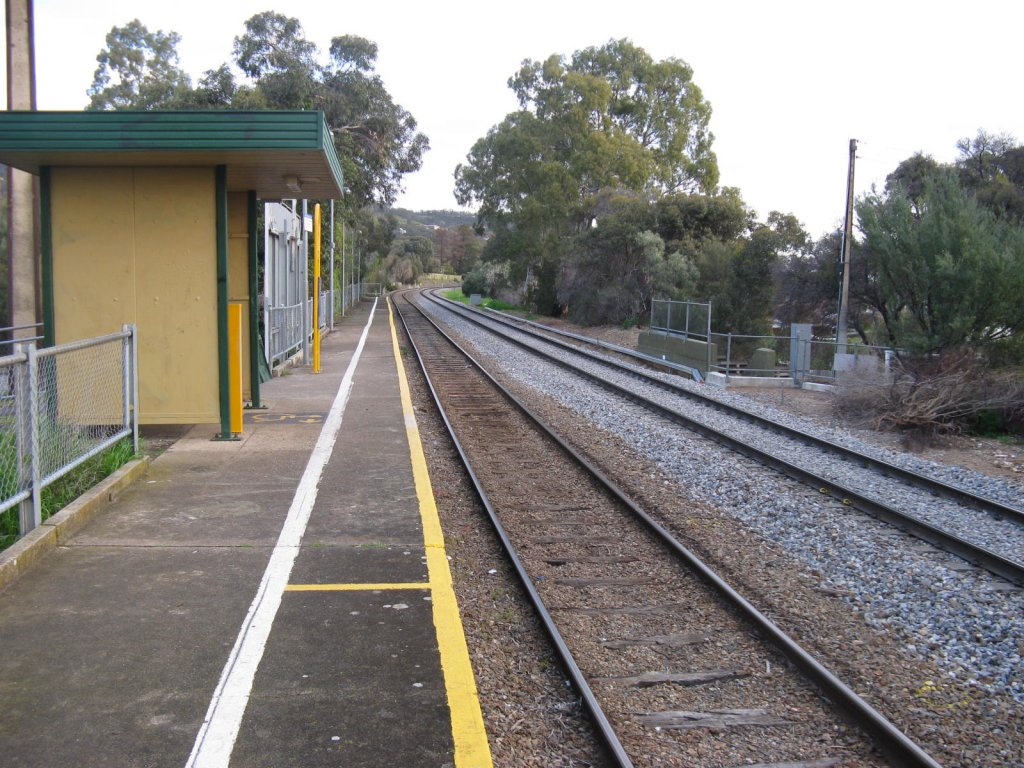
- Southbound view from the station platform, August 2008

General information
- Location: Belair Road, Torrens Park
- Owner: Department for Infrastructure and Transport
- Operator: Adelaide Metro
- Line: Belair
- Distance: 9.3 km from Adelaide
- Platforms: 1
- Connections: Bus

Construction
- Structure type: Ground
- Parking: Yes
- Cycle facilities: No
- Accessible: Yes

Other information
- Station code: 16565 (to City); 18577 (to Belair)
- Website: Adelaide Metro

History
- Opened: 1914

Services
Preceding station	Adelaide Metro	Following station
Mitcham towards Adelaide	Belair line	Lynton towards Belair
Location

Torrens Park railway station is located on the Belair line in suburban Adelaide in South Australia. Located 9.3 kilometres from Adelaide station, it serves the inner southern suburb of Torrens Park.

== History ==
The station opened in 1914 as Blythwood, being renamed Torrens Park in 1921. In 1992, the Australian Plants Society commenced the Torrens Park Railway Station Project which made the surrounding area look much more attractive.

In 1995, the western side platform was closed when the inbound line was converted to standard gauge as part of the One Nation Adelaide-Melbourne line gauge conversion project. The disused platform was demolished in March 2008.

== Services by platform ==
Platform	Destination/s
1	Adelaide/Belair

== Transport links ==
Bus transfers: Stop 16 (Belair Road)
Route no.	Destination & route details
195	City – Mitcham – Blackwood
196	City – Mitcham – Blackwood
300	Suburban Connector

== Gallery ==
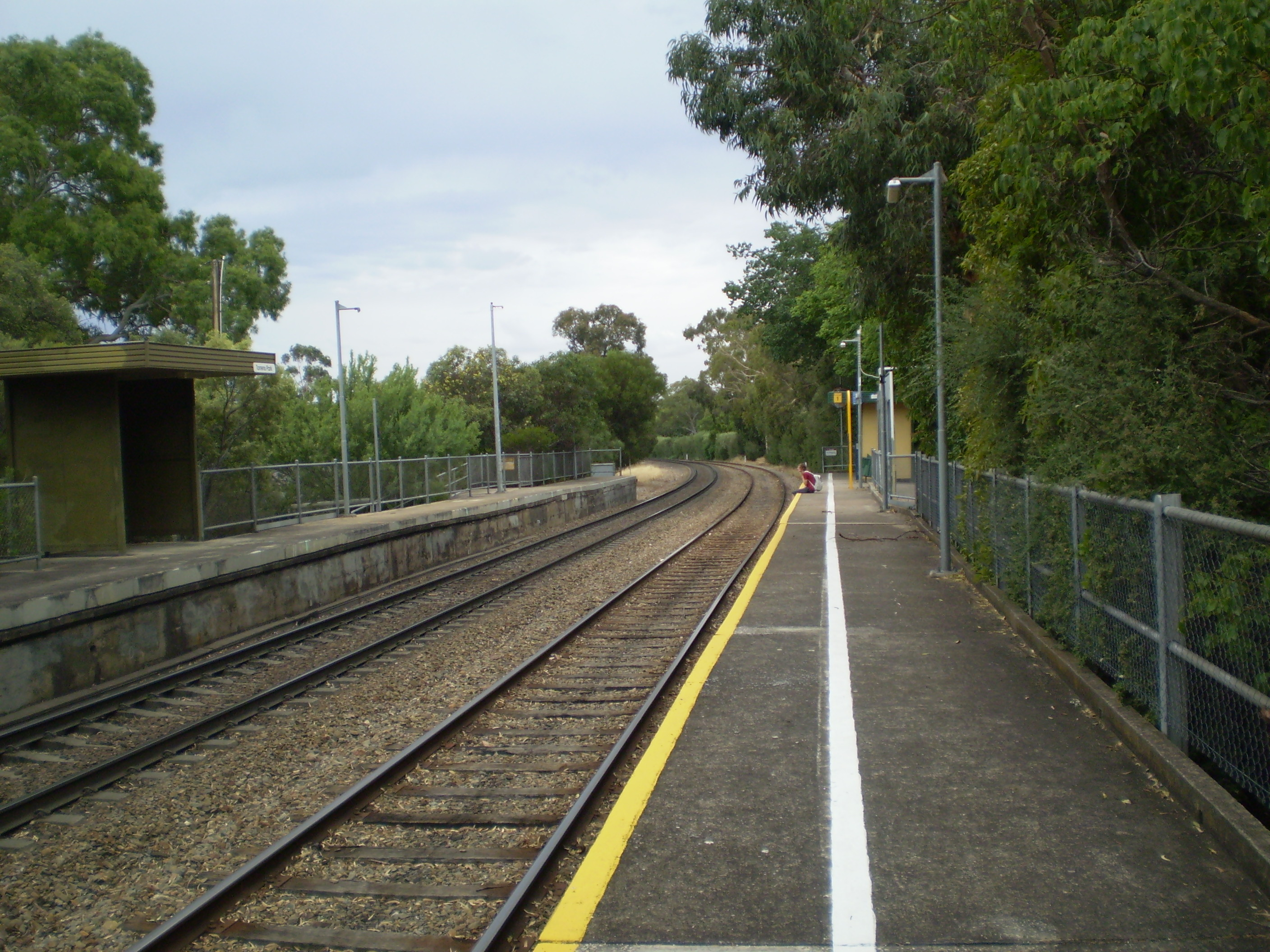
Northbound view from Platform 1, December 2007. Prior to the western platform (left) being demolished in early 2008

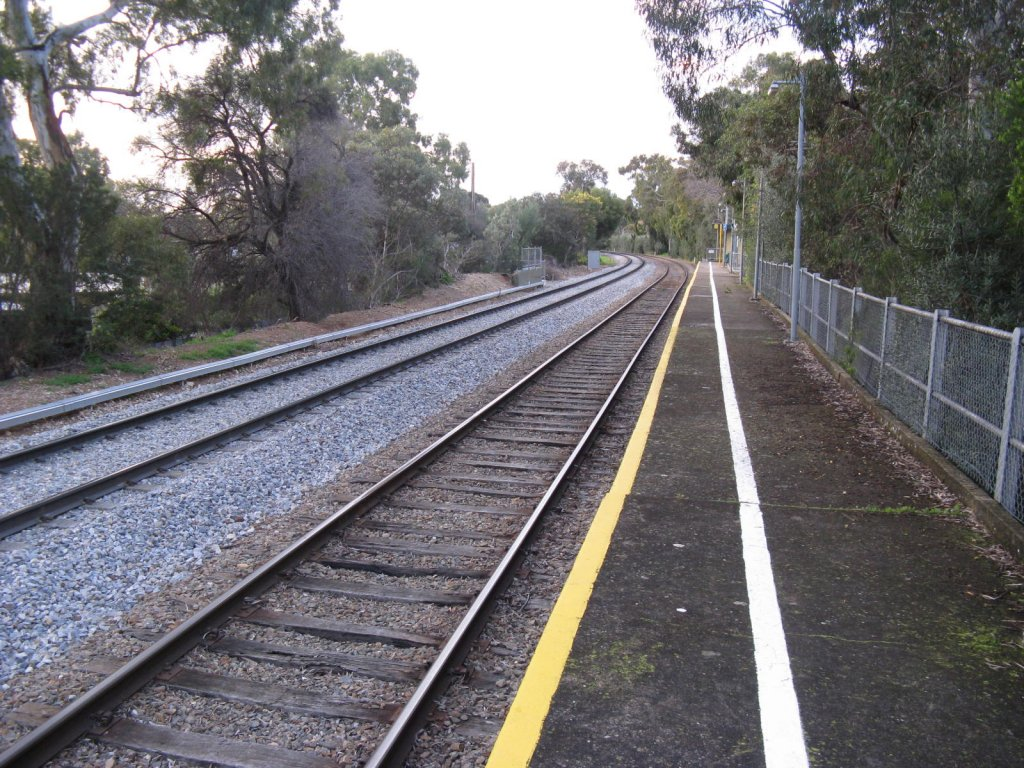
Northbound view from the station platform, August 2008

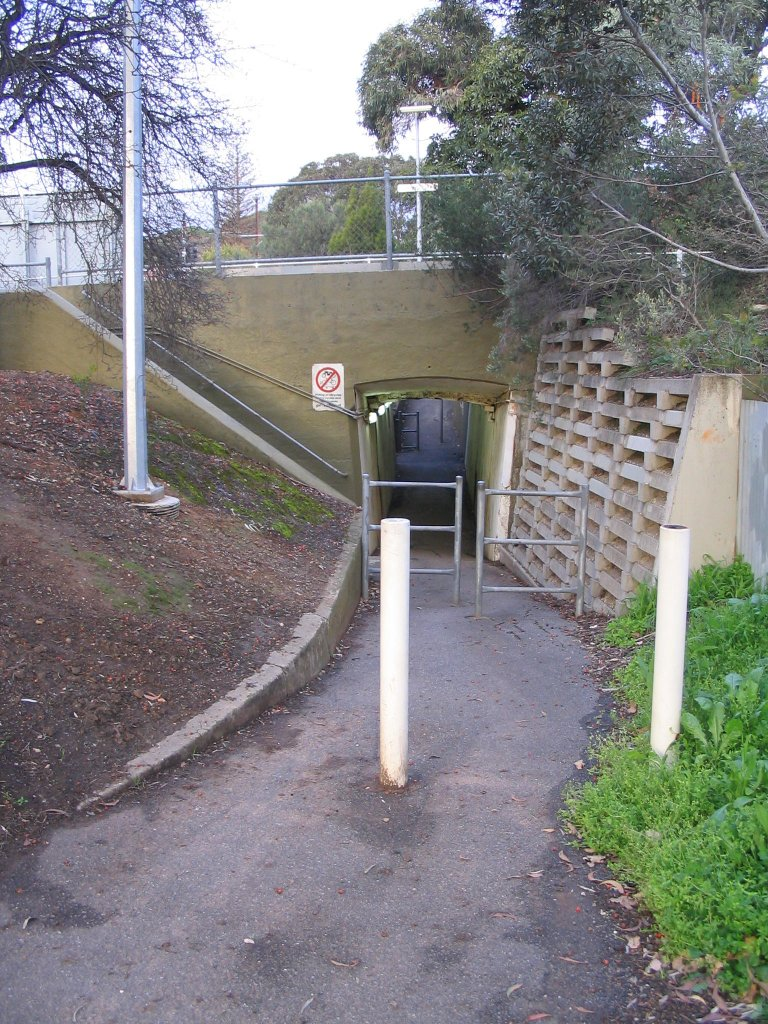
Pedestrian underpass, August 2008

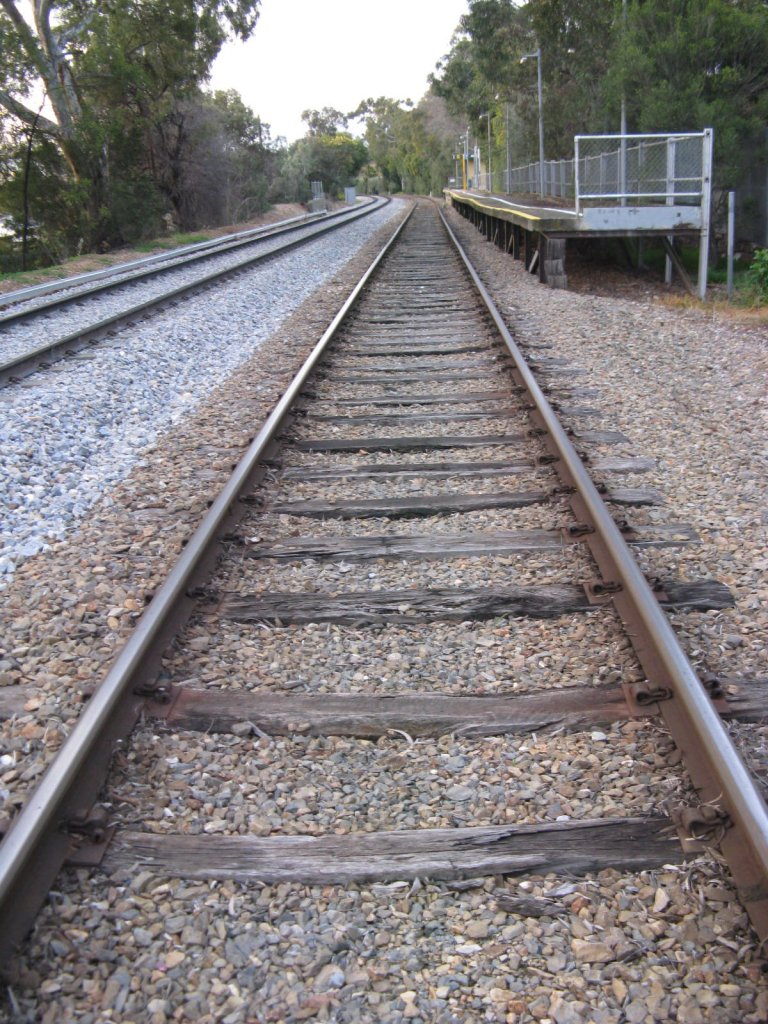
Wooden sleepers on broad gauge track,
August 2008

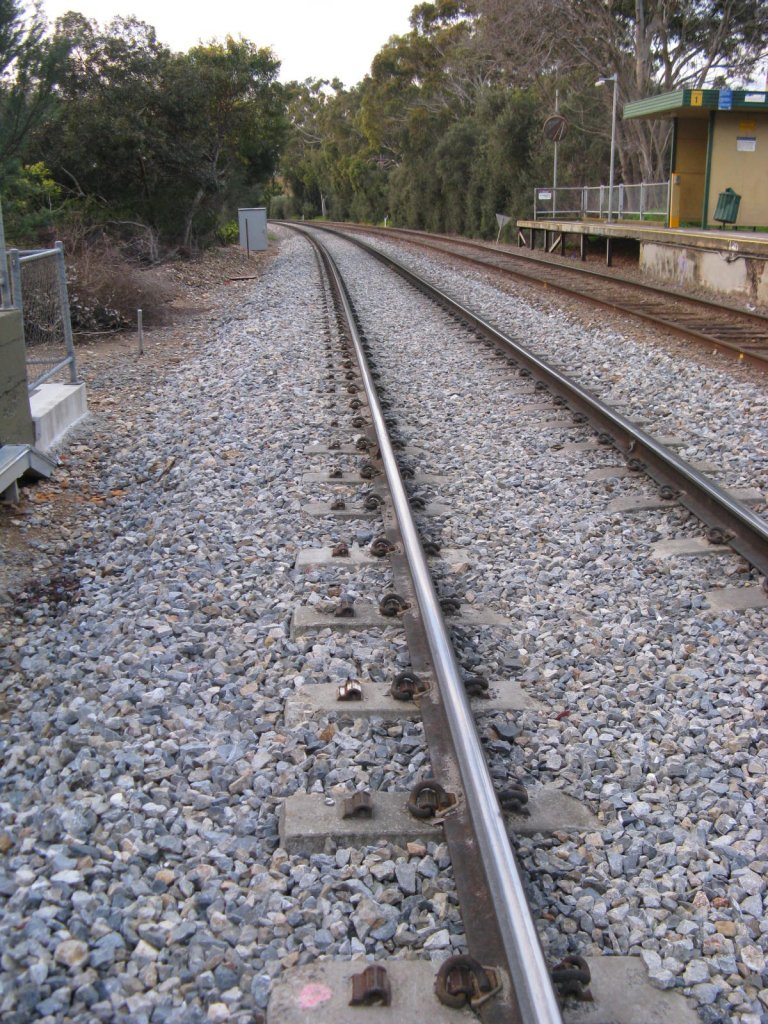
Standard gauge track on dual gauge concrete sleepers, August 2008
