= Belair line =

Rail line in Adelaide, South Australia

Coordinates: 34.9926°S 138.6324°E

Overview
- Locale: Adelaide, South Australia
- Termini: Adelaide; Belair
- Stations: 15

Service
- Type: Commuter rail
- Route number: BEL
- Operator: Adelaide Metro
- Rolling stock: 3000/3100 class

History
- Opened: 1883
- Re-sleepered (concrete): April–August 2009
- partly Electrified (Adelaide–Goodwood): January–July 2013

Technical
- Line length: 21.5 km (13.4 mi)
- Number of tracks: 2 (to Adelaide Showground); 1 (to Belair)
- Track gauge: 1600 mm (5 ft 3 in)
- Electrification: only partial: 25 kV 50 Hz AC from overhead catenary (Adelaide–Goodwood)

The Belair line is the route of a suburban rail passenger service in greater Adelaide, South Australia. It runs from the Adelaide railway station to Belair in the Adelaide Hills. The service is provided by diesel-electric 3000/3100 class railcars.

In 1987, the Adelaide–Bridgewater passenger service was cut back to Belair, which was about half-way to Bridgewater. Beyond Bridgewater, the broad-gauge route continued as the main line to Melbourne. When that route was converted to 1435 mm (4 ft 8 1/2 in) standard gauge in 1995, the Belair–Bridgewater broad-gauge track was removed, providing space for the standard-gauge track. The latter carries freight except for four long-distance passenger trains per week; it does not connect with Adelaide Metro's suburban network, which remains broad-gauge.

== History ==
The first part of the Adelaide-Wolseley line – from Adelaide to Belair and Bridgewater – opened in 1883. In 1919, a new alignment was built around Sleeps Hill as part of the duplication of the line. This involved a double-track tunnel being built to replace two tunnels and two viaducts. The new alignment was also 400 metres (1300 feet) shorter. In 1928, the line was duplicated from Eden Hills to Blackwood and on to Belair.

State Transport Authority passenger services ceased beyond Belair in 1987. In 1995, the track used by Adelaide-bound services was converted to standard gauge as part of the Adelaide to Melbourne standardisation project. The broad-gauge passenger services south of Goodwood were thus restricted to one track, with crossing loops located at Mitcham, Sleeps Hill, Eden Hills and Blackwood. At the same time, the stations at Millswood, Hawthorn and Clapham were closed to speed up services. Millswood was reopened in 2014.

=== Re-sleepering and electrification ===
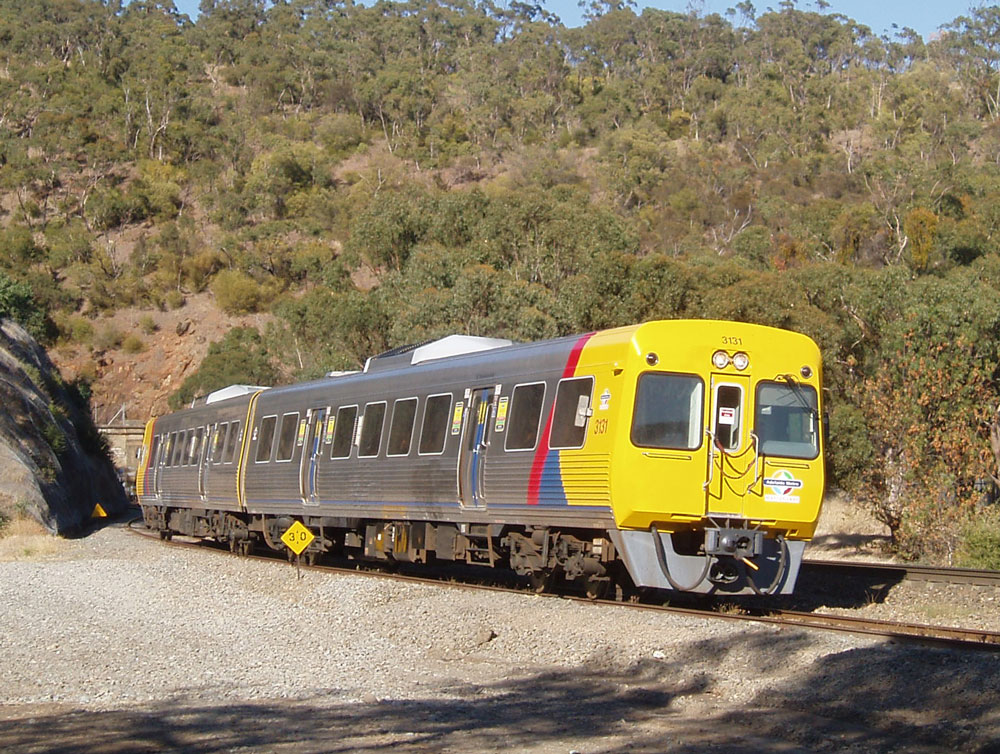
A 3000 class railcar leaving Sleeps Hill Tunnel

In 2008, the Government of South Australia announced a plan to rebuild the Belair line. The line closed on 26 April 2009, when buses replaced trains. Both track bed and track were renewed. Dual-gauge sleepers were laid to allow for the line to be converted to standard gauge in future – this is not planned in the immediate future due to extra engineering work and complications with the standard gauge line. The line reopened on 23 August 2009.

As of 2025, the standard-gauge track is owned by the Australian Rail Track Corporation and continues beyond Belair as the Adelaide-Wolseley railway line. The track is used by freight trains operated by Aurizon, Pacific National and SCT Logistics, and by the twice-weekly Overland passenger service to Melbourne operated by Journey Beyond.

The Adelaide end of the Belair line was closed from 1 January 2013 to 14 July 2013 to allow electrification of the line from Adelaide to Goodwood (built concurrently with electrification of the adjacent Seaford line) and construction of a grade separation at Goodwood Junction. Relatively little work was performed on the Belair line itself. In 2021 the new operator of the line, Keolis Downer, enforced a limit on the number of bicycles carried in railcars, which affected patronage of the Mitcham Hills mountain bike circuit.

== Route ==
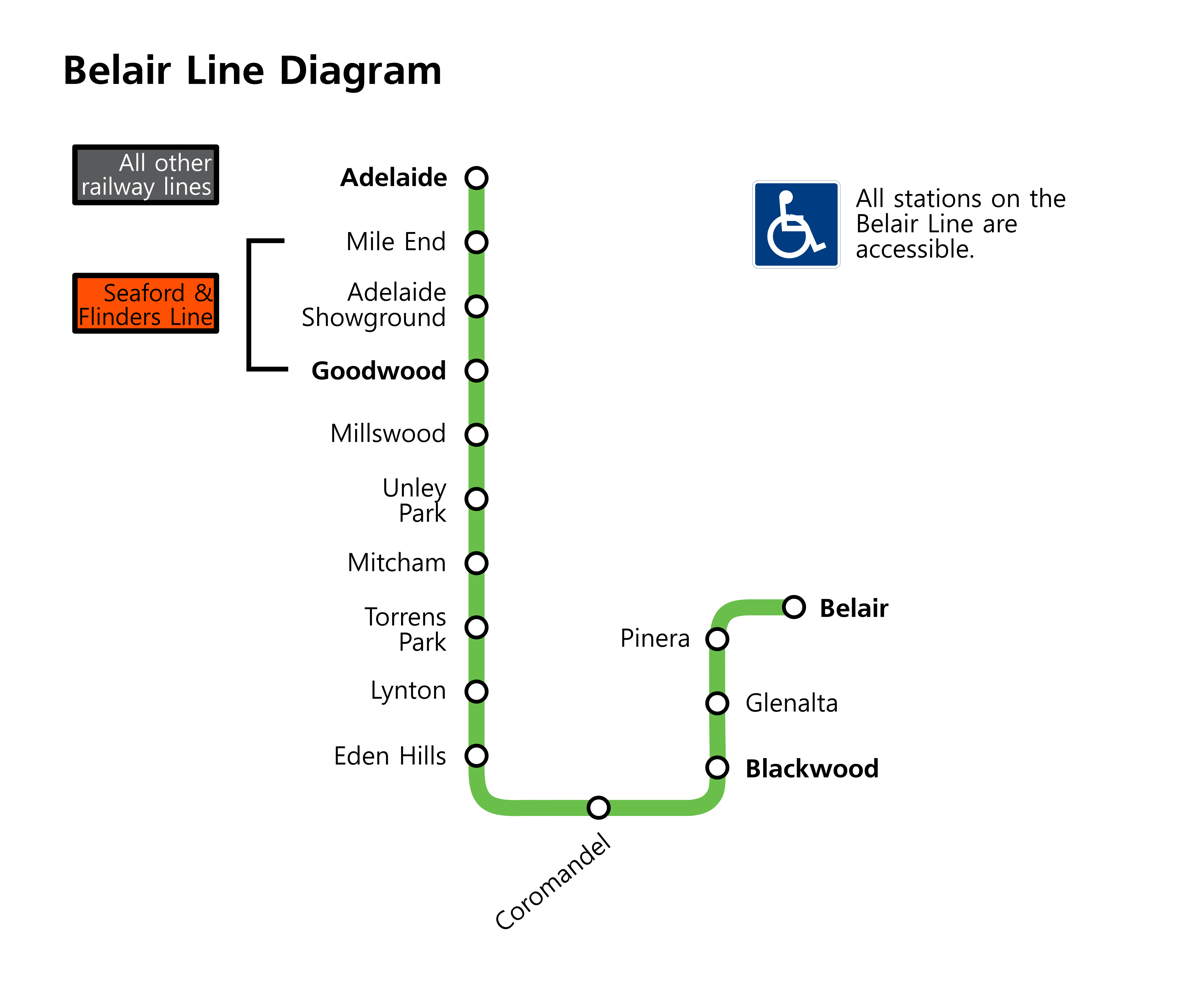
Route diagram of the Belair Line

All services are now operated by Adelaide Metro's 3000 class railcars. Until June 2007, some services on weekends were operated by a 2000 class railcar modified to incorporate increased bike capacity. In 2005, trains ran the route every 30 minutes on weekdays (hourly after 7pm) and every 60 minutes on weekends and public holidays. From 2006, because of the line becoming single, this was downgraded to every 36/24 minutes on weekdays. In 2018 trains depart at least twice every hour on weekdays, with as little as 10 minutes' waiting time during rush hour.

=== Line guide ===
Belair Line
Name	Distance from Adelaide	Year opened	Serving suburbs	Connections
Adelaide	0.0 km	1856	Adelaide	Gawler Grange; Outer Harbor Port Dock Bus Tram
Mile End	2.0 km	1898	Mile End	
Adelaide Showground	4.0 km	2014	Keswick, Wayville	
Goodwood	5.0 km	1883	Forestville, Goodwood	Flinders Seaford
Millswood	5.9 km	c. 1910	Millswood	
Unley Park	7.0 km	c. 1910	Hawthorn, Unley Park, Westborne Park	Bus
Mitcham	8.5 km	1883	Lower Mitcham	Bus
Torrens Park	9.3 km	1914	Lower Mitcham, Torrens Park	Bus
Lynton	10.7 km	1946	Clapham, Lynton	
Eden Hills	14.2 km	1912	Eden Hills	
Coromandel	17.2 km	1883	Blackwood	
Blackwood	18.1 km	1883	Blackwood	Bus Interchange
Glenalta	19.3 km	1921	Blackwood, Glenalta	
Pinera	20.2 km	c. 1920	Belair	Bus
Belair	21.5 km	1883	Belair	Bus

=== Former stations ===
- Clapham – opened 1910s, relocated 1917, closed 1995.
- Hawthorn – opened 1910s, closed 1995.
- Keswick – opened 1913, closed 2013.
- Mile End Goods – closed 1994.
- Showground Central – opened 2005 for seasonal use, closed 2013.
- Sleeps Hill – opened 1909, closed 1946.

== Gallery ==
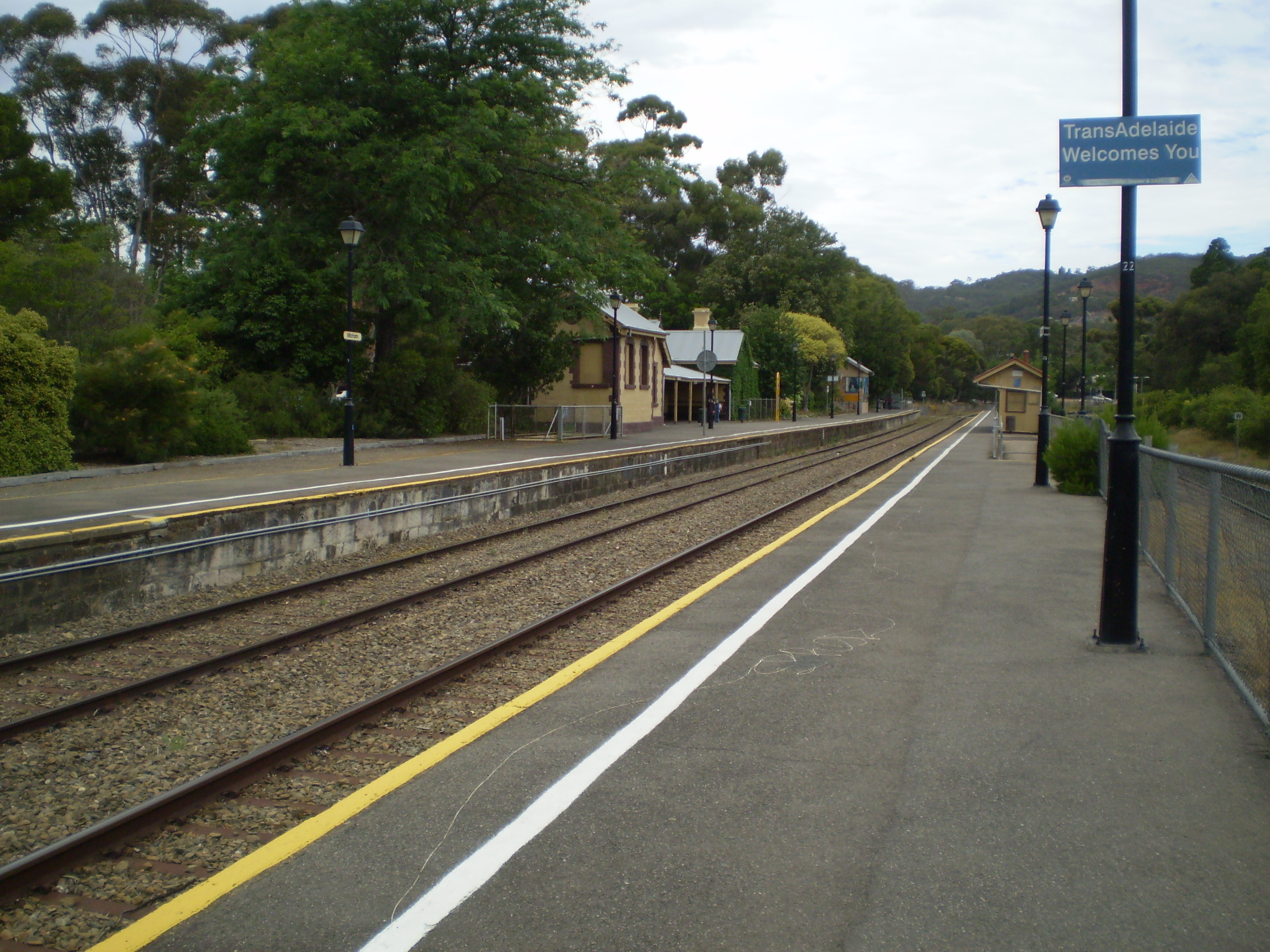
Mitcham station

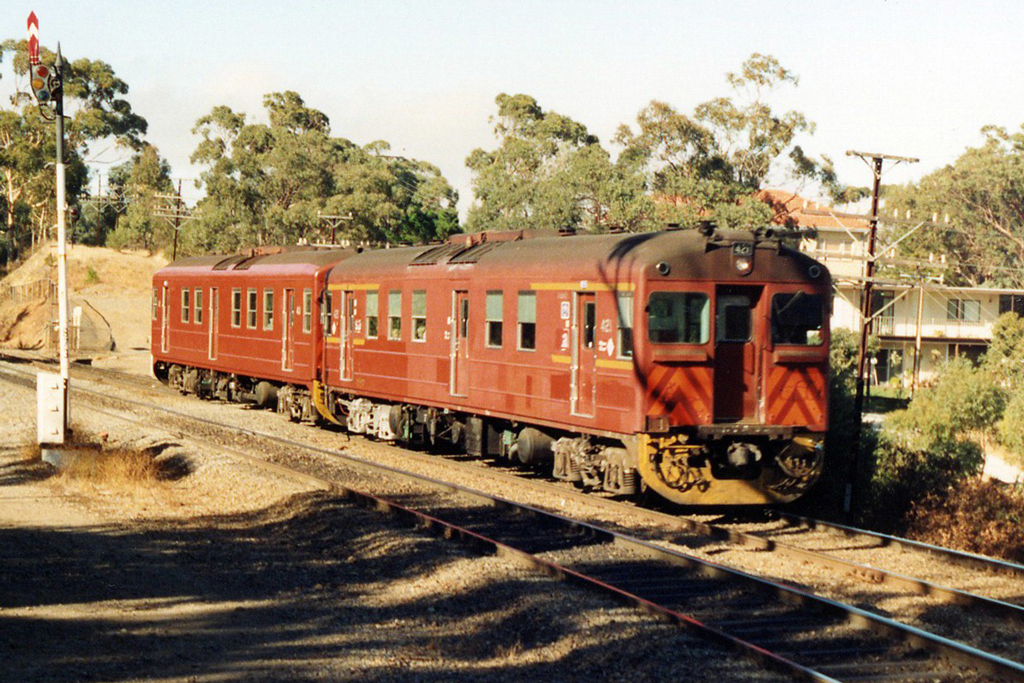
Two Red Hen railcars working a Belair–Adelaide local train during the late 1980s, approaching Lynton

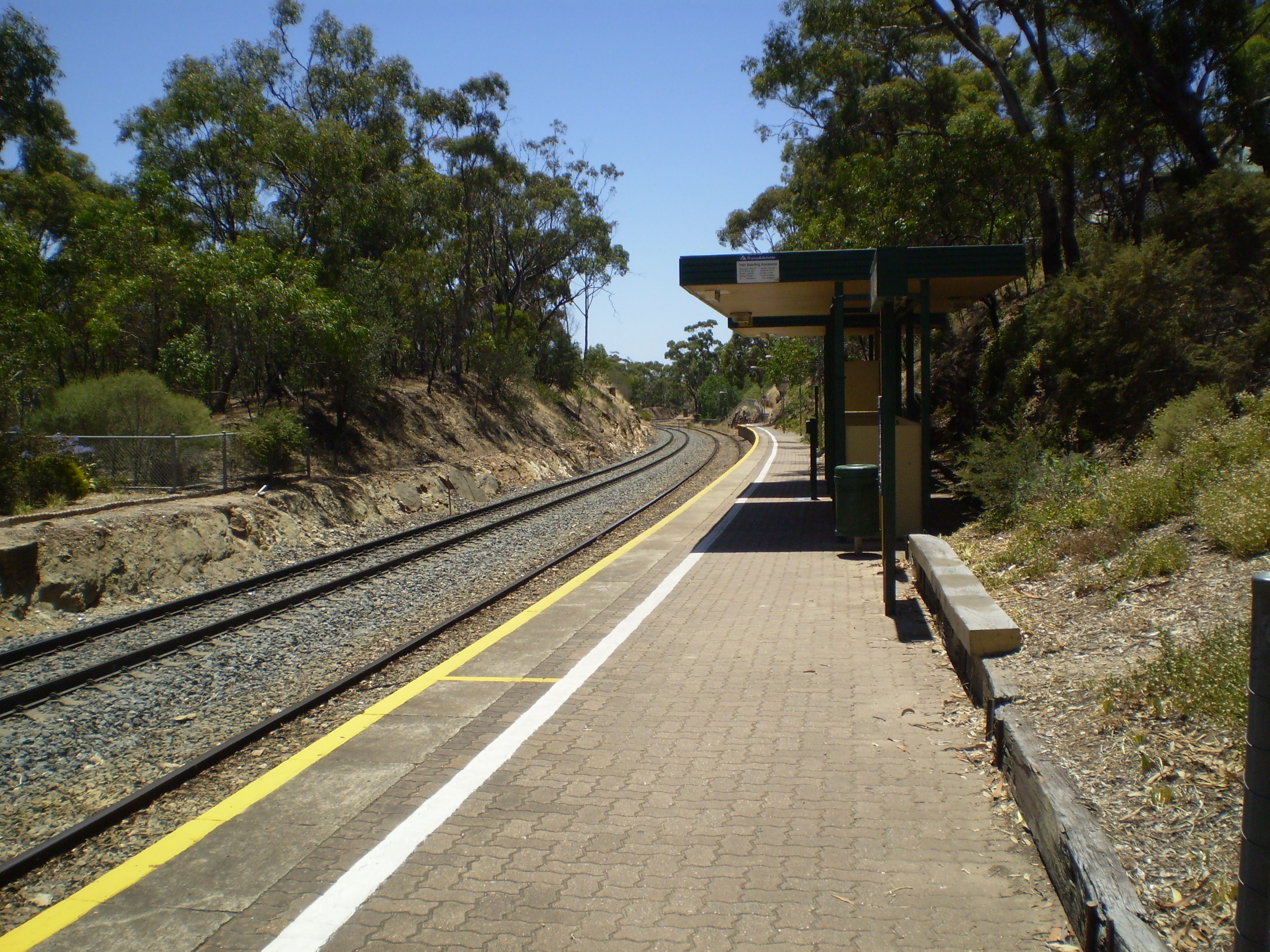
Eden Hills station

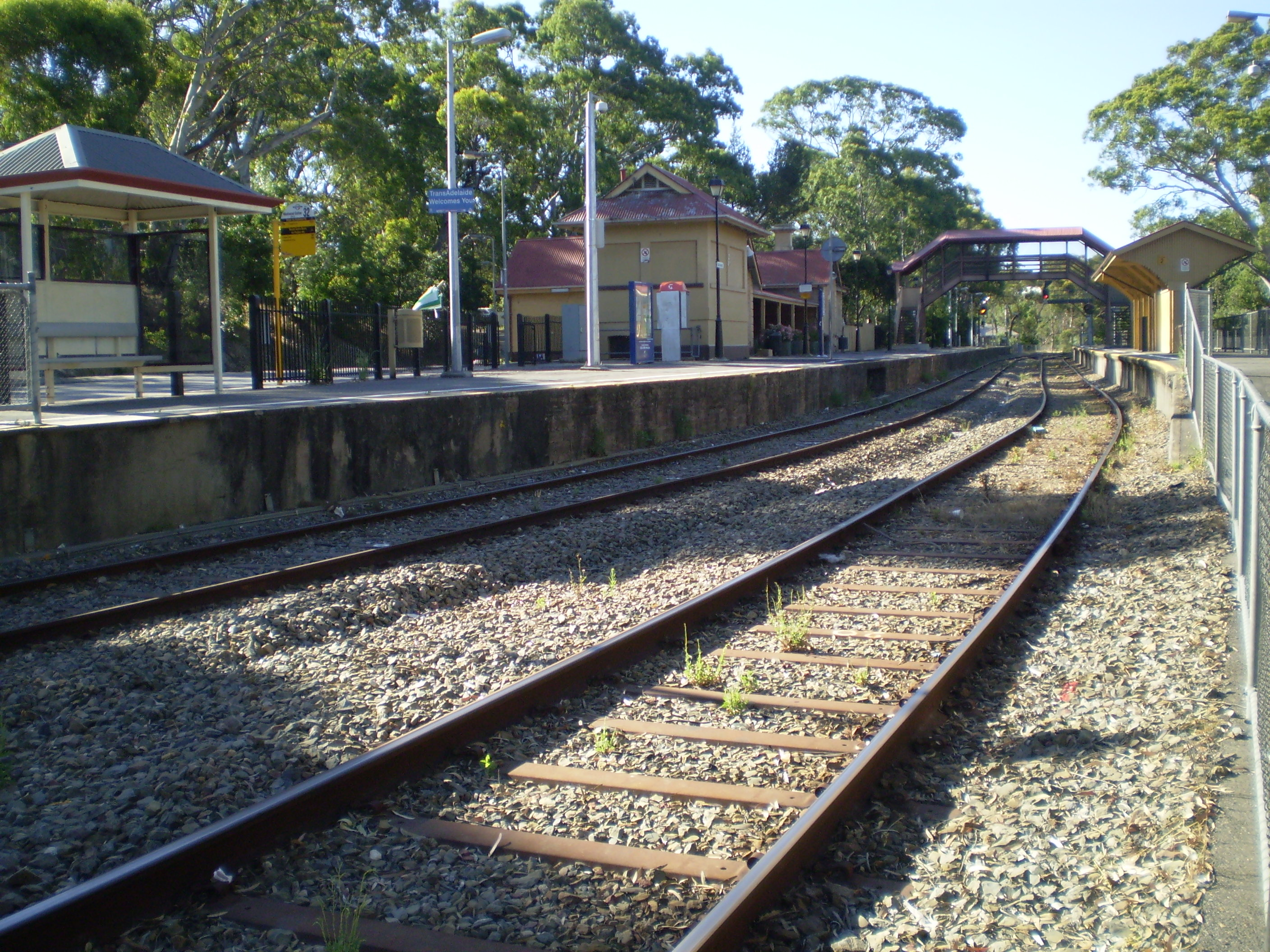
Blackwood station in 2007; bus interchange is on the left

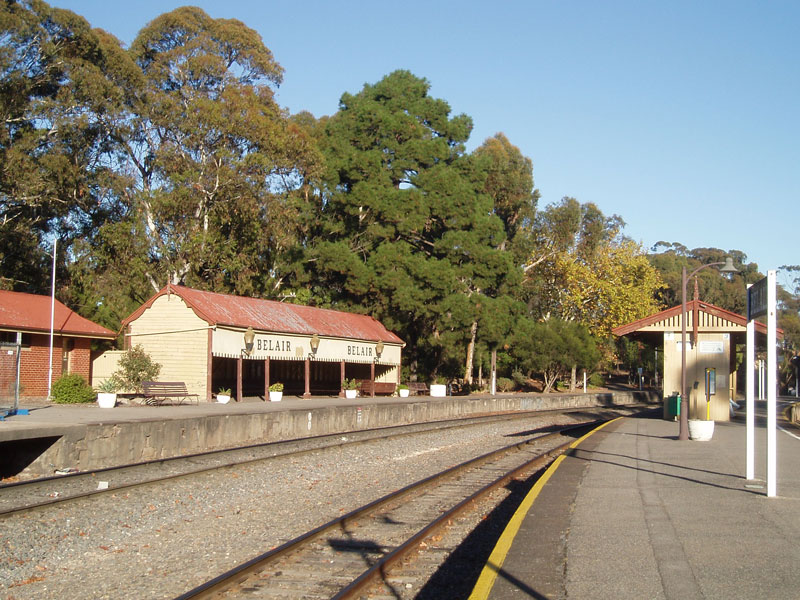
Belair station, where services to Bridgewater once departed

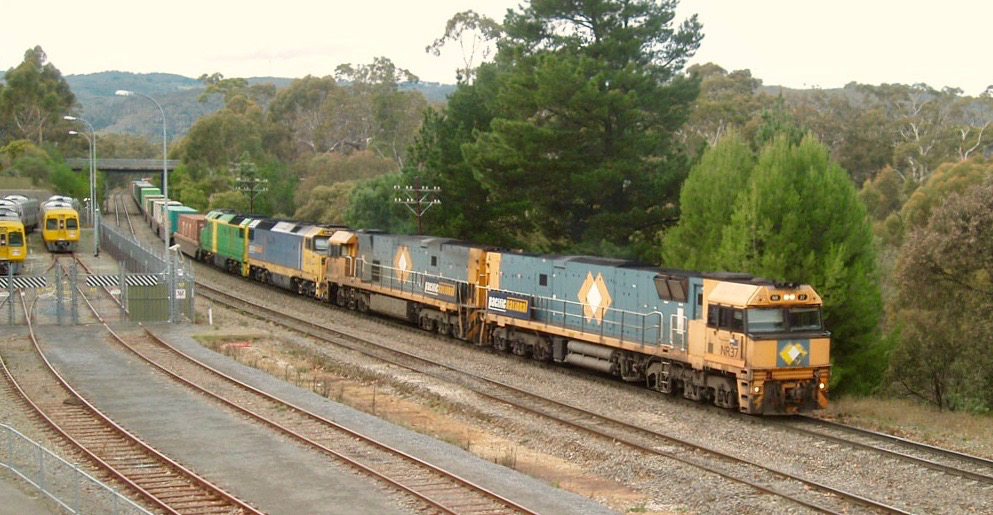
Pacific National freight train passing through Belair
