= Government House, Adelaide =

Residence of the Governor of South Australia

Government House
- The building in 2026

General information
- Type: Official residence
- Architectural style: Georgian/Regency with Italianate
- Location: North Terrace, Adelaide, South Australia, Australia
- Coordinates: 34.9203°S 138.6003°E
- Current tenants: Governor of South Australia
- Construction started: 1839
- Completed: 1840 (original building)

Design and construction
- Architect: Edward O'Brien
- Other designers: George Kingston; Edward Hamilton
- Main contractor: East & Breeze

Website
- www.governor.sa.gov.au

South Australian Heritage Register
- Official name: Government House
- Designated: 24 July 1980
- Reference no.: 10873

Government House, located in Adelaide on the corner of North Terrace and King William Road, is the official residence of the governor of South Australia.

== History ==
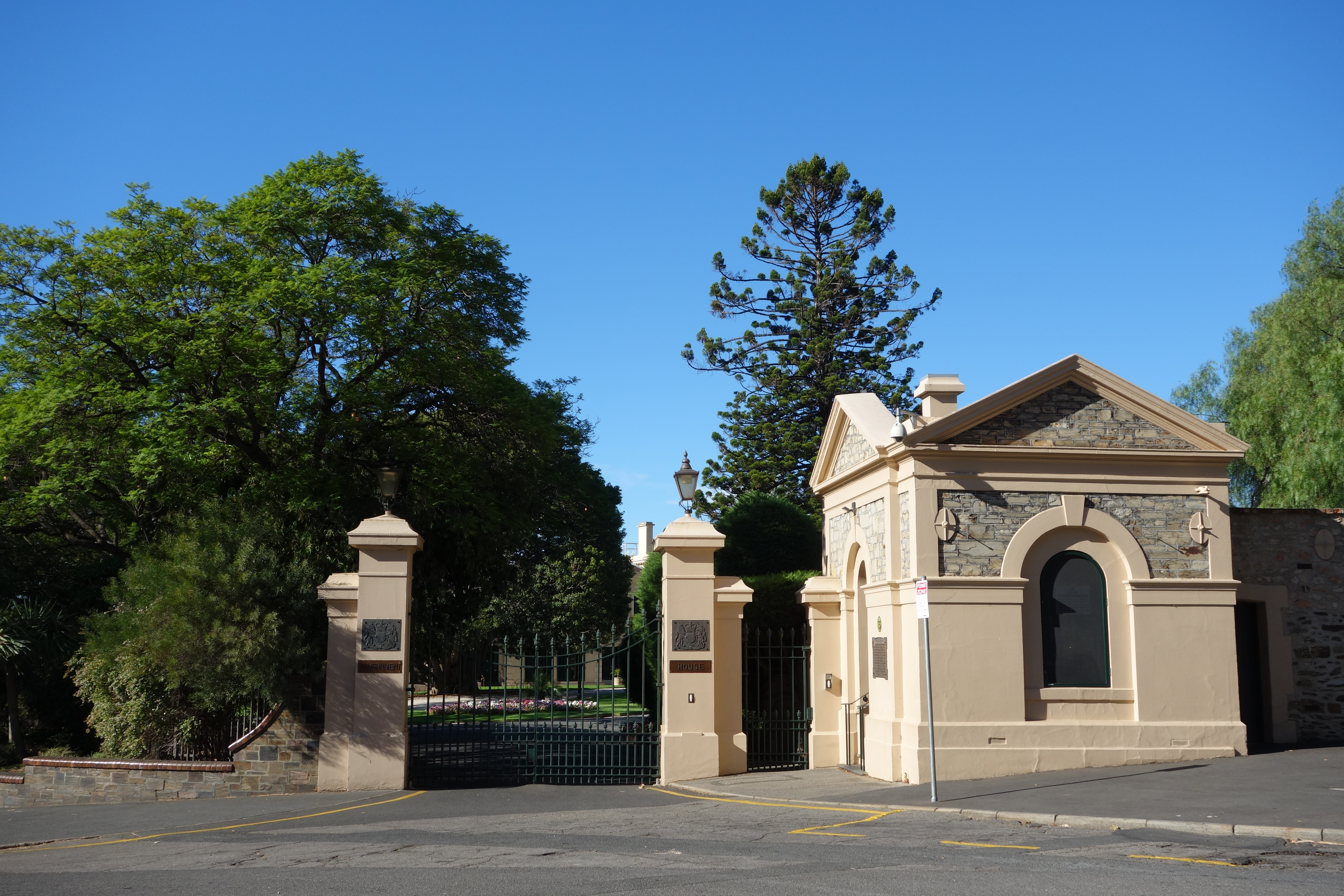
Gates to the main entrance to Government House on North Terrace, Adelaide

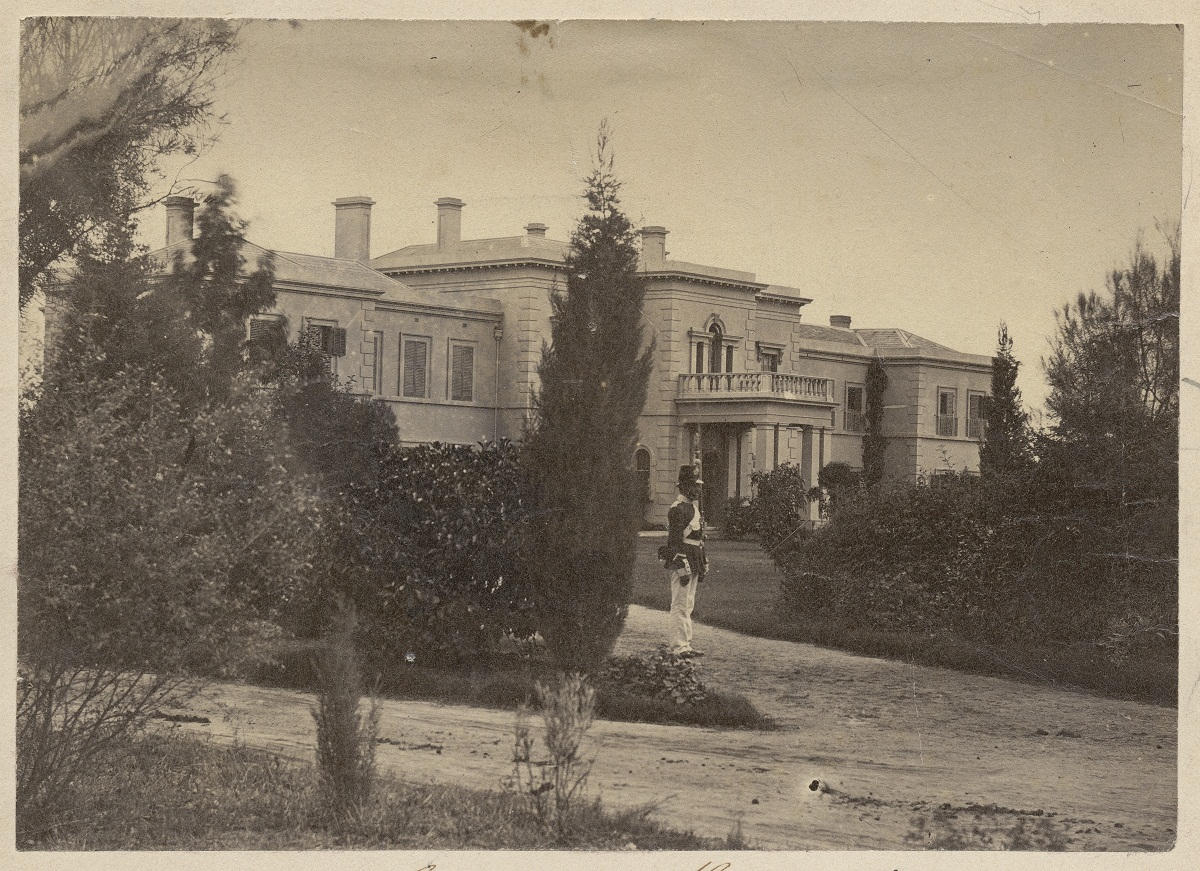
Government House with an Imperial soldier on duty (latter were withdrawn in 1870)

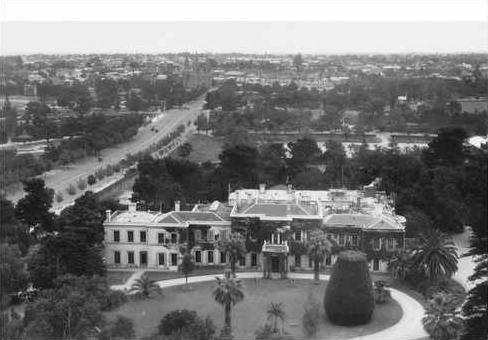
View of Government House and North Adelaide circa 1933

The original "Government Hut" was a thatched hut constructed by the seamen of HMS Buffalo. Governor John Hindmarsh wrote in May 1837 "I have but one end of my mud hut finished and all my family lay on the floor of one room while two smaller ones serve for Mrs. H., myself and a female servant", When Lieutenant Colonel George Gawler replaced Hindmarsh in 1838, he abandoned plans for a permanent house of timber and gave directions for the erection of a new building of masonry to cost £4,000 - if possible, but not to exceed £5,000.

A plan had been obtained from an English architect, Edward O'Brien, but this was amended by George Strickland Kingston, who had come to South Australia as an assistant to the Surveyor General, William Light, and who had had some experience in architecture and building. When Kingston received tenders for the proposed work they were in the vicinity of £7,000. After further amendment of the plans to reduce the cost, a contract was let to the builders, Messrs East and Breeze. After Governor Gawler was recalled to England in 1841, partly because of his "extravagant" building programs, his successors George Grey and Lieutenant Colonel Frederick Holt Robe found it necessary to spend the least possible amount on the house.

The earliest part of the house to be built was the east wing of the present building. It was completed and occupied in May 1840. Government House is thus probably the second oldest continuously occupied house in the State, after Walkley cottage in St Mark's College, Pennington Terrace, North Adelaide, which was first occupied in mid-1839. When completed, Government House consisted of the present main drawing room, morning room, small dining room, and upstairs there were three bedrooms, a dressing room and two small servants' rooms. Governors, their families and house guests make use of all the upstairs rooms.

It was listed on the South Australian Heritage Register on 24 July 1980 and on the defunct Register of the National Estate on 21 March 1978.

The eastern Kintore Avenue boundary of the grounds of Government House was stepped back by 10 metres during 2015–2016, to make way for the construction of the Anzac Centenary Memorial Walk connecting the National War Memorial on North Terrace to the Torrens Parade Ground. The walkway was completed in 2016.

=== Summer residences ===
Governors formerly used a summer residence in the Adelaide Hills to escape the heat of the Adelaide Plains. Two buildings were used for this purpose. The first of these, Old Government House, was built in what is now the Belair National Park in 1860. In 1880, this building was superseded by a larger residence at Marble Hill near Norton Summit, until it was destroyed in the Black Sunday bushfires of 1955. Subsequently, the Governor was not provided with a summer residence.

== Functions ==
Government House is located in well-kept grounds which are periodically used for important public ceremonies, such as:

- Presentation of Queen's Scout and Queen's Guide awards
- Presentation of Year 12 Merit certificates
- Presentation of Debating SA Awards
- Other non-profit functions

Open Days are held twice a year, and in recent years a series of "public conversations" have been held in winter months. The grounds are open for "Lunch on the Lawns" on the first Friday of the month.

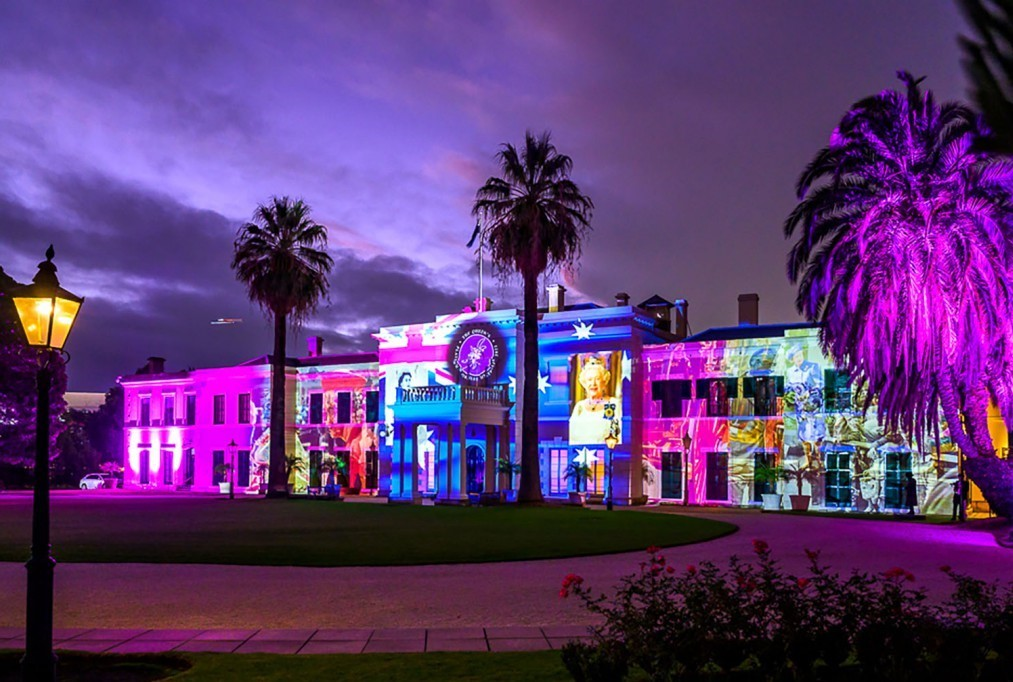
Government House illuminated for the Queen's Platinum Jubilee in 2022

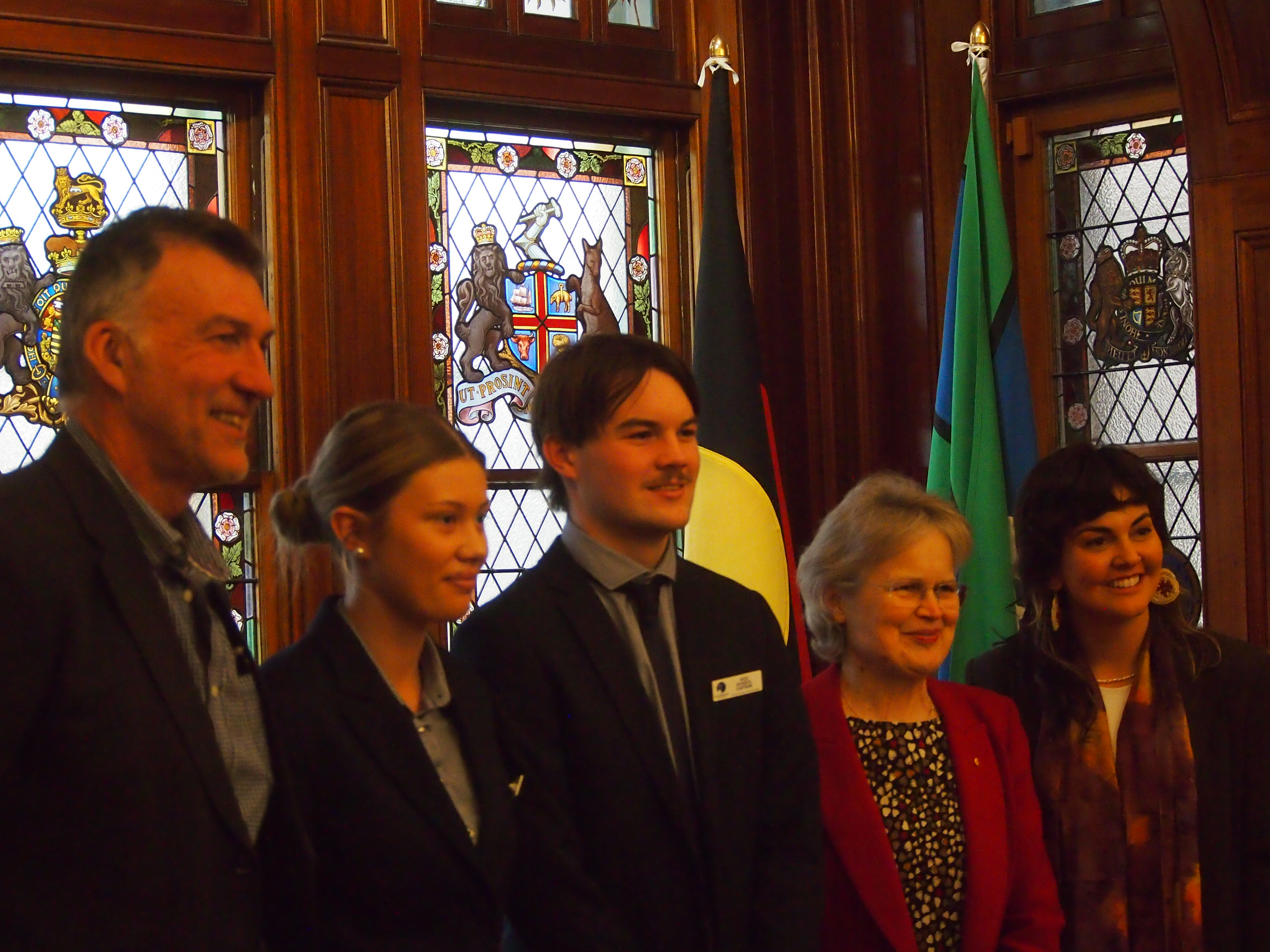
Frances Adamson (2nd from r) with Tim Jarvis (l) and Tiahni Adamson (r), and students after a seminar in 2024 on "Environmental Leadership"

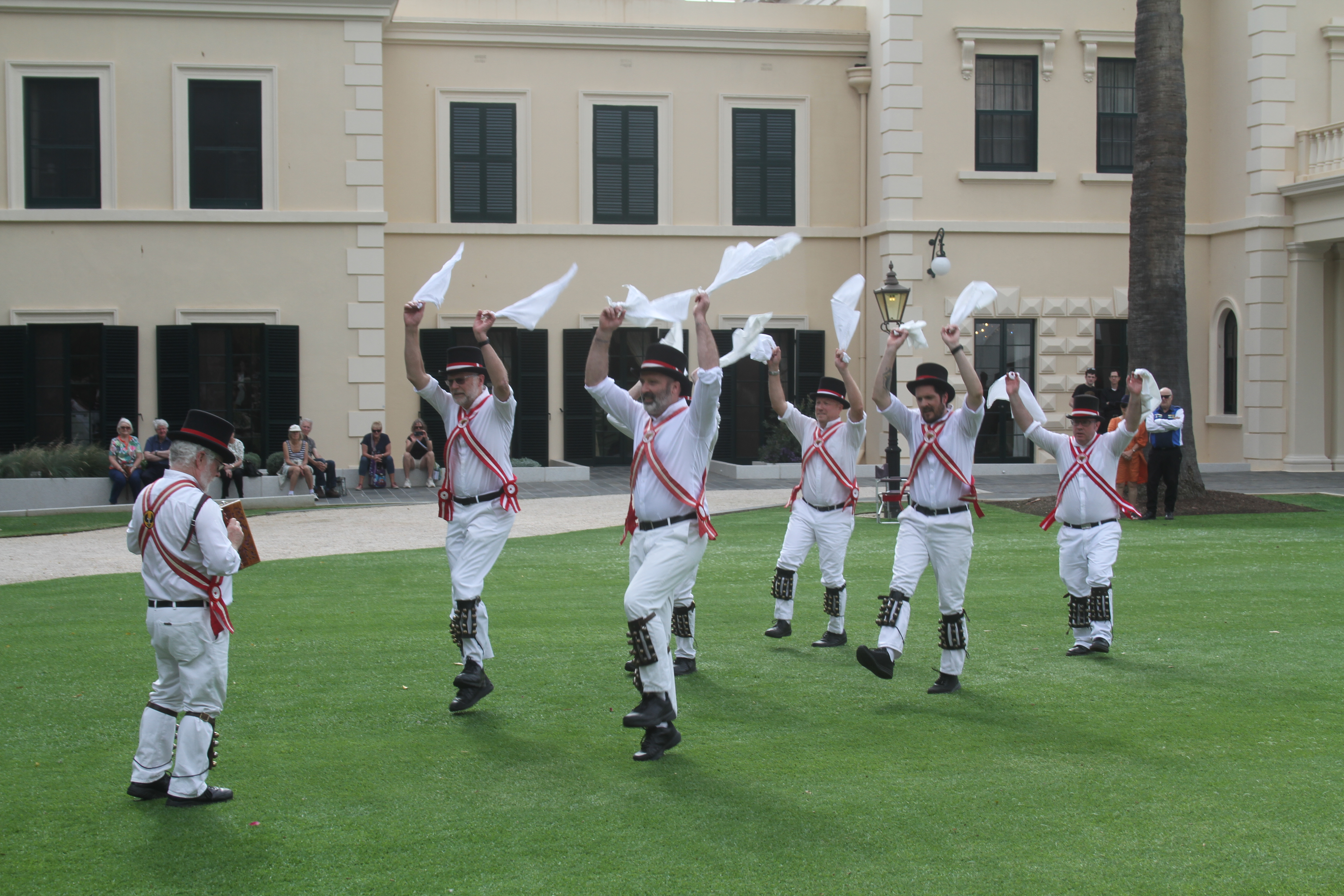
Members of The Adelaide Morris performing at Government House,
May Day 2026

== Arts ==
In 2019 a Government House Arts Residency program was instituted, with the inaugural recipient being Margaret Worth.

== Flags ==
Until May 2022, there were three flag poles on the roof of Government House. From 27 May 2022, governor Frances Adamson had four new flag poles installed on the lawn, so that the Aboriginal flag and Torres Strait Islander flag could both be permanently flown for the first time at Government House, along with the Australian flag and South Australian flag. All of the newly-installed flags are visible from King William Street and North Terrace. The flag-raising ceremony took place at the start of National Reconciliation Week.

== Environs ==
Cottages were built in the northern part of the grounds, originally for the butler (1928) and the chauffeur (1945). The grounds of Government House itself are surrounded by prominent public buildings, statues and memorials:

- North Terrace, Adelaide
- Jubilee 150 Walkway
- Torrens Parade Ground
- South African War Memorial (South Australia)
- National War Memorial (South Australia)
- State Library of South Australia
- Parliament of South Australia
- Migration Museum, Adelaide

== See also ==
- Government Houses of Australia
- Government Houses in the Commonwealth
- Governors of South Australia
