= Marble Hill, South Australia =

Marble Hill
- Town
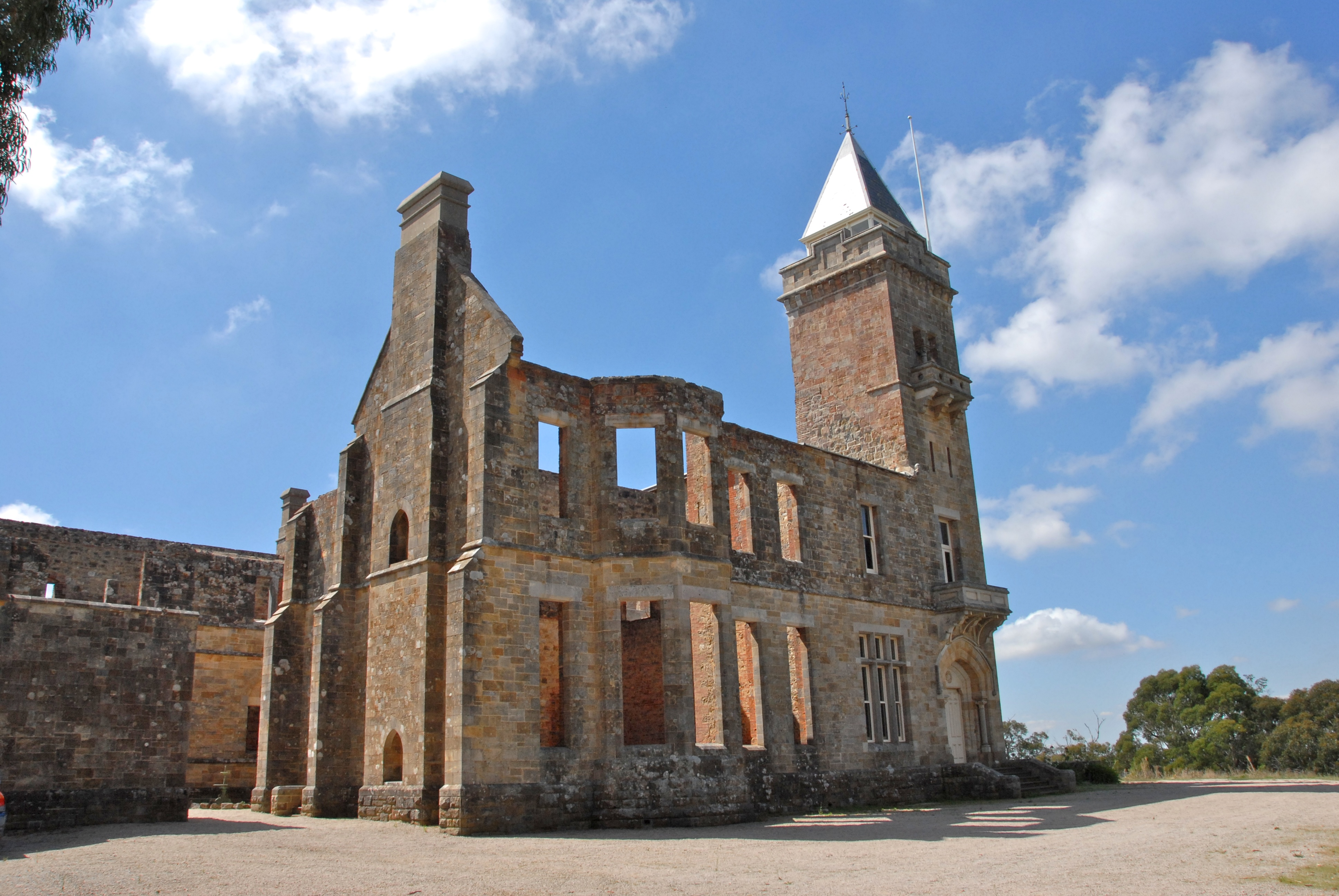
- Ruins of the Governor's summer residence, showing the restored tower.

- Interactive map of Marble Hill
- Coordinates: 34°55′9.80″S 138°45′30.29″E
- Country: Australia
- State: South Australia
- LGA: Adelaide Hills Council
- Location: 14 km (8.7 mi) from Adelaide
- Established: 1879

Government
  - State electorate: Morialta
  - Federal division: Mayo
- Elevation: 615 m (2,018 ft)

Population
  - Total: 69 (SAL 2021)
- Postcode: 5137
Localities around Marble Hill
	Cherryville
Norton Summit	Marble Hill	Basket Range
	Ashton

Marble Hill was the viceregal summer residence for the Governor of South Australia for seventy-five years, from 1880 to 1955. It is also the name of a ward of the Adelaide Hills Council, and a suburb, both named after the residence and in which the residence is located. It is about 20 kilometres (12 mi) east of Adelaide between the towns of Ashton and Cherryville, and has expansive views of the Adelaide Hills to the North and East, and the Adelaide Plains to the West.

The residence was destroyed during the Black Sunday bushfire of 1955. Subsequently, the site was managed by the National Trust of South Australia from 1967 to 1992, and the Department for Environment and Heritage from 1992 to 2009. A volunteer Friends of Parks group, Friends of Marble Hill, ran open days and maintained the site from 1994 to 2008. To date, the main building has never been fully restored, but the National Trust undertook restoration of the tower and the nearby stables in the 1970s. Successive State Governments have not been prepared to restore the building (despite it having been a residence of the vice-regal representative), as the expense involved would not be considered responsible use of public funds. In 2009, Marble Hill was sold to a local family, who plan to reconstruct and re-use the building.

== History ==
The locality of Marble Hill was not greatly developed until after the establishment of the Vice-Regal Summer Residence. It consisted largely of uncleared pastoral land until 1880. This was partly due to the rugged terrain dissuading settlers, but also due to the fact that the Government did not offer a large amount of the land for sale. A large area was declared a Government Reserve in 1878, the year that construction on the residence commenced. It was around that time that Governor William Jervois was said to have given the hill its name. When informed that marble had been found during the excavation of the site, he remarked "Then we shall call it Marble Hill". In fact, there is no true marble at Marble Hill. The Governor's informant had merely misidentified the locally abundant quartzite. An alternative account contends that it was instead named for the hill's rounded top, which supposedly resembled a marble when viewed from a distance. In 1896, part of the Government Reserve was subdivided into 34 blocks of approximately 20 acres (8.1 ha) each which were offered for lease. The "blockers", as those who took up residence on the blocks became known, found it difficult to make a living on the uncleared land in the early years, but by the 1920s, all of the blocks were tenanted and productive, planted mainly with fruit trees.

Prior to the establishment of the Government Reserve, part of the locality was used as a shelter for stray animals.

== Demographics ==
Although a gazetted locality, Marble Hill is too small to have its own postcode. In the 2006 census, Marble Hill was included within the postal area of the neighbouring town of Ashton (5137). At that time, there were 427 persons resident in the area (52.6% male and 47.4% female), living in 165 occupied dwellings. 100% of the dwellings were separate houses. The median age was 40 years. Unemployment was 3%, and median weekly household income was $1366. 38.2% of dwellings were owned outright, with 12.7% rented at a median weekly rent of $200.

For the 2011 census, a suburban boundary realignment saw Marble Hill moved to the postal area of Basket Range (5138). In that year, there were 374 residents in the area (53.7% male and 46.3% female), living in 134 occupied dwellings, 100% of which were separate houses. The median age was 44. Unemployment was 5.5%, and median weekly household income was $1704. 47.8% of dwellings were owned outright, with 16.4% rented at a median weekly rent of $250.

The 2016 census used gazetted suburb and locality boundaries. Marble Hill on its own had a population of 67 people in 24 dwellings.

== Vice-Regal summer residence ==
Vice-Regal residence from the south showing some of the gardens, circa 1900.

The first Vice-Regal country residence was built at Government Farm, Belair in 1860. Although well-appointed for its time, it was a relatively modest structure, and several governors found it too small for their purposes. When Governor William Jervois arrived in 1877, he very soon proposed the construction of a new and grander building. He was instrumental in securing government expenditure, and also personally oversaw the selection of a site and directed the design process. The first stone was laid on 18 July 1878, and the structure was completed and furnished in late 1879. A budget overrun led the Hon. G. C. Hawker (the Commissioner of Public Works) to invite South Australian Parliamentarians to see the completed structure in December 1879. Seeing the magnificence of the building, they were convinced that the money had been well spent.

The designing architect was William McMinn, and was supervised by government Architect-in-Chief E. J. Woods with James Shaw supervisor of works. McMinn's design was of the Victorian Gothic Revival style, adapted for Australian conditions by the addition of large verandahs on three sides which shielded the structure from the fierce northern sun. His original design was for 40 rooms, although only 26 were ever completed, with the western aspect of the building left for possible later addition. The main eastern rooms included a drawing room, a morning room, a dining room and a spacious staircase of kauri pine and blackwood. There was no large ballroom, and the dining hall was not grand – it was a residence intended to be primarily a retreat from the summer heat of the Adelaide plains, rather than a primary place of residence with all the accompanying facilities for entertainment. The sandstone used for construction was sourced from local quarries.

Stables and caretaker's cottage were built a short distance to the west.

=== Governors in residence ===
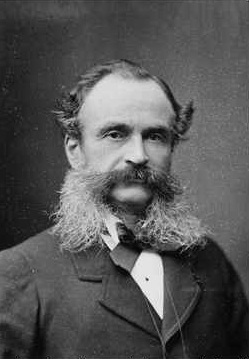
Governor William Jervois was responsible for the decision to build Marble Hill

All fifteen governors who held office from 1880 to 1955 spent at least some time at Marble Hill. In addition, a number of distinguished guests were welcomed throughout the house's 75-year history as a viceregal residence, particularly King George V and Queen Mary (as Duke and Duchess of Cornwall and York) who stayed in 1901. Many governors also welcomed local children and other such groups on tours from time to time.

- 1880–1883: William Jervois – From his earliest days of residence, Jervois was very friendly with the locals, and keenly assisted with fundraising for church and district projects.
- 1883–1889: William Robinson – Sir William found the isolation of Marble Hill lonely, and had no sooner arrived there than he was wanting to be elsewhere, such as Glenelg or some other seaside resort.
- 1889–1895: Algernon Keith-Falconer – Lord and Lady Kintore made regular visits during their tenure, and had the gardens laid out.
- 1895–1899: Thomas Buxton – Buxton notably held a garden party at the residence for over 100 delegates of the Federal Convention, during their meeting in Adelaide during April 1897.
- 1899–1902: Hallam Tennyson – Sir Hallam and Lady Audrey Tennyson were particularly fond of Marble Hill, despite having to contend with heat, drought and bushfires during their stays. They returned in December 1902 when Lord Tennyson was Governor General, and entertained the idea of buying it if it ever became available.
- 1903–1909: George Le Hunte – The annual visit of the LeHuntes was keenly anticipated by the local children, as the Governor regularly held entertainments for them at the residence.
- 1909–1914: Day Bosanquet – Lady Bosanquet continued the tradition of inviting local schoolchildren to Marble Hill, hosting a "Picnic at Marble Hill" for students of Norton Summit and Cherryville Primary Schools on a yearly basis.
- 1914–1920: Henry Galway – Galway resided at Marble Hill for four of his six summers as Governor. In early 1916, he offered Marble Hill for use as a military hospital, in response to a request from the military authorities for a building "a considerable distance from the nearest hotel". However, the authorities decided that the building was too isolated.
- 1920–1922: Archibald Weigall – Governor Weigall was a keen cricketer, and during his residence held an annual match between the Viceregal party and locals at the nearby Ashton Oval.
- 1922–1927: Tom Bridges – Governor Bridges occupied Marble Hill only for the occasional weekend, prompting the government to consider selling the residence, as it was costing £328 per annum to run it. Some of the suggested uses for the building included a boarding house, hostel, flats or consumptive sanitorium.
- 1928–1934: Alexander Hore-Ruthven – Marble Hill continued to fall from favour under Governor Hore-Ruthven, who indicated in 1932 that he would be willing to forgo the use of Marble Hill under his contract (a possibility the Government had been investigating since 1928). However, the remoteness of Marble Hill had made it difficult to retain staff or to easily convert to a government institution, and so the status quo prevailed.
- 1934–1939: Winston Dugan – A number of modifications were made to the residence and outbuildings during 1939, among them the addition of several bathrooms and the conversion of the coach-house into a garage for motorcars.
- 1939–1944: Malcolm Barclay-Harvey – During the years of the Second World War, Sir Malcolm and Lady Muriel Barclay-Harvey spent time at Marble Hill whenever they were able to take a break from supporting the war effort. They restored the beautiful gardens, and Sir Malcolm (an avid railway enthusiast) had an outdoor model railway installed. Lady Muriel also named one of her racehorses "Marble Hill" after the residence.
- 1944–1952: Willoughby Norrie – Governor Norrie and his family took up residence at Marble Hill as soon as they arrived in Adelaide toward the end of 1944, and lived there every subsequent summer of his governorship. Lady Norrie hosted Lady Baden-Powell in her capacity as World Chief Guide at Marble Hill during her 1948 trip to Australia,
- 1952–1955: Robert George – In 1954 the Government commenced renovation of both viceregal residences. The original acetylene gas lighting at Marble Hill was replaced, at considerable expense, with electricity. Sir Robert and Lady George's possessions were moved to Marble Hill while Government House was being renovated. Marble Hill was to have been renovated the following year.

=== Bushfires ===
Marble Hill's location at the peak of a steep, densely wooded ridge meant that bushfires were a regular threat.

- 1882 – On 8 February, only two years after being completed, Marble Hill was first threatened by a bushfire. The fire broke out in a gully to the east of the residence during the afternoon, possibly due to careless cooking by locals. Swift action by the police and residents contained the fire, but it continued to burn along the gully until the evening of the 9th. The garden and some of the fences were damaged.
- 1901 – The intense heat and drought of the summer of 1901 resulted in a number of bushfires while Sir Hallam and Lady Tennyson were in residence. Lady Tennyson wrote that the bushfires, with their billowing smoke and glowing hilltops by night, were a remarkable sight. The gardens and part of the orchard were damaged in the fire.
- 1910 – On Sunday 20 February, bushfires that had been menacing the Mt Lofty Ranges around Norton Summit began to threaten Marble Hill. The Governor in residence, Admiral Bosanquet, directed firefighters and local volunteers in the burning of firebreaks, but it was a tense night for those guarding the residence. On Monday, a change in the wind brought the fires rapidly upon them. The Register reported that "big trees were as matches before the advancing fire." The full force of the firefighters was mustered, which enabled the residence to escape damage, although the Government Domain was largely burnt.
- 1912 – Admiral Bosanquet had to defend the residence a second time. Early on 14 January, a fire broke out at Morialta on the property of the late Sir Richard Baker. It soon became apparent that the westerly wind would drive the fire toward Marble Hill. When the fire was at its height, the English cricket team and Lord Richard Nevill arrived, having been invited for lunch. They had to dash through the flames to reach the residence, and were able to render most timely assistance. The servant's quarters, the caretaker's cottage, the stables and even the kitchen of Marble Hill itself were all ignited, but fortunately these conflagrations were all noticed and quickly extinguished. The gardens, however, were destroyed.
- 1930 – Around 100 acres (0.40 km^{2}) of stringybark forest adjoining the house were destroyed on 18 February. The Governor and staff managed to subdue the fire when it was halfway up the drive.
- 1939 – Marble Hill was again threatened by the Black Friday fires of 1939.
- 1955 – The Black Sunday bushfires destroyed Marble Hill on 2 January.
- 2000 – On 16 December, a prescribed burn conducted by CFS below Marble Hill jumped containment lines and turned into a major firefighting operation.

=== Destruction ===
On 2 January 1955, fifteen people were in residence at Marble Hill, including Sir Robert and Lady George, their family, and staff. The bushfire conditions were extreme, with a temperature of 36 °C (97 °F) as early as 7am. By 1pm, the temperature had risen to 42 °C (108 °F), and winds of up to 70 kilometres per hour (43 mph) were driving a bushfire that had broken out at nearby Anstey's Hill towards Marble Hill.

With little warning, the strong winds drove the fire up the slope to the northwest of the house, and flames contacted the building. The bitumen used on the balcony floor and the seaweed used for insulation in the roof were easily ignited, and the house was soon on fire. The governor with his sons and staff struggled to save the building, but the buckets and hoses which had been prepared were totally inadequate. The building was engulfed by flame with astonishing speed. By this time the bushfire had completely surrounded the residence, the cars which had been prepared as a last-resort were burning, and molten lead was showering down from the roof. Escape was impossible.

At the prompting of Sir Robert, the fifteen people at Marble Hill dashed out of the house for the relative safety of a retaining wall by the driveway, sheltering under wet blankets. The fire swept over them and totally destroyed the house. After around two hours, rescuers were able to reach them and the party were transported to Adelaide, where they were treated for some minor injuries. Later, it was discovered that a servant's cat had also survived by sheltering in the cellar.

All of the governor's possessions were lost in the fire, as they had been transferred to Marble Hill while Government House was undergoing restoration following damage suffered in the earthquake of 1954. Marble Hill had been slated for renovation after Government House, but the house's destruction led to the Government of South Australia re-evaluating its plans for the building.

=== Ruin ===
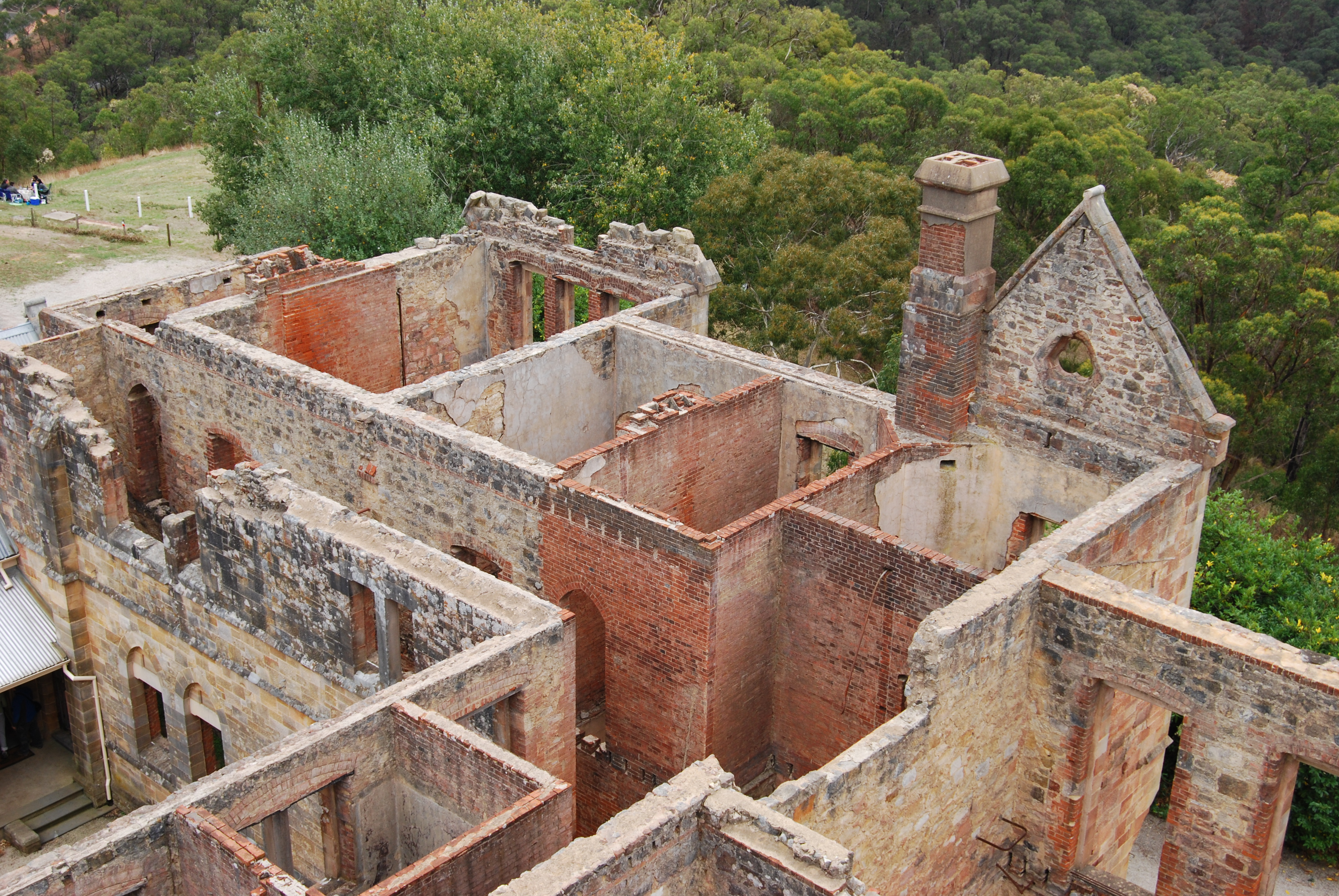
Ruins of Marble Hill in 2008 from the former bushfire lookout tower.

Because of the prohibitive cost of reconstruction, in September 1955 the government announced it would not rebuild Marble Hill. Additional damage was done when the government demolished some areas of the building considered to be "unsafe" a few days after the fire.

In 1967, the property was dedicated to the National Trust of South Australia as a public reserve, although visitors were still barred from the structure itself. In 1973, restoration work was commenced on the stables, the coach house, and the coachman's cottage. The chief stonemason and supervisor was Mr Ted Eling. The National Trust reopened Marble Hill as a ruin in 1975. In 1979, the tower reconstruction was completed. In 1980, Marble Hill was listed on the South Australian Heritage Register.

During the 1980s, the Country Fire Service used the tower as a bushfire lookout. In 1992, the National Trust closed the site to the public due to insufficient funding, and the site reverted to the administration of the Department of Environment and Heritage (DEH). The following year, the Government called for expressions of interest in the development and management of the site. Mayor of East Torrens, Isabel Bishop, called for the building to be restored and used as a "VIP status hotel".

In 1994, the Friends of Parks volunteer group "Friends of Marble Hill" was formed in order to facilitate public access, open days and functions, while DEH retained responsibility for maintenance and funding, and the National Parks and Wildlife Service provided vegetation and land-care services. Four years later, in 1998, DEH commissioned a Conservation and Dilapidation Report which investigated the structural integrity of the ruins and the possibility of reconstruction. The Friends of Marble Hill group ceased operating after the property was put up for sale by the State Government in 2007.

In 2009, a group called Encompass Technology wrote to the Governor of South Australia supposedly on behalf of the Kaurna people, asserting sovereignty over the Marble Hill ruins, and the Warriparinga Living Kaurna Cultural Centre in Marion, and claiming that they were owed nearly $50 million in rent. The South Australian Government subsequently rejected the claim.

=== Reconstruction ===
In March 2007, the State Government of South Australia again called for expressions of interest in the future development and management of the Marble Hill site. Twelve interested parties sought information, and one proposal was received. In October 2009, the property was sold to Edwin Michell and Dr. Patricia Bishop, a local couple. Michell has a private investment company and Bishop is a sister of former Federal M.P. Julie Bishop and has been involved in restoration of several historic Adelaide Hills properties.

Among the conditions of a heritage agreement attached to the certificate of title are that the ruin will be reconstructed in consultation with a heritage architect, and that public open days will continue. The work is being undertaken with a strong focus on local suppliers and the revival of artisan trades, under the supervision of builder Andrew Green. The first phase of reconstruction was completed in December 2015, with the installation of a 7-tonne (15,000 lb) copper-roofed tower lantern. The second phase of the project was expected to be complete by early 2019 but remains ongoing.

== See also ==
- Government House, South Australia
- Old Government House, South Australia
- Governor of South Australia
- Marble Hill Ruins, South Australia
- Kaurna people
