= Belair National Park =

Protected area in South Australia

- IUCN category II (national park)
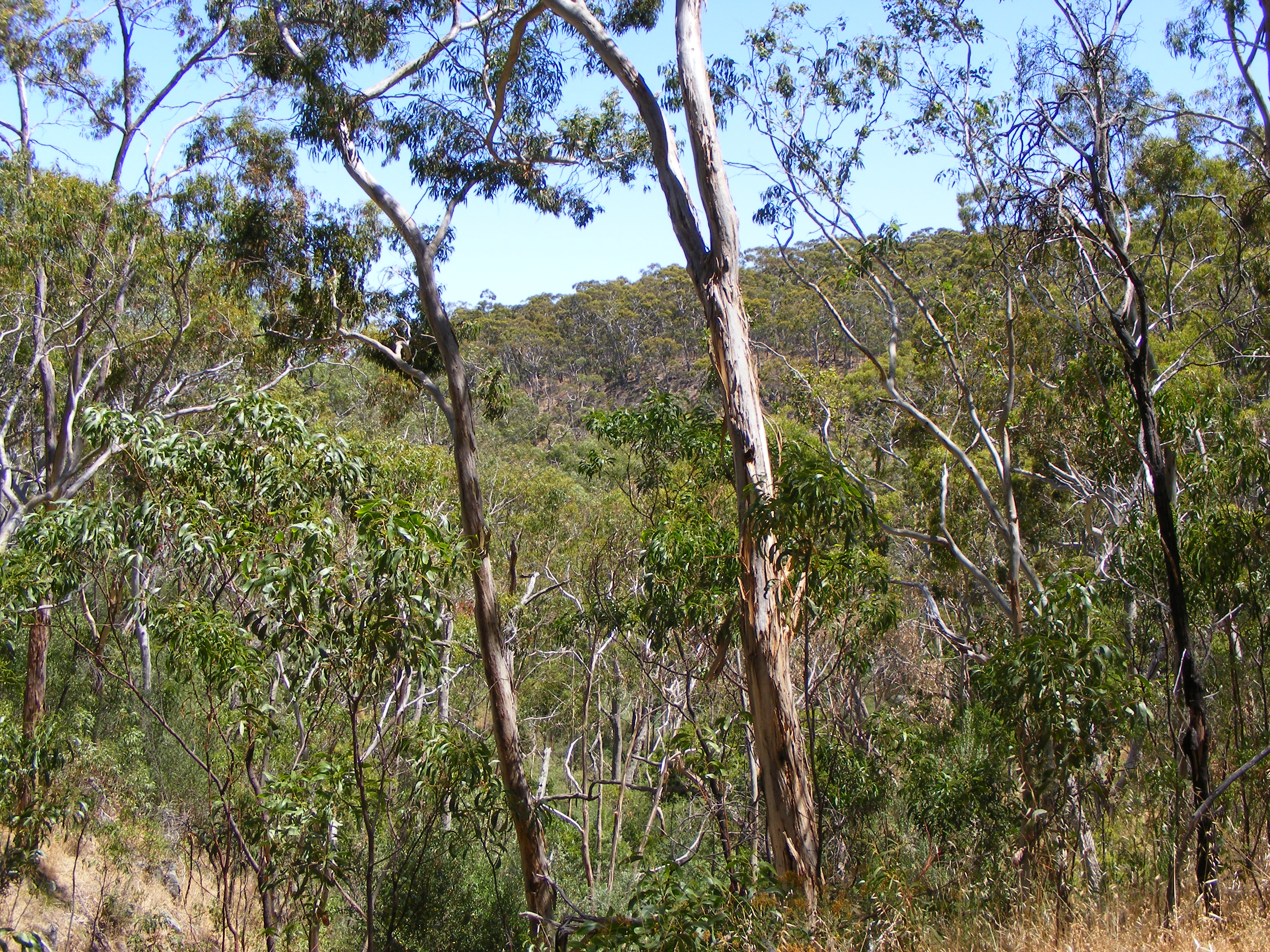
- View from the Waterfall Hike

- Location within South Australia
- Location: South Australia
- Nearest city: Adelaide, South Australia
- Coordinates: 35°00′47″S 138°39′21″E
- Area: 8.35 km^{2} (3.22 sq mi)
- Established: 1891
- Visitors: 358619 (in 2003)
- Governing body: Department of Environment and Water
- Website: https://www.parks.sa.gov.au/find-a-park/Browse_by_region/Adelaide_Hills/belair-national-park

Belair National Park (formerly known as the National Park and Belair Recreation Park) is a protected area in Belair, South Australia, 9 kilometres (5.6 miles) southeast of Adelaide city centre; it covers an area of 835 hectares (2,060 acres). It was proclaimed in 1891 and was the first national park in South Australia, second in Australia (after Sydney's Royal National Park which was proclaimed in 1879) and the tenth in the world. The national park lies within the Adelaide Hills and Mitcham council area, and forms part of a chain of protected areas located along the Adelaide Hills Face Zone. The national park is administered by the Department of Environment, Water and Natural Resources.

== Naming ==
For most of its existence, it has been known as the "National Park". Between the years 1972 and 1991 it was known as the "Belair Recreation Park". In 1991, the Belair Recreation Park was abolished and the land that it occupied was constituted as a national park and given the name “Belair National Park”.

== History ==
Belair was originally inhabited by the Kaurna Aboriginal people. The area was called Pradli, which means "baldness", because the appearance of the area when looking south from the Adelaide Plains was "bald like the moon". The first Europeans to set foot in the area were crewmen from the Coromandel in 1837. The first European to settle in the area was a squatter, E. Nicholas Foott, who in 1839 dug a well and built a stone cottage, spending £500 despite not holding a title to the land. In 1840, South Australian governor George Gawler set the land aside for a government farm, forcing Foott to leave the land, though he was paid £300 for his improvements to the land (he later became a member of the Victorian Legislative Assembly).

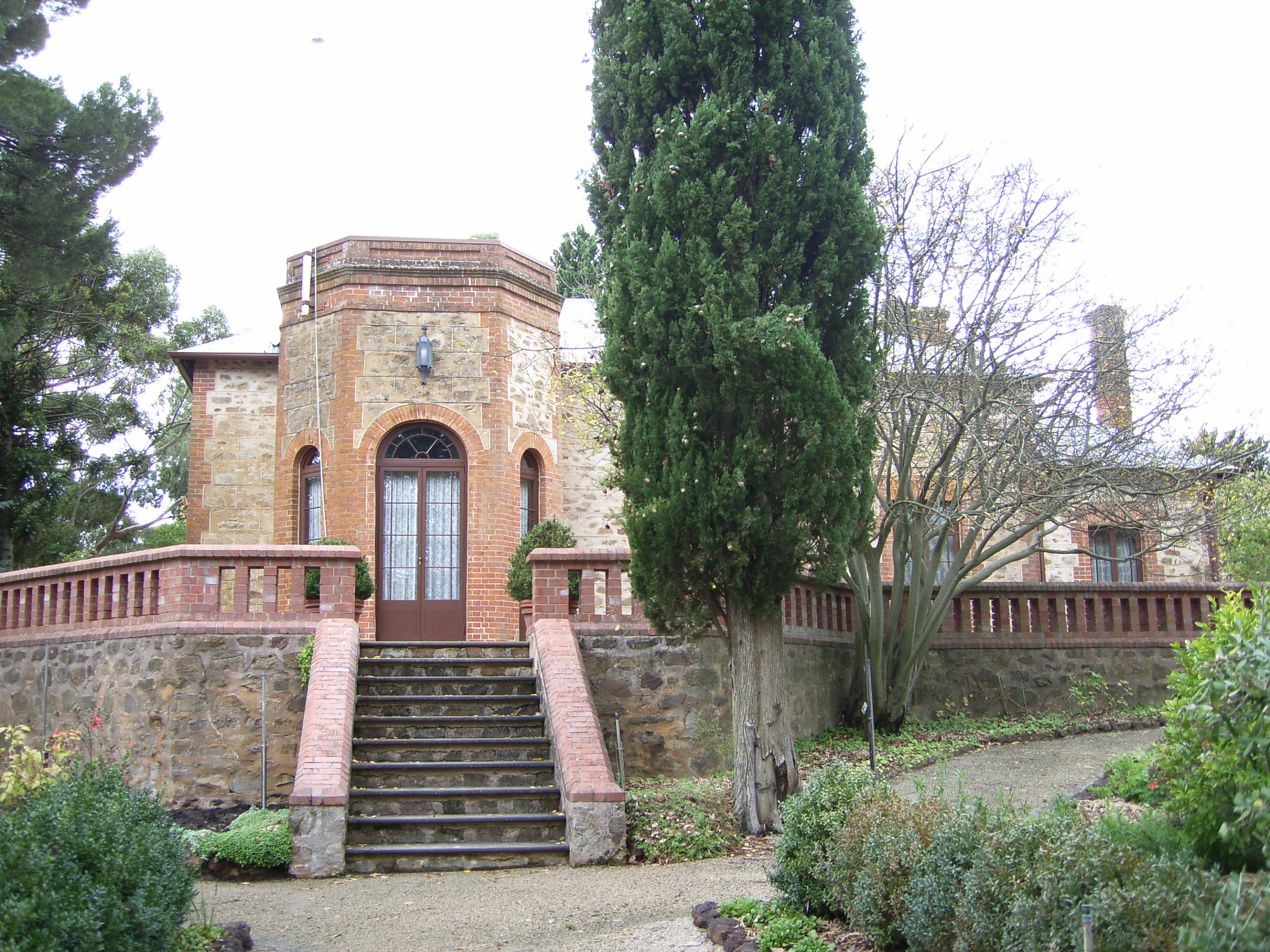
Old Government House, a historic building in Belair National Park.

Governor Grey arrived in May 1841, with a remit to cut Government expenditure and raise revenue, and announced in the Gazette of 15 July of the intended sale by auction of the land. This, however, did not take place, and in the depression of 1841–1842 a dozen or so unemployed men and their families were allowed to settle there temporarily. In June 1844, four sections at the western end (874, 875, 878 and 882) totalling about 400 acres (160 ha) were sold. In 1848 a cottage, long since demolished, was erected alongside the creek as a residence for the farm manager, and for occasional use by the Governor. In 1858 a residence, complete with swimming pool, was built as a "summer house" for the Governor, Sir Richard MacDonnell (served 1855–1862), and used by his successors Sir Anthony Musgrave (1873–1877), and Sir William Jervois (1877–1883), until the more imposing edifice at Marble Hill was completed in 1880. Now known as Old Government House, the building is heritage-listed.

From 1874 to 1884, the Government Farm was managed by William Cook (1815–1897), father of Edith Agnes Cook. His eldest daughter Katherine wrote an article on that period of the farm's history for the South Australian Archives. His predecessor was Ebenezer Jarvis (c. 1829–1897), who left to take a post as manager of Government House, Adelaide. Two great bushfires occurred during their time; in 1866/1867 and 1877, when many old trees were destroyed. Proposals in 1881 to sell off parts of small portions of the land were opposed by Walter Gooch, James Page and the Australian Natives Association, which led in 1883 to an Act of Parliament prohibiting its sale. In 1888 further agitation by Gooch, Arthur Falconer Robin (1867–1906) and Samuel Dixon of the Royal Society of South Australia led to a parliamentary decision that the Government Farm be established as a public park, and after some delays the National Park Act received the Governor's assent in January 1892. Another person given partial credit was William Henry Selway of the Field Naturalists' Section of the Royal Society.

A nine-hole golf course was constructed in the southwest corner of the park in 1934 in an attempt by the state government to raise money for the park's maintenance during the Great Depression. The course was expanded to 18 holes in 1941, redeveloped in the 1970s, and sold to a private operator in 1982. The Belair Park Country Club ran the course until it went into administration in January 2018. The state government proposed to repurpose part of the golf course and build a seven-pitch soccer field for the Sturt Lions Football Club, but this proposal met with backlash from the local community during the public consultation period, with more than 8,000 people signing a petition opposing the development. The day after the consultation period ended, Environment Minister David Speirs announced that the plan would not go ahead, and in October 2021, the government announced that high-impact development in the former golf course would be banned and that parts of the land would be re-vegetated and returned to the rest of the park.

In 1985, the Belair National Park was declared as a state heritage area under the South Australian Heritage Act 1978-1980. In 1987, the nearby National Park railway station was closed.

=== Weed invasion ===
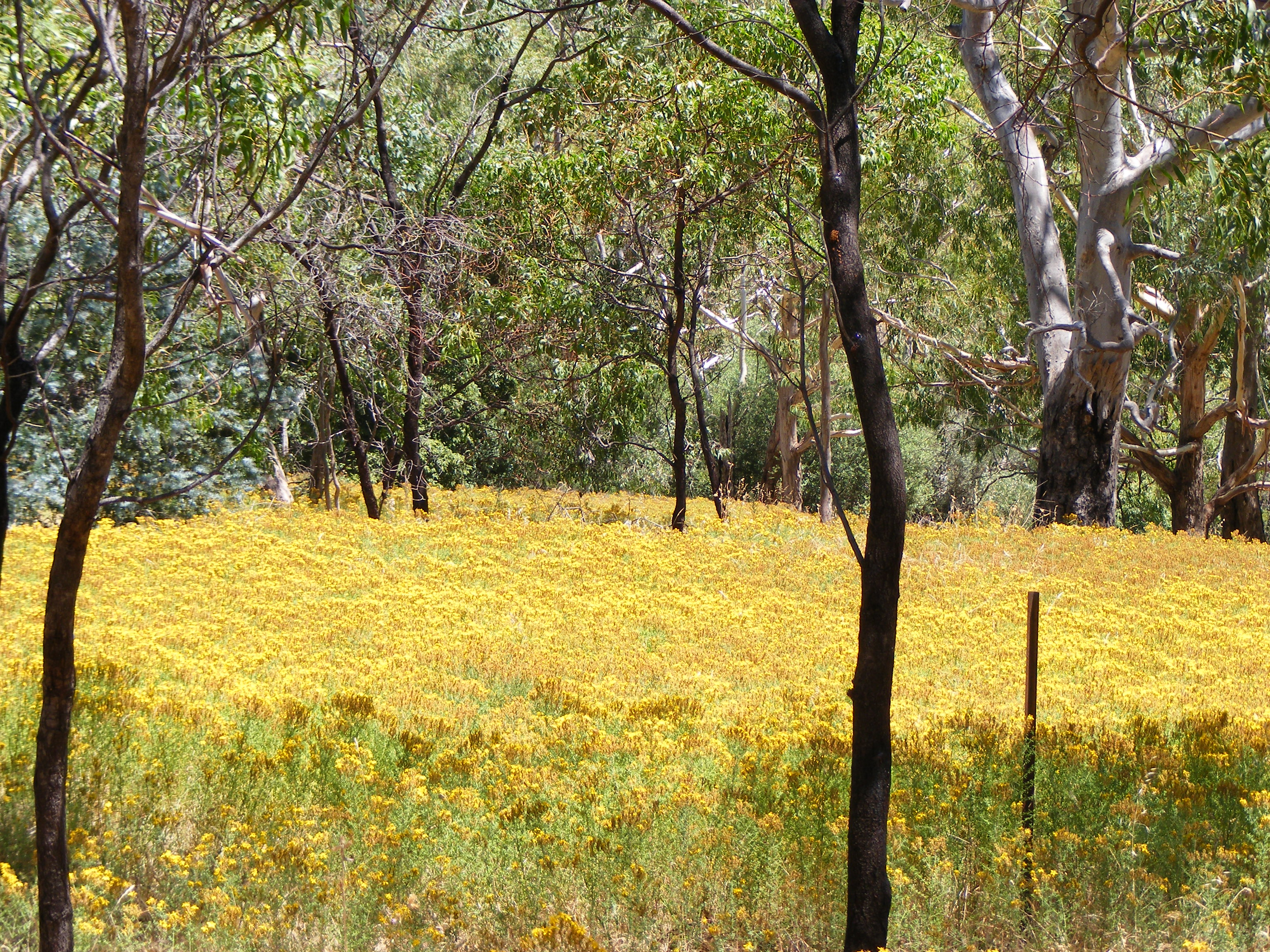
Invasive weed Hypericum perforatum in the Park

The first European people traversed the Belair area in 1837. In 1840, Governor Gawler raised a government farm on which sick horses and bullocks from government departments could be agisted. In 1881, a proposal was put forward for small agricultural holdings and also, the national park was dedicated, making it the first National Park in South Australia. Many exotic and non-indigenous plants were introduced and are now found in the park as weeds. Numerous native plants, such as Cootamundra wattle, have become environmental weeds after being introduced into areas outside their natural range.

The Belair National Park has suffered major disturbance to its natural ecosystems and natural vegetation communities through the accidental invasion of non-indigenous plants as well as the deliberate introduction of exotic and non-indigenous plants to certain zones within the park. In spite of these problems, several remnant stands of rare native plant species endemic to the Mt Lofty Ranges can be found there in season, mostly along tracks in less visited areas of the park's walking trail system. Both Donkey Orchids and Spider Orchids are among several diminutive flowers usually seen late winter each year.

A volunteer organisation named Friends of Belair National Park was formed in 1985, aiming to reduce the effect of invasive weeds within the park. The group meets regularly to manually or chemically remove accessible weeds, and also hosts nature walks and other events to increase community engagement with land management.

== Playford Lake ==
Belair is also home to Playford Lake, a small manmade lake this easy to access area has upgraded accessible toilets, free barbecues, walking trails and a wide range of wildlife, including ducks, kangaroos and turtles. Swimming and fishing are not allowed in Playford lake.

== Geography ==
Belair National Park is situated 13 km south east of Adelaide city centre in South Australia, in the suburb of Belair, and is one of the few remaining areas of relatively undisturbed native vegetation in the Adelaide Hills.

=== Walking Trails ===
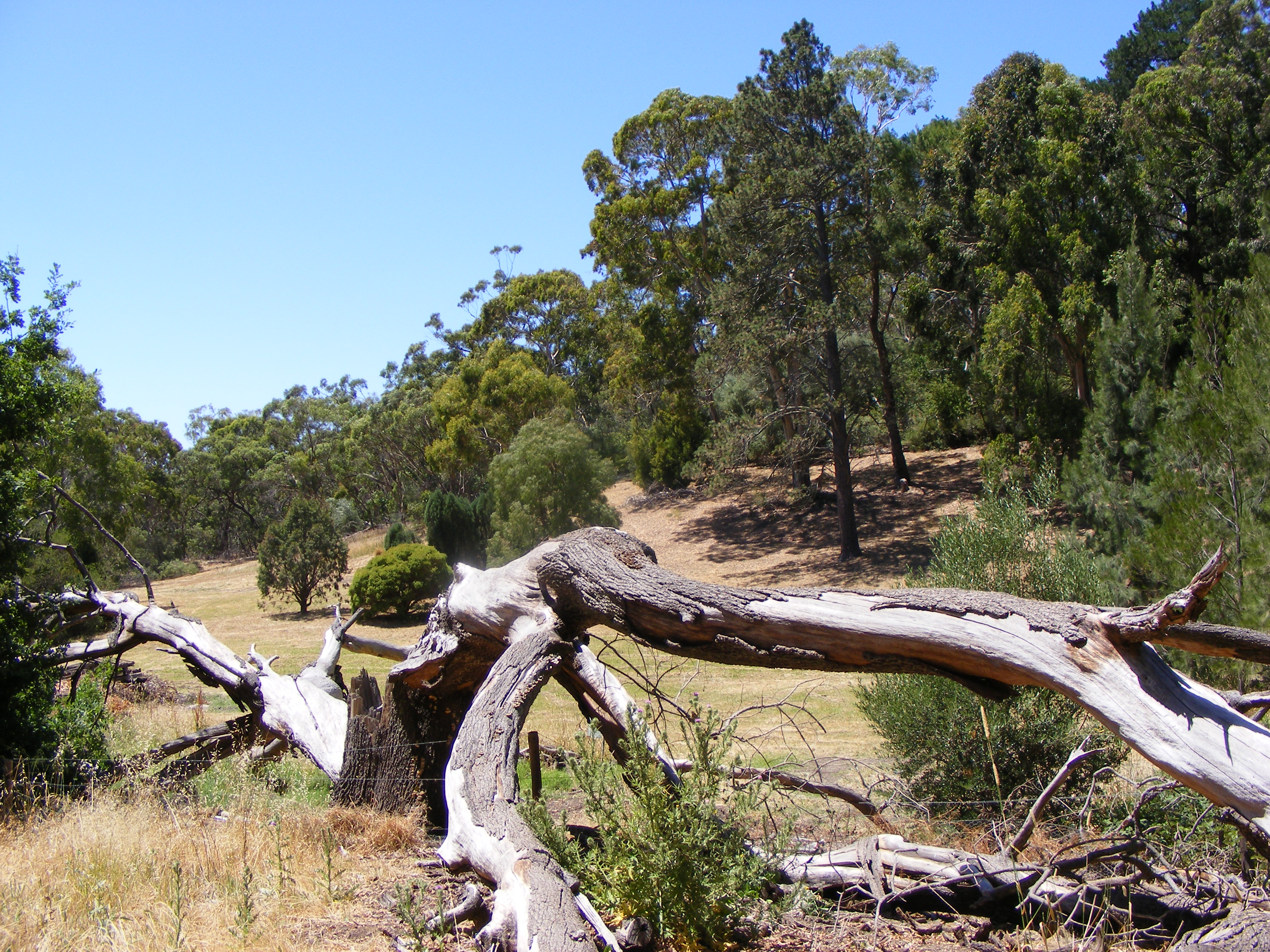
The end of the Waterfall Hike

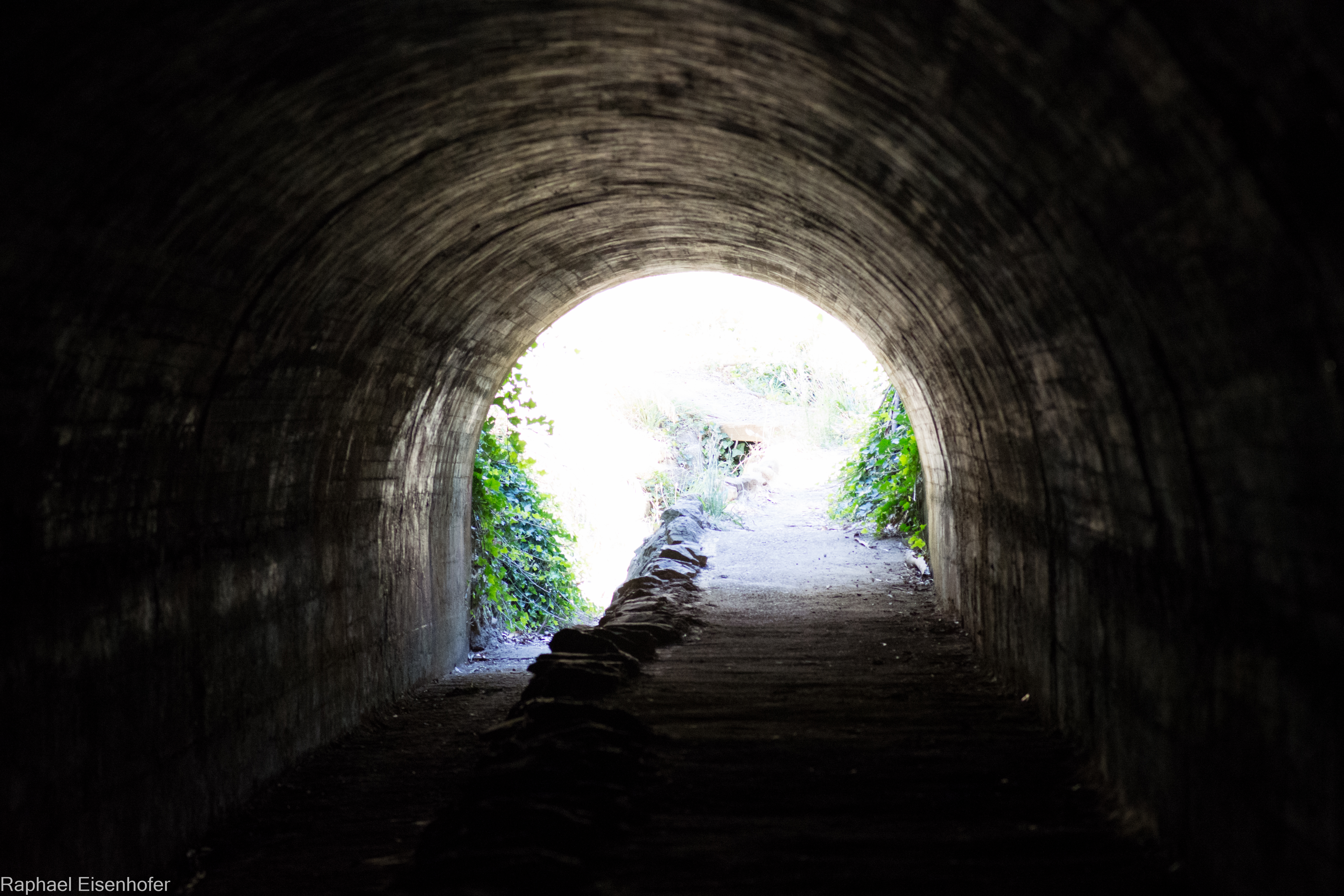
Tunnel at Belair National Park

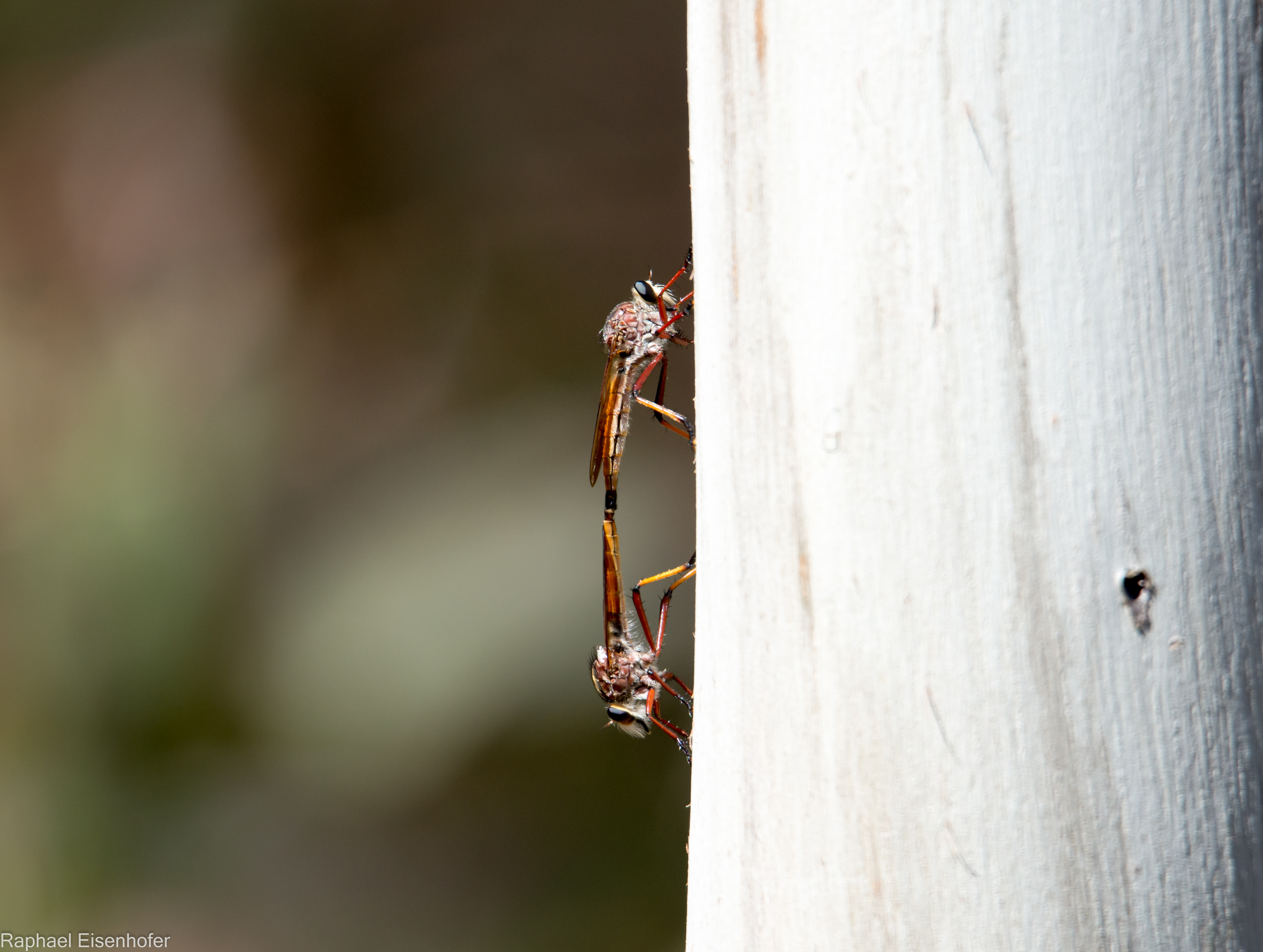
Mating odonata in Belair National Park

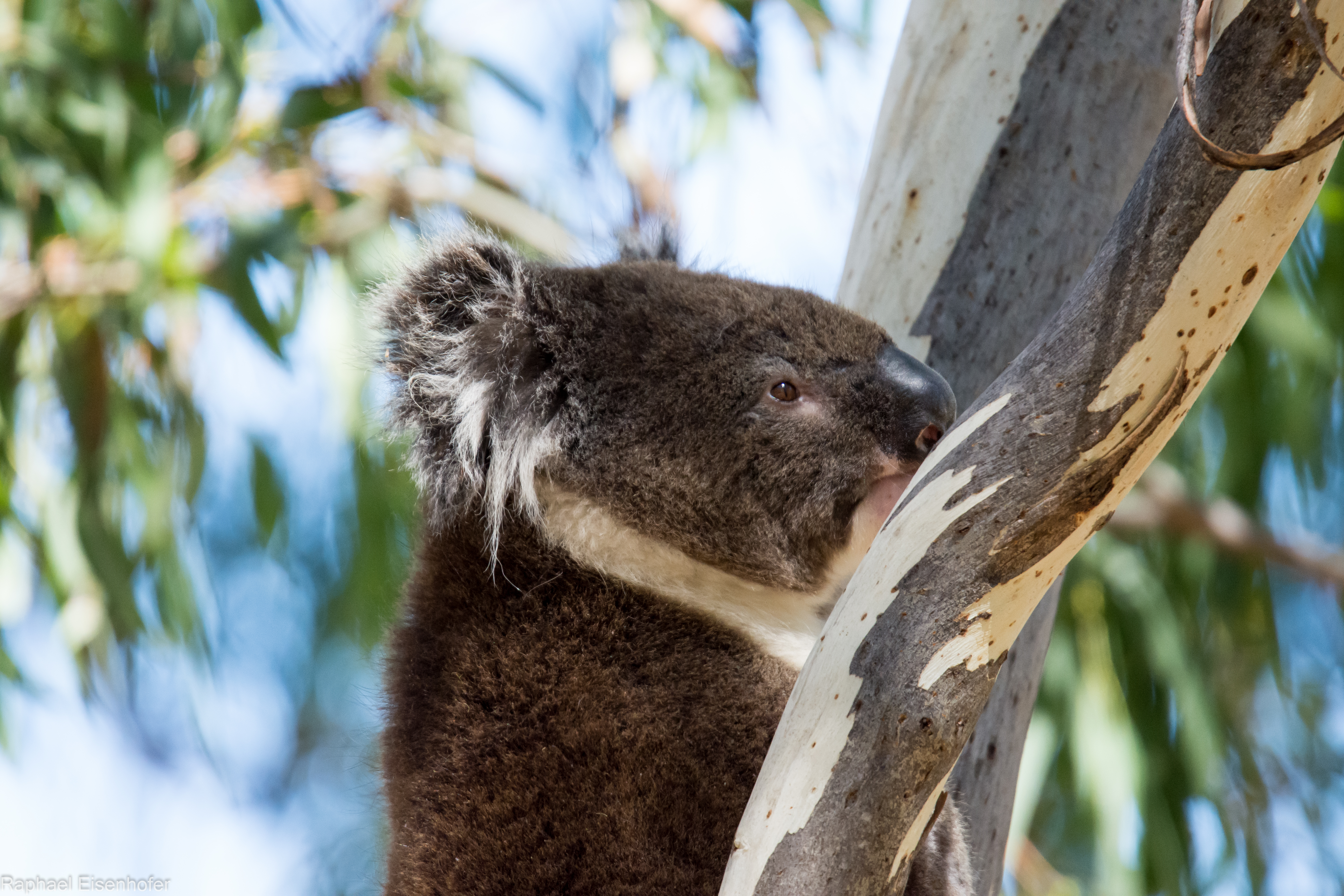
Koala in Belair National Park

Wood Duck Dawdle

A short circuit around Playford Lake.

Lorikeet Loop Walk

A 3 km circuit walk from the main car park to the Adventure Playground.

Valley Loop Walk

A 3 km circuit walk to Long Gully.

Microcarpa Walk

A 4 km circuit departing from near Playford Lake.

Waterfall Hike

A 6.5 km circuit that visits the park's waterfalls and travels to the higher areas away from the recreation areas.

Yurrebilla Trail

The first 5 km of the Yurrebilla Trail is in the national park. It begins at the Belair railway station and continues toward the Lower Waterfall before departing the park at the Sheoak Road boundary.

Belairs national park signifies South Australia's commitment to preserving the natural areas for both conservation and recreation.

== See also ==
- Protected areas of South Australia
- List of protected areas in Adelaide
