= Old Government House, South Australia =

Former official residence in Belair, South Australia, Australia

Coordinates: 35.008215°S 138.648185°E

Old Government House
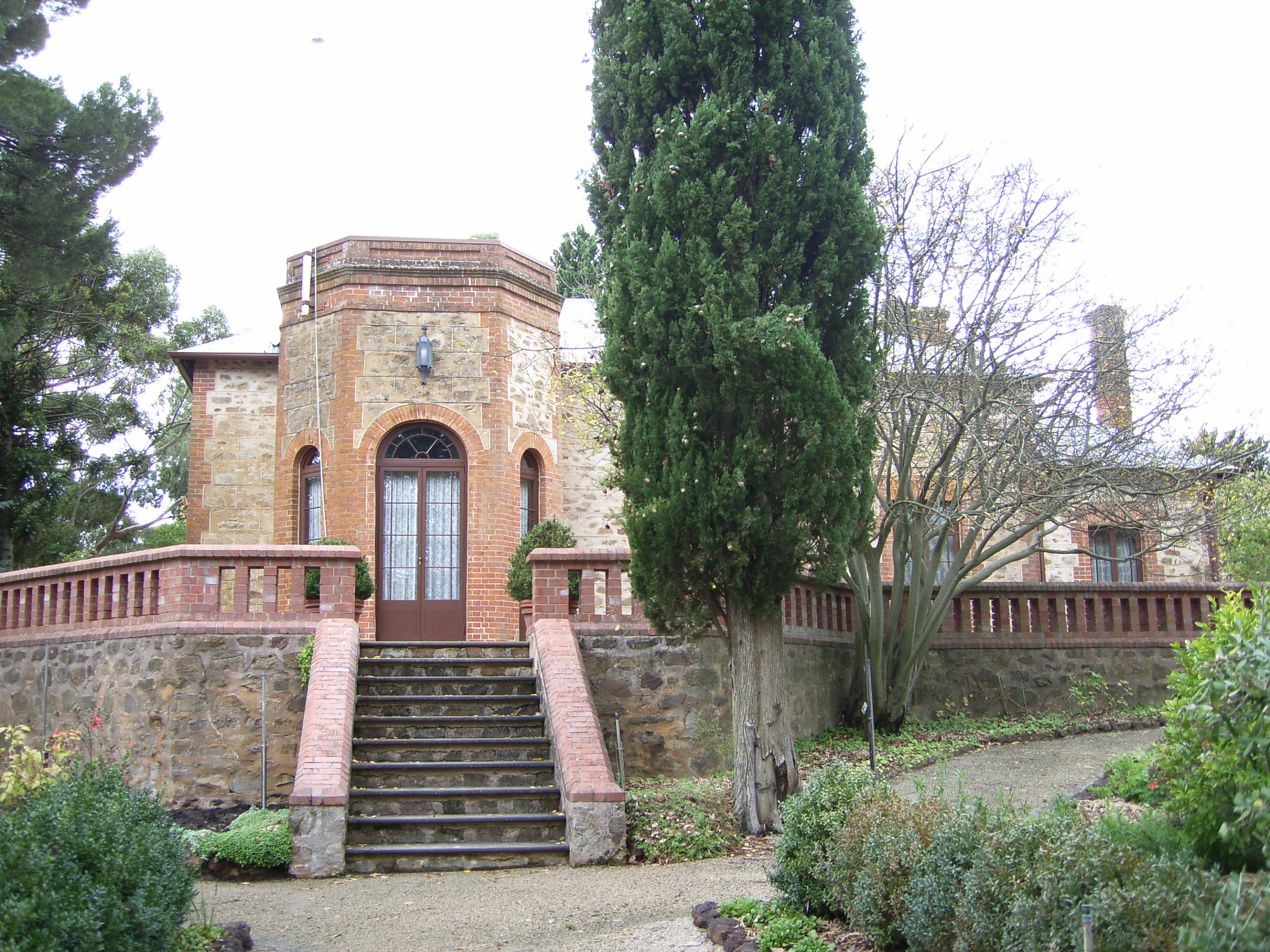
- Old Government House in 2006

General information
- Type: Former vice-regal summer residence
- Location: Belair National Park, South Australia, Australia
- Completed: 1860

Technical details
- Material: Sandstone, brick and timber

Design and construction
- Architect: Edward Hamilton
- Main contractor: Charles Farr

South Australian Heritage Register
- Official name: Governors Former Summer Residence
- Designated: 24 July 1980
- Reference no.: 10662

Old Government House is a historic building located in Belair National Park, South Australia, and was South Australia's first official vice-regal summer residence of the Governor of South Australia from 1860 to 1880, and was used by governors Richard Graves MacDonnell (1855–62), Dominick Daly (1862-68) and William Jervois (1877–80). It was constructed from local sandstone, with the red-brick for the quoins sourced from the Blackwood brickworks, and a native timber shingle roof. The residence's indoor plunge-pool was reportedly the first in the colony.

== History ==
=== Government Farm ===
Within a few years of the settlement of South Australia, the colonial government decided to establish a "Government Farm" for the purpose of agisting horses and bullocks, and providing hay and fodder. The area chosen was the upper reaches of the Sturt River; In addition to its suitability as farmland, governor George Gawler thought the area would be ideal for the establishment of a summer residence. In July 1840, in a highly irregular transaction, thirteen surveyed sections of 80 acres (32 ha), plus 1,000 acres (400 ha) of rough country to the east were purchased. The sale was dubious in that it was paid by private promissory note, rather than through official government channels. Additionally, the sale document did not mention three of the 80 acre sections, nor the large section of rough country. When Gawler was replaced by George Grey in May 1841, the colony's finances were in considerable debt.

As a fundraising measure, the newly established farm was offered for public sale. However, realising that their title to the land was dubious, the government cancelled the sale. Ironically, the government's questionable title to the land ensured it remained in public ownership. The five most westerly sections of the farm (part of the original ten sections) were disposed as land grants in 1844. They were developed as orchards, vineyards and market gardens, eventually becoming the suburbs of Glenalta and Monalta in the housing boom of the mid 20th century. This sale left the Government Farm at approximately the same extent that it remains, as Belair National Park, to the present day.

=== Government Farm Cottage ===
South Australia's economy recovered in the 1850s due to the Victorian gold rush. Governor MacDonnell, having already extended Government House in the city, commissioned the construction of a vice-regal retreat on the Government Farm in 1858. It was designed by the Colonial Architect Edward Hamilton, with assistance from R.A. Hyndman and G.K. Soward. Charles Farr was chosen as the chief builder. When completed in 1860, the building contained two main rooms (a dining room and a bedroom), a small office, bathroom, dressing room and cellar. A large five-sided bay window in the dining room had French-doors which opened onto a wide, tiled terrace. The stone used in construction of the walls was sourced from a local quarry, most likely the one that remains visible today to the east of the building. The roof was built with shingles of stringybark (Eucalyptus obliqua) cut from the ridges of the farm. The total cost of the building was in the vicinity of £1600, a substantial sum for the time. Following a fiery debate in Parliament regarding the expenditure, the government conveniently "lost" the final receipts.

=== Heritage listings ===
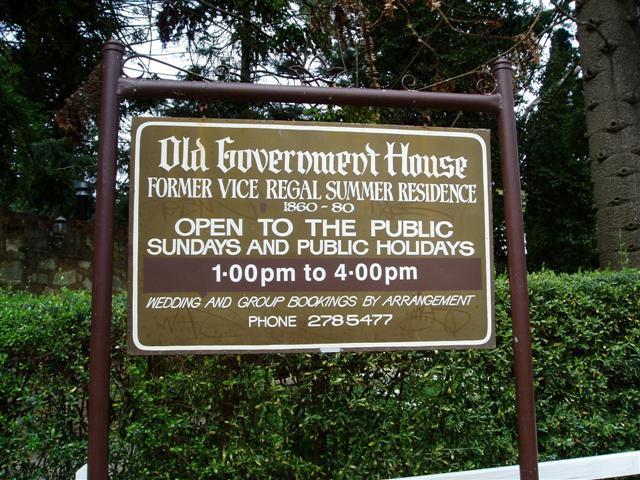
Old Government House entrance sign.

The house was listed on the now-defunct Register of the National Estate on 21 March 1978 and on the South Australian Heritage Register on 24 July 1980 as the "Governor’s Former Summer Residence."

== Current use ==
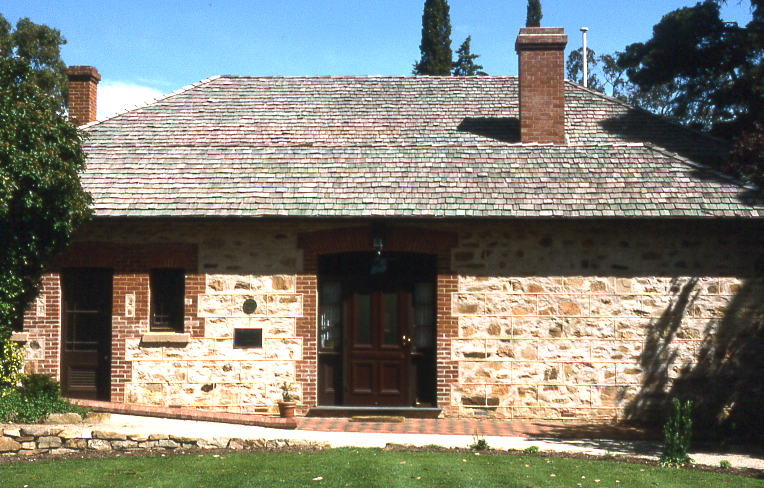
Old Government House

The house was superseded by a larger summer residence at Marble Hill, completed in 1880. It was then used by the curator of the Department of Woods and Forests Nursery (also located in Belair National Park) until it was transferred to the National Parks and Wildlife Reserves in 1961. Minor renovation work was carried out and the building was opened as a museum. More extensive renovations in the 1970s and again in 2002-03 restored the building to its original grandeur. Old Government House is now cared for by the Friends of Old Government House, a member group of Friends of Parks Inc. It is now a tourist attraction and is open to the public on the first and third Sunday and public holidays. Closed in July, Christmas Day, Good Friday and Easter Sunday.

== See also ==
- Government House, Adelaide
- Marble Hill, South Australia
