= Black Sunday bushfires =

1955 bushfires in South Australia

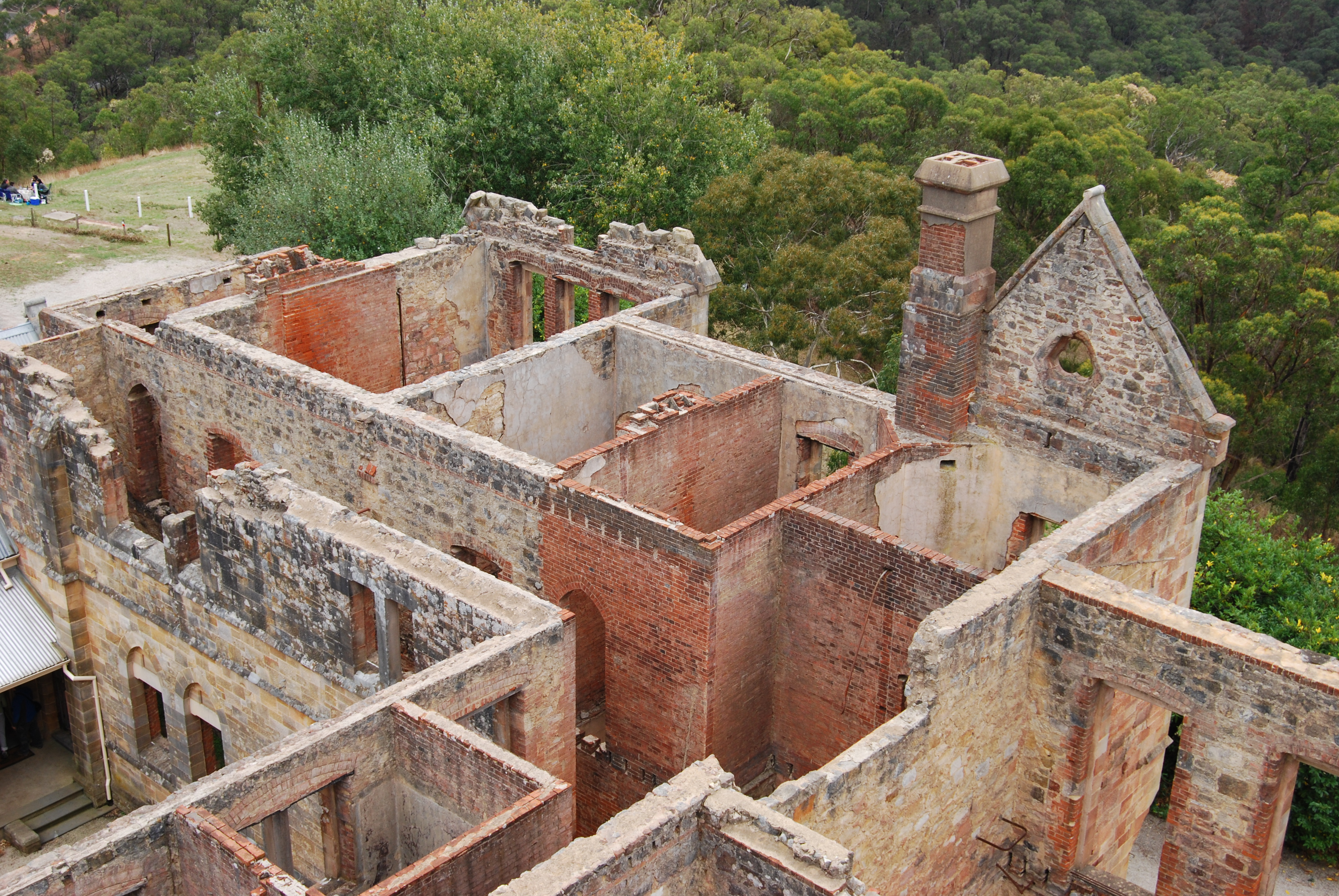
- Ruins of the summer residence of the Governor of South Australia, which was destroyed in the fire
- Date: 2 January 1955
- Location: South Australia
- Coordinates: 34°54′40″S 138°42′26″E

Statistics
- Burned area: 39,000–155,000 hectares (150–600 sq mi)

Impacts
- Deaths: 2
- Injuries: 50+
- Structures lost: 40 houses

Ignition
- Cause: Downed power lines

The Black Sunday bushfires were a series of bushfires that broke out across South Australia on 2 January 1955. Extreme morning temperatures coupled with strong north-westerly winds contributed to the breakout of numerous fires in Adelaide Hills, Jamestown, Waterloo, Kingston and Millicent. Most were caused by sparks from powerlines in the wind.

Around 1,000 Emergency Fire Service volunteers from 60 brigades were tasked to the fires, but were overwhelmed. At 10am, the EFS head office requested urgent public assistance. Around 2,500 citizens volunteered. The fires were contained by 9:30pm, thanks largely to a fortuitous change in the weather and widespread public assistance.

The fires resulted in two deaths, destroyed 40 homes and numerous other buildings, and caused more than A$4 million worth of property damage, most notably the destruction of the Governor's summer residence at Marble Hill. Governor Robert George, his family and staff were lucky to escape with their lives. The Premier, Sir Thomas Playford, also narrowly escaped death, sheltering with five other men in a patch of hoed earth near Cherryville. The burnt area was estimated at as much as 160,000 hectares (600 sq mi) stretching from One Tree Hill to Strathalbyn; however, other sources put the area at closer to 39,000 hectares (150 sq mi).

== See also ==
- List of wildfires
