= Tjilbruke =

Creation being in Ramindjeri (an Aboriginal Australian group) mythology

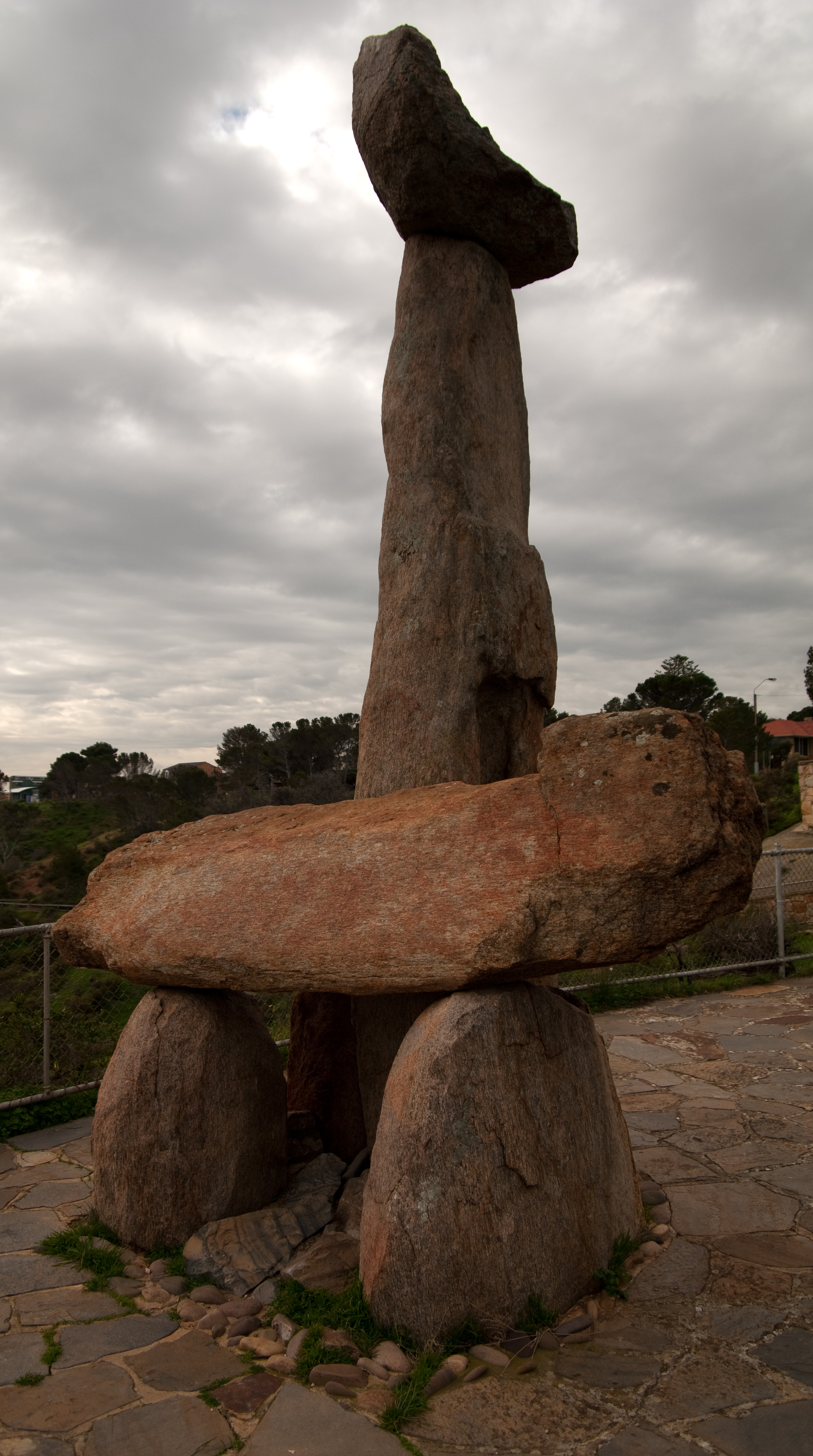
Representation of Tjilbruke bearing his nephew. Created by John Dowie, it is located at Kingston Park, South Australia.

Tjirbuki (also Tjirbuk, Tjelbruki, Tjirbruki, Tjirbruke or Tjilbruke) is an important creation ancestor for the Rapid Bay people of the Fleurieu Peninsula in the Australian state of South Australia.
Tjirbuki was a Rapid Bay man of the Ramindjeri people. Since the 1970's Tjirbuki's story has been misattributed to Kaurna Dreaming dating back about 11,000 years. The Tjilbruke Dreaming Track or Tjilbruke Dreaming Trail is a major Dreaming trail, which connects sites from within metropolitan Adelaide southwards as far as Cape Jervis, some of which are Aboriginal sacred sites of great significance.

== Man and creator-being ==
The Tjirbuki Dreaming pre-dates European contact, probably arising when the "Adelaide plains tribe", the Kaurna, settled the area at least 2,000 years BP (as evidenced by archaeological finds at Hallett Cove, where Kaurna campsites succeeded those of the Kartan people of Kangaroo Island, who had been there tens of thousands of years earlier). Kaurna Yerta Parngkarra (Kaurna tribal country) stretches from Cape Jervis in the south, to Crystal Brook in the north, west to the Mount Lofty Ranges, across to Gulf Saint Vincent, including the plains and city of Adelaide.

The Tjirbuki story became part of the southern Kaurna Dreaming. It is more than a creation story; it assumes the status of a religion for some, sets standards and rules for living, and provides spiritual meaning. It is both lore and law. The lore tells of a time when all the people lived in accord with peaceful trading laws which governed all their lives. The law was brought to the land, and "Old Tjirbuki", who lived as an ordinary man, a keeper of the law which came from the south, after the water covered the land (when Wongga Yerlo, or Gulf St Vincent, was created.). Tjilbruke was renowned as a "great hunter and firemaker", and a hero of the Kaurna. He also played a role in helping to protect the animals and the territory of the Kaurna, while at the same time having respect towards neighbouring peoples. It was part of his and Kaurna way of life to value all life, whether animal or human.

== Variant spellings and versions ==
In about 1940, anthropologist Ronald Berndt recorded the spellings "Tjirbuki" or "Tjirbuk" from Ngarrindjeri man Albert Karlowan, as the name of a small wetland. Anthropologist Norman Tindale of the South Australian Museum recorded the spelling as Tjirbuki, but Tjilbruke is the commonly used spelling today.

Since the early 1980s the Williams family, of the Mullawirra and Mulla mai/Kudnarto clans, have been senior custodians of the Tjilbruke story, and Karl Winda Telfer has collaborated with Gavin Malone to share the story. Milerum, also known as Clarence Long, has also been a contributor. The Tjilbruke story is part of a bigger and more complex story known as the Munaintya Dreaming, that has been passed down through oral tradition through the years.

== Tjilbruke Dreaming story ==
The tale of Tjilbruke's journey down the east coast of Wongga Erlo/Gulf St Vincent is the best known of all Kaurna Dreaming stories, and has become a symbol of renewal of the Kaurna culture, although it was first recorded from Ngarrindjeri sources by Tindale and later Ronald and Catherine Berndt. It was recorded by Tindale over a period of many years up to 1964, but it was not until 1987 that he published the most complete version hitherto published, as The Wanderings of Tjirbruki: a tale of the Kaurna People of Adelaide.

The story starts with an emu (kari) hunt by three men, Kulultuwi, Jurawi and Tetjawi. They were all nephews of Tjilbruke, but Kulultuwi had a special relationship to his uncle, as he was the son of his sister, and known as his nangari; the other two were his half-brothers. Tjilbruke was responsible for Kulultuwi, as an uncle as well as a father, to help him grow up correctly and do the right thing. While the young men went hunting in the Tarndanya (Adelaide) area, across Mikkawomma (the plains) to Yerta Bulti (Port River estuary), driving the birds up Mudlangga (Le Fevre Peninsula), Tjilrbuke went fishing at Witu-wattingga (the Brighton area). After finishing his fishing, he set up camp at Tulukudangga/Tulukudank (Kingston Park) and then started tracking an emu southwards. When Kulultuwi returned to the area, he found himself tracking the same emu as his uncle, which he was forbidden to do. However he killed the emu, and Tjilbruke, although initially angry, forgave him when he gave him some of the emu meat. (In one version of the story, although Kulultuwi was not supposed to have killed the kari ahead of his uncle, Tjilbruke gave him permission to do so, as long as he gave him some of the meat.)

While Kulultuwi was cooking the emu meat over a fire, Jurawi and Tetjawi killed him with their spears, as punishment for his breaking the law of the clan. The brothers took the body to their clan campsite at Warriparri (Sturt River) and told them the story, and they started to dry the body with smoke, as custom dictated. After Tjilbruke found out, he was very upset, and speared the two nephews to death (in retaliation, applying the law, being a man of the law), before carrying Kulultuwi's body to Tulukudangga, where an inquest and ceremony to complete the smoking of the body was held.

The story goes on to tell of how six freshwater springs were created by Tjilbruke's tears, as he carried the body of his dead nephew from Warriparri across to the coast and southwards past Aldinga Beach and onto the west coast of the Fleurieu Peninsula to Rapid Bay. The Dreaming includes locations in several geographic areas: the Adelaide Plains, the Fleurieu Peninsula, on the south coast at Rosetta Head (The Bluff) near Victor Harbour, and also in the Adelaide Hills at Brukunga; so it takes in Ramindjeri and Peramangk country.

After Kulultuwi's body had been smoked and dried, Tjilbruke picked up the body and carried it firstly to Tulukudangga/Tulukudank. Here some versions of the story diverge slightly; one says that he wept at this point and his tears created this spring, while another says that Tulukudangga was an existing spring at that place. From Tulukudangga, Tjilbruke carried Kulultuwi's body all the way down the eastern side of Gulf St Vincent and onto and down the west coast of the Fleurieu Peninsula. At sunset every night of his journey Tjilbruke cried over his nephew's body, and his tears transformed into freshwater springs at six locations:

- Kareildung (Hallett Cove)
- Tainbarang (Port Noarlunga)
- Potartang (Red Ochre Cove, near Moana Beach)
- Ruwarunga (Port Willunga)
- Witawali (Sellicks Beach)
- Kongaratinga (near Wirrina Cove, or Yankalilla)

He arrived at a cave (perki) at Rapid Bay, near Cape Jervis, and then emerged from underground at Wateira nengal (Mount Hayfield) and created yellow ochre. He walked on to Lonkowar (The Bluff/Rosetta Head, in Ramindjeri country), near Victor Harbor, where he killed a grey currawong, rubbed its fat onto his body and tied its feathers onto his arms, before transforming himself into a glossy ibis (or other wading bird; in some sources, a blue crane) as his spirit left his body. His body became the pyrite outcrop at Brukunga.

Saddened by these events Tjilbruke decided he no longer wished to live as a man. His spirit became a bird, the Tjilbruke (Glossy Ibis), and his body became a martowalan (memorial) in the form of the baruke (iron pyrites) outcrop at Barrukungga, the place of hidden fire (Brukunga - north of Nairne in the Adelaide Hills). Tjilbruke was a master at fire-making.

== Creation of the Tjilbruke Dreaming Track (1986–2006) ==
The Tjilbruke Monuments Committee was formed by Robert Edwards of the South Australian Museum (SAM), sculptor John Dowie and staff of the Sunday Mail in 1971. It was largely due to the efforts of Edwards and other non-Aboriginal people that drove the early promotion of Kaurna cultural tourism. A public appeal helped to fund the marking of the trail by plaques and sculptures, to pay homage to the Kaurna culture and to attract and educate tourists. In 1972 John Dowie created the sculpture known as the Tjilbruke Monument at Kingston Park, within the City of Holdfast Bay.

Cairns were created at significant points along the Tjilbruke Trail articles and booklets were published in the 1980s, and the trail was included in Aboriginal Studies curricula. However, there was little input from Kaurna people at this stage.

In 1981, Georgina Williams (Note: Williams is one of a number of Kaurna people, including Lewis O'Brien, Gladys Elphick, and Alice Rigney, who "are the driving force behind a cultural revival" and were responsible for introducing Kaura perspectives into the SA education curriculum.) (SAM) began to research the trail. It was important to her "because Tjilbruke was to me an example of the law of my people and of the law related to the land and the places along the coast". A number of the sites have special spiritual significance, and in the 1980s, work by the successor to the Tjilbruke Monuments Committee, the Tjilbruke Track Committee, on the track became a central focus of Kaurna identity. The committee was later renamed the Kaurna Heritage Committee and then grew into the Kaurna Aboriginal Community and Heritage Association (KACHA) in the 1990s, which became recognised as the representative body for all Kaurna people on cultural heritage and other matters.

The Tjilbruke Dreaming Track, or Tjilbruke Dreaming Trail, marked by commemorative plaques at ten locations, was created during the 150th anniversary of British colonisation of South Australia (1986), along the coast in close proximity to the sea shore. Various events, mostly celebrating white history, were held throughout the year, with the final celebrations on 28 December 1986, 150th anniversary of the Proclamation of South Australia. However the Dreaming Track was one of about 30 Aboriginal projects which were considered, and was a major undertaking. While the original idea had been to erect a monument at Rosetta Head/The Bluff at Victor Harbor, the site where Tjilbruke's spirit left earth and turned into the ibis, Georgina Williams pushed for the idea of the track, with several sites down the coast marked, "to provide a contemporary Kaurna presence within the physical public space of their own lands and in the public imagination".

In 2005, the City of Marion partnered with the City of Holdfast Bay, City of Onkaparinga and Yankalilla District Council to develop the Kaurna Tappa Iri Regional Agreement 2005-2008 (Walking Together), in which the Tjilbruki Dreaming Trail featured significantly. In 2006, six Kaurna interpretive signs were installed along the trail, in a collaboration with the state government. The markers have immense cultural and social significance for both Aboriginal and non-Aboriginal people, and help to bring Aboriginal cultural meaning to a wider audience.

Heading south from the Tjilbruke Monument at Kingston Park, there are ten markers, located at the following places:

- City of Marion:
  - 1 Hallett Cove/Karildilla, at a reserve on Weerab Drive
  - 2 Hallett Cove Karildilla, on Heron Way at the foreshore – site of the first spring
- City of Onkaparinga:
  - 3 Port Noarlunga/Tainbarilla – at Tutu Wirra Reserve – site of the second spring
  - 4 Red Ochre Cove/Karkungga – site of the third spring
  - 5 Port Willunga/Wirruwarrungga, Esplanade – site of the fourth spring
  - 6 Sellicks Beach/Witawodli, Esplanade/Francis Street – site of the fifth spring
- District Council of Yankalilla
  - 7 Carrickalinga Head/Karragarlangga, foreshore
  - 8 Wirrina Cove Resort/Kongaratinga, entrance forecourt – site of the sixth spring
  - 9 Rapid Bay/Patpangga, foreshore
  - 10 Cape Jervis/Parawerangk, lookout car park

In 2009, a walkway was created to provide better access to Tulukudangga Spring at Kingston Park, with new interpretative signage.

In the current City of Marion Reconciliation Plan, it is planned to "Collaborate with neighbouring Councils to promote the local Kaurna Tjilbruke Dreaming Tracks" in June 2022.

== The Tjilbruki Gateway (1997) ==
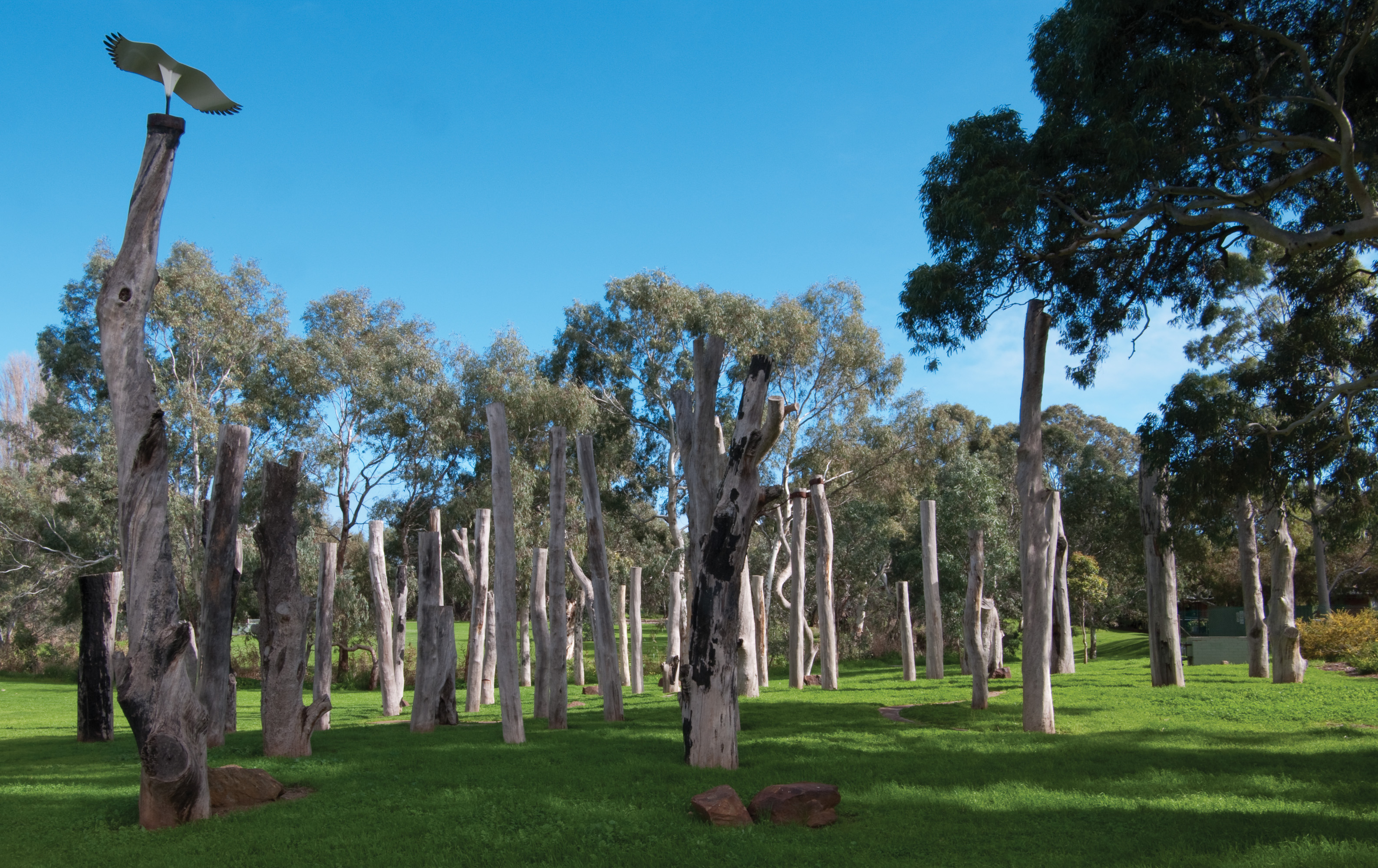
Tjilbruke narna arra, Tjilbruke Gateway, is a work by artists Sherry Rankine, Margaret Worth and Gavin Malone.

The Tjilbruki Gateway is a modern art installation installed by the City of Marion at Warriparinga ("windy place by the river"), developed by Adelaide artists Margaret Worth, Sherry Rankine and Gavin Malone. A complex and highly symbolic artwork, it incorporates coloured sands from the Red Ochre Cove area, morthi (tinder) made from stringybark tree trunks, and eucalypts. After being planned since 1995, official opening in October 1997 was attended by the Governor General of Australia, William Deane, Lowitja O'Donoghue, and several Kaurna representatives, and celebrated with traditional ceremony and dance.

== Warriparinga (2001) ==
A federal government-funded reconciliation project in partnership with the City of Marion and the Kaurna community (Dixon and Williams clans) worked together to create a visitor and education centre for Indigenous and non-Indigenous people to come together and reconcile their differences in the now metropolitan suburb of Marion, South Australia at a site known as site at Warriparinga. This site at Bedford Park within the grounds of Warriparinga wetland and Sturt River, a traditional ceremonial camp site for Kaurna people. Opened in 2001, it was named the Warriparinga Interpretive Centre, subsequently becoming the Living Kaurna Cultural Centre.

== Other public commemorations of Tjilbruke ==
The Tjilbruke Dreaming is referred to in eleven sites around Adelaide city centre. The first might be the ibis and Aboriginal man represented in the Three Rivers Fountain, sculpted by John Dowie and first unveiled in 1963 in Victoria Square/Tarndanyangga.

In 1972, John Dowie created a monument commemorating Tjilbruke. It was commissioned by the local newspaper, The Sunday Mail, in conjunction with the South Australia Museum.

There is a plaque at Mt Lofty Summit with information about Tjilbruke.

Designed by Kokatha artist Darryl Pfitzner "Mo" Milika, the outdoor art installation Yerrakartarta, meaning "at random" or "without design", was created with the assistance of several other artists including Kaurna/Ngarrindjeri artist Muriel van der Byl AM, (Note: Van der Byl's artwork was incorporated into the Australian fifty-dollar note released in 2018 (still current as of 2020).) ceramicists Jo Fraser, Stephen Bowers, and Jo Crawford from 1993 to 1994 on the forecourt of the Hyatt, now Intercontinental Hotel, on North Terrace in Adelaide. It was at the time "the largest Australian commission for an Aboriginal public artwork", and represents the history of the land through the forms of animals forms cut into the pavement, and, on the wall surrounding the area, a huge ceramic mural depicting the Tjillbruke Dreaming story.

Other commemorations include:

- 1990s: Tjilbruke Dreaming Mural, Brompton Primary School
- 1997: Cultural Path Signal Box Park, Rosewater
- 1998: Tjilbruke Dreaming Mural, O'Sullivan Beach Primary School
- 2006: Warriparinga Walk Mural, under the Southern Expressway bridge at Warriparinga, Bedford Park
- 2002: Kaurna meyunna, Kaurna yerta tampendi – "Recognising Kaurna people and Kaurna land", Adelaide Festival Centre, with a carved stone to represent the springs
- 2007: Towilla Yerta Reserve, Port Willunga – pavement pattern includes a tear shape, and there is interpretive signage referring to the Dreaming
- 2009: Glow / Taltaityai, Walter Morris Drive, Port Adelaide, with representations of ibis and emus
