= Minda Inc =

Australian disability support organisation

Minda
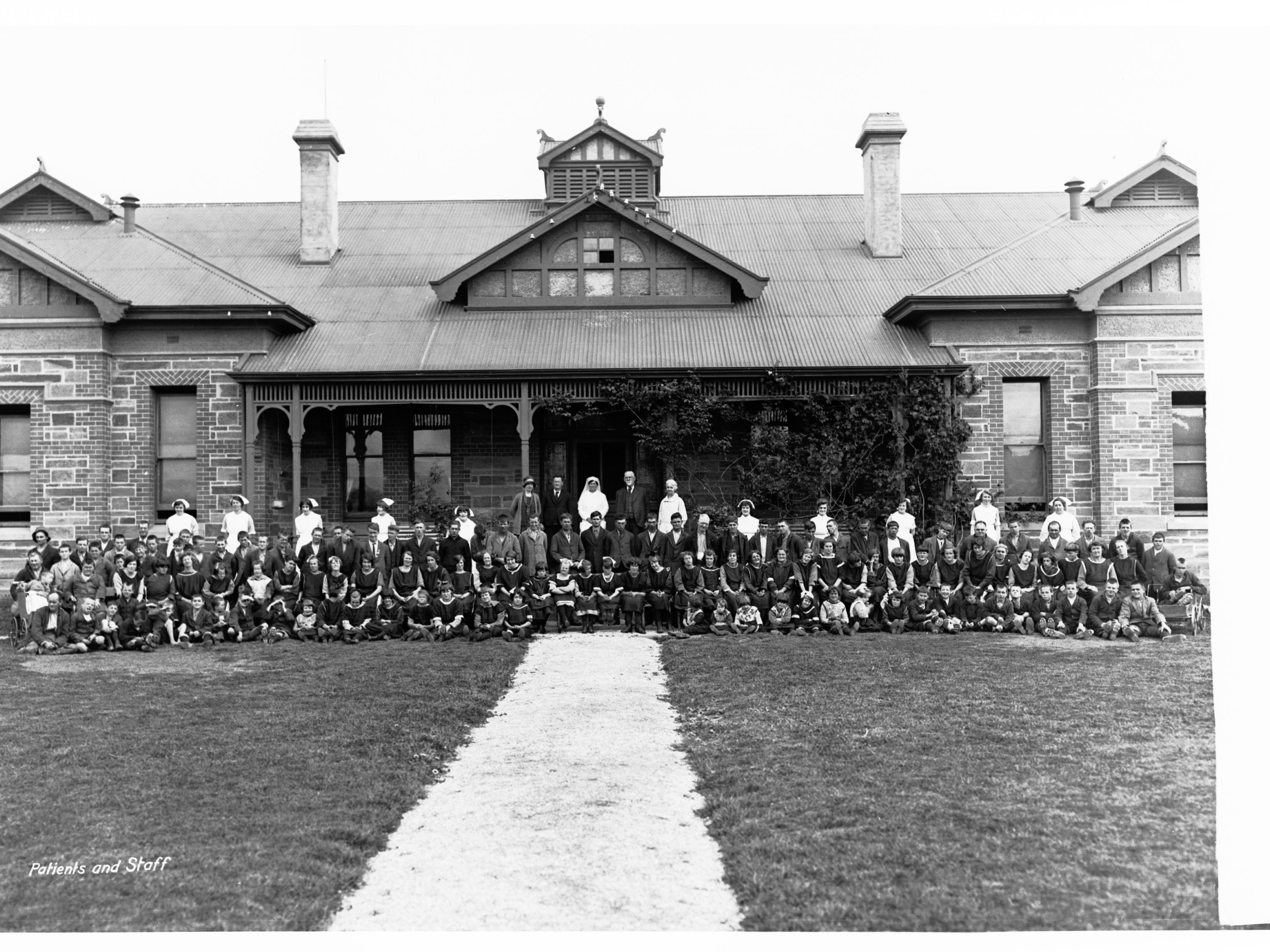
- Minda Home, patients and staff, 1927
- Formation: 1898; 128 years ago
- Founded: 1898
- Location: Brighton, South Australia, with a number of other sites
- Coordinates: 35.0045°S 138.5150°E
- Region served: South Australia
- Affiliations: National Disability Services
- Volunteers: 350 (2008–09)
- Website: http://www.minda.com.au

Minda (previously Minda Incorporated), established in 1898, provides support to children and adults with disability in Adelaide, South Australia and is the largest not-for-profit disability support organisation in the state.

The organisation offers support and opportunity to approximately 1,750 South Australians with disability in the areas of supported independent living (SIL) accommodation for both adults and children, lifestyle programs developing life skills and building friendships and communities, supported employment and respite. It is Minda's vision To be a leading force for good within Australia in supporting people living with an intellectual disability in all aspects of their lives.

Minda has office locations in the suburb of Brighton and Mount Gambier. The organisation was originally formed to provide support and lodging for children with intellectual disabilities.

== History ==
Prior to 1898, children with intellectual disabilities were housed along with adults in the lunatic asylum at Parkside. After lobbying by concerned citizens, notably George Ash M.P., the government promised £500 towards a better quality institution specifically for children, provided that a similar amount was raised from donations. This target was achieved and in 1897 a home was purchased on Fullarton Road, Fullarton. The home was registered as the Home for Weak Minded Children, but was called Minda, from a Kaurna word meaning 'place of shelter and protection'. The first children moved in during May 1898.

A larger property was bought at Brighton in 1909, and with further government support a new and larger home was erected. This was incorporated as Minda Home in September 1911. Further buildings and additions were built over the next two decades, and by 1934 Minda operated a farm and dormitory at Blackwood (now Craigburn Farm).

Despite Minda being established to provide a better environment for 'weak minded' children than Parkside Mental Hospital, Parkside continued to accommodate such children with several children being transferred from Minda to Parkside in 1940.

In 1980, 55 hectares of Craigburn Farm was donated for inclusion in Sturt Gorge Recreation Park as part of an agreement to allow subdivision of land south of the Sturt River in Flagstaff Hill. The major part of the balance of the farm at Blackwood was sold in the 1990s and forms the major part of Craigburn Farm, a major housing development. In 2007 the state government announced that the farm's dam would be included in an enlarged Sturt Gorge Recreation Park, building on the original donation and saving the dam from demolition.
