= Warriparinga =

Nature reserve in Adelaide, Australia

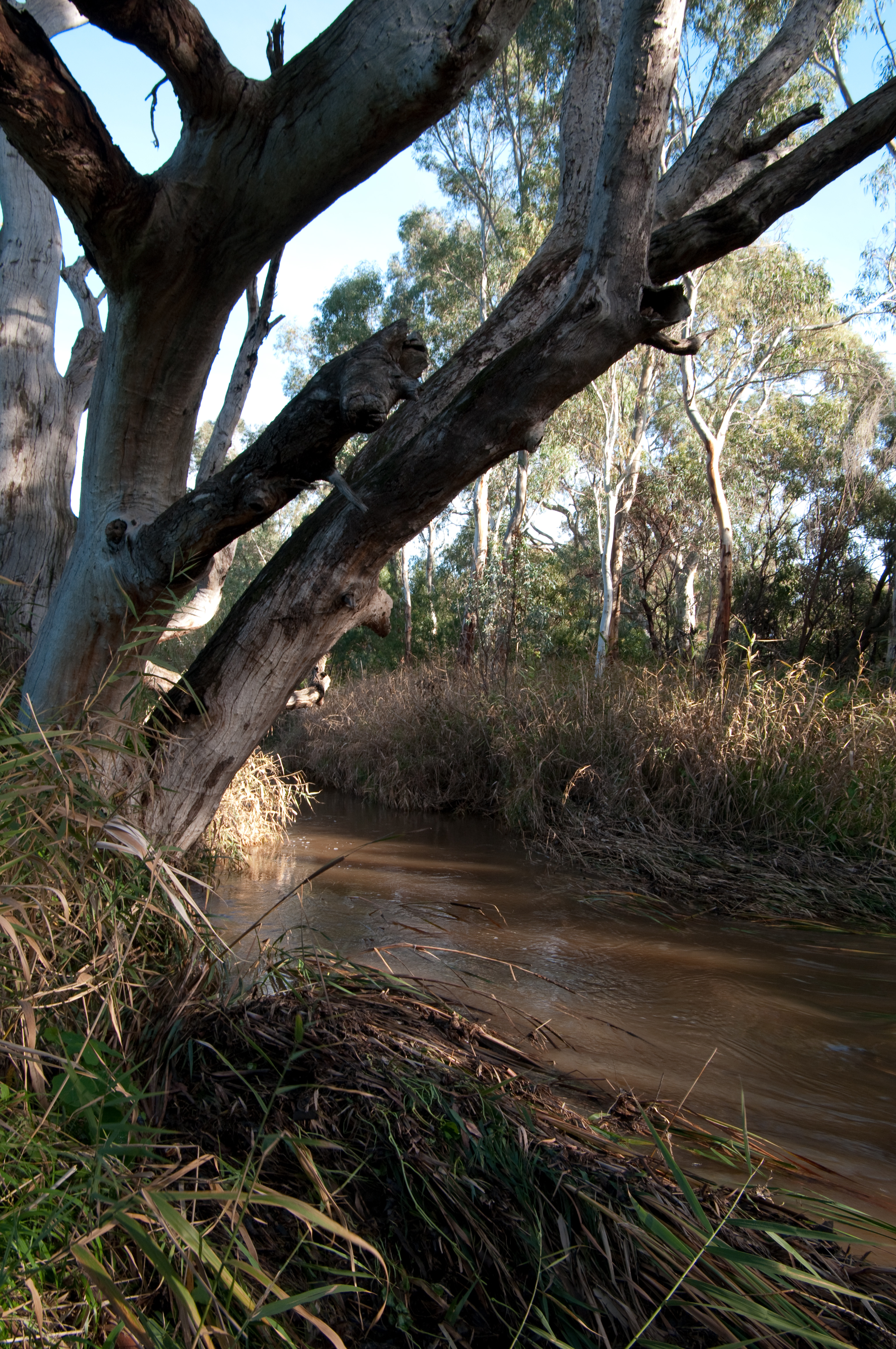
The Sturt River as it makes its way through Warriparinga.

Warriparinga, also spelt Warriparingga (meaning Windy Place in the local Kaurna language), is a nature reserve comprising 3.5 hectares (8.6 acres) in the metropolitan suburb of Bedford Park, in the southern suburbs of Adelaide, South Australia. Also known as Fairford, Laffer's Triangle, and the Sturt Triangle, Warriparinga is bordered by Marion Road, Sturt Road, and South Road, and is traversed by the Sturt River as it exists from Sturt Gorge to travel west across the Adelaide Plains.

It has historical, cultural and environmental significance as a traditional Kaurna ceremonial meeting place and as a site of early European settlement. Culturally, Warriparinga has particular significance to the Kaurna people through its association with the Tjilbruke Dreaming story and as the beginning of the Tjilbruke Trail. An interpretive museum, the Living Kaurna Cultural Centre is located on the site and recognises this tradition. The area also has historical significance as an early European settlement site, as it was settled in the 1840s soon after the establishment of South Australia. A heritage-listed farmhouse remains on the site, having remained essentially unchanged after modifications were made in the 1920s, and the land contains grape vines and fruit trees planted by the early settlers.

In 1998 the site was redeveloped as a native wetland. Stocked with native vegetation and fish, the wetland was designed to filter water from the Sturt River before it reached the Patawalonga River.

== Geography and location ==
Bounded by Sturt Road to the north, Marion Road to the west, and South Road to the south east, Warriparinga is part of a triangular section of land located in the southern Adelaide suburb of Bedford Park in the City of Marion. The site is traversed by the Sturt River which emerges from Sturt Gorge to enter Warriparinga as it starts to make its way along the Adelaide Plains, eventually joining the Patawalonga River. A portion of the Sturt River's flow is diverted on the site to form the Warriparinga Wetlands, while the river runs along a concrete drain once it leaves Warriparinga and continues in this vein until it joins the Patawalonga in Glenelg North.

== Pre-European settlement ==
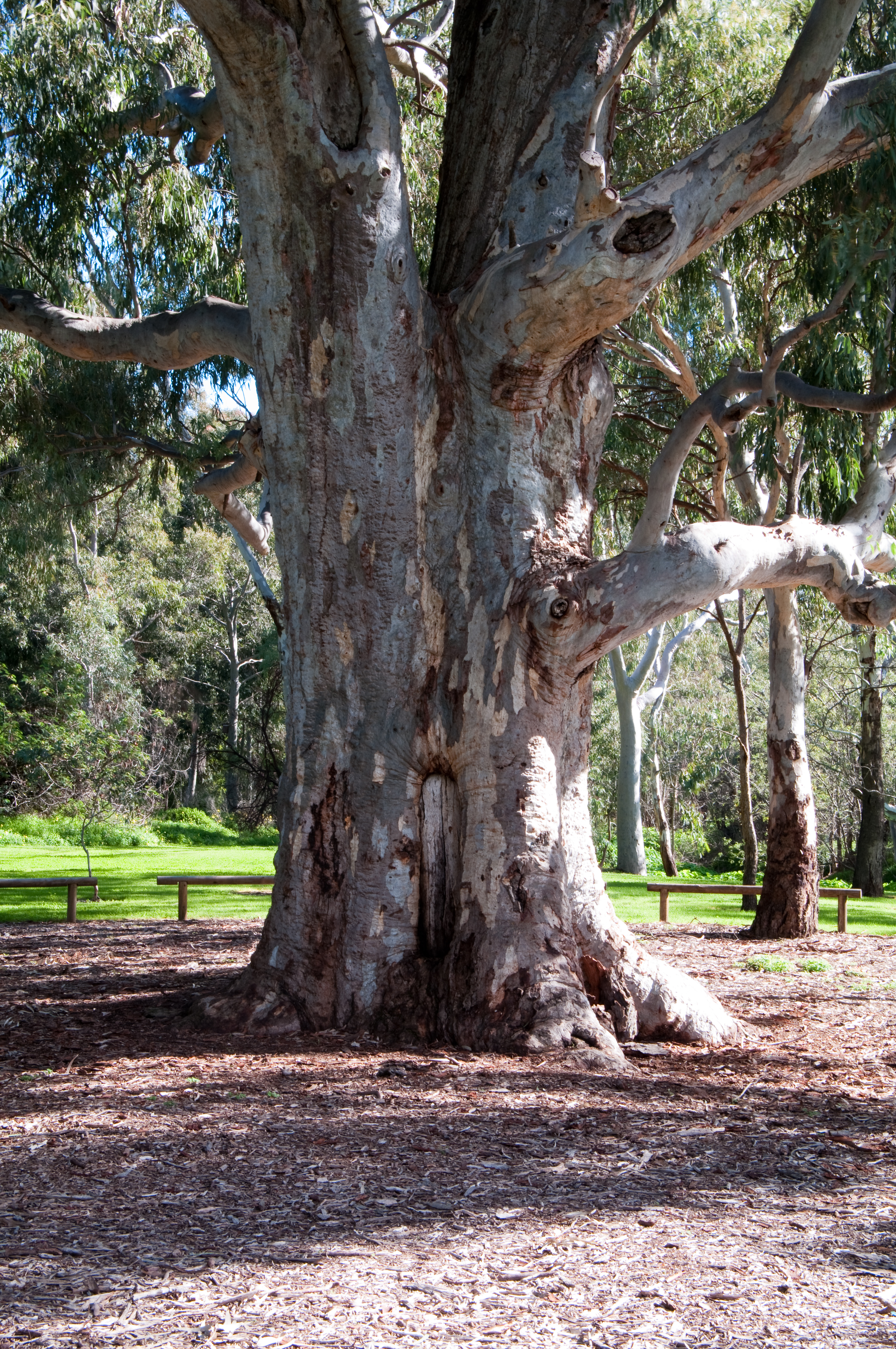
A scarred tree at Warriparinga. Bark was removed to produce a shield or tray.

Prior to European settlement, Warriparinga played a significant role in the traditions of the local Kaurna people – Warriparinga is the gateway to the Tjilbruke Dreaming, which relates the story of how many of the springs south of Adelaide were formed. Warriparinga was also a camping ground for the indigenous population, with kangaroos, emus and wallabies in the area, along with supplies of native food. Evidence of the traditional uses of the land includes a scarred tree, possibly used to make a shield or dish, and a number of scatter sites in the area where archaeologists have found aboriginal implements.

=== Tjilbruke Dreaming ===
In the Dreaming, Tjilbruke's nephew, Kulultuwi, joined Tjilbruke and his half brothers, Jurawi and Tetjawi, on a hunt. Tjilbruke became separated from his nephews as he followed the tracks of an emu, returning to discover that Kulultuwi had killed the emu that Tjilbruke had been hunting. This was against local law, as the emu now belonged to Tjilbruke. Kulultuwi apologised, and, accepting his apology, Tjilbruke continued on his journey.

With Tjilbruke gone, Kulultuwi was slain by his half brothers, on the grounds that Kulultuwi had broken the law by killing Tjilbruke's emu. They then bore his body to Warriparinga, where they intended to prepare it for burial. Tjilbruke came looking for Kulultuwi, and, determining that Kulultuwi had been murdered by his half brothers, killed Jurawi and Tetjawi at the site. Picking up his nephew's body, Tjilbruke carried him south to Patparno (Rapid Bay) for burial, resting at various locations along the path. Where he rested his tears created freshwater springs, and, after Kulultuwi was buried, Tjilbruke's body turned to iron pyrite as his grief led him to choose to give up life as a man. With the death of his body, his spirit transformed into a glossy ibis – a motif that is featured in many aspects of Warriparinga today.

== Post-European settlement ==
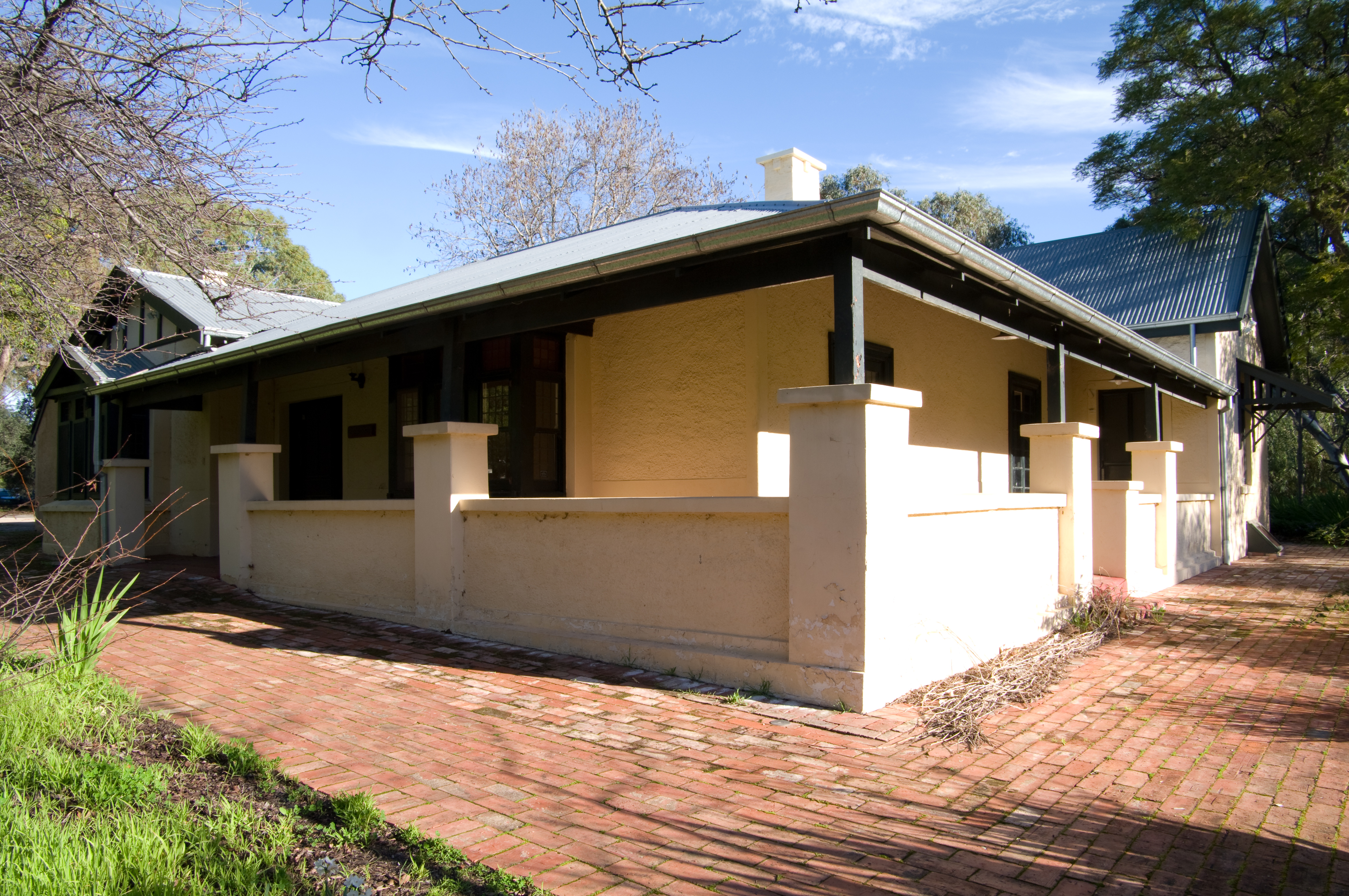
Fairford House at Warriparinga.

After the establishment of the City of Adelaide, the land was granted to George Fife Angas in 1839. Named after a local ford, "Fairford" consisted of land and a single-roomed cottage. In 1843 George Angas leased the site to William Henry Trimmer. Trimmer worked the land for many years, eventually purchasing the site from the South Australian Company in 1862 for the sum of £1,118.

Under Trimmer's custodianship, Fairford was developed to include over 13 acres (5.3 hectares) of vineyards – incorporating Gouais, Verdelho, Black Portugal and Grenache varieties – and various fruit trees. Trimmer became a respected viticulturist, eventually taking on the role of Treasurer for the South Australian Vinegrowers' Association, although his "addiction to his own vintage" was to result in health problems later in life. During this time the house was extended and a coach house was added to the property in the 1860s – it is suggested by Dolling that these improvements may have been designed by colonial architect, (and Lord Mayor), Edmund Wright.

Upon Trimmer's death in 1867, the property was passed to Trimmer's wife, Eliza Catherine Trimmer, and Edward Amand Wright, before being sold to Henry Laffer in 1876. Henry Laffer continued farming the land, although his son, Albert, chose to focus more on fruit trees than vineyards and grazing. The house was also modified during this period, with significant alterations occurring in the 1890s and again in 1923, at which point it took the form that it retains today – that of a 1920s bungalow.

The Laffer family remained on the property for 112 years, earning it the new name of "Laffer's Triangle".

=== Development ===
Over the years the property was considered for a number of projects, and parts of the land have been sold to various commercial and government interests. Warriparinga has been considered as the site for a number of major developments, such as the Marion Shopping Centre and Flinders Medical Centre – the latter moved because of concerns regarding a fault line that passes through the property, while the former was repositioned further west at the urging of both the investors and the Highways Department. Projects that did go ahead included a holiday park, a (now defunct) restaurant, call centres, a science park as part of the failed Multifunction Polis project, and the Sturt police station.

Three of the recent developments resulted in controversy. The first of these, the 1991 rebuilding of the South Road bridge over the Sturt River, led to the formation of the Friends of Laffer's Triangle when a local resident noticed the damage that the construction had caused to the local environment. Environmental issues came to the fore during the planning of the Southern Expressway, along with concerns that the work would destroy a significant archaeological site at Warriparinga. A similar combination of concerns resulted in changes to the Ansett Australia Call Centre after it was proposed in 2000, as both environmental and cultural issues led to a number of protests against its construction, although, like the other two projects, the call centre was eventually completed on the site.

=== Renaming ===
Paul and Naomi Dixon started lobbying the Marion Council to protect the site in 1992, calling for the development of a "Warriparinga Interpretive Centre". Warriparinga, meaning "windy river place", was derived from a number of Kaurna names and variant spellings that have been recorded for the site, including Warri Parri, Warriparri, Warreparinga and Walpari.

As a result, in the early 1990s, the Friends of Laffer's Triangle changed their name to Friends of Warriparinga. As the plans developed the name started to be applied to the entire project and, over time, the site as a whole. Eventually the name was formally accepted for the Warriparinga Reserve and the Warriparinga Wetlands, and today the name has almost entirely replaced the earlier terms.

== Warriparinga Wetlands ==
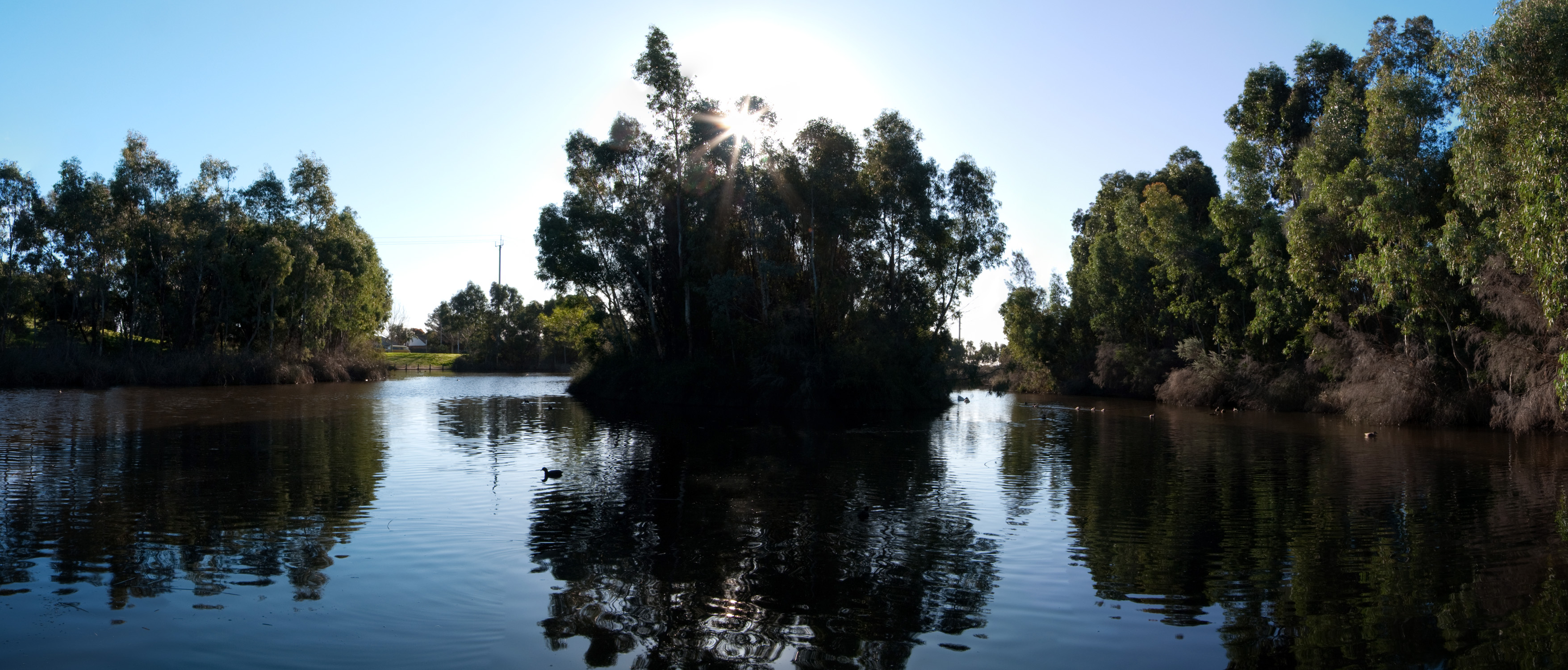
One of the small ponds that make up part of the wetlands.

The Warriparinga Wetlands was a combined project by the Marion Council, the Patawalonga Catchment Water Management Board and the Land Management Corporation, who provided the land that was required. Using a $1.7 million grant from the State Government, the wetlands were developed to filter water traveling along the Sturt River before it reached the Patawalonga.

While the overall design was conducted by B C Tonkin and Associates, the project involved a number of bodies, and, as no archaeological study had been previously undertaken on the site, one was organised. In addition, given the cultural significance of the site to the Kaurna people, representatives from the Kaurna Aboriginal Community and Heritage Association were included in the reference group.

The final design consists of four ponds that are fed by water diverted from the Sturt River using a strategically placed fallen log. Native vegetation has been planted around the area, and incorporates native food sources and plants that were employed by the indigenous population for their fiber. The ponds were stocked with a number of fish that were native to the area, including southern black bream (Acanthopagrus butcheri), bigheaded gudgeon (Philypnodon grandiceps), bridled goby (Arenigobius bifrenatus) and common galaxias (Galaxias maculatus).

Work started on the new wetlands in June, 1998, and was completed by December of that year. The wetlands were officially opened by John Olsen, the then Premier of South Australia, on 16 December 1998.

=== Awards ===
In 1999, a year after the wetlands were developed, the project was awarded a State CASE Earth Award. Created by the Civil Contractors Federation and Case Construction Equipment, the awards are intended to acknowledge environmental engineering within the civil engineering field. A second award came in 2000 when the wetlands were granted a commendation in the South Australian Engineering Excellence Awards, at which the judges noted the attention that the developers had paid to the sensitive issues that were involved, given the mix of cultural, residential and business concerns, along with the engineering principles and practices that were employed at the site.

== Living Kaurna Cultural Centre ==
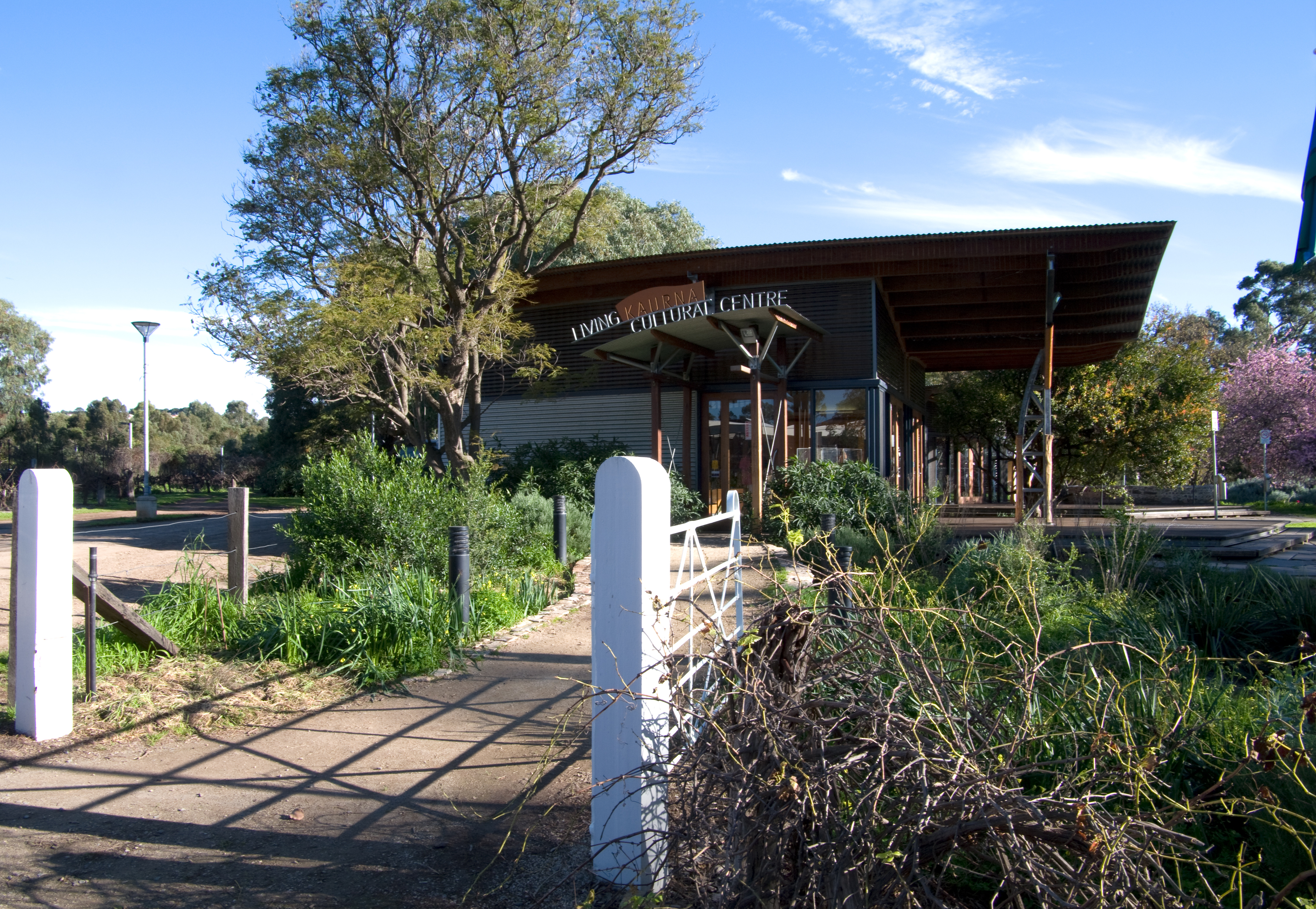
The entrance to the cultural centre.

First proposed in 1992 by Paul and Naomi Dixon, the Living Kaurna Cultural Centre (then known as the Warriparinga Interpretive Centre) was intended to educate visitors about the local Kaurna culture. After several years of discussion, in 1998 the Marion Council received funding for the project through a federal grant of $1.45 million via the Federation Cultural and Heritage Program.

Even with the funding now available, a number of setbacks occurred during development. Difficulties in finding compromise positions between stakeholders led the council to consider passing up the federal grant, and while that problem was overcome, there were ongoing concerns about where to locate the project. The original intent had been to build the cultural centre on the opposite side of Sturt River to Fairford house, but infrastructure costs and changes to the design of the wetlands prevented this from going ahead. Another site at Warriparinga was considered, but the construction of the Ansett Call Centre took precedence. The final location, next door to Fairford house, raised its own set of concerns, with suggestions that it would generate an architectural and cultural clash. Nevertheless, the plan won the support of the council and Heritage SA, and proceeded accordingly.

Work was completed on the Living Kaurna Cultural Centre by early September, 2002, and it was officially opened later that month by representatives of the Kaurna people, the Marion Council Mayor, and local federal parliamentarian, Andrew Southcott. The building was designed by Phillips/Pilkington Architects Pty Ltd and Habitable Places, and features a corrugated iron roof modeled to resemble the sweep of an ibis' wings, drawing a direction connection to the Tjilbruke Dreaming. The building incorporates an art gallery, a café, a retail area and a large stage, and the centre is used for education, cultural events, and retail sales of aboriginal and related produce.

== Art installations and cultural events ==
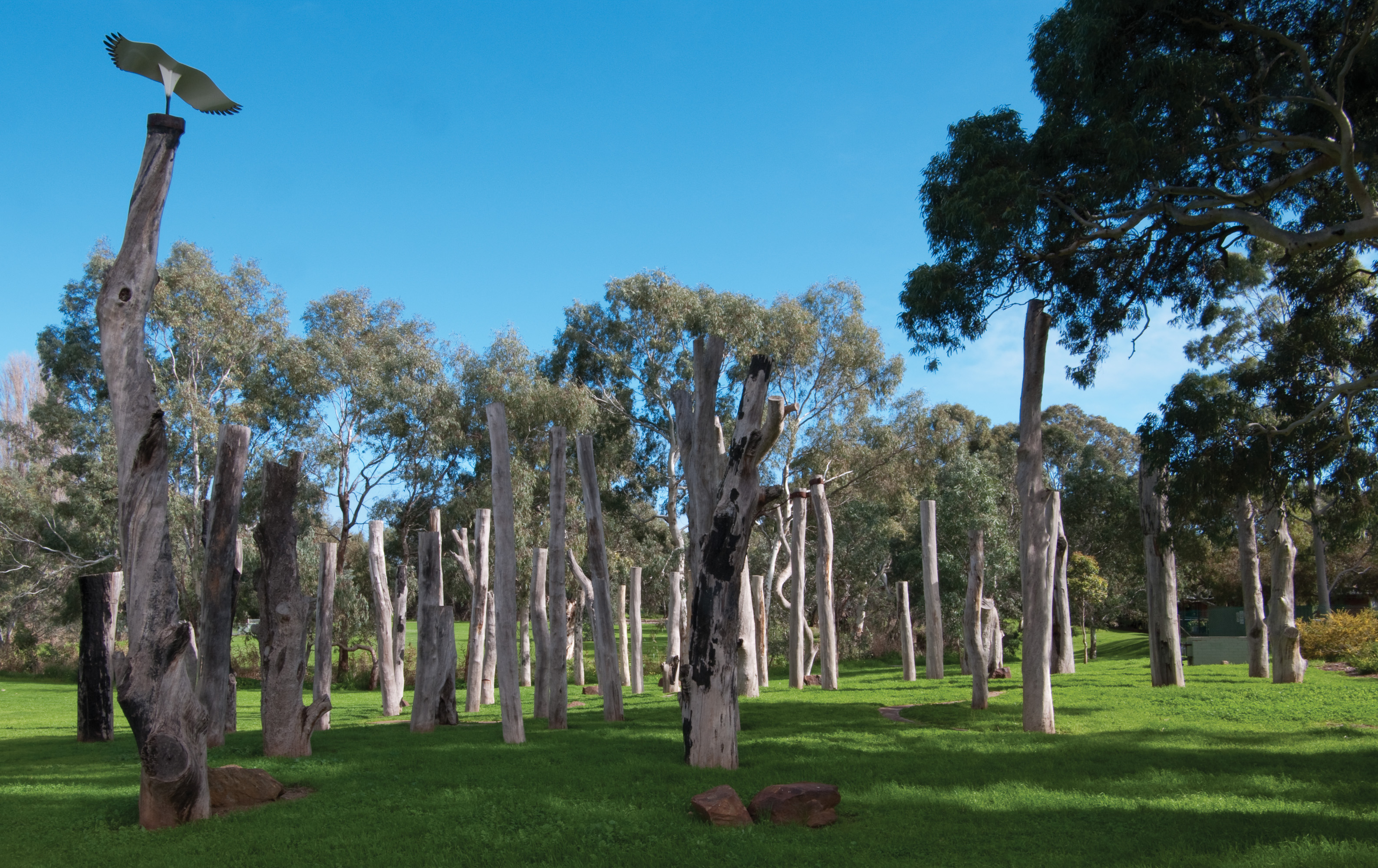
Tjilbruke narna arra, Tjilbruke Gateway by Sherry Rankine, Margaret Worth and Gavin Malone.

Located on the site is Tjilbruke narna arra, Tjilbruke Gateway, a representation of the Tjilbruke Dreaming by artists Sherry Rankine, Margaret Worth and Gavin Malone. Commissioned by the City of Marion, the work consists of a number of tree trunks clustered together, interwoven with symbolic representations of aspects from the Dreaming. Amongst these symbols are a number of circles around selected trunks, representing the freshwater springs that were created by Tjilbruke's tears; flows of coloured sands running through the work to represent the gully winds and the "flow of the river and of life"; and a representation of an ibis positioned above iron pyrite, symbolising Tjilbruke's final transformation. The work was intended, amongst other aims, to provide a space in which the Dreaming stories could be related by members of the Kaurna people.

Warriparinga has been the site of a number of significant cultural events in recent years. These include the "friendship fires" initiated in 1999 by Georgina Williams, which were lit at each full moon. The events brought together up to 150 people, and were used by members of the Kaurna people to help maintain a connection to the land. A similar fire was lit in May, 2004, and allowed to burn for several days as part of the National Reconciliation Week. The 2004 fire served as the centrepiece of a number of local celebrations and events during that period – including a farewell ceremony for outgoing Mayor, Colin Haines, and a protest against the building of the Ansett Call Centre close to the site. Other Reconciliation Week events held at Warriparinga include the 2009 launch of the first new bark canoe since European settlement. Built by Paul Dixon, the canoe was carved using traditional techniques from a tree found in nearby Mitchell Park.

== See also ==
- List of Adelaide parks and gardens
