= Sturt River =

River in Australia

Sturt Sturt Creek
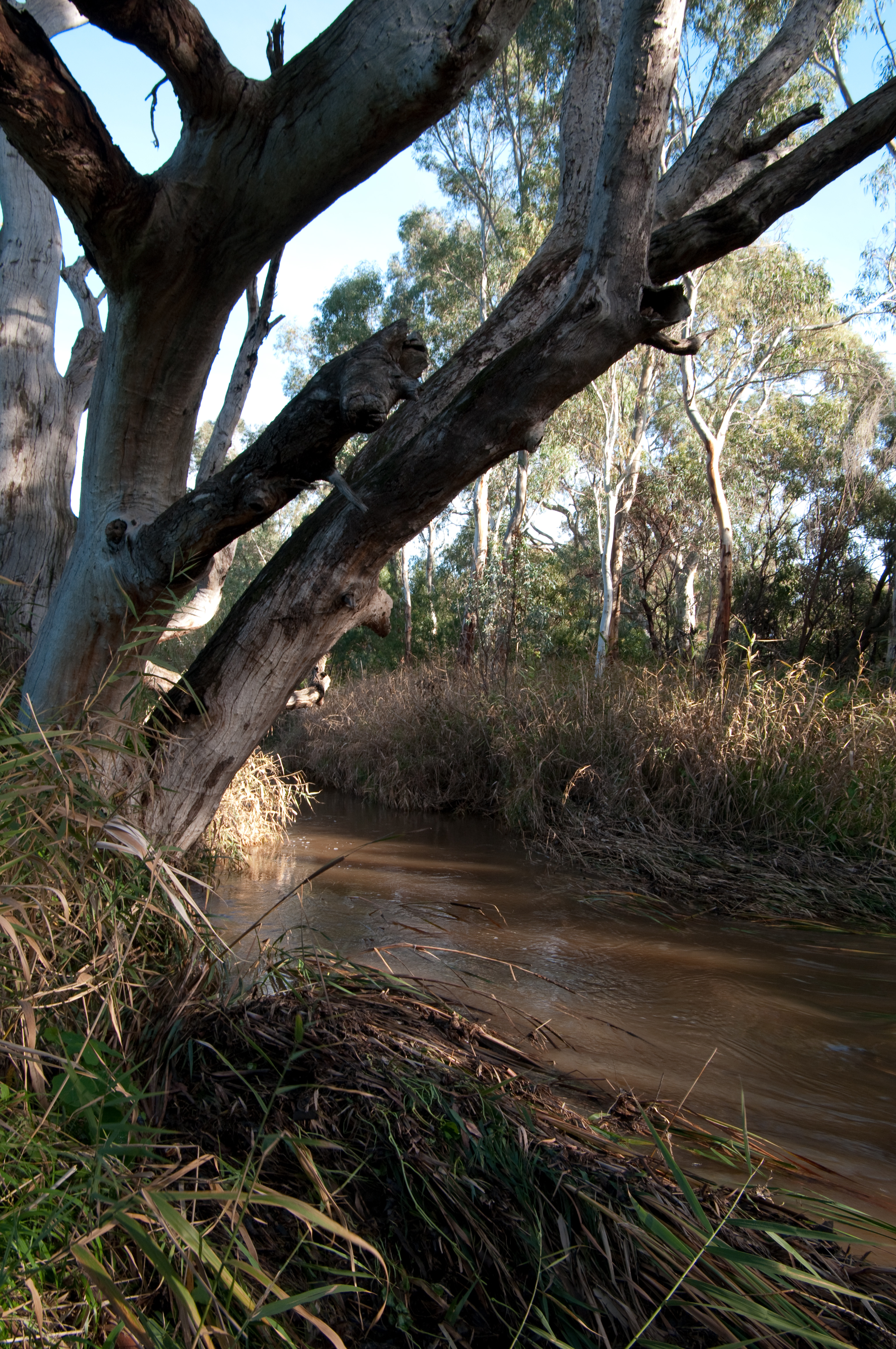
- The Sturt River in Warriparinga

- Location of the river mouth in South Australia
- Etymology: Charles Sturt
- Native name: Warri Parri (Kaurna)

Location
- Country: Australia
- State: South Australia
- Region: Adelaide

Physical characteristics
- Source: Adelaide Hills
  - location: Upper Sturt
  - elevation: 395 m (1,296 ft)
- Mouth: confluence with the Patawalonga River
  - location: Glenelg North
  - coordinates: 34°57′40″S 138°30′56″E
  - elevation: 0 m (0 ft)
- Length: 27 km (17 mi)
- Basin size: 120 km^{2} (46 sq mi)

Basin features
- Protected area: Sturt Gorge Recreation Park

The Sturt River, also known as the Sturt Creek and Warri Parri (Warriparri) in the Kaurna language, is a river in the Adelaide region of the Australian state of South Australia.

== Course and features ==
The Sturt River rises in Upper Sturt in the Adelaide Hills, it flows through Coromandel Valley, the Sturt Gorge Recreation Park, Marion and Morphettville, before meeting the Patawalonga River in Glenelg North. Along with Brown Hill Creek, it is one of the Patawalonga's most important tributaries. It is considered a significant urban waterway, and was used by the indigenous Kaurna people as a link between the hills and the sea. The Sturt River catchment area extends over 120 square kilometres (46 sq mi), from Heathfield in the Mount Lofty Ranges, to Glenelg North. The river descends 395 metres (1,296 ft) over its 27-kilometre (17 mi) course.

== History ==
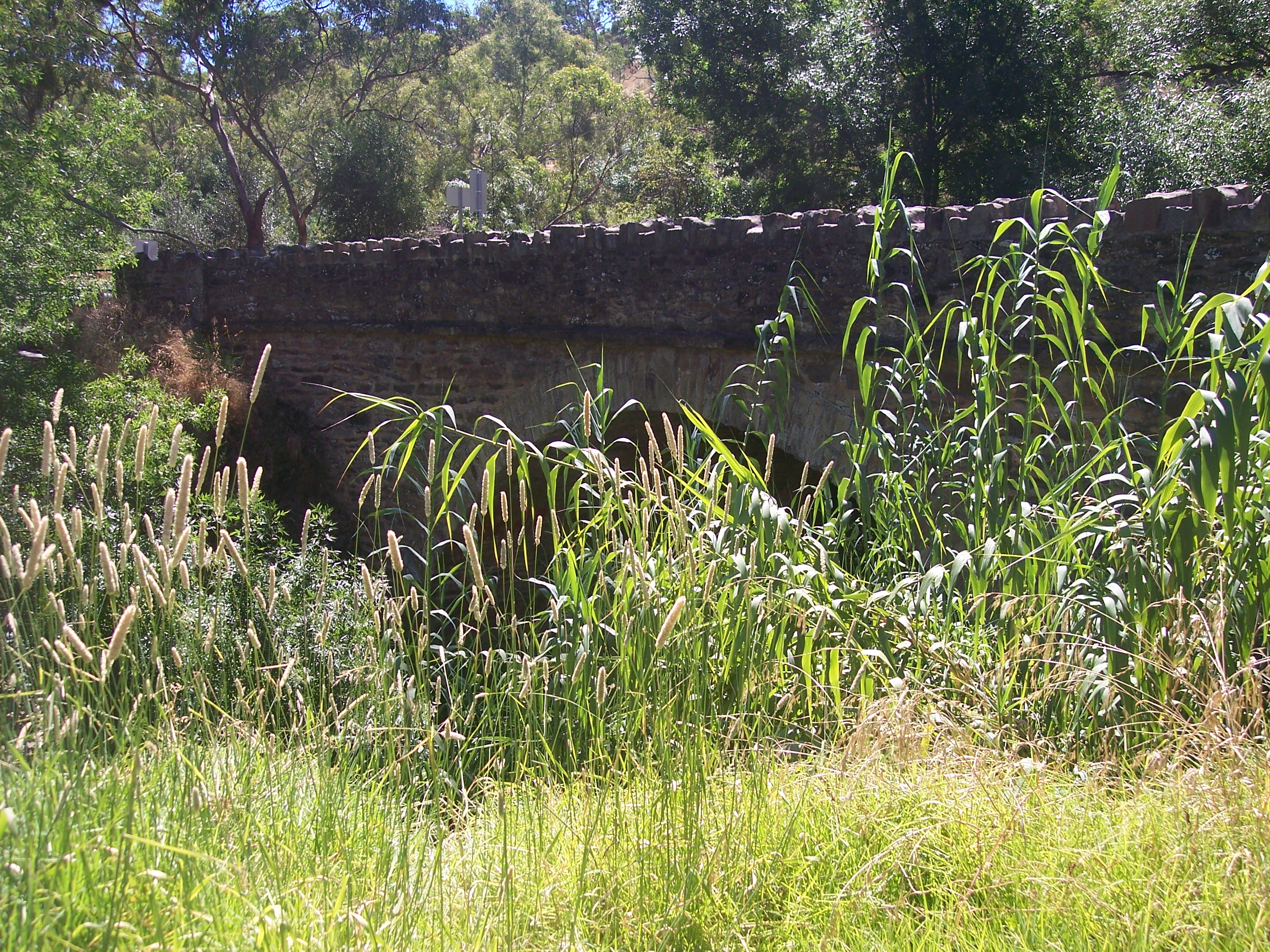
Horner's Bridge, the first bridge to be constructed over the river in 1866, (photo taken 2007).

The first inhabitants of the greater Adelaide area, the Kaurna people, referred to Sturt River as Warri Parri, or 'the windy place by the river'. They used it as a movement corridor between the Adelaide Hills and the sea. The river is also significant in Kaurna Dreaming, especially the area known as Warriparinga, where the river leaves its gorge to cross the Adelaide Plains. Other important Kaurna campsites were located south of the Sturt-Patawalonga confluence, and at Chambers Gully in Coromandel Valley.

In April 1831, Captain Collet Barker a British Military Officer named the river after fellow officer and the explorer Charles Sturt.

In the early days of British settlement, the new colony appointed Colonel William Light as Surveyor General; one of his tasks was to find a suitable location for the colony's capital. Light's first rough sketch, made in 1836, placed the city on the Sturt River, where the suburb of Marion is now located. He later changed his plans to locate the city on the River Torrens instead.

The river is lined with many buildings of historic and cultural value, especially in the Coromandel Valley and Craigburn Farm areas, which mostly date back to the 1850s. The first bridge to be built over the river is Horner's Bridge, constructed in 1866 in Coromandel Valley.

In 1879, flood mitigation works were carried out to prevent damage to properties in Glenelg, and to the Morphettville Racecourse. A trapezoidal concrete channel was constructed to line the river from Sturt Road to the Patawalonga Basin in 1965. A flood control dam was also constructed in 1965, in the part of the Sturt Gorge Recreation Park which falls in Flagstaff Hill.

== Present day ==
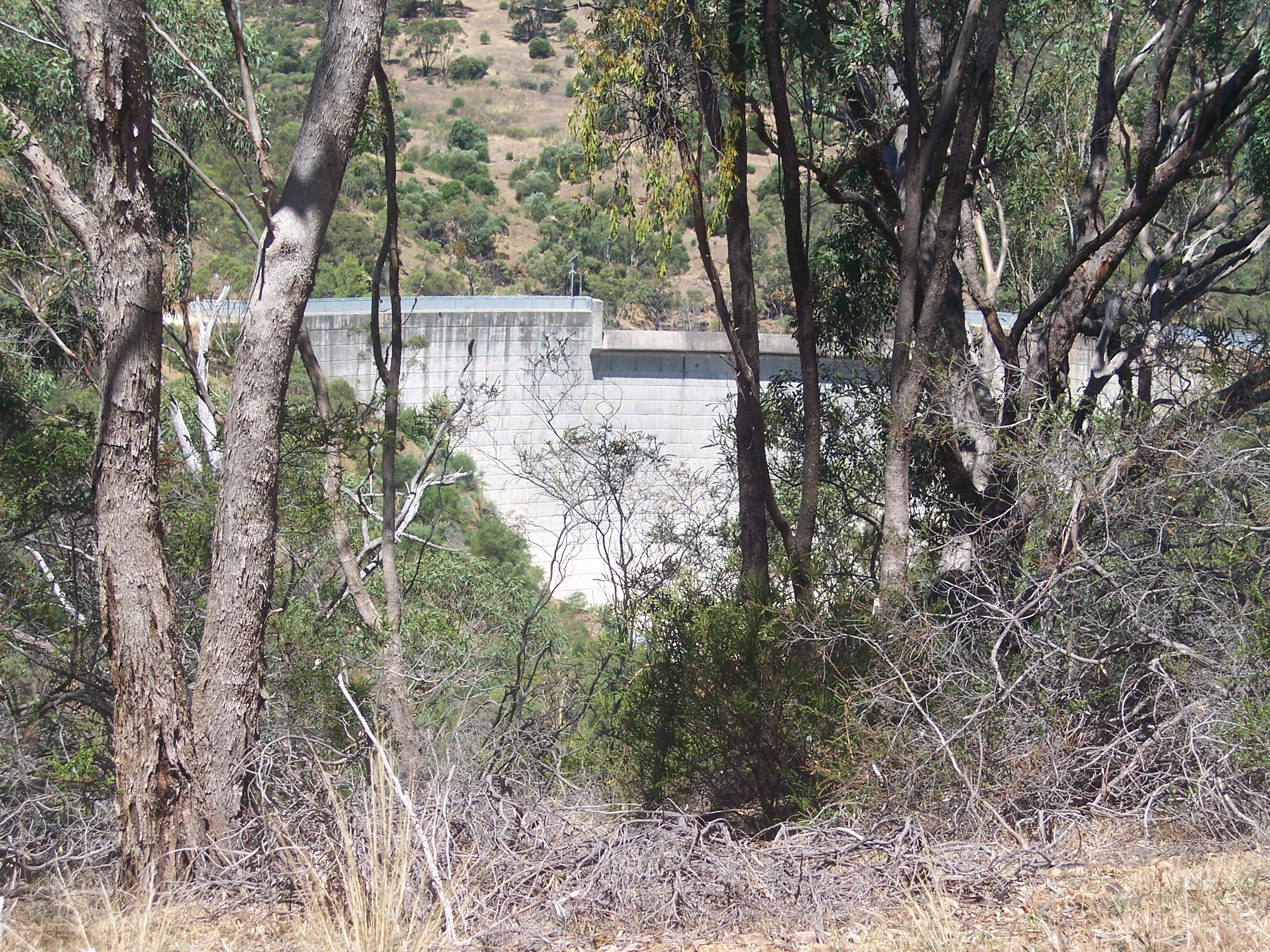
Flood control dam over the river in Flagstaff Hill, in 2007.

The river begins in Upper Sturt, continuing through the semi-rural suburbs of Ironbank and Coromandel East. Due to steep terrain and dense vegetation, the river is largely inaccessible in this section. It then flows through the residential suburbs of Coromandel Valley and Craigburn Farm, before reaching the Sturt Gorge Recreation Park, which extends along the suburbs of Craigburn Farm, Flagstaff Hill and Bellevue Heights. It leaves the gorge and continues along the Adelaide Plains at South Road, through urban and residential settings. It forms the northern boundary to the City of Onkaparinga with the City of Mitcham.

Due to urbanisation and agriculture, the Sturt River has suffered a degradation in water quality, biodiversity and visual and recreational value. In 2005, the Patawalonga Catchment Water Management Board, part of the Adelaide and Mount Lofty Ranges Natural Resources Management Board, commenced the development of the Sturt River Linear Park Master Plan. This plan involves the establishment of a continuous open public space along the river, between Glenelg North and Coromandel Valley, and improving the environmental condition of the river. The plan also includes the possibility of forming connections between the proposed Linear Park and Belair National Park, via Minno Creek.

Waterwatch Adelaide, a government organisation which involves primary school children in the monitoring of water, considers the water quality of the river to be "generally good", with low salinity, turbidity, phosphorus and nitrogen levels, and a medium pH.

=== Shared path ===
A sealed pedestrian and bicycle path runs along the Sturt River between the Southern Expressway and Glenelg, linking at its Southern end to the Adelaide Southern Veloway which, with the Coast to Vines rail trail, provides an almost non-stop bicycle route between Glenelg and Willunga.

== See also ==
- List of rivers of Australia § South Australia
