= Coromandel Valley, South Australia =

Coromandel Valley
- Suburb
- Coordinates: 35°02′42″S 138°37′26″E
- Country: Australia
- State: South Australia
- Region: Southern Adelaide
- City: Adelaide
- LGAs: City of Mitcham; City of Onkaparinga
- Location: 16.5 km (10.3 mi) from Adelaide

Government
  - State electorate: Waite
  - Federal division: Mayo

Population
  - Total: 4,380 (SAL 2021)
- Postcode: 5051
- County: Adelaide
Suburbs around Coromandel Valley
Craigburn Farm	Blackwood	Hawthorndene
Craigburn Farm; Flagstaff Hill	Coromandel Valley	Coromandel East
Flagstaff Hill	Aberfoyle Park	Cherry Gardens; Chandlers Hill

Coromandel Valley, referred to locally as Coro, is a semirural south-eastern suburb of Adelaide, South Australia. It straddles the City of Mitcham and the City of Onkaparinga council areas, with the Sturt River being the boundary between the two.

== History ==
Coromandel Valley, and its neighbouring suburb, Coromandel East, gain their name from a ship, the Coromandel, which arrived in Holdfast Bay from London in 1837 with 156 English settlers. The ship was in turn named after the Coromandel Coast in India. After the ship reached the shore, on 17 January 1837 some of its sailors deserted, intending to remain behind in South Australia, and took refuge in the hills in the Coromandel Valley region. Appearing after the ship had sailed, they were never prosecuted, owing to the lack of a suitable official.

The Coromandel Valley Primary School, established in 1877 with an enrolment of 74, is one of the oldest in South Australia. Adjacent to the school is the original St John's Anglican Church, built with local stone. The parish at various times in the last century included the rural areas from Meadows in the South to Belair in the north. An important business in the early days was Alex Murray & Son's jam and biscuit factory, which closed around 1902.

The (now closed) Coromandel Valley Post Office first opened on 10 July 1850, for a time designated "West Sturt".

== Sporting clubs ==
=== Cricket ===
The Coromandel Valley Ramblers Cricket Club (CVRCC) is a cricket club based in Coromandel Valley, South Australia. Cricket in the area dates back to 1862 with the original Coromandel Cricket Club. When that club drifted toward the Blackwood district, locals formed the Riverside Cricket Club in 1906, though it disbanded in 1914 due to World War I.

The Ramblers were formally established in 1926, drawing from former Riverside players. They shared Hawthorndene Oval with the Blackwood RSL Club. In the 1946–47 season, they joined the Adelaide and Suburban Cricket Association. A premiership in 1969–70 in Section 2 saw the A Grade promoted to Section 1, where it has remained since. The club fields multiple sides across different grades.

In recent years the club has enjoyed a dominant run, winning the 2025/26 Section 1 premiership; their fourth title in the last five seasons.

They compete in South Australian suburban cricket and are based at grounds in the Coromandel Valley / Hawthorndene area.

=== Croquet ===
The Coromandel Valley Croquet Club was established in 1926 and is based at the Weymouth Recreation Grounds, Coromandel Community Centre. The club went into abeyance in the 1950s and was revived in 1959.

=== Tennis ===
The Coromandel Valley Tennis Club at the Weymouth Recreation Grounds, Coromandel Community Centre was established in 1909.

== Parks and recreation ==
- Frank Smith Park, a reserve of approximately 12 hectares including a wetland
- Sturt River Linear Park
- Weymouth Oval Recreation Ground

== Notable figures ==
- Alexander Murray (1803–1880) and Alexander Murray Jr. (1832-1914), early industrialists who established the ''Craiglee'' estate in 1844. They founded the Murray & Son biscuit and jam factory, which became South Australia's first biscuit manufacturer and a primary employer in the valley during the 19th century. Their historic home, Craiglee House, remains a local landmark on Coromandel Parade in Coromandel Valley.
- Enoch Shepley (1828–1909), an early settler who arrived to Coromandel Valley in the 1850s, occupied land near the river ford and build a two-story house, a general store, and the local post office around 1860.
- Henry Langsford (1849–1918), son-in-law to Enoch Shepley (see above), he constructed the iconic Winns Bakehouse in 1878 directly opposite the Shepley house. The building is now the Winns Bakehouse Museum, managed by the National Trust.
- John Carr (1871–1929), a prominent South Australian politician and a resident of Coromandel Valley. Carrs Bridge, which spans across the Sturt River, was constructed in 1872 and named in his honor.
- Penny Wong (1968–), Australian politician and former Minister for Foreign Affairs who attended Coromandel Valley Primary School for her primary education.
