= Keswick Creek =

- Location within South Australia

Location
- Country: Australia
- State: South Australia
- Region: Metropolitan Adelaide
- Suburb: Wayville

Physical characteristics
- Source: Confluence of South Parklands Creek and Glen Osmond Creek
  - location: Wayville
  - coordinates: 34.9476°S 138.5970°E
- Mouth: Patawalonga River
  - location: Glenelg North
  - coordinates: 34.9615°S 138.5161°E

Basin features
- River system: Patawalonga River
- Tributaries
  - left: Brown Hill Creek

Keswick Creek and Glen Osmond Creek together form a watercourse flowing through the inner south-eastern, south-western and western suburbs of the Adelaide metropolitan area, in the Australian state of South Australia. The watercourse is part of the Patawalonga River catchment.

The water course has been extensively altered since European settlement to manage stormwater flows and avoid flooding in the heavily populated urban areas through which it passes.

== Course and features ==
The source of Glen Osmond Creek is in the south-eastern suburb of Glen Osmond, abutting the Adelaide Hills. Its original course through Myrtle Bank, Fullarton and Unley is obscured due to the construction of drains along the original creek line.

A second stream known as Parklands Creek flows through the southern Adelaide Parklands and once ran roughly parallel to the Glen Osmond from an adjacent source in the hillside suburb. Following extensive drainage works in the south-eastern suburbs it is only now visible in the parklands, draining from the south-easterly adjacent suburb of Glenside. These two streams originally from Glen Osmond join at Wayville.

Downstream from Wayville the watercourse is known as Keswick Creek. From there flows are typically directed via a constructed drain through the inner western suburbs of Keswick, Mile End South, Richmond, Cowandilla, West Richmond and Brooklyn Park before draining along the eastern edge of Adelaide Airport to join Brown Hill Creek near Netley and ultimately the sea via drains to the Patawalonga River. To manage stormwater volumes the flows may alternatively be diverted into Brown Hill Creek earlier at the inner south suburb of Forestville, at which point Brown Hill Creek also takes the form of a constructed drain.

State government records state that, as with Glen Osmond Creek, the full downstream extent of the original Keswick Creek watercourse is unknown due to the construction of drains along the creek line.

== See also ==
- List of rivers of Australia § South Australia
