= Bedford Park, South Australia =

Bedford Park
- Suburb
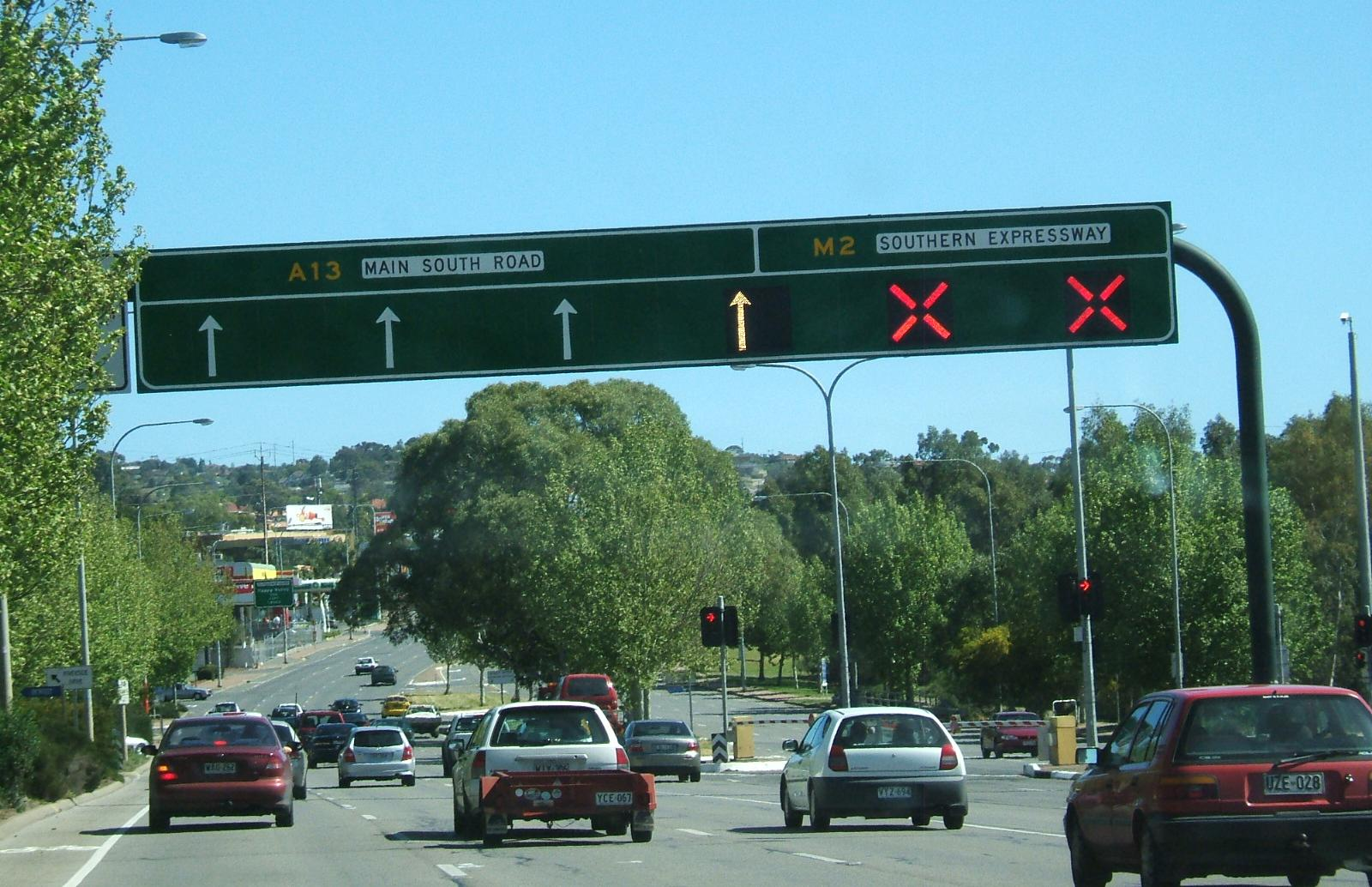
- Southern Expressway entrance at Bedford Park, before it was made into a two way road

- Coordinates: 35.021°S 138.568°E
- Country: Australia
- State: South Australia
- City: Adelaide
- LGAs: City of Mitcham; City of Marion
- Location: 10 km (6.2 mi) from City-centre

Government
  - State electorate: Davenport
  - Federal division: Boothby

Population
  - Total: 1,882 (SAL 2021)
- Postcode: 5042
Suburbs around Bedford Park
Mitchell Park	Clovelly Park	St Marys
Sturt	Bedford Park	Eden Hills
Darlington	Flagstaff Hill	Bellevue Heights

Bedford Park is a southern suburb of Adelaide in South Australia.

Bedford Park is the home of Flinders University and the Flinders Medical Centre. The greater part of the suburb lies within the City of Mitcham, but the north west corner lies within the City of Marion where the Warriparinga wetlands and Living Kaurna Cultural Centre are located beside the Sturt River.

The suburb is in the state electorate of Davenport. It is in the federal Division of Boothby.

== History ==
The first part of Bedford Park was established in 1839 when 80 acres situated on River Sturt (Section No 81) was made available for sale. William H Trimmer settled on 'Fairford' on the west side of South Road and his brother Edmund I Trimmer settled on the east side of South Road. Mitcham Council first assessed the property in 1853 and included 10 acres of this in Sections 63 to 67. A house was in existence on Section 63. By 1882 the property valued at £3,700 was occupied by Luke Franklin. For a brief period between 1912 and 1915 the property was owned by Ella A Hancock, daughter-in-law to Captain Hancock, Moonta's mine manager.

The northern section between South, Sturt and Shepherds Hill Roads was known as Burbank, after Luther Burbank, a prominent American horticulturist. in the middle of the area was a dam to irrigate the almond trees grown in the area. In 1965 the name of the area known as Burbank was changed to Bedford Park.

The Hancock family established a homestead and farm at the foot of the Adelaide Hills. A family name from an earlier generation lent its name to the property of Bedford which was later changed to Bedford Park. In 1917, 400 acres (1.6 km^{2}) of the property was purchased by the South Australian Government and the Bedford Park Sanatorium, a tuberculosis sanatorium, was built. Initially housing World War I soldiers the sanatorium was expanded until, by 1924, it had 74 beds and was a self-supporting farm with pigs, chickens, orchards and grain production. The sanatorium was demolished and Flinders University built in its place in the 1960s. The university was opened in 1966. Flinders Medical Centre, a public hospital and teaching school co-located with the university, opened in 1976.

Bedford Park Sanatorium

Burbank Post Office opened on 26 September 1961 and was renamed Bedford Park Post Office in 1966, before closing in 1980.

== Population ==
In the 2021 Census, there were 2,850 people in Bedford Park. 46.2% of people were born in Australia. The next most common countries of birth were China (6.7%) and Indonesia (5.5%). 50.4% of people only spoke English at home. Other languages spoken at home included Mandarin (10.6%) and Indonesian (5.6%). The most common responses for religion were No Religion 38.1%, Catholic 15.1% and Islam 8.6%.
