= Patawalonga River =

River in Australia

Patawalonga Patawalonga Creek
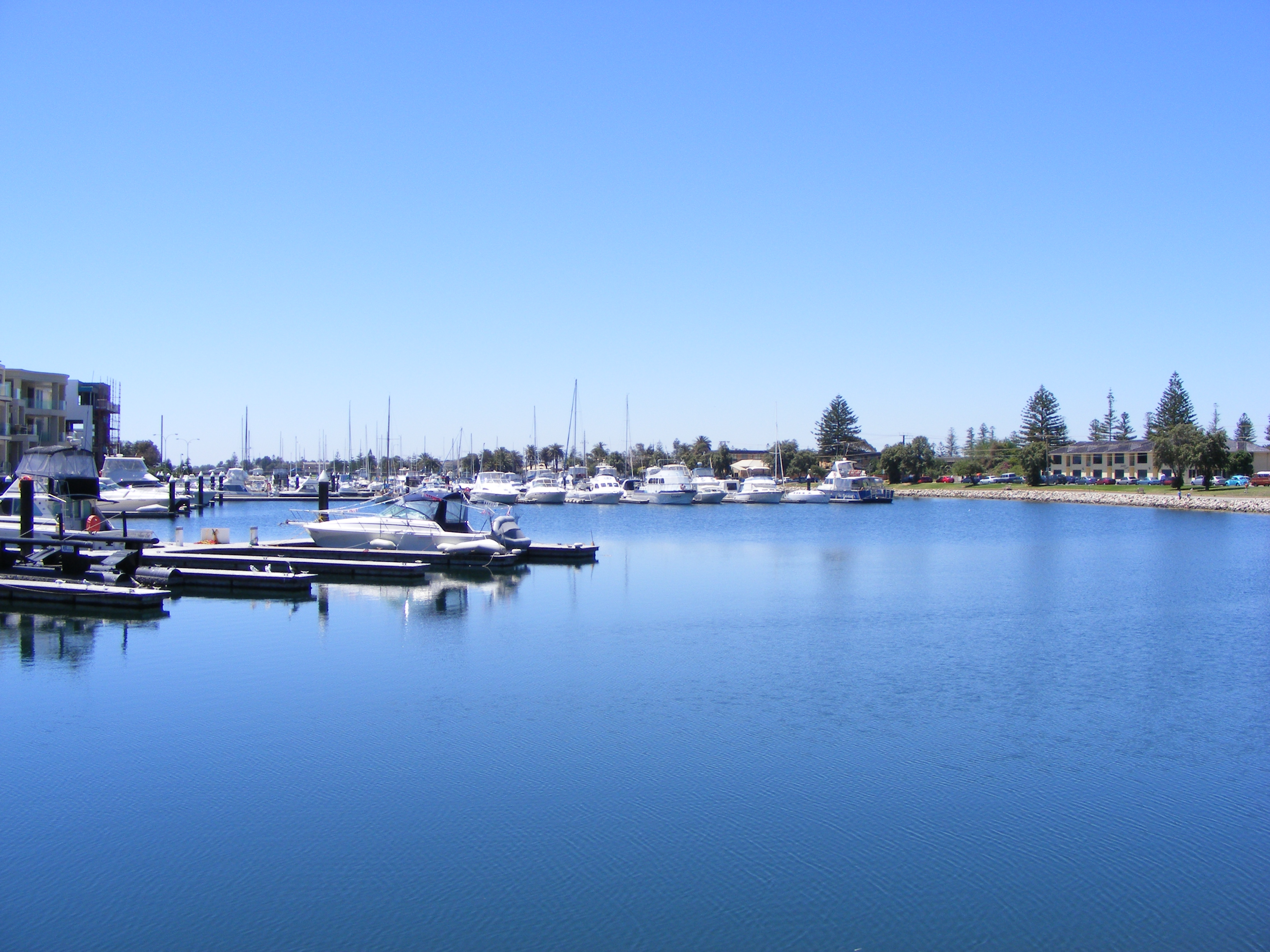
- The Patawalonga River near its mouth

- Location of the river mouth in South Australia
- Nickname: The Pat

Location
- Country: Australia
- State: South Australia
- Region: Metropolitan Adelaide
- District: Cowandilla Plains
- Towns: Glenelg

Physical characteristics
- Source
  - location: near Adelaide Airport
- Mouth: Gulf St Vincent
  - location: Glenelg North
  - coordinates: 34°58′12″S 138°30′49″E
  - elevation: 0 m (0 ft)
- Length: 7 km (4.3 mi)
- Basin size: 210 km^{2} (81 sq mi)

The Patawalonga River (English: /ˈpætəwəˌlʌŋgə/), also known as the Patawalonga Creek, is a river in the western suburbs of the Adelaide metropolitan area, in South Australia. It drains an area of flat, swampy lands formerly known as the Cowandilla Plains or as The Reedbeds, that were drained by the engineering works in the mid-20th century, to enable establishment of Adelaide Airport and development of residential housing.

The Patawalonga River catchment area is in the western Adelaide Hills, and it drains into Gulf St Vincent south of Glenelg. Its name is derived from the Kaurna language, meaning "the place of the swamp gum".

The Barcoo Outlet was completed in 2001 to divert dirty stormwater from the river mouth out to sea, creating a small lake or lagoon at the river mouth. This outlet was controversial due to failures to handle heavy rainfall, which resulted in instances of pollution entering the lake section of the Patawalonga, and minor flooding that damaged homes in Glenelg North and Novar Gardens.

== Course and features ==
The Patawalonga River, sometimes called Patawalonga Creek, and known to local residents as the Pat, is a short river of roughly 7 kilometres (4.3 mi) in length that was, before European settlement, a tidal estuary. The river drains a 210-square-kilometre (81 sq mi) catchment area of metropolitan Adelaide, south of the River Torrens catchment, and the western side of the Adelaide Hills escarpment.

The Patawalonga serves as an outlet for the Keswick and Brownhill creeks and the Sturt River (also known as Sturt Creek), the latter being a former natural creek comprising for a significant part of its length now as a large concrete storm-drain. It drains an area of flat, swampy lands formerly known as the Cowandilla Plains. The catchment includes the Cowandilla-Mile End drainage network, the construction of which has replaced numerous small natural watercourses and swamp lands south of the Torrens River watershed. This area includes the suburb of Brooklyn Park and the southern parts of Torrensville, Underdale and Lockleys as well as Cowandilla, Mile End and Adelaide Airport.

Construction of Adelaide Airport from the late 1940s to 1954 included the present-day Cowandilla-Mile End Drain on the north boundary of the airport. It is called Airport Drain as it passes along the western edge of the airport and enters the Patawalonga at multiple points in the suburb of West Beach. Part of the Patawalonga Creek is on land reserved for future development of a third runway.

The catchment also includes the Warriparinga Wetlands, opened 16 December 1998, an artificial wetlands situated near the suburb of Marion designed to filter stormwater before it flows through the Sturt River to the Patawalonga.

Its mouth is in the suburb of Glenelg. River flow at the mouth is regulated by barrages at Glenelg North and then flows past the Holdfast Shores marina development.

=== Damming ===
Thomas King MP was the first to advocate damming the Patawalonga and he introduced a Bill in 1876 into the State Parliament to enable the Corporation of Glenelg to construct such a dam. Damming was seen as a means of reducing or removing the odour from the estuary of the river, and also enabled the Patawalonga to be navigable and thus a safe harbour for yachts and other recreational watercraft. The dam was constructed in around 1885.

King's service to his community is commemorated by a street and formerly by a bridge over the river connecting Glenelg North with Glenelg. The original King Street Bridge, built in 1951, was found to be affected by concrete cancer in the late 1990s so replaced by a new bridge in 2011, and renamed the "Michael Herbert Bridge".

The weir has not precluded the need to continually dredge the outlet for boating craft to pass. A disagreement between the State Government and ferry operator Australian Ferries over the frequency dredging of sand and seaweed at the Patawalonga entrance led to the cancellation of the high-speed ferry service (featuring the Superflyte and, later, Enigma III vessels) between Glenelg and Kangaroo Island and Edithburgh on the Yorke Peninsula. The service had operated during summers from 1994 to November 2007.

=== Water quality ===
The odour of the Patawalonga has been a recurring problem ever since European settlement in the mid-19th century. It arises from seaweed that grows in the shallow depths of the river estuary and, in more recent times, stormwater pollution. Dredging of the outlet beyond the weir to remove sand and seaweed build-up would at times cause the seaweed to float back to shore and rot on the beach, causing a stench.

If too much fresh water flows into the Patawalonga it can kill off saltwater species of fish that naturally exist in the lake. An event like this occurred on the weekend of 22–23 January 2005; the front page of the Adelaide Advertiser reported that "Residents woke yesterday to an 'awful' stench and the sight of hundreds of seagulls converging on the area in a feeding frenzy".

Seawater, which enters through the South Lakes and is regularly circulated through the Patawalonga Lake, and stormwater, originating mainly from Sturt River, Brown Hill and Keswick Creeks, are both normally diverted to sea via the Barcoo Outlet. High flows of stormwater may also occasionally be permitted to enter the Patawalonga Lake for later discharge via the South Lakes.

=== Barcoo Outlet ===
From the 1970s, increasing levels of rubbish and dirty stormwater would collect in front of the weir in the Patawalonga, bringing the stench and unsightly view of debris in the water at Glenelg North and rendering the Patawalonga unusable for recreational activities such as swimming, water skiing, sailboarding and dragon boat racing Local authorities closed the Patawalonga for such activities in 1987 due to public health concerns.

Then Premier Dean Brown commissioned a review in 1995 and the then Environment Minister David Wotton promised to swim in the Patawalonga with the Premier within a year, as this was the estimated time-frame for cleaning up "the Pat".

The Barcoo Outlet was completed six years later, in December 2001, and was primarily intended to enable diversion of dirty stormwater from the catchment and away from the Patawonga Lake, at a cost of approximately A$30m. The Outlet consists of an 885-metre (2,904 ft) pipeline that diverts stormwater out of the final length of the Patawalonga and out to sea. Symbolically, the then Premier John Olsen took a media-attended swim in the Patawalonga as the State Government lifted the ban on recreational use.

The Outlet project was initially dogged with controversy, due to failures to handle stormwater and pollution of Adelaide's beaches. People north of the Outlet (itself 500m north of the Patawalonga's natural mouth) at West Beach complained that coastal drift was simply shifting pollution simply to their beaches instead of into the Patawalonga Lake. The Outlet also failed to adequately handle stormwater during heavy rainfall so stormwater pollution entered the lake section of the Patawalonga in April (2x), May and August 2002. Another failure in the Outlet in February 2003 resulted in minor flooding and consequent damage to homes in both Glenelg North and upstream Novar Gardens.

The lower section of the Patawalonga at Glenelg North is now practically operated as a lake, with seawater sometimes circulated in through the river mouth and out through the Barcoo Outlet to the north.

The Outlet is named after the frigate HMAS Barcoo, which ran aground at Glenelg North during a violent storm on 11 April 1948, and destroyed most of the jetty at Glenelg.

=== Flood of 2003 ===
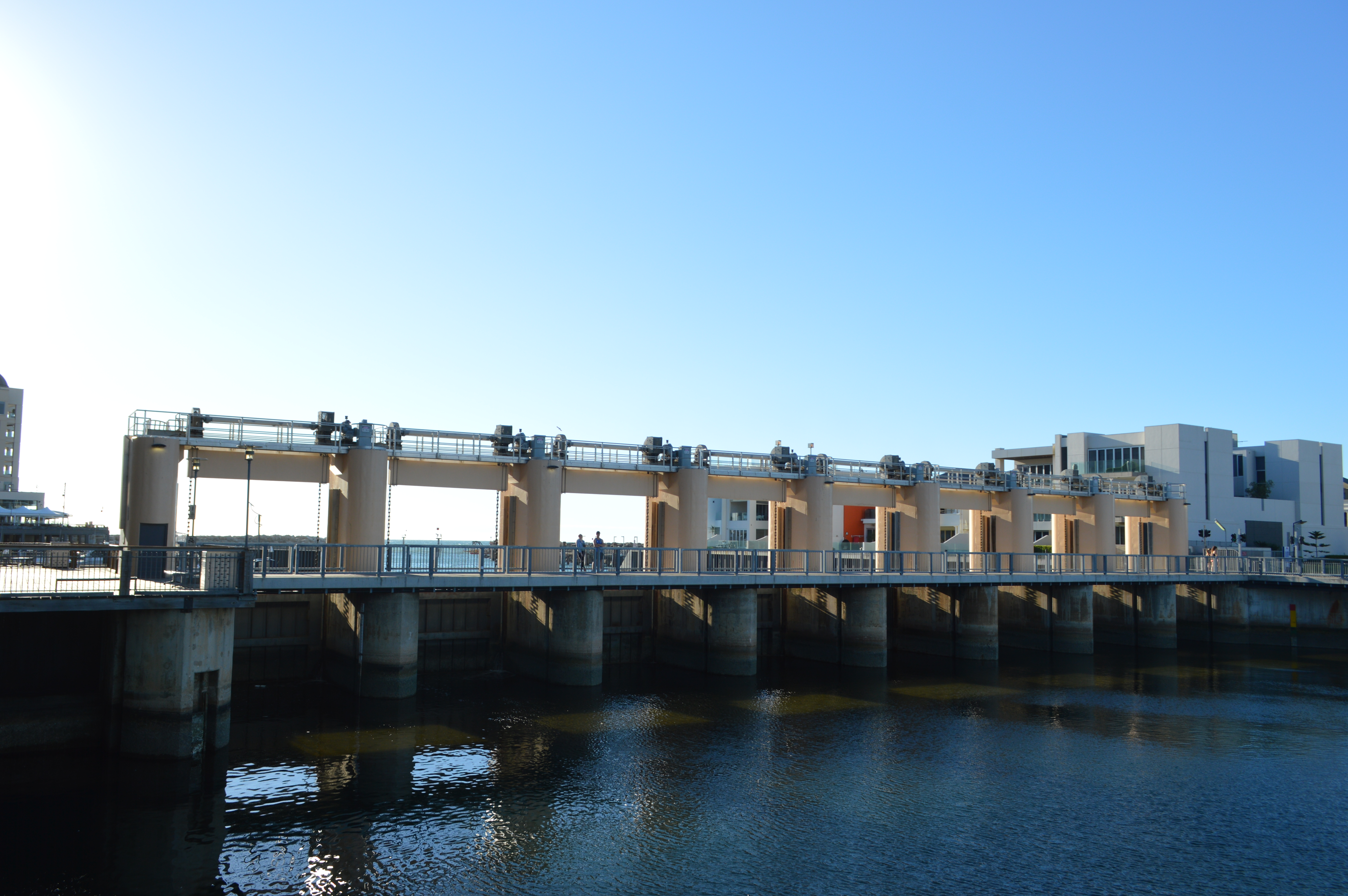
The Patawalonga weir

Heavy rainfall and a malfunction in the weir resulted in the Patawalonga breaking its banks at Glenelg North on Friday, 27 June 2003 and flooding the homes of local residents. The situation became a major political issue with the Premier, Mike Rann, declaring that he would establish a compensation fund for victims who had suffered water damage to their homes. A local newspaper report suggested that 160 homes were affected and the cause of the flooding was the gates to the weir being kept closed during a stormwater flood to protect yachts harboured in the Patawalonga Lake. 145 residents made 150 claims upon the fund and at least A$1.4m was paid to the victims, ultimately, by weir operator Baulderstone Hornibrook. A class action was later launched by 70 residents for further compensation for 'stress and inconvenience'.

== Etymology ==
"Patawalonga", literally from the Indigenous Kaurna people's language, Kaurna, is derived from Pattawilya + -ngga, or Pathawilyangga, the component parts being: Patta, which means a swamp gum tree (Eucalyptus ovata) and wilya meaning a branch while -ngga is a suffix used to indicate that the name is a location, patta-wilya-ngga the place of the branches of the swamp gum, or "swamp gum foliage place". A reference in the Manning Index of South Australian History suggests another meaning was "swamp of snakes" whilst another historian suggests it was a name given by an Aboriginal Australian crew member of Colonel Light's ship meaning "boggy and bushy stretch, with fish". The name was first recorded in print by William Williams, in his Kaurna wordlist published first in the Southern Australian on 15 May 1839 and republished in The South Australian Colonist on 14 July 1840.

In addition to names given above, the river was originally officially known as the "River Thames" and sometimes locally as the "Glenelg Creek". "River Thames" was the original name given in Light's 1836 city plan. Although the plan was approved by Governor Gawler the Indigenous name remained in common usage. Gawler encouraged colonists to collect information on Indigenous place names and he is known to have reinstated several Kaurna names in Adelaide.

== European discovery ==
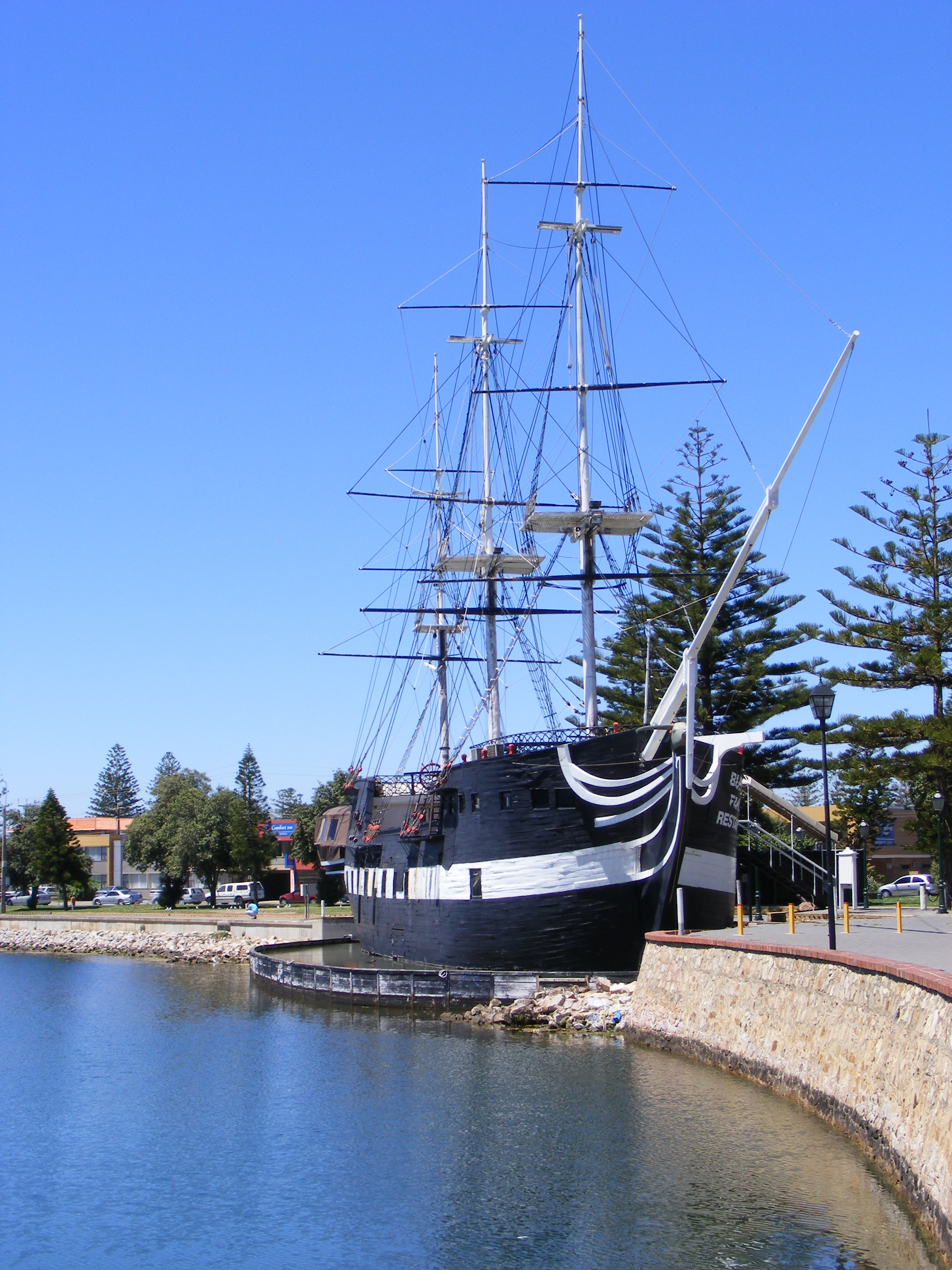
HMS Buffalo restaurant

The State Library of South Australia records that Colonel Light, sailing in a vessel called Rapid, discovered the Patawalonga River when sailing by and observing a river mouth when surveying the site for the city of Adelaide, via journal entry on 4 October 1836.

The river mouth served as the first significant river port for the colony of South Australia, with the Port River at Port Adelaide comprising a shallow, mangrove river impassable - at that time - to large ships.

One historian records:

The first boat constructed in the Patawalonga was the 22 ton cutter O.G. for the Colonial Secretary, Osmond Gilles. On the day it was launched in 1839, the boat was stranded until high tide. There was only 4 feet of water over the sand bar at the entrance.

Ships of over 300 tons, which were too big to enter Port Adelaide, discharged their passengers and cargoes at Glenelg. Floatable goods were pitched overboard and tided into the creek to the Customs House. The Customs House and flagstaff were erected in November 1839 for the accommodation of the Customs Officer and the crew of the two landing waiters. Pilots fees were still being collected on the Pat. fishing fleet of 35 vessels and for the landing of mail from the steamers until the 1880s. At that time it was called Port Glenelg.

=== HMS Buffalo ===
The original HMS Buffalo made a six-month voyage carrying the first 400 settlers to South Australia in 1836. It had also carried Captain Hindmarsh, captain of that vessel and, upon his arrival, the first Governor of South Australia.

A replica of HMS Buffalo was once permanently moored on the Patawalonga. The Buffalo replica served as a family and a la carte floating restaurant on the Patawalonga until its closure in 2013, and demolition in 2019.

== See also ==
- List of rivers of Australia § South Australia
