= Bellevue Heights, South Australia =

Bellevue Heights
- Suburb
- Country: Australia
- State: South Australia
- Region: Southern Adelaide
- City: Adelaide
- LGA: City of Mitcham
- Location: 11 km (6.8 mi) from Adelaide city centre (straight line)

Government
  - State electorate: Davenport
  - Federal division: Boothby

Population
  - Total: 2,712 (SAL 2021)
- Postcode: 5050
- County: Adelaide
Suburbs around Bellevue Heights
Bedford Park	Bedford Park; Eden Hills	Eden Hills
Bedford Park; Flagstaff Hill	Bellevue Heights	Eden Hills; Blackwood
Flagstaff Hill	Flagstaff Hill; Craigburn Farm	Craigburn Farm

Bellevue Heights is a suburb in the City of Mitcham local government area.

The southern part of the suburb includes the northern part of the Sturt Gorge Recreation Park.

Bellevue Heights is in the Adelaide foothills overlooking the city to the north or the Sturt Gorge to the south.

== History ==
The Kuarna people are the original occupants of the Adelaide hills and plains. They used the foothills for hunting and gathering, moving there in winter when the plains flooded.

When Adelaide was surveyed in 1839, the area was declared as part of Section B of the Hundred of Adelaide. It was part of Colonel William Light's second survey and was made available for settlement. Bellevue Heights became the rural property of "Windsor Farm" and later "Sturtbrae" when owned by the family of William Shephard. A road was opened through the property in 1854 after some resistance from Ann Shephard who had continued to farm the property after the death of William Shephard in 1950. It was named Shepherds Hill Road after the Shephard family and there is no record of any attempt to correct the spelling mistake.

Bellevue Heights Land For Sale 1955

In 1955 Murray Hill opened sales of building blocks to the new suburb and named the area after Bellevue Hill in Sydney.

Bellevue Heights Post Office opened on 1 September 1960 and closed in 1984.

== Amenities ==
- Bellevue Heights Primary School
- Nursing Homes
- Sturt Gorge Recreation Park
- Manson Oval Sporting Facility
- Bellevue Heights Tennis Club
- ClearVision Church

== Governance ==
Bellevue Heights is located within the federal division of Boothby, the state electoral district of Davenport and the local government area of City of Mitcham.
