= Craigburn Farm, South Australia =

Craigburn Farm
- Suburb
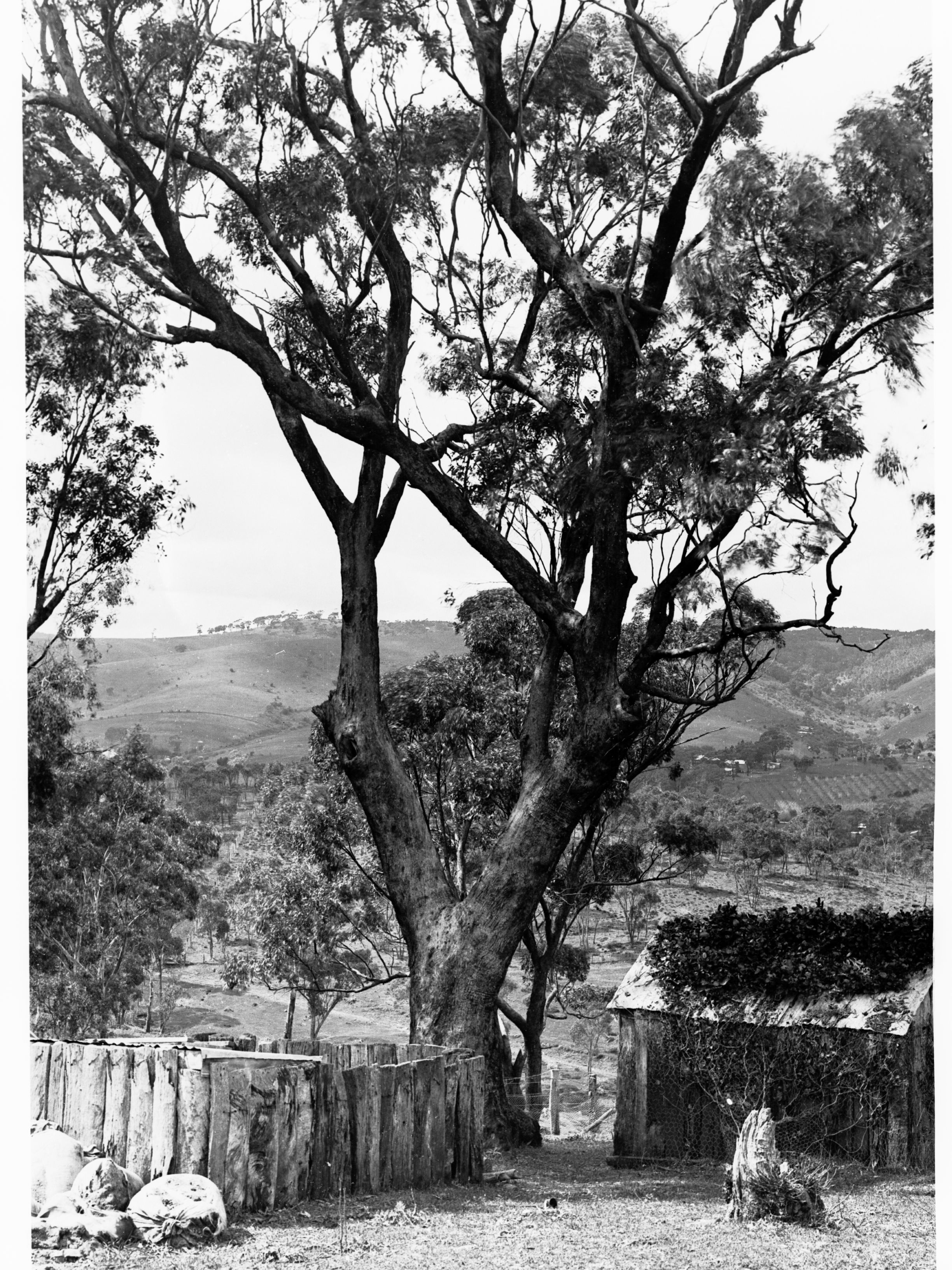
- Minda Home property at Craigburn

- Coordinates: 35°02′28″S 138°36′19″E
- Country: Australia
- State: South Australia
- City: Adelaide
- LGA: City of Mitcham
- Location: 12 km (7.5 mi) from Adelaide (straight line)
- Established: 1995

Government
  - State electorate: Waite
  - Federal division: Mayo

Population
  - Total: 3,099 (SAL 2021)
- Postcode: 5051
Suburbs around Craigburn Farm
Eden Hills	Blackwood	Hawthorndene
Bellevue Heights	Craigburn Farm	Coromandel Valley
Flagstaff Hill	Flagstaff Hill	Coromandel Valley

Craigburn Farm is a suburb of Adelaide, South Australia, Australia. It is located about 17 km by road south of the city centre.

== History ==
From 1934 until its sale as a housing development, Craigburn Farm was a farm and dormitory for children with intellectual disabilities owned and operated by Minda Inc. Craigburn Farm, the suburb, was established on 29 June 1995. The land was sold by Minda Inc to the Adelaide Development Company.

== Population ==
In 2016, Craigburn Farm had a population of 2,394. The residents are typically well-educated with 33.6% having a university qualification compared with 18.55% of South Australians and 22% of Australians in general. The majority of residents were born in Australia (72.9%) and had parents who were both born in Australia. The medium weekly income of households is almost double that of South Australian households in general.

Housing in the suburb is almost exclusively large detached family homes that are owner-occupied.

Craigburn Farm has become a popular residential area since the estate of Blackwood Park was established in 1998. The estate consists of three distinct 'nodes', each divided by tree-lined gullies and significant areas of open space. The newest 'node', "Meridian" is bordered by the Sturt River and Sturt Gorge Recreation Park, and includes the newly located Sales and Information Centre for the estate.

== Transportation ==
The suburb is served by a bus service and the nearby Coromandel railway station on the Belair line.

== Education ==
Thirty percent of residents in Craigburn Farm are aged under 20 years. There is one school located in Craigburn Farm, St Peter's Lutheran Primary School. The suburb is zoned for Flagstaff Oval Kindergarten.

Nearby state primary schools are:

- Blackwood Primary School
- Bellevue Heights Primary School
- Flagstaff Hill R–7 School

Craigburn Farm is zoned for Blackwood High School.

There are a number of private schools that have school buses to Craigburn Farm, including:

- Concordia College, Highgate
- Mercedes College, Springfield
- St John's Grammar School, Belair

The nearest university is Flinders University in Bedford Park.

== Recreation ==
Craigburn Farm adjoins the Sturt Gorge Recreation Park which includes a range of various walking and riding trails with views across Flagstaff Hill, Aberfoyle Park, Happy Valley, stretching down to the coast. There is diverse fauna in the park that wanders into Craigburn Farm including kangaroos, koalas, and echidnas. Many waterfalls, creeks and gullies are also scattered and found throughout the area.

== Politics ==
=== Federal ===
Craigburn Farm is covered by two Federal Electoral Divisions, the federal Division of Boothby and federal Division of Mayo.

=== State ===
Craigburn Farm is covered by one State Electoral District, the South Australian Legislative Assembly state electoral district of Waite, whose current member is Catherine Hutchesson, a member of the Australian Labor Party.

=== Local ===
Craigburn Farm is in the City of Mitcham, represented by a mayor and several ward councillors.
