= Sturt Gorge Recreation Park =

Protected area in South Australia

- IUCN category III (natural monument or feature)
- Location within South Australia
- Location: South Australia
- Nearest city: Adelaide
- Coordinates: 35°02′30″S 138°34′35″E
- Area: 2.44 km^{2} (0.94 sq mi)
- Established: 4 October 1973
- Governing body: Department for Environment and Water
- Website: Official website

The Sturt Gorge Recreation Park is a protected area in the Australian state of South Australia located in the suburbs of Bellevue Heights, Craigburn Farm and Flagstaff Hill within the Adelaide metropolitan area about 13 kilometres (8.1 mi) south of the Adelaide central business district.

The park was established in 1973. and protects an area recognised as an area of great geological significance. It channels the Sturt River down to the Adelaide Plains.

The Sturt Tillite formation was the first area in the world to provide definite evidence of Cryogenian glaciation (the Snowball Earth). It is hypothesised that the landform was created from glacial material that dropped from ice floating in the ocean which covered the area 800 million years ago.

Fires of any kind are prohibited in the park.

It is classified as an IUCN Category III protected area. In 1980, the recreation park was listed on the former Register of the National Estate.

== See also ==
- List of protected areas in Adelaide
- List of canyons
