= Flagstaff Hill, South Australia =

Flagstaff Hill
- Suburb
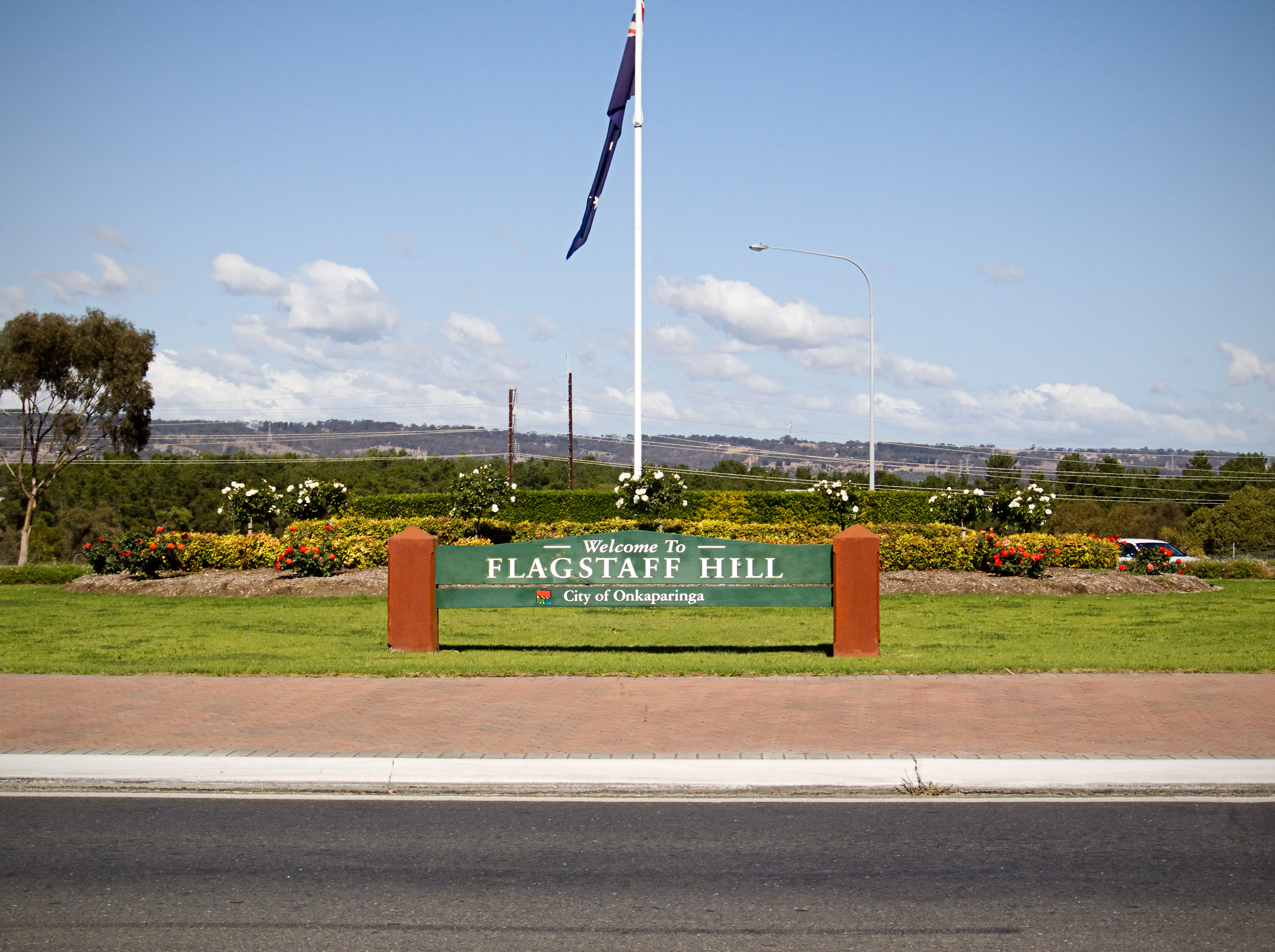
- Flagstaff Hill Roundabout

- Coordinates: 35°03′S 138°35′E
- Country: Australia
- State: South Australia
- Region: Southern Adelaide
- City: Adelaide
- LGA: City of Onkaparinga
- Location: 16 km (9.9 mi) from Adelaide
- Established: 1967

Government
  - State electorate: Fisher, Davenport
  - Federal division: Kingston

Population
  - Total: 10,184 (SAL 2021)
- Postcode: 5159
- County: Adelaide
Suburbs around Flagstaff Hill
Bedford Park; Darlington	Bellevue Heights	Craigburn Farm
O'Halloran Hill	Flagstaff Hill	Coromandel Valley
Happy Valley	Aberfoyle Park

There is also Flagstaff Hill (as a geographical feature), one near Burra (33°38′S 138°53′E) and Renmark (34°26′S 140°29′E) in South Australia. Flagstaff Hill is also the name of one of Penang Hill's peaks (5°25′28″N 100°16′08.1″E)

Flagstaff Hill is a suburb in the City of Onkaparinga, South Australia. It is named after the hill by that name in the area, where Colonel William Light erected a flagstaff during his survey, which was then used as a trig point. Flagstaff Hill is a leafy suburb established around the Sturt Gorge Recreation Park, maintaining many parks and reserves throughout the suburb.

== History ==
Colonel William Light's survey teams worked south from Adelaide throughout 1838 and 1839, leaving various marks across the landscape. One such mark was a trig point or flagstaff that was left at a grid reference of 783 192. By 1842, the area near this trig point was called the Flagstaff.

During the late nineteenth century, the Flagstaff was located in a farming and grazing region. In the 1960s, some of the land near the Flagstaff had been earmarked for suburban development.

In 1960, Hooker Rex Estates began purchasing land in the region for subdivision and over the next decade had accumulated nearly two hundred hectares. Blocks were first subdivided in the vicinity of a golf course, planners also provided an oval and recreation facilities. The first 130 blocks were released in April 1967 and sold rapidly. By 1984, all developed land had been sold.

From 1985, the suburb was extended when a portion of Minda Home's Craigburn Farm was subdivided by Essington Ltd. This division was spoken of as 'landmark residential development', due to the retention of large trees and waterways and subdivisions that fitted with the shape and orientation of the land.

The population of Flagstaff Hill was 9,950 in the 2016 census.

== Amenities ==
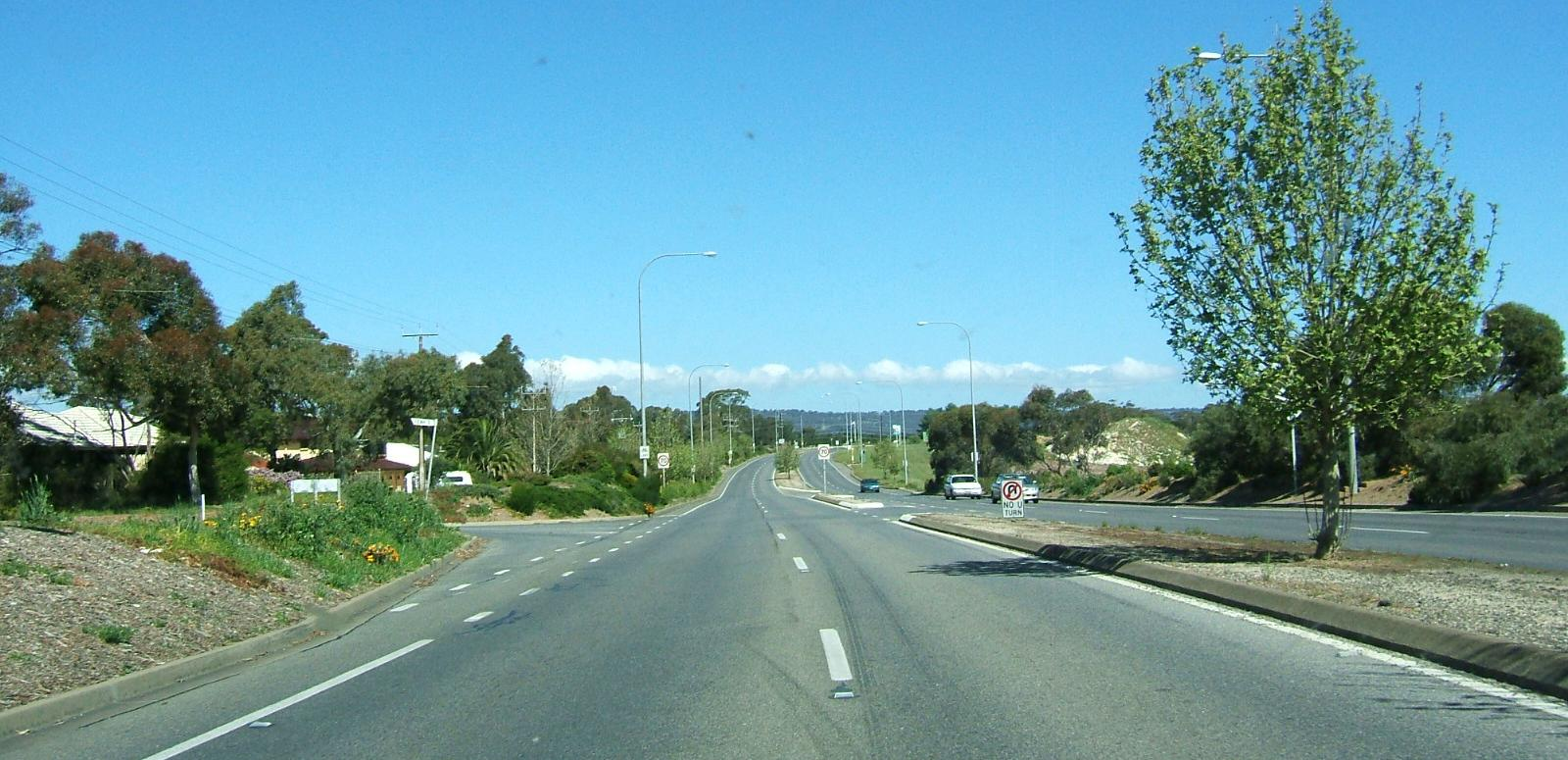
Flagstaff Road Runs as a Reversible lane.

Facilities in Flagstaff Hill include:

- Flagstaff Hill R-7 School (formerly Flagstaff Hill Primary Schools)
- Craigburn Primary School]
- Flagstaff Hill Kindergarten
- Flagstaff Oval Kindergarten
- Flagstaff Hill Community Centre
- Flagstaff Hill Scout and Guide Complex
- Sturt Gorge Recreation Park
- Flagstaff Hill Shopping Centre

== Sport ==
The team sports hub of Flagstaff Hill is the Flagstaff Hill Sports and Community Centre, home of the Flagstaff Hill Football Club, Flagstaff Hill Cricket Club, Flagstaff Hill Tennis Club, Flagstaff Athletics, Happy Valley Netball Club and Southern Hills Little Athletics.

Flagstaff Hill Golf Course is a 18-hole golf course for members and the public.

== Politics ==
Flagstaff Hill is covered by one Federal Electoral Division, the federal Division of Kingston whose representative is Amanda Rishworth (Australian Labor Party)

Flagstaff Hill is covered by the state electoral district of Davenport, whose current member is Erin Thompson (Australian Labor Party).

Flagstaff Hill is part of the Thalassa Ward of the City of Onkaparinga, represented by Councillors Marion Themeliotis and Geoff Eaton.

== See also ==
- List of Adelaide suburbs
