= Margaret Worth =

Australian artist

Margaret G. Worth (born 1944) is an Australian artist, who has worked as a painter, screen printer and sculptor. She studied music, pure and applied math and sciences before she turned to studies in art in 1962. Her art allowed her to seek to combine her wonder in science and spirituality. Her work is represented in the Australian national and state galleries, and in private collections in Australia and the United States.

== Development as an artist ==
Born in Adelaide, South Australia in 1944, Worth spent three years teaching before leaving to practice as an artist. From 1962 she studied at the South Australian School of Art where she was influenced by Dora Chapman, Geoff Wilson and Sydney Ball. Ball, an abstract painter who had recently returned from New York and would later become her husband.

In 1969 Worth moved with Ball to New York. There she studied at the School of Visual Arts with feminist theorist and curator Lucy Lippard and the sculptor Richard Serra. She attended the School of Visual Arts in 1969–70 and subsequently spent two years at Columbia University.

While studying, Worth worked producing screen prints for artists including Robert Rauschenberg, Sol LeWitt and Jim Dines. After graduation from Columbia, she taught 3D Design at the Parsons School of Design, and drawing at Sarah Lawrence College, and Columbia-Greene Community College.

She returned to Adelaide in 1984 and is now a resident of Victor Harbor, South Australia.

== Art works ==
=== Paintings ===
In the 1960s Worth was an abstract painter who worked in slabs and s-curves of bold and brilliant colours, on both flat and shaped canvases. Her first exhibition in Adelaide in the 1960s were of such paintings. The National Gallery of Australia holds two paintings and several prints from Worth's Samsara series that depicts her interpretation of the Sanskrit word which refers to the cycle of death and rebirth. The series includes bands of pure colour that move rhythmically and mysteriously across shaped canvases. In 2020 three of the series were featured in the NGA's Know My Name National Art Event.

=== Sculpture ===
Worth evolved into a sculptor and installation artist. In 1988 an exhibition showed 'Forest Fragment' works made by using a pruning saw to carve polystyrene, a petroleum product, and coloured them with acrylic paints. By the 1990s she was working with a variety of materials for both interior and outside sculpture installations.

=== Emerging media ===
Cross-disciplinary works brought Margaret Worth together with Bridgette Minuzzo, Heather Frahn and Lorry Wedding to collaborate on the presentation or an integrated and immersive installation about sound, water and energy waves. It comprised moving image, sound, cymatic wave effects, performance and objects.

=== In Collections ===
Examples of her work are held in the National Gallery of Australia; National Gallery Victoria; Art Gallery of South Australia; Art Gallery NSW; Queensland Art Gallery GOMA as well as the Cruthers Collection WA; Artbank, Australia; Columbia University, New York, USA; Flinders University SA; Curtin University, WA; Mornington Peninsula Regional Gallery Vic., New England Regional Art Gallery NSW; Murray Bridge Regional Gallery SA; University of South Australia

=== Exhibitions ===
Since 2004 Worth has appeared in 20 special projects and exhibitions. For Example:

2020 Worth featured in the year long 'Know My Name' program at the National Gallery of Australia including the Billboards Project across Australia and the exhibition.

2018 In ‘Landfall’, the Lorne VIC Sculpture Biennale 2018, Worth won the Non-Acquisitive Award valued at $20,000 with her work ‘VAJRASANA meditation’.

2015 Worth presented 'Mining the Mind' at Flinders Medical Centre SA. Five elemental works combine sound and moving images of energy with sand, salt, graphite and carbon. The installations create environments for the individual where the real, the remembered and the imagined can merge.

2013 The artist installed 'Where Are You? What time is it? How do you know?' at Araluen in central Australia and at Goolwa, regional SA. CCTV, glass, sand and polystyrene were used to create different environments in which the viewer appeared simultaneously on screen.

2010 she partnered Pam Kouwenhoven in the exhibition 'Drop the Dust' for the South Australian Living Artists Festival in 2010. Subsequently it toured eastern Australia over 2 years.

=== Commissions and Permanent Installations ===
2020	VAJRASANA meditation, Government House Canberra Australia.
2019	AS ONE, Government House SA, a figurehead presenting the role of governor.
2016	WALKING LOOKING TALKING / NOPPAN NUKKAN YUNNIN, 21st century rock painting Granite Island SA.
2008	MAKING TRACKS + SWINGING TALES, Causeway and Foreshore Entrances, Port Augusta SA.
2003	COLLECTING THOUGHTS, interactive sound work, Technology Park, Mawson Lakes SA
2003	ON OCCUPIED TERRITORY, Victor Harbor, memorial to the meeting of Matthew Flinders and Nicolas Baudin, Encounter Bay SA.
2002	SALT WALL and solar powered ‘IRRIGATION FOUNTAIN’ art installations, Waikerie on R. Murray SA
1999	THE ELEMENTS AT PLAY, Brighton Jetty, SA, light, wind and the waves create sound and visual art works.
1997	TJIRBRUKI GATEWAY, Marion SA, a reconciliation project and event with on-going ceremonies.
1995	ADELAIDE ARRIVE, art & Design Concept for air and rail entrances to Adelaide, includes bus shelters, pavement inlays, Mile End Wall.

== Awards ==
2018	Government House Residency and sculpture commission, Arts SA & Country Arts SA.
2018	LORNE SCULPTURE BIENNALE 2018 AWARD, Victoria. www.lornesculpture.com
2017	ARTS SA IMPP Grant, Project Development ‘VAJRASANA meditation’ for exhibit LSB18.
2015	SA Digital Theatre Mentorship, Country Arts SA. http://www.countryarts.org.au/news/welcome-to-our-digital-theatre-mentee/#sthash.9KcrpcmE.dpuf
2014	Arts SA, impp Grants for Professional & Project Development in Digital Media.
2012	Centenary of Canberra Celebrations, grant for Project Development & Presentation Robyn Archer’s ‘One River’ http://oneriver.com.au/one-river-projects/one-river-goolwa-and-murray-mouth/
2012	Arts SA, grant for New Work Development and exhibition on multiple realities.
2012	Country Arts SA, grant for professional development in using digital media.
2011	Environmental Award, Sculpture by the Sea, Brighton Jetty Classic.
2009	Arts SA, grant for New Works Development and exhibition on Dusts.
2003	Encounter 2002, National Major Events Award, Victor Harbor installation and launch component: https://margaretworth.com.au/works/on-occoupied-territory----encounter-2002-encounter-bay-2003
2002	ARTS SA, grant for Research and Development and exhibition of environmentally interactive wind instruments.
1999	Civic Trust Award SA Brighton Jetty art installation ‘The Elements at Play’ https://margaretworth.com.au/works/the-elements-at-play----brighton-jetty-sa
1996	National & State Awards, Healthy Heart Local Govt. Best Specialist Project Perry Barr Farm, ‘Play Way’.
1995	National CEAD Award Community Environment Art & Design, National Sir Zelman Cowan Award, RAIA Award South Australia, BHP Award, Civic Trust Award South Australia Swallowcliffe Schools.https://margaretworth.com.au/works/swallowcliffe-schools--davoren-park
