= Brown Hill =

Brown Hill or Brownhill may refer to:

- Brown Hill, Victoria - a suburb in Ballarat, Victoria, Australia
- Brown Hill Creek - a river in Adelaide, South Australia
- Brown Hill, Mitcham - a hill in Mitcham, South Australia
- Electoral district of Brown Hill - an electorate in Western Australia
- Brownhill, a suburb in Blackburn, Lancashire, England
- Brownhill, County Fermanagh, a townland in County Fermanagh, Northern Ireland
- Brownhill, County Tyrone, a townland in County Tyrone, Northern Ireland
- Brown Hill, Huntly

== People ==
- Brownhill (surname)

== See also ==
- Brownhills, a town in West Midlands, England
