= Brown Hill Creek, South Australia =

Brown Hill Creek
- Suburb
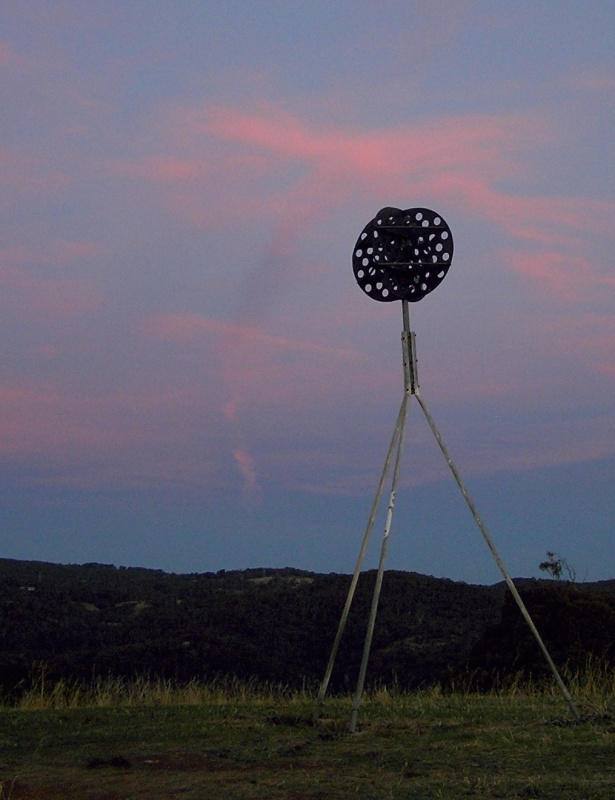
- Brown Hill trig station

- Coordinates: 34°59′13″S 138°39′11″E
- Country: Australia
- State: South Australia
- City: Adelaide
- LGA: City of Mitcham

Population
  - Total: 71 (SAL 2021)
- Postcode: 5062
Suburbs around Brown Hill Creek
Springfield	Urrbrae	Mount Osmond
Mitcham	Brown Hill Creek	Leawood Gardens
Belair	Belair	Crafers West

Brown Hill Creek is a south-eastern suburb of Adelaide in the City of Mitcham in South Australia, named in 1991 after Brown Hill Creek which flows from east to west through the locality. The creek itself was named after Brown Hill which rises immediately south-east of Mitcham village.

The area beside the creek in the suburbs of Mitcham and Brown Hill Creek was known to the Kaurna people of the Adelaide Plains as Wirraparinga, meaning "creek and scrub place".

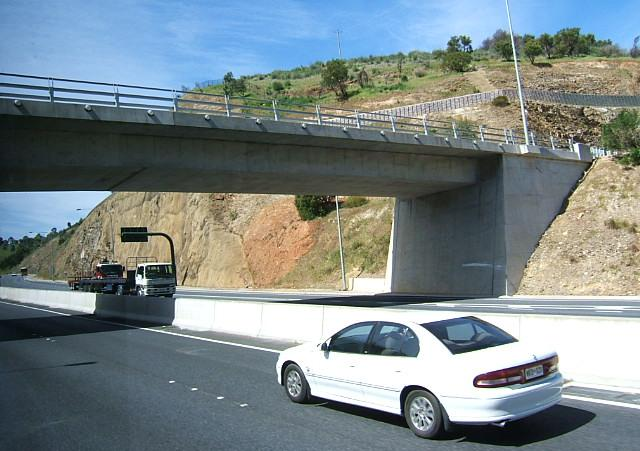
The suburb of Brown Hill Creek extends southwards for about 4 km (2.5 mi) from Mount Osmond, in the right of the picture.

The creek valley south of Brown Hill is home to Brownhill Creek Recreation Park and has been the site a recreation park since the late 1800s. A bathing hole was established at a constructed dam on the creek near Mitcham village in 1894 but was removed eight years later to protect the interests of market gardeners upstream. A a stone plaque declaring a "pleasure resort" from the early part of the 20th century still stands at the entrance to the valley, where Mitcham borders the suburb of Brown Hill Creek. The recreation reserve extends several kilometres upstream into the main creek valley through the heart of the suburb.
