= Daylighted =

Daylighted and similar may refer to:

- Daylighting in the architectural sense, to use natural light for indoor illumination
- Daylighting (streams)
- Daylighting (tunnels)
