= Daylighting (tunnels) =

Removing the "roof" off a tunnel

Daylighting a tunnel is to remove its "roof" of overlying rock and soil, exposing the railway or roadway to daylight and converting it to a railway or roadway cut. Tunnels are often daylighted to improve vertical or horizontal clearances—for example, to accommodate double-stack container trains or electrifying rail lines, where increasing the size of the tunnel bore is impractical.

== List of daylighted tunnels ==
=== Australia ===
- The Moocomonga Tunnel carried the Central Western railway line through the Gogango Range in Queensland, Australia (23.70164°S 149.92430°E). It opened in 1876. The tunnel was daylighted in 1983 due to rock falls which blocked the tunnel from time to time.
- The Coromandel and Pinera Tunnels on the Belair line in Adelaide, South Australia, both built as a single track tunnel with the line in 1883, were daylighted in the 1920s when the line to Belair was duplicated.
- The Arncliffe Tunnel on the NSW South Coast Line was daylighted and replaced with a road bridge when the track was quadruplicated in 1921
- The Waterfall Tunnel on the NSW South Coast Line was daylighted in 1914 when the line was duplicated.

=== New Zealand ===
- The railway line through the Manawatū Gorge, when constructed in 1891, had five tunnels. Three of these(Tunnels No. 3, 4 and 5) were daylighted in 2008 to allow for the carriage of large containers (the other two tunnels had their floors lowered).
- The Macgregor Tunnel on the Main South Line was daylighted in 1971 to allow for container freight.* Tunnels No. 22 and 23. were daylighted in 1981 and 1979 respectively on the Main North Line.
- The Mercer Tunnel was daylighted in 1956 on the North Island Main Trunk.
- The Makohine Tunnel was daylighted in 1984 on the North Island Main Trunk.
- The Kiwi Tunnel was daylighted in 1972 on the North Island Main Trunk. This alignment has since been bypassed in 1985 however.

=== United Kingdom ===
  - Liverpool Lime Street station was originally approached through a 1.13-mile (1.82 km) twin-track tunnel completed in 1836. The tunnel was daylighted in the 1880s, and replaced with a deep four-track cutting, with only the eastern 50 metres (55 yd) approaching Edge Hill railway station remaining as a tunnel.

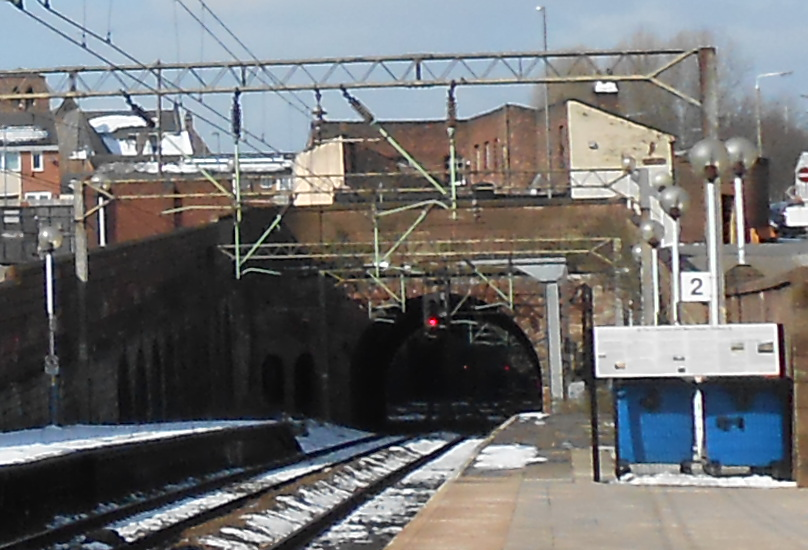
The short remaining portion of Liverpool's Lime Street Station tunnel can be seen west of Edge Hill Station.

=== United States of America ===
- Auburn Tunnel on the Schuylkill Canal, daylighted in 1857.
- Tunnel No. 5 on the Alaska Railroad's Seward-Anchorage line.
- Tunnel No. 5 on the Virginia & Truckee Railroad at Nevada S.R. 341 near Virginia City.
- The Gwynedd Cut on the North Pennsylvania Railroad, near North Wales, Pennsylvania, built as a tunnel between 1853 and 1856, daylighted in 1930 when the Reading Railroad electrified the line.
- A number of tunnels were open cut for the National Gateway project including:
  - Shoo Fly Tunnel (2012)
  - Pinkerton Tunnel (2012)
  - Benford Tunnel (2012)

== See also ==
- Daylighting (streams)
