= Pinera railway station =

Railway station in Adelaide, South Australia

Coordinates: 35.0008°S 138.6242°E

Pinera
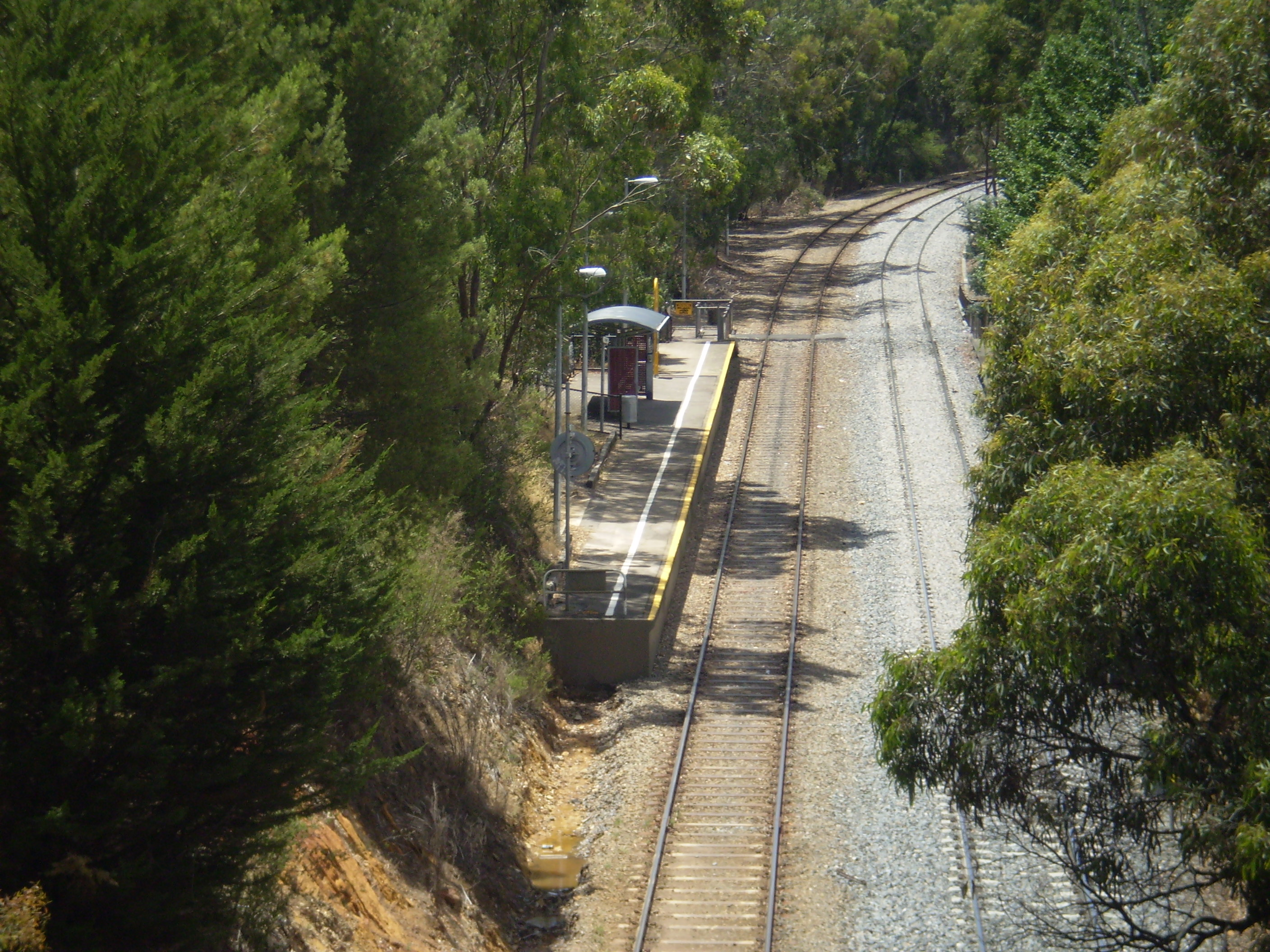
- North-east bound view of the station platform, viewed from Main Road overpass, December 2007

General information
- Location: Main Road, Belair
- Owner: Department for Infrastructure and Transport
- Operator: Adelaide Metro
- Line: Belair
- Distance: 20.2 km from Adelaide
- Platforms: 1
- Bus routes: 196, 196F, 673, 893, 952, 954

Construction
- Structure type: Ground
- Parking: No
- Cycle facilities: No
- Accessible: Yes

Other information
- Station code: 16557 (to City); 18571 (to Belair)
- Website: Adelaide Metro

History
- Opened: 1920s

Services
Preceding station	Adelaide Metro	Following station
Glenalta towards Adelaide	Belair line	Belair Terminus
Location

Pinera railway station is located on the Belair line in the Adelaide southern foothills suburb of Belair, 20.2 kilometres from Adelaide station.

== History ==
Pinera was opened in the 1920s as Overway Bridge. The name was derived from the bridge that carries Main Road over a cutting immediately west of the station. The cutting came about when the former No. 5 Tunnel was opened as a result of the duplication of the line between Eden Hills and Belair during the 1920s. The station was renamed Pinera in July 1946, with the new name broadly translating to '"steep hill"'.

On 31 January 1928, six rail workers were killed and three seriously injured when the No. 5 Tunnel (Former Pinera Tunnel) they were demolishing immediately west of the station, collapsed after heavy rain.

In 1995, the inbound line was converted to standard gauge as part of the One Nation Adelaide-Melbourne line gauge conversion project.

== Services by platform ==
Platform	Destination/s
1	Adelaide/Belair
