= Brown Hill Creek =

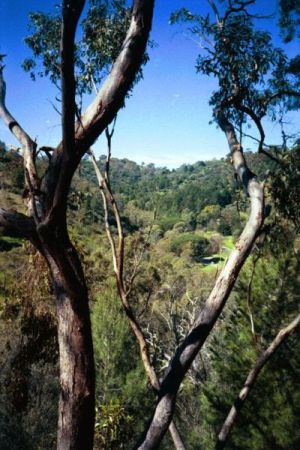
- Brown Hill Creek near Mitcham

- Location of the creek mouth in South Australia
- Native name: Willawilla (Kaurna)

Location
- Country: Australia
- State: South Australia
- Region: Metropolitan Adelaide
- Town: Brown Hill Creek

Physical characteristics
- Source: Mount Lofty Ranges
- Mouth: Patawalonga River
  - location: south of Mitcham
  - coordinates: 34°59′02″S 138°39′04″E

Basin features
- River system: Patawalonga River
- Nature reserve: Brownhill Creek Recreation Park

Brown Hill Creek, also known as Willawilla in the Kaurna language, is a watercourse flowing from the Adelaide Hills through in the inner south suburbs of the Adelaide metropolitan area, in the Australian state of South Australia. It is part of the Patawalonga River catchment.

== Course and features ==
The creek rises on the western slopes of the Mount Lofty Ranges near Crafers and flows generally in a west-north-west direction through the suburb of Brown Hill Creek, south of Brown Hill, a prominent hill rising immediately south-east of Mitcham village, and beneath the historic Keystone Bridge in Mitcham itself, the vicinity traditionally known as Wirraparinga.

From Mitcham the creek continues along a north-western path through Torrens Park, Hawthorn, Unley Park, Millswood and Forestville before flowing into a constructed drain at Forestville Reserve. From there the flows are directed through inner south-west suburbs to join the Patawalonga River on the southern edge of Adelaide Airport, near Netley.

State government records state that the full downstream extent of the original creek is unknown due to the construction of drains along the creek line.

== Human use ==
The area beside the creek in the suburbs of Mitcham and Brown Hill Creek was known to the Kaurna people of the Adelaide Plains as Wirraparinga, meaning "creek and scrub place".

The creek valley south of Brown Hill is home to Brownhill Creek Recreation Park and has been the site of a recreation park since the late 1800s. A bathing hole was established at a constructed dam on the creek near Mitcham village in 1894 but was removed eight years later to protect the interests of market gardeners. A camping ground at the entrance to the valley was declared in 1954 in the 120-acre (49 ha) "National Pleasure resort" and a stone plaque declaring a "pleasure resort" from the early part of the 20th century still stands at the site. A caravan park is presently located at the site of the original camping ground and the recreation reserve extends several kilometres upstream into the main creek valley.

The upper reaches of the creek are utilised especially for market gardening and also watering pasture. In the 1870s, some of the upper gullies of the creek were considered as a possible location for a reservoir to supply Adelaide's growing population with water. Thorndon Park Reservoir was eventually built instead.

== See also ==
- List of rivers of Australia § South Australia
