= Pinera Tunnel =

Railroad tunnel in Australia

The Pinera Tunnel (also known as the "No. 5 Tunnel") was a railway tunnel on the Adelaide-Nairne Railway (now Belair railway line) in the Adelaide Hills that existed from 1883 to 1928.

== History ==
The former No. 5 Tunnel was a rail tunnel on the Belair railway line located beneath Main Road that connects the Adelaide Hills suburbs of Belair and Blackwood. It was the first ever railroad tunnel constructed in the Adelaide Hills region. Completed in 1881 as part of the first stage of the Adelaide-Nairne Railway (which formally opened in 1883), the tunnel was replaced by a bridge in 1928.

On 31 January 1928, the tunnel was the site of a fatal rail construction accident while rail duplication work was underway and the tunnel was being replaced with a cutting. Six workers were killed when an estimated 150 tons (136 metric tonnes) of earth fell onto the tunnel site during heavy afternoon rains.

== Construction ==
All tunnels built along the Adelaide and Nairne Railway in the early 1880s were of the same specification being 16 ft 6 in (5.03 m) high and 15 ft (4.6 m) wide. The tunnel was lined with bricks that were made from clay excavated from an adjoining quarry and nearby railway cuttings, and fired at brickworks immediately south of the No. 3 Tunnel in Eden Hills

== Gallery ==
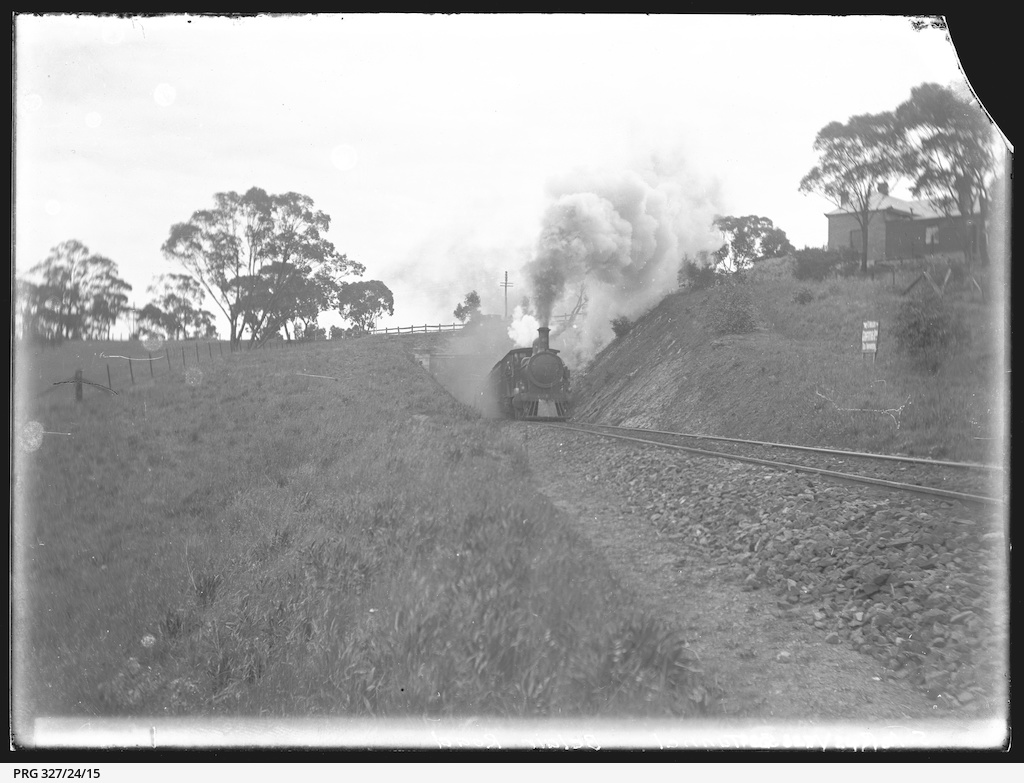
Train exiting No. 5 Tunnel at Belair, South Australia c.1915

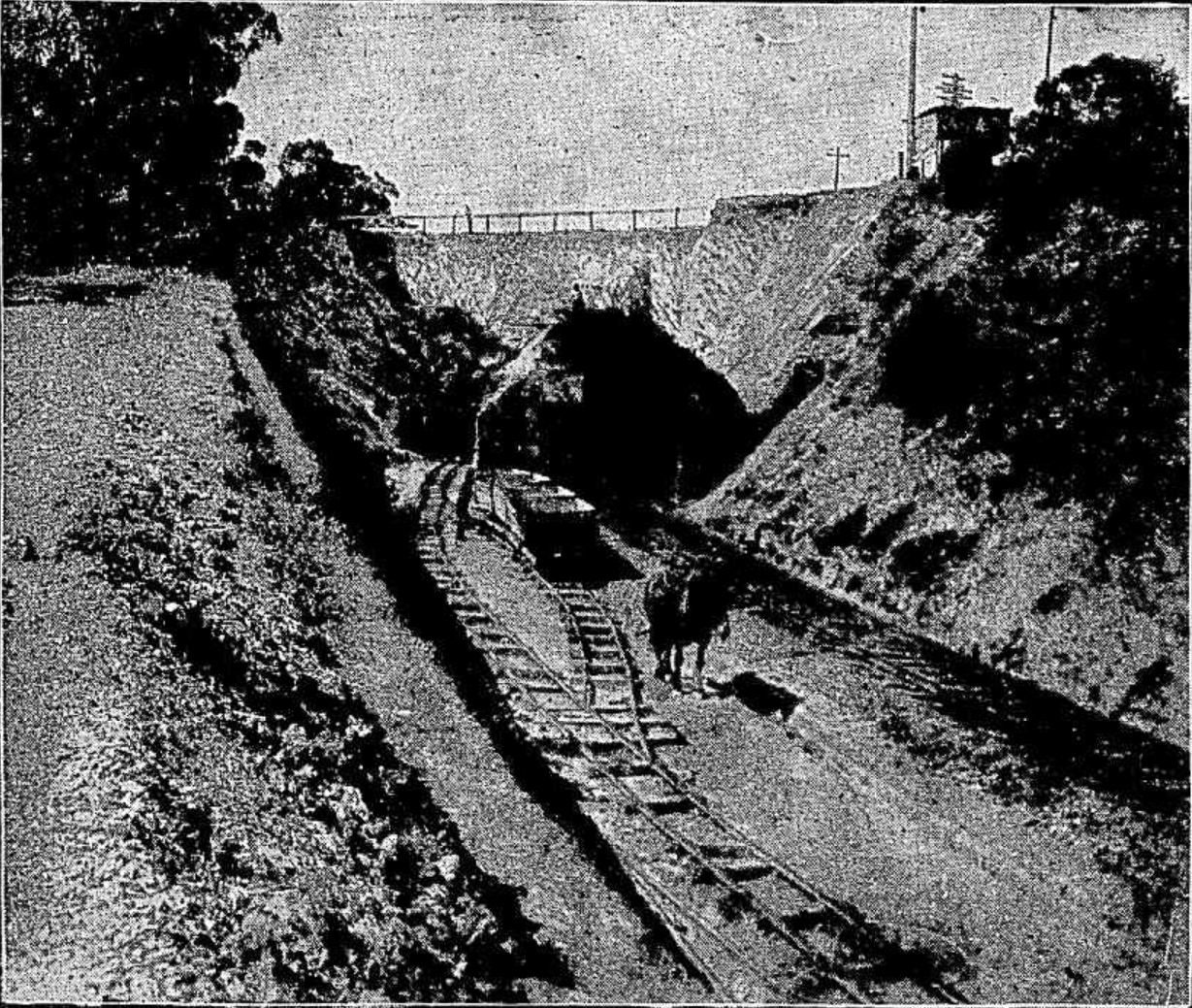
1928 rail duplication works at No. 5 Tunnel.

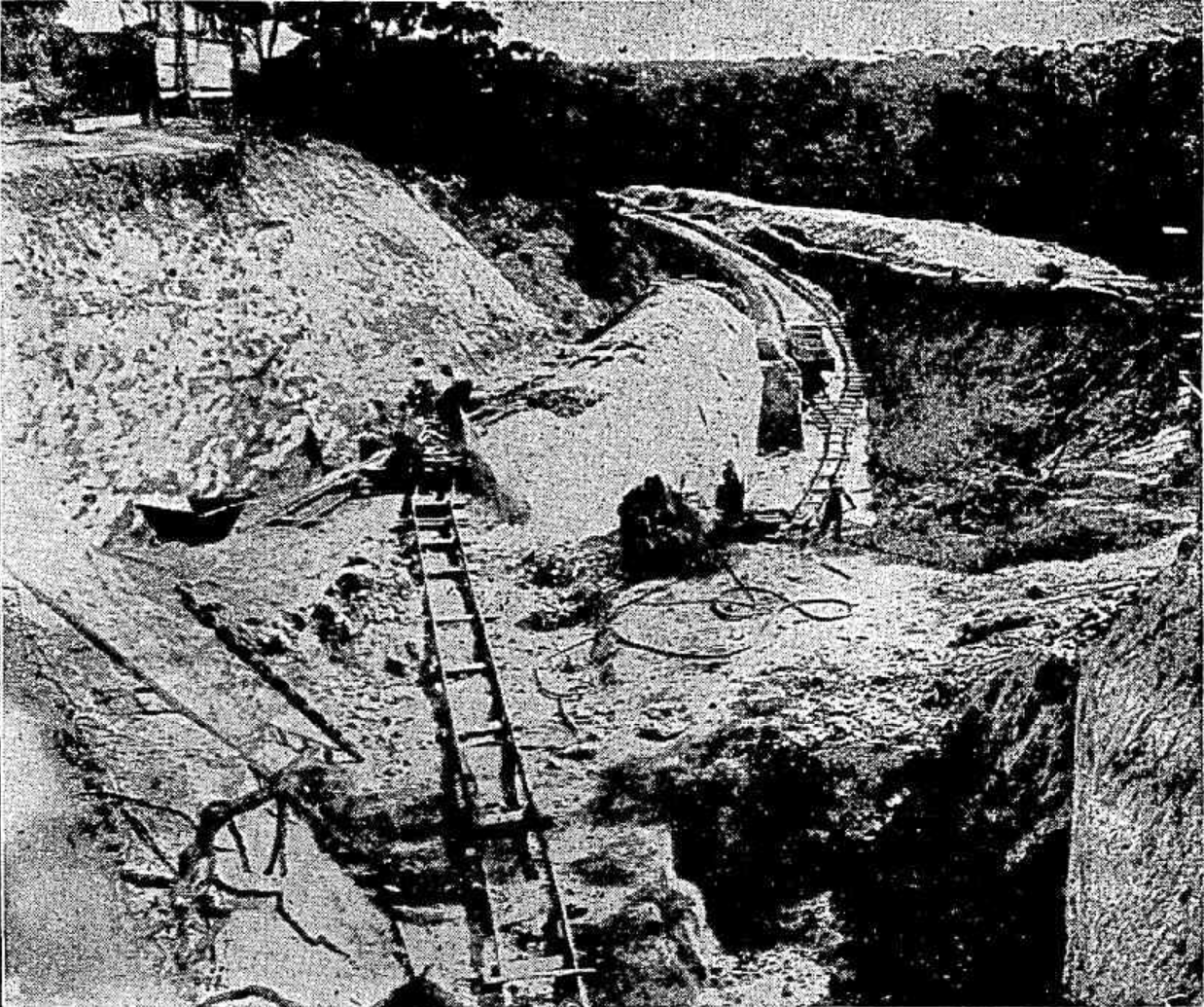
1928 rail duplication works at No. 5 Tunnel.

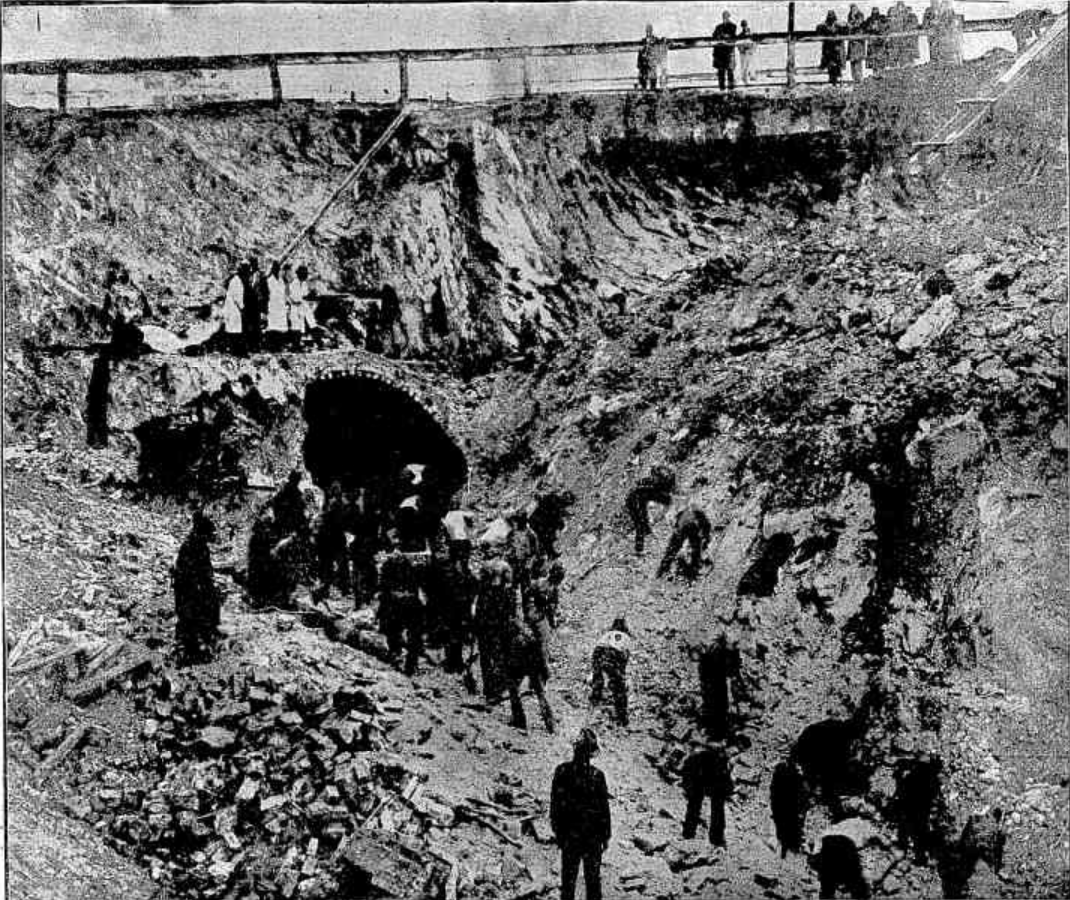
Landslide rescue efforts on the evening of 31 January 1928.

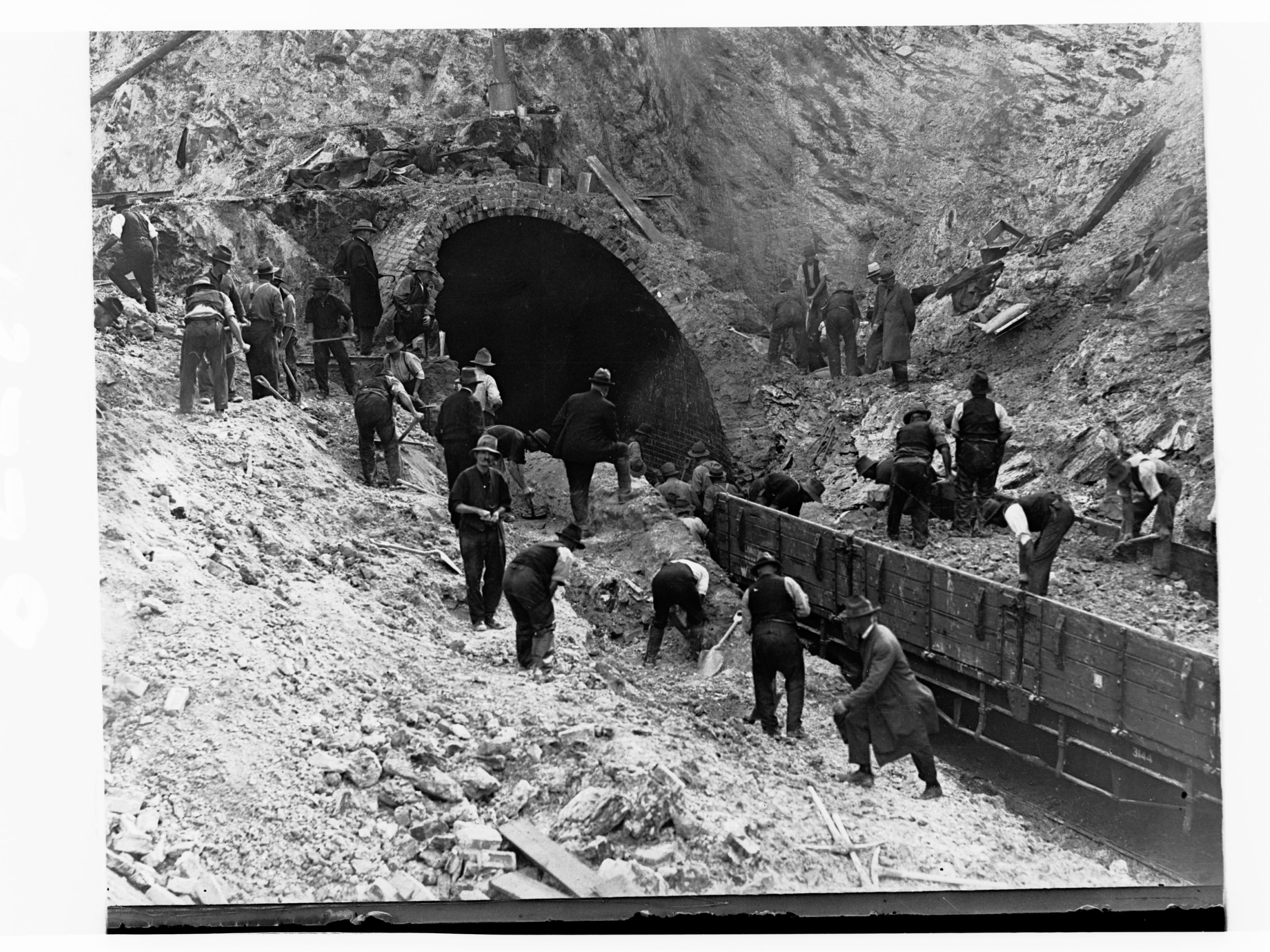
Rescue and recovery efforts on the day after the landslide (1 February 1928).

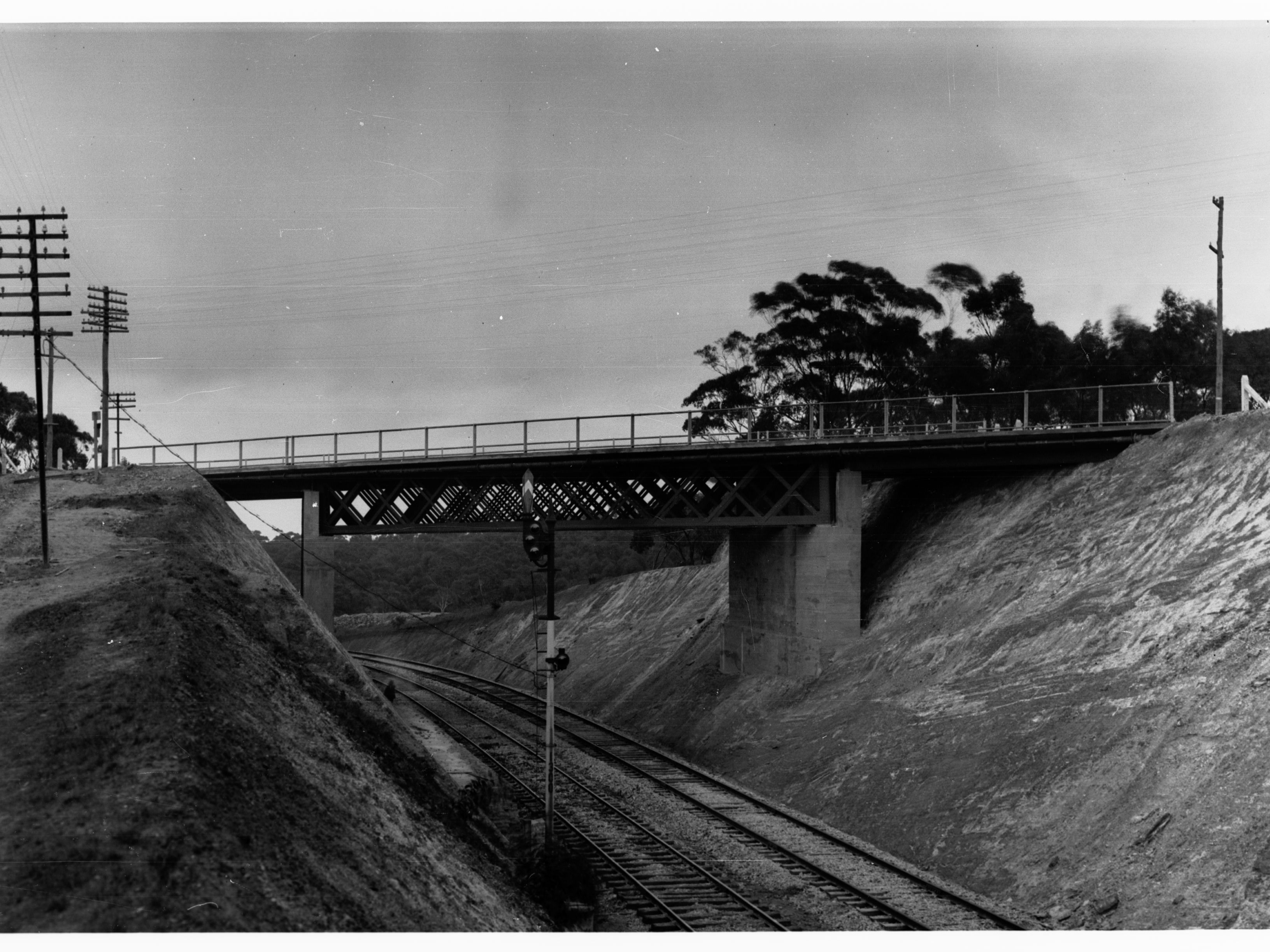
Completed Overway Bridge on 30 June 1928
