= Hawthorndene, South Australia =

Hawthorndene
- Suburb
- Coordinates: 35.020°S 138.631°E
- Country: Australia
- State: South Australia
- City: Adelaide
- LGA: City of Mitcham
- Established: 1925

Government
  - State electorate: Waite
  - Federal division: Mayo

Population
  - Total: 3,389 (SAL 2021)
- Postcode: 5051
Suburbs around Hawthorndene
Blackwood	Glenalta; Belair	Belair
Blackwood	Hawthorndene	Upper Sturt
Coromandel Valley	Coromandel Valley; Coromandel East	Coromandel East

Hawthorndene is a south-eastern suburb located in the Foothills of the Mount Lofty Ranges of Adelaide, South Australia. It is in the City of Mitcham. It is in the state electorate of Waite and the federal electorate of Mayo.

Hawthorndene has a population of 3,389 according to the 2021 census.

Hawthorndene is home to the popular Apex Park, Suffolk Road Reserve and Hawthorndene Oval. Joan's Pantry was first opened in 1920. It overlooks Hawthorndene Oval and has a Community Garden.

Hawthorndene is also home to the Blackwood CFS South Australian Country Fire Service Station which is located on Gorse Ave, Hawthorndene.

== History ==
The Kaurna people are the original owners and custodians of the Adelaide plains and foothills.

In 1854 Alexander Wardlaw took up the land and before he died in 1894 the area was known as Wardlaw Vale. The European settlement was further developed in from 1894 to1896 from an orchard of 160 acres named Watahuna established by Daniel Hewett.

Government Experimental Orchard c 1934

The Government Experimental Orchard was established in 1908. It was used for the development and testing of fruit varieties and cultural techniques. In 1934 the orchard was growing about 4100 fruit varieties. The orchard closed in 1972.

The first subdivision of Hawthorndene was created by A.E. and D.J. Hewett on part sections 871–2, Hundred of Adelaide in 1925; however, it was not until 1988 that its boundaries were completely formalised. Its name refers to the many Hawthorn bushes growing along Minno Creek as a result of seeds being washed down the creek from the Hawthorn maze in the Belair National Park and from a Hawthorn hedge planted by C. Legh Winser around his orchard in what is now Glenalta. When the majority of the population and houses that are there now were put in, the suburb was called "Blackwood Estate".

== Education ==
Hawthorndene Primary School on Suffolk Road opened on 25 May 1965. It caters for students from Reception to Year 6 with specialist programs in Physical education, Japanese and Performing Arts. In term 3 2025 there were 290 enrolled students.

== Transport ==
Blackwood railway station and bus interchange are on the western boundary of the suburb and local routes 195, 195F, 196 and 196F operate to and from the city from Blackwood Interchange via Suffolk Road and Rankeys Hill Road.

== Parks and Recreation ==
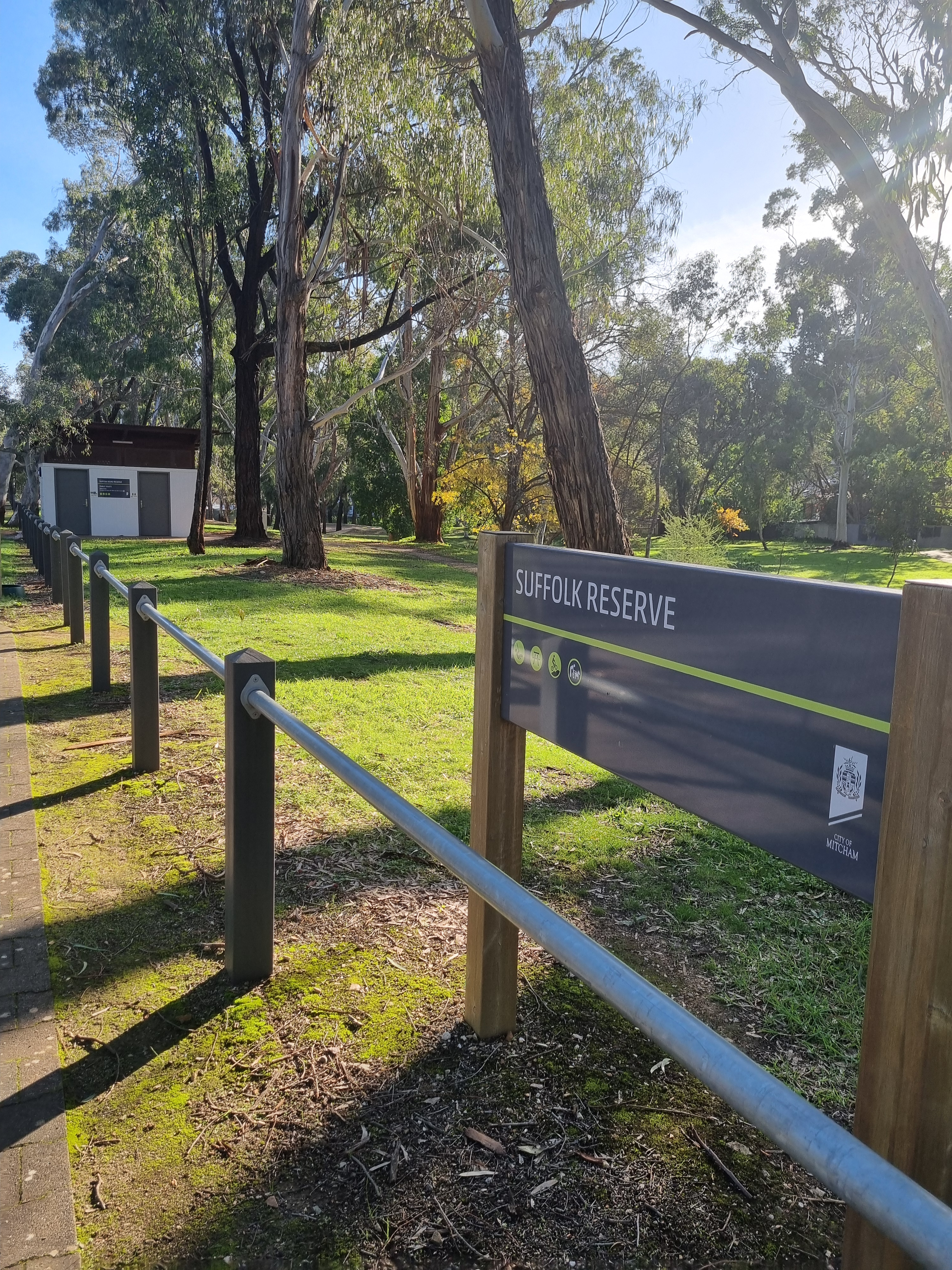
Suffolk Reserve

A football match at Hawthorndene Oval in 1947

Suffolk Road Reserve is a playground and junior dirt bike track in a natural bush setting. To support increasing community use the City of Mitcham constructed public toilets which were opened in 2026.

Apex Park has two tennis courts and a large, fully fenced family playground with shelters, barbecue and toilet facilities. Nearby is a BMX junior bike track and advanced dirt bike tracks.

Hawthorndene Oval is used for Cricket matches from October to March. A community change room facility was officially opened on 18 September 2026.

== Blackwood Forest Recreation Park ==
In 1908, the Government of South Australia acquired 20.8 hectares (51 acres) for use as an experimental orchard. It was planted with various fruit and nut trees by the Department of Agriculture and, in 1952, a small area was planted with radiata pines. In 1968, management was transferred to the Woods and Forest Department and, in 1972, the remaining fruit trees were removed and more pines were planted. However, by 1985, after community opposition to a plan to harvest the timber, the land was resumed and held as vacant Crown Land. After further opposition to attempts to dispose of the land, led by the community based Save the Blackwood Forest Committee, it was proclaimed a recreation park in November 2001.
