= Glenalta, South Australia =

Glenalta
- Suburb
- Coordinates: 35°00′36″S 138°37′23″E
- Country: Australia
- State: South Australia
- City: Adelaide
- LGA: City of Mitcham

Government
  - State electorate: Waite
  - Federal division: Boothby

Area
  - Total: 1.2 km^{2} (0.46 sq mi)

Population
  - Total: 2,039 (SAL 2021)
- Postcode: 5052
Suburbs around Glenalta
| Belair | Belair | Belair |
| Blackwood | Glenalta | Belair |
| Blackwood | Hawthorndene | Hawthorndene |

Glenalta is a suburb located in the south eastern Foothills of the Mount Lofty Ranges of Adelaide, South Australia. It is adjacent to Belair National Park.

In 2009, demographer Bernard Salt of the Sunday Mail judged Glenalta to be Adelaide's most liveable suburb, citing its "affordability, access and ambience".

== History ==
Prior to European settlement, the area was used by the Kuarna and Peramangk people for seasonal hunting and gathering.

The first European settlers in the area of Glenalta arrived in the 1840s, with the area named "Blackwood Vale Farm". The name Glenalta is derived from "glen" (valley) and "alta" (high), hence meaning 'a valley near a hill'.

In 1869, the Blackwood Inn (renamed the Belair Hotel in 1880) was opened by Robert Burfield, one of the earlier settlers in the area and a trustee of the Inebriates Retreat in nearby Belair. Burfield was killed in 1878 when his horse-drawn water wagon overturned on a bridge over Minnow Creek.

The suburb was initially divided in 62 allotments in 1926, then subdivided further in the 1950s and 1960s. In 1956 the Department for Education of South Australia bought two acres for Belair Primary School, which opened in 1958.

== Reserves and parks ==
Sherwood Drive Reserve is part of an open space corridor in Glenalta and Hawthorndene. It has a junior playground. Minno Reserve, Dunns Reserve and Glenalta Reserve provide walking paths and community open spaces. Belair National Park is accessed from Upper Sturt Road, the eastern boundary of Glenalta.

== Community facilities ==
The Catholic Church in Glenalta is dedicated to Our Lady of the Way.

== Transport ==
The suburb is served by Glenalta railway station on the Belair line. Bus routes 195, 195F, 196 and 196F operate to and from the city from nearby Blackwood Interchange, and routes 893 and 894 operate to and from Aldgate from Blackwood Interchange.

== Glenalta 100 Gathering ==
The Blackwood Action Group (BAG), based on the success of the 'Hawthorndene 100' event in the neighboring subrurb, hosted a 'Glenalta 100 Gathering' on the 4th of October 2026 at Minno Reserve.

More than 150 locals attended to hear speeches, music from the Blackwood Ukelele Group, and historical facts and anecdotes from long-term residents and dignitaries. The event reflected the community atmosphere of the suburb and its residents, and was followed by an afternoon tea.

Descendents of some of the original European settler families were present, and a self-guided history walk brochure was launched. Grant funding was provided by the City of Mitcham to support the event and to help with funding the publication of the walk brochures.

Glenalta locals enjoying the Glenalta 100 Gathering at Minno Reserve.
