= Mitcham, South Australia =

Mitcham
- Suburb
- Coordinates: 34°59′13″S 138°37′30″E
- Country: Australia
- State: South Australia
- City: Adelaide
- LGA: City of Mitcham

Government
  - State electorate: Waite
  - Federal division: Boothby

Population
  - Total: 1,832 (SAL 2021)
- Postcode: 5062

Mitcham, formerly known as Mitcham Village, is an inner-southern suburb of Adelaide in the City of Mitcham. It takes its name from the ancient Parish of Mitcham in Surrey, England.

== History ==
Before European colonial settlement the Adelaide plains, including the area now known as Mitcham, were owned and occupied by the Kaurna people.

In 1840 lots for purchase on Brownhill Creek were offered as 'Delightful Sites for Villas'. Created as a village on 12 May 1853 separate from Adelaide known as Mitcham Village, it was ancillary to a sheep station at Brown Hill Creek belonging to the South Australia Company. Prior to British colonisation, the area was inhabited by the Kaurna, an Aboriginal people. A group of about 150 Kaurna formerly camped at 'Wirraparinga', now Mitcham Reserve, known for many years as Brown Hill Creek reserve. The reserve area occupies what was used as the village green.

In August 1909, the Church of England's Orphan Home for Girls, established by Julia Farr and Mrs W. S. Douglas in Carrington Street in Adelaide city centre in 1860, moved to Fullarton Road, Upper Mitcham.

In 1915 the Australian Imperial Force (AIF) Mitcham Military Training Camp was set up at a 300 acre site that had previously been Grange Farm. This was the main training ground for volunteers from the 4th Military District, South Australia and Broken Hill. The camp was closed in 1919 by which time 33,000 volunteers had passed through Mitcham Camp before embarking for service overseas. 6,000 did not return. The site is now the suburb of Colonel Light Gardens and is a State Heritage area.

The Mitcham Local History Service is located at the Mitcham Heritage Research Centre in the Mitcham Cultural Village. It was established in 1986 to preserve books and documents on the history of the area and provide a service to the public, researchers and schools.

== Parks and Reserves ==
- Brownhill Creek Recreation Park
- Mitcham Reserve
- Randell Park Reserve
- Mitcham General Cemetery

== Governance ==
The suburb is the seat of the Mitcham Council.

Mitcham is located in the federal electorate of Boothby and the state electorate of Waite, which have been considered safe Liberal seats. Both are currently held by the Australian Labor Party.

== Notable residents ==
- Theodore Ambrose (1880–1947) medical practitioner
- Major Rupert Downes (1885–1945) surgeon and soldier
- Hedley Herbert Finlayson (1895–1991) conservationist and mammalogist
- John Harvey Finlayson (1843–1915) newspaper editor
- Laura Margaret Hope (1868–1952) medical practitioner
- Doris Egerton Jones (1889–1973) writer
- Ellen Thornber (1851–1947) schoolmistress
- Joseph Garnett Wood (1900–1959) botanist

== Gallery ==
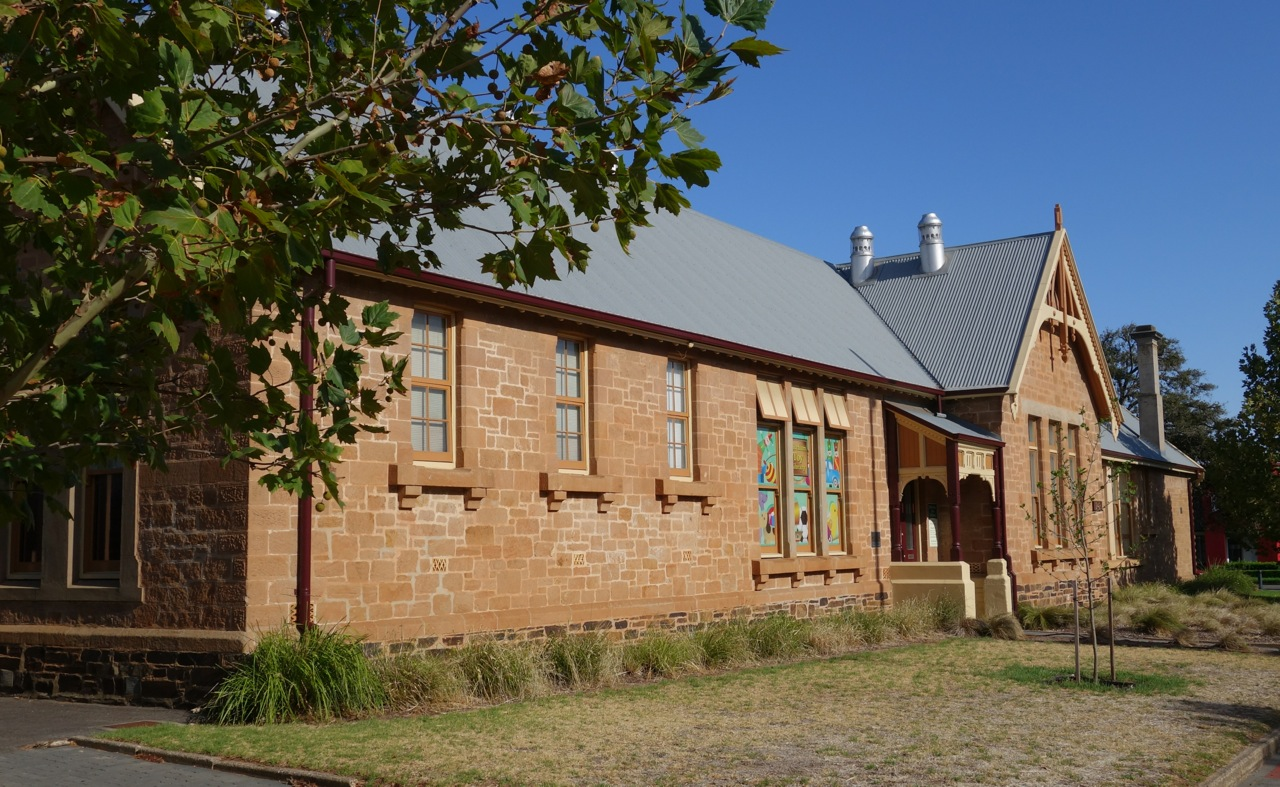

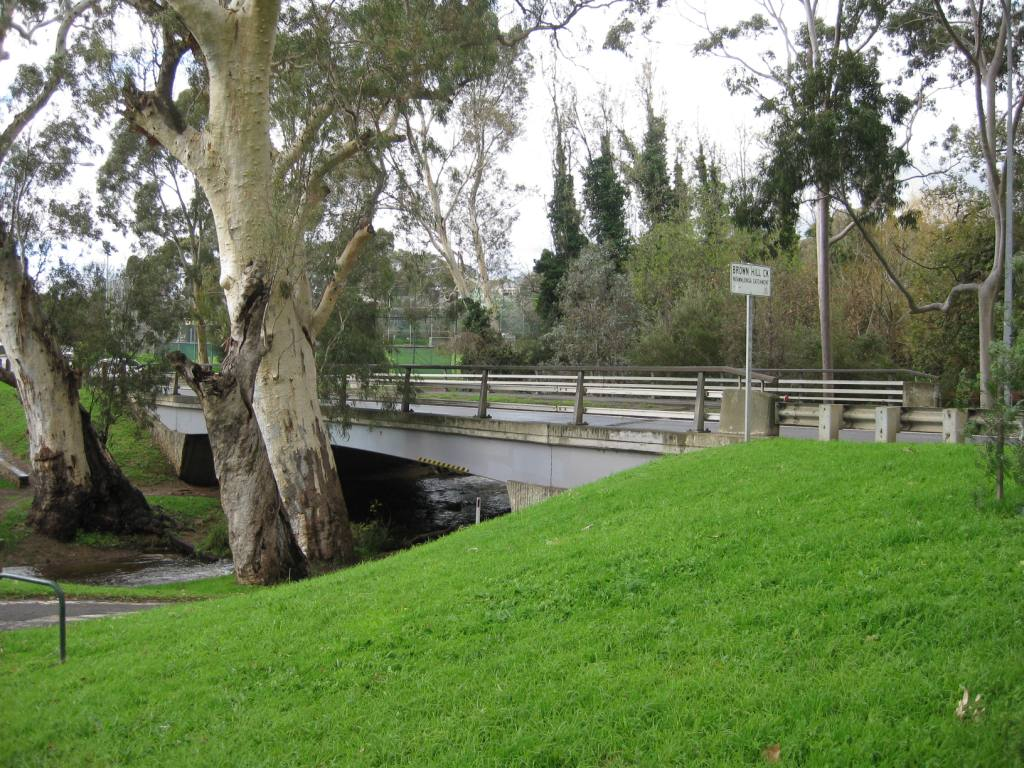

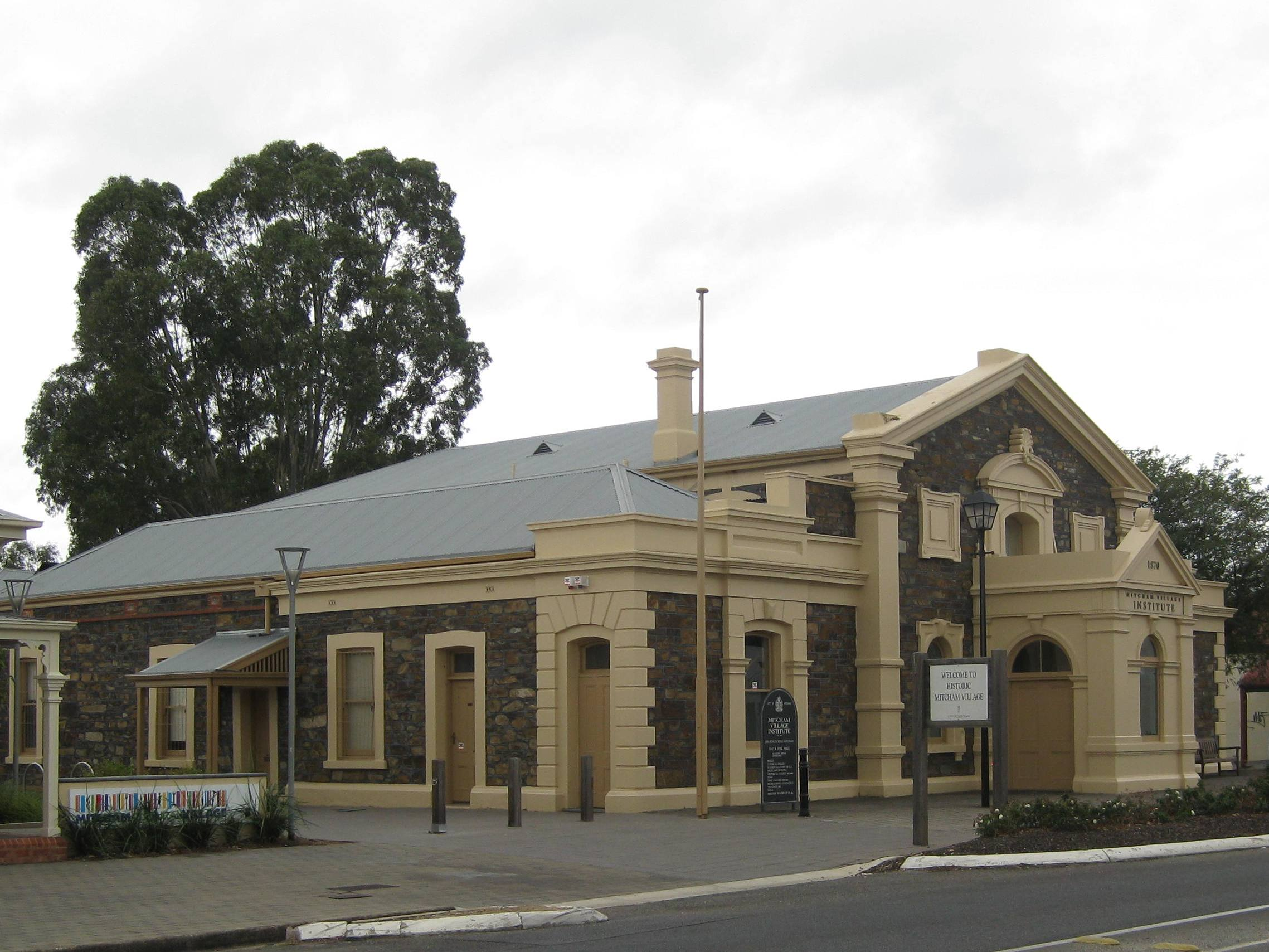

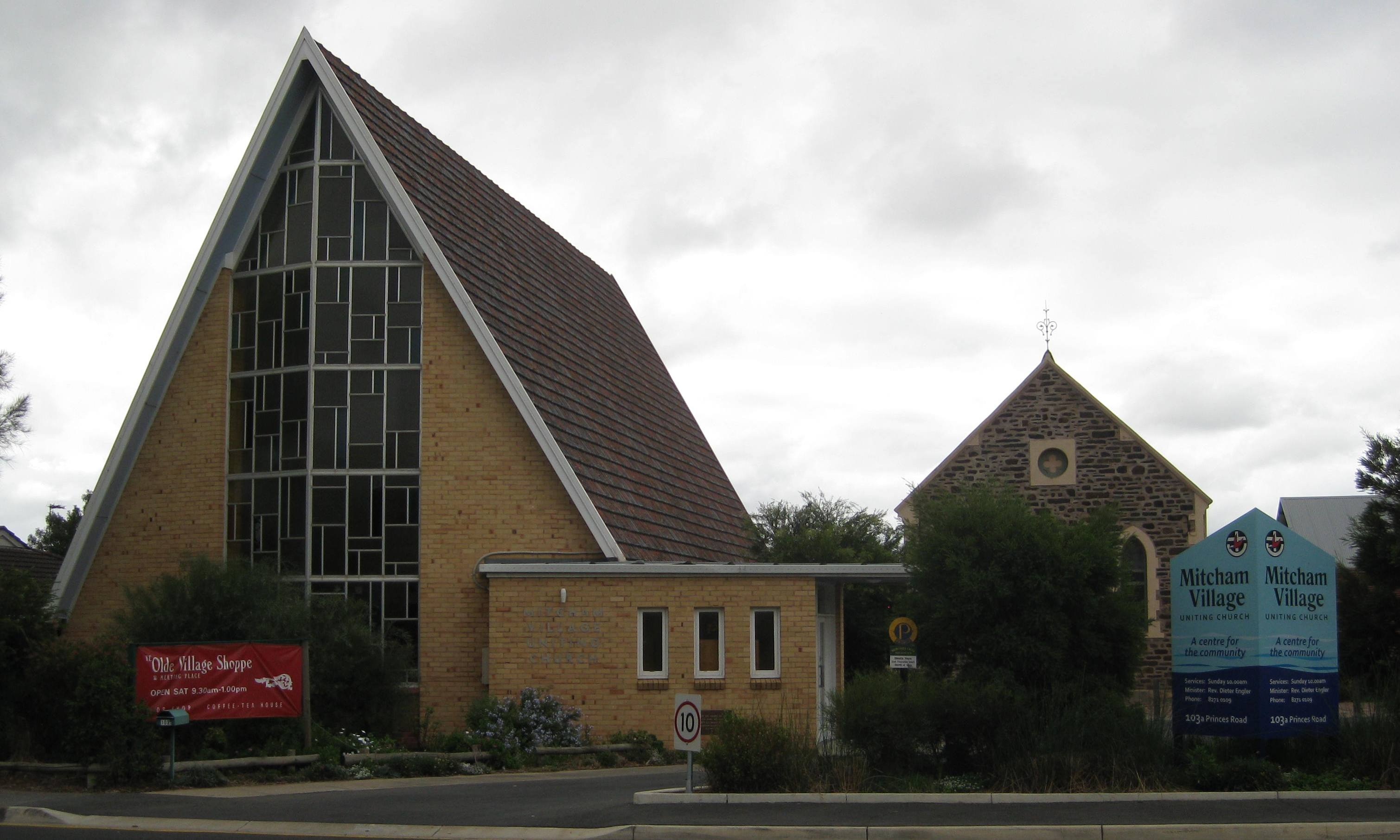

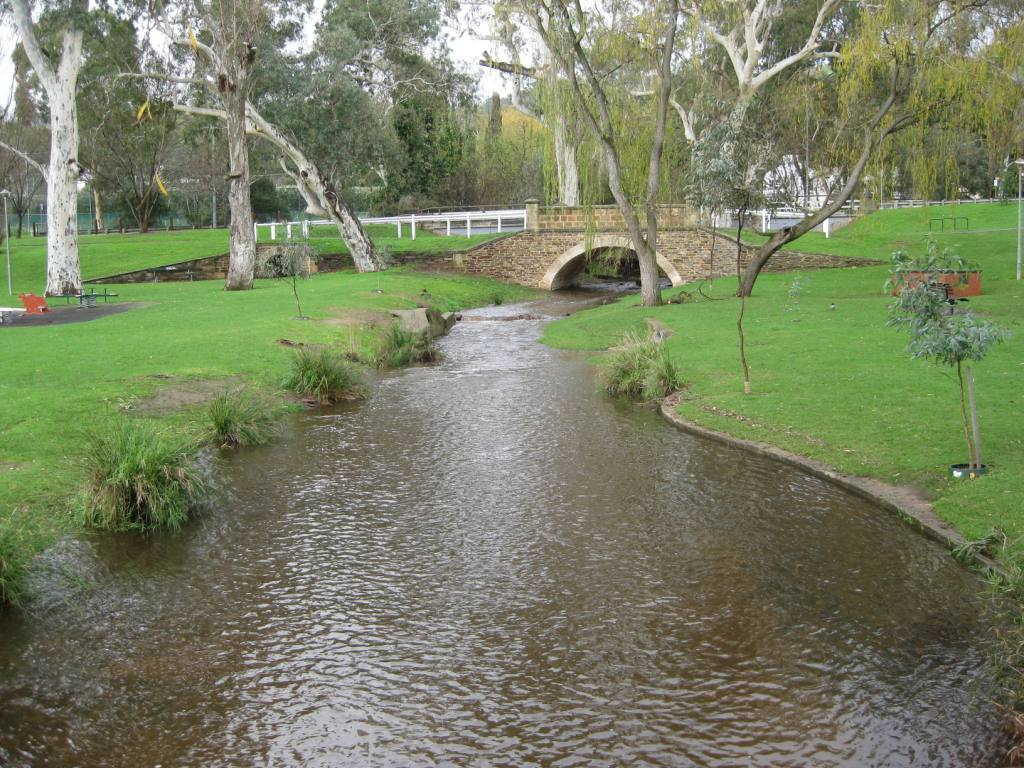

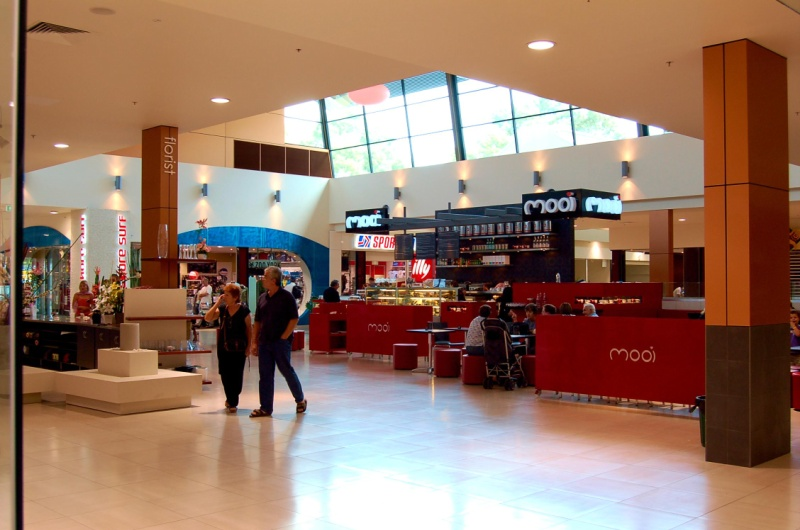
