= Blackwood, South Australia =

Blackwood
- Suburb
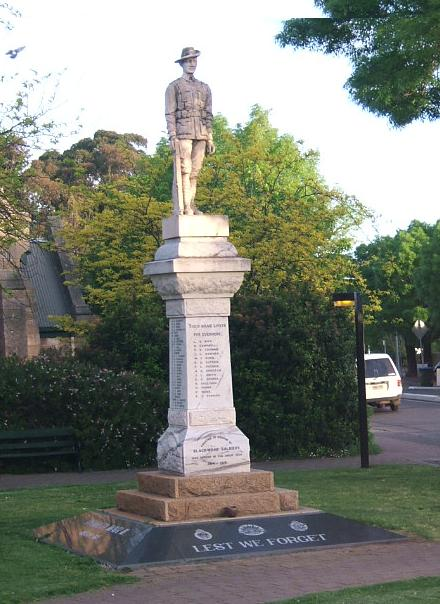
- Blackwood Soldiers' Memorial

- Country: Australia
- State: South Australia
- City: Adelaide
- LGA: City of Mitcham
- Established: 1879

Government
  - State electorate: Waite
  - Federal division: Boothby

Population
  - Total: 4,266 (SAL 2021)
- Postcode: 5051
Suburbs around Blackwood
Panorama	Belair	Glenalta
Eden Hills	Blackwood	Hawthorndene
Bellevue Heights	Craigburn Farm	Coromandel Valley

Blackwood is a south-eastern suburb located in the Adelaide Hills, South Australia. It is part of the local government area of the City of Mitcham.

== History ==
When European settlers arrived the plains and hills were occupied by the Kuarna people. They would move to the foothills during the winter months when the plains flooded with winter rain.

The name "Blackwood" most likely comes from either the Acacia melanoxylon, also known as the Australian blackwood, which grows in the nearby Mount Lofty Ranges, or the Eucalyptus odorata, which grows in Blackwood and has dark bark.

The earliest reference to Blackwood was a mention of Blackwood Vale Farm in 1847, though this is in present-day Glenalta. One of the earliest places named for Blackwood was the Blackwood Inn, which opened in 1869. In 1880 it changed names to the Belair Hotel. Belair Post Office opened on 3 April 1859 and was renamed Blackwood in 1881, when the Belair office was moved some distance away. The first land grants in the area had been made in 1840, and various churches were established throughout the 19th century, but most development in Blackwood didn't take place until the Adelaide to Aldgate section of the Adelaide–Wolseley railway line was opened, with Blackwood railway station opening in 1883. Land was subdivided for housing at about the same time and the railway line was later connected all the way to Melbourne.

The Blackwood Police Station was built in 1933. Mr Huxley was the first police officer.

The Blackwood library, opened in 1972, was named after a former Alderman and Mayor of Mitcham, Mr Ivor Symons. It was situated at the corner of Shepherds Hill Road and Brighton Parade. The first librarian was Mrs Mary Mills who supervised a staff of six librarians. The Ivor Symons Library moved to the corner of Main Road and Carr Street in 1981. It was relocated to Tiwu Kumanga Community Hub in 2023.

== Places of interest ==
Blackwood Soldiers' Memorial was erected in 1921 in the most prominent place in Blackwood: Five Ways corner. It is a place of Local Heritage, listed for being "a notable landmark in the area". In 1958 the roundabout at Five Ways corner was constructed.

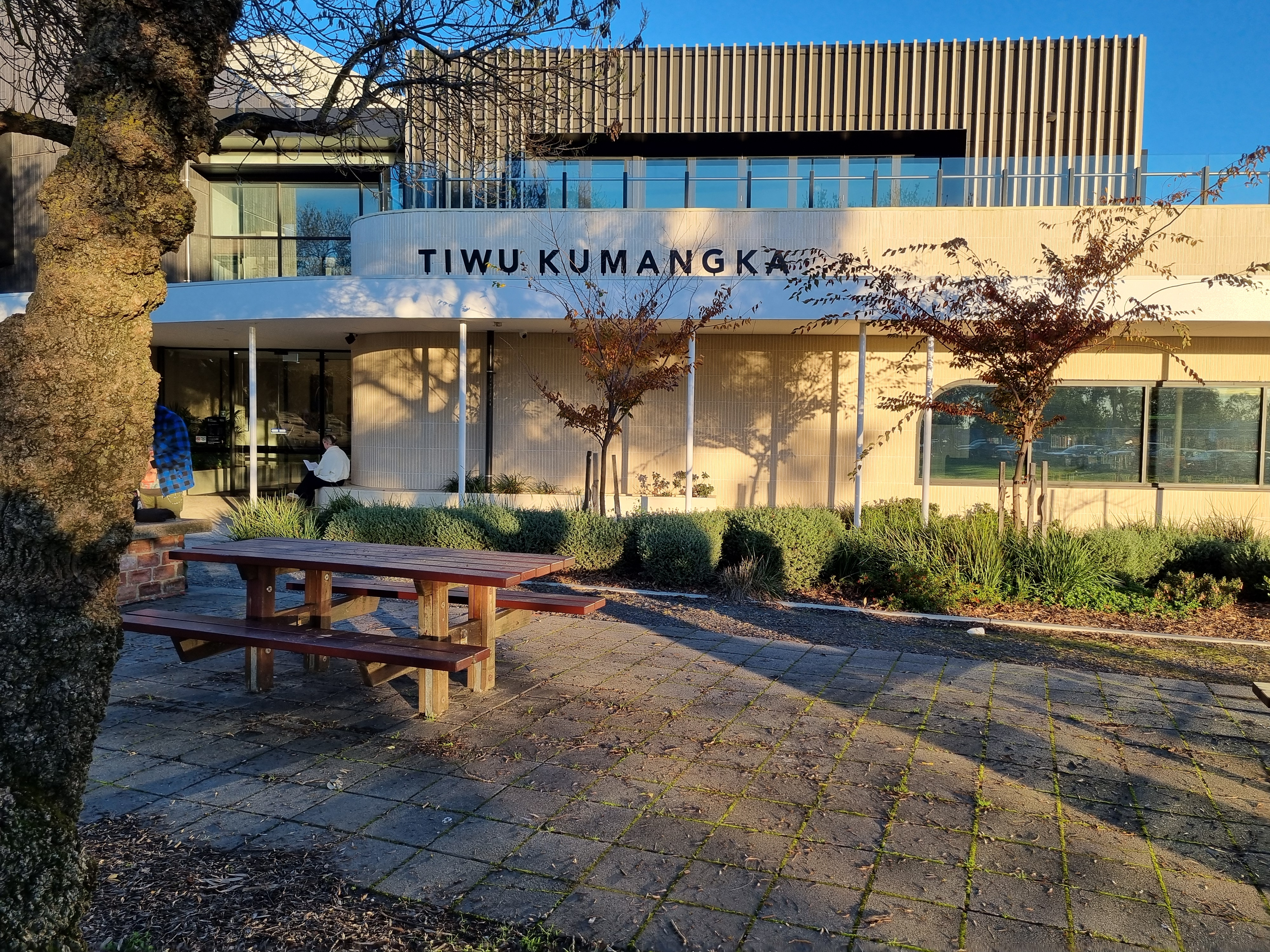
View from Waite Reserve of Tiwu Kumangka Community Centre and Blackwood Library showing the balcony next to the community hall.

The Blackwood Library, previously Ivor Symons Library, was re-located to Tiwu Kumanga Community Hub in 2023. The building materials are based on local natural features and "architectural details referencing the wide variety of landscapes within the City of Mitcham". The centre includes the library, study areas, a community hall, meeting rooms, quiet spaces and a community kitchen. In the Kuarna language Kiwu means Yellow-Tailed Cockatoo and Kumangka means coming together. The name references the "return of the vulnerable cockatoo after increased sightings in the Blackwood area".

Wittunga Botanic Garden, originally a private property with English gardens established in 1901, is located in Blackwood and features displays of Australian and South African plants.

Blackwood High School and Blackwood Primary School are located nearby in Eden Hills.

St Peters Lutheran School is also located on Cumming Street, opposite to the Blackwood Football Club oval, bordering the suburb of Craigburn Farm. There is diverse fauna in the park that wanders into Craigburn Farm including kangaroos, koalas and echidnas. Many waterfalls, creeks and gullies are also scattered and found throughout the area.

Uniting (former Methodist), Anglican, Church of Christ, Baptist, Roman Catholic and Lutheran churches are located in Blackwood, as well as Pentecostal churches including the Hills Christian Family Centre and Frontier Christian centre.

The Blackwood Freemasons Lodge was established on 1 May 1920, initially meeting in the Church of England Hall. In 1933, in the middle of the Great Depression, the masons started construction of a fine two storey building in 1930, with the foundation stone being laid by Past Master, James Burnside on 16 December 1933. The lodge building was opened by the Governor of South Australia, Sir Alexander Hore-Ruthven VC KCMG CB DSO (later to be Lord Gowrie, Governor General of Australia) on 17 March 1934. The official party included the Governor General, Sir Isaac Isaacs.

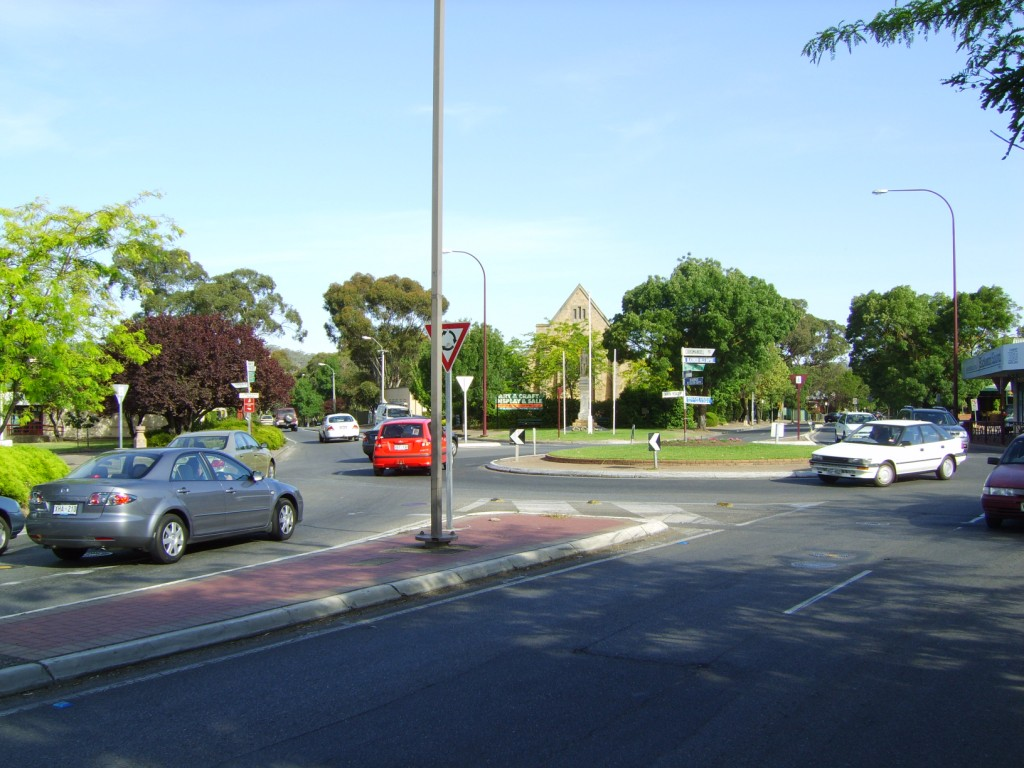
Blackwood Roundabout looking south-east, January 2012

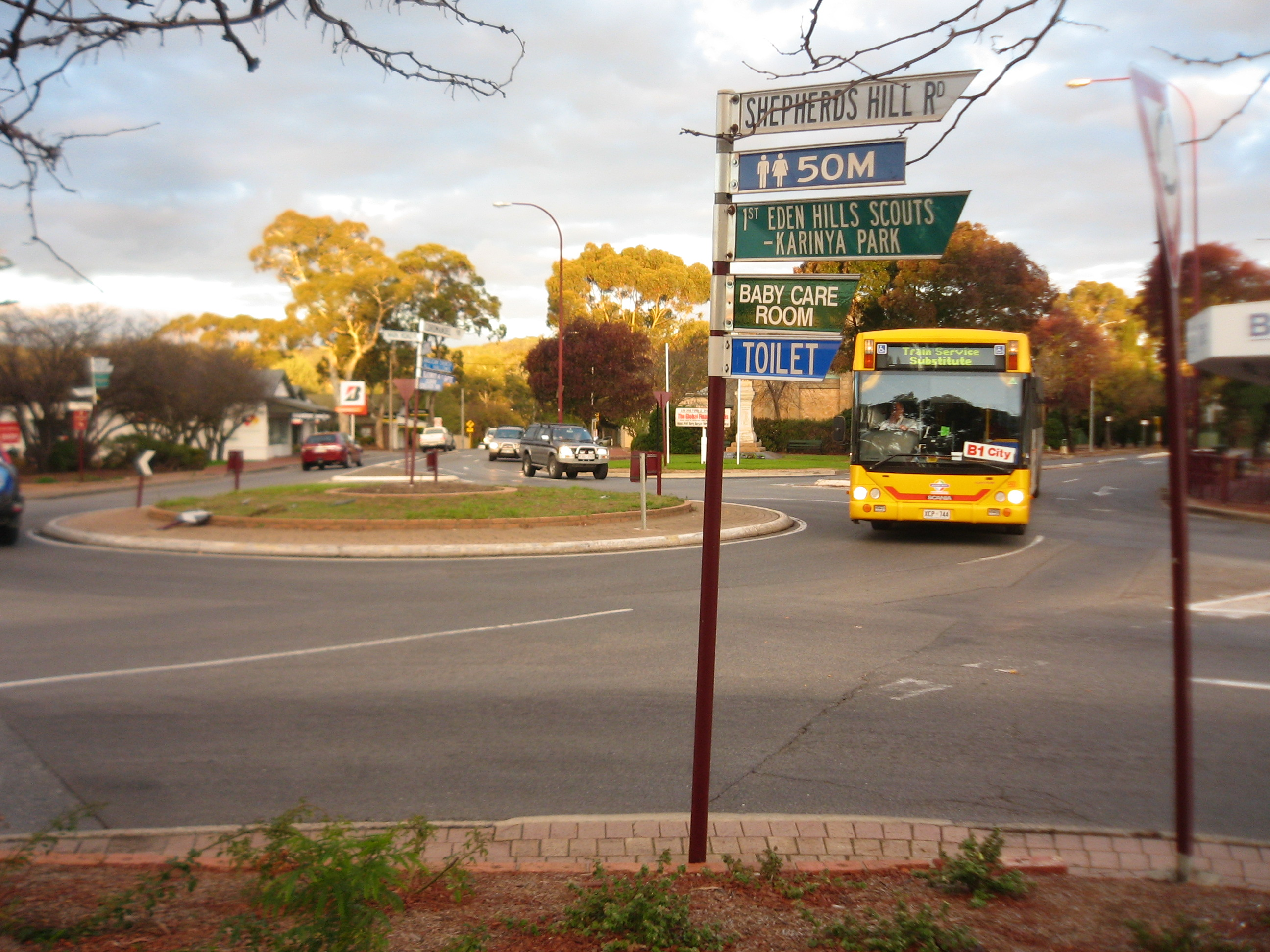
B1 train substitute bus at Blackwood roundabout

== Transport ==
Blackwood railway station is a transport hub with buses to Adelaide and the outer Southern suburbs, and trains to Adelaide and Belair.

== Media ==
The Blackwood area was home to the Coromandel (4 August 1945 – 13 August 1970) and its successor, the Coromandel Times (20 August 1970 – 18 March 1976), published weekly by the Blackwood Progress Association. On 22 January 1970, it changed from a Saturday to a Thursday paper.

It was also home to a regional publication, The Blackwood Times. The publication, first issued in December 1994, described itself as "a tabloid size, monthly newspaper, delivered free of charge to over 13,000 households and businesses in Belair, Bellevue Heights, Blackwood, Eden Hills, Coromandel Valley, Glenalta, Hawthorndene, Blackwood Park, Upper Sturt, Aberfoyle Park and Flagstaff Hill." Besides local news and events, it also contained information related to the activities of Mitcham Council. Its last issue was in June 2024.

Following the closure of the traditional print newspaper, digital platforms emerged to fill the community news gap, including an independent online initiative named Round About Blackwood. Established by a local creative studio Moore Foundry, the project functions as a digital newsletter and website that aggregates weekly event listings. Its coverage primarily focuses on regional community markets, neighbourhood notices, and local activities across Blackwood and nearby Adelaide Hills suburbs.

== Residents ==
The suburbs of Blackwood, Glenalta and Craigburn Farm had a combined population of 6,379 in 2,596 households in 2001. Norman Tindale, an anthropologist, archaeologist and entomologist, lived in his Blackwood residence "Kurlge" from 1955 to 1969. The hip hop group the Hilltop Hoods and country singer Beccy Cole (whose song "Blackwood Hill" references the suburb) are from the area. Blackwood Hill refers to the hilltop oval where the Blackwood Football Club (The Woods) are based. Award-winning screen composer and filmmaker Milton Trott grew up in Blackwood. Independent hip hop artist Allday also grew up in Blackwood.

== Politics ==
Blackwood is in the state electorate of Waite, represented in the South Australian House of Assembly by Labor MP Catherine Hutchesson, and the federal electorate of Boothby, represented in the Australian House of Representatives by Labor MP Louise Miller-Frost. Blackwood has a relatively high vote for the Greens when compared to the rest of its electorate and state,
