= Brownhill (surname) =

Brownhill is a surname. Notable people with the surname include:

- David Brownhill (born 1935), Australian politician
- Josh Brownhill (born 1995), English footballer
- Thomas Brownhill (1838–1915), English cricketer
- Thomas Robson Brownhill (1821–1864), English comedian and actor
