= Belair, South Australia =

Belair
- Suburb
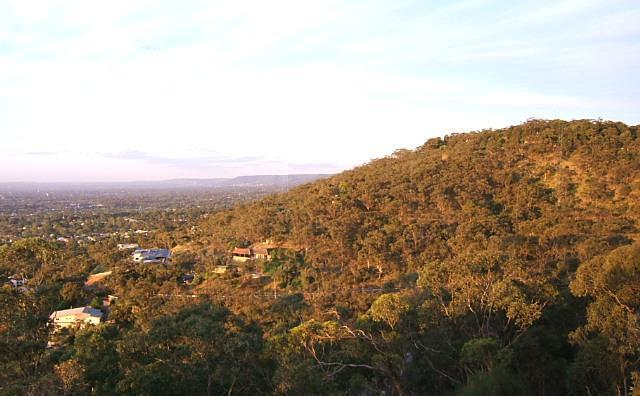
- Part of the view north from Windy Point

- Country: Australia
- State: South Australia
- City: Adelaide
- LGA: City of Mitcham
- Location: 10 km (6.2 mi) S of Adelaide

Government
  - State electorate: Waite
  - Federal division: Boothby

Area
  - Total: 14.58 km^{2} (5.63 sq mi)

Population
  - Total: 4,718 (SAL 2021)
- Postcode: 5052
Suburbs around Belair
Lynton; Torrens Park	Mitcham; Brown Hill Creek	Crafers West
Panorama	Belair	Upper Sturt
Eden Hills	Blackwood; Glenalta; Hawthorndene	Upper Sturt

Belair is a suburb in the south eastern foothills of Adelaide, South Australia at the base of the Mount Lofty Ranges.

== Name ==
Before European settlement, the Kaurna people called the area of modern-day Belair "piraldi". One early European name for the area was Sleep's Hill, named after Samuel Sleep, a shepherd who came to South Australia in the 1830s. The origin of the modern name "Belair" is uncertain. Gustav Ludewigs, who subdivided the area, may have named the suburb after Bel Air, Martinique, being his wife Maria's birthplace. Another theory is that it was named in 1849 after Eugene Bellairs, a Government surveyor who lived in the area.

== History ==
The area was used by the Kaurna and Peramangk people for seasonal hunting and gathering. The trees provided gum resin for food and bark for shelter construction, and possums and bandicoots were hunted for food and for their skins to be used in cloaks.

=== Government Farm ===
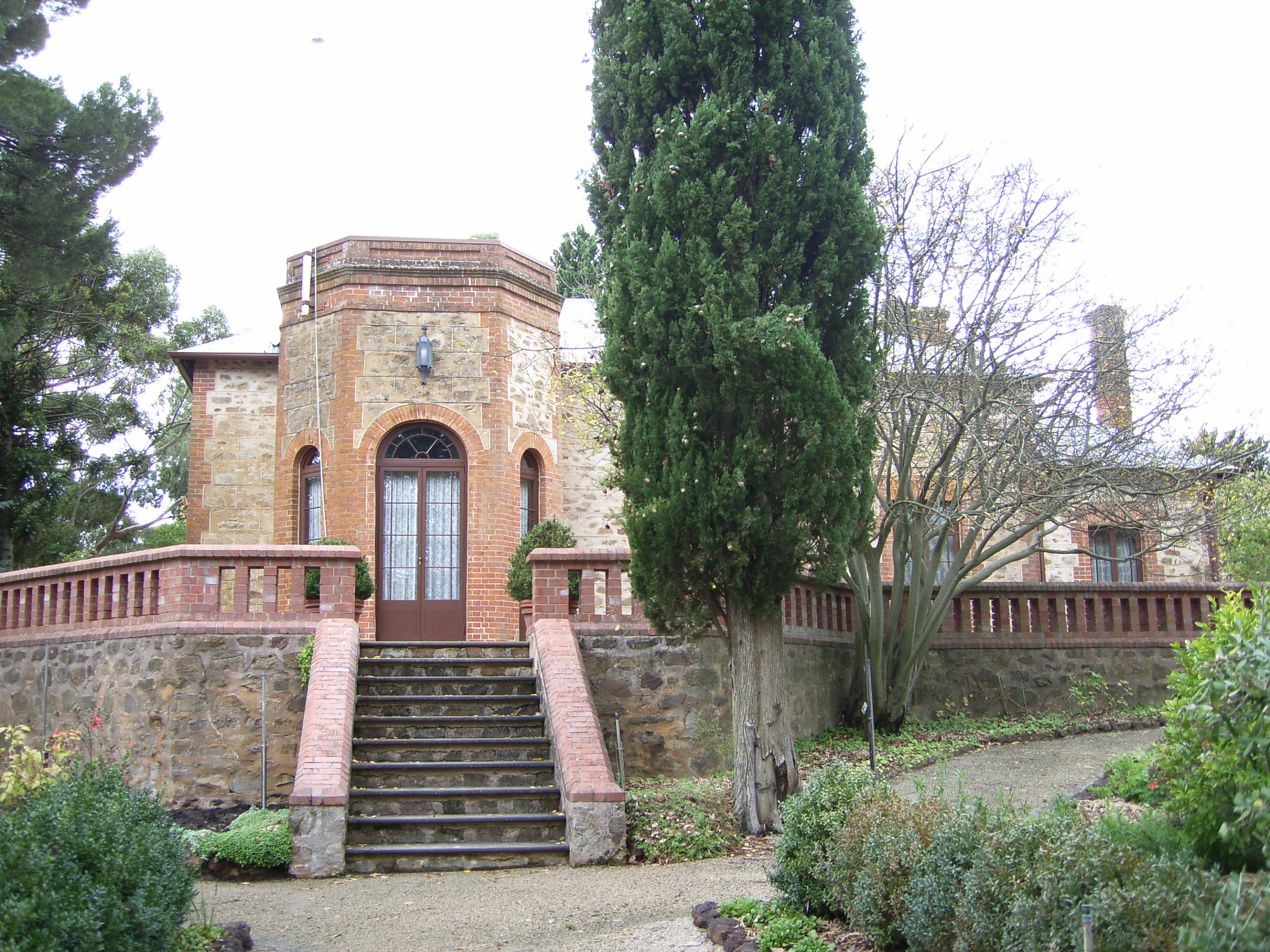
Old Government House

The first known European settler in Belair was a squatter named Nicholas Foott. Although he did not own any land, the colonial government allowed him to stay in the area and improve the land until the land was required by the government. Foott built a house on the land some time between 1836 and 1840. In July 1840, Governor George Gawler decided to establish a farm in the area named Government Farm, and Foott was asked to leave. From 1858 to 1860, Old Government House was built on the farm as the summer residence for the Governor of South Australia, which it remained until a new house was built at Marble Hill in 1880.

Two petitions, with 620 signatures between them, were presented to the South Australian Parliament in 1878 calling for a railway line to be constructed into the Adelaide Hills. The first petition desired a railway line so that both the rich and the poor living in the Adelaide Plains would be able to access the hills, viewed as the healthiest part of the Adelaide region. The second petition wanted a railway link to Port Adelaide so that produce could be delivered to markets in the hills at the same price as to markets in North Adelaide, which already had a rail link. After a survey of the Adelaide Hills, the Parliament passed a bill enacting a route from Adelaide to Nairne, which would pass through Belair. Construction work on the line began in 1879 and the section of the line through to Aldgate was opened on 14 March 1883. This included service to the Belair railway station, located in Government Farm.

In 1881, the South Australian government proposed subdividing the land of the farm to meet the increasing demand for land in the Adelaide Hills, but this was met with protests. This led to an Act of Parliament being passed in October 1883 prohibiting the sale of Government Farm without the sanction of Parliament. Further campaigns to protect the land during the 1880s, as well as the greater accessibility to the farm due to the construction of the Adelaide to Nairne Railway line, led to Government Farm being transformed into Belair National Park, proclaimed on 19 December 1891 with the passage of the National Park Act.

=== Later development ===
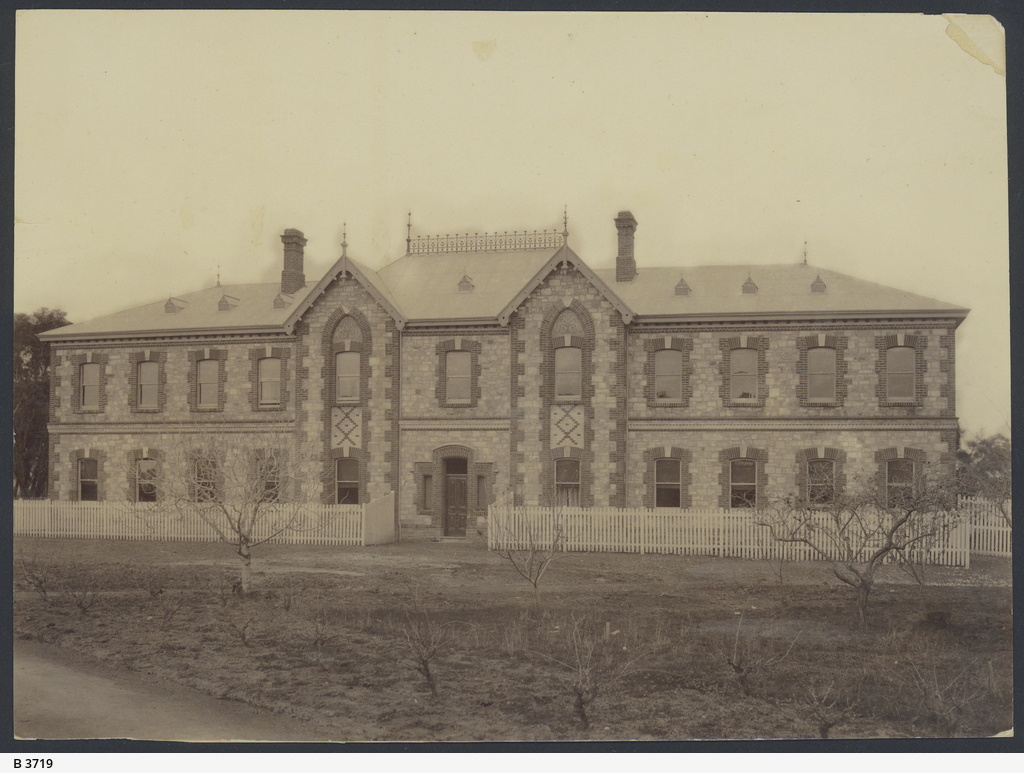
Belair Home for Inebriates, c. 1883

Belair was the location of the first facility for the treatment of alcoholism in South Australia, at the Belair Home for Inebriates. The retreat was partially funded by the government and opened in 1877. The building was renamed Hope Lodge in 1893 and operated as a training centre for missionaries until 1907, and is now part of the St. Johns Senior School campus. Belair was also home to multiple sanatoriums for people suffering from tuberculosis. Kalyra Consumptive Home was incorporated in December 1894 by the James Brown Memorial Trust, with its first patients admitted in February or March 1895. Another sanatorium called Nunyara Tuberculosis Sanatorium was opened in 1902 by Dr Arthur Gault, which operated until his death in 1917.

In 1915, quarries were opened at Sleep's Hill at the western end of Belair by Burt and Timms, who were contracted to build houses and roads in the nearby suburb of Colonel Light Gardens. Adelaide Quarries Ltd was formed in 1919 to better exploit the quarries, and by the 1950s the total production in the quarries had reached 7 million tonnes. In the 1920s, the Belair Progress Association was established to advocate for the development of Belair. They made efforts to stop blasting in nearby quarries and pushed the district council to repair Belair's roads. They also lobbied for Windy Point (then called Observation Point) to be set aside as a reserve, which led to the District Council of Mitcham acquiring the land in 1930. At this time, Belair was still a small country town with a population under 200. The population did not begin to grow until the late 1930s, when the population increased from 165 to 398 in three years up to 1940.

== Geography ==
Belair is located 10 km south of Adelaide's city centre. The suburb includes residential areas, but the majority of suburb's area of 14.58 km^{2} is taken up by Belair National Park, which has an area of 8.35 km^{2}. To the north, the suburb is bounded by the neighbouring suburbs of Lynton and Torrens Park, Randell Park in Mitcham, and the localities of Brown Hill Creek and Crafers West. To the east it is bounded by Sheoak Road and the eastern edge of Belair National Park. To the south it is bounded by Upper Sturt Road. To the west it is bounded by Laffers Road, Gratton Street, Neate Avenue, Gum Grove, Watiparinga Reserve, and the Belair railway line.

=== Parks and recreation ===
Belair National Park the second-oldest national park in Australia and the oldest in South Australia, established in 1891. After pressure from the Native Fauna and Flora Protection Committee, it was decided in 1923 that all future plantings would consist only of native species of plants. The facilities in the park include walking and mountain biking trails, tennis courts, and ovals with cricket pitches and Australian rules football goalposts. It is also home to Old Government House and State Flora, the oldest plant nursery in South Australia. Other reserves in Belair include Sleeps Hill Reserve, at the former site of the Sleeps Hill quarries and Sleeps Hill railway station, and Windy Point, which has a lookout over the city and coastline.

There are many shared use cycling and walking trails throughout Belair and the surrounding suburbs as part of Mitcham's Shared Use Trails network and Belair National Park. This includes the Randell Park Trails, the Lynton Reserve Trails (which goes through Sleeps Hill reserve), and the O'Deas Reserve, Saddle Hill and Ashby Reserve Trails.

=== Climate ===
Climate data for Belair (Kalyra) (305m ASL)
Month	Jan	Feb	Mar	Apr	May	Jun	Jul	Aug	Sep	Oct	Nov	Dec	Year
Record high °C (°F)	43.1 (109.6)	40.9 (105.6)	39.4 (102.9)	34.2 (93.6)	27.5 (81.5)	21.5 (70.7)	23.2 (73.8)	25.2 (77.4)	31.0 (87.8)	33.3 (91.9)	41.3 (106.3)	39.0 (102.2)	43.1 (109.6)
Mean daily maximum °C (°F)	26.7 (80.1)	27.0 (80.6)	24.2 (75.6)	20.3 (68.5)	16.5 (61.7)	13.4 (56.1)	12.5 (54.5)	13.8 (56.8)	16.1 (61.0)	19.5 (67.1)	22.6 (72.7)	24.8 (76.6)	19.8 (67.6)
Daily mean °C (°F)	20.7 (69.3)	21.2 (70.2)	19.2 (66.6)	16.2 (61.2)	13.3 (55.9)	10.6 (51.1)	9.8 (49.6)	10.6 (51.1)	12.3 (54.1)	14.8 (58.6)	17.2 (63.0)	19.0 (66.2)	15.4 (59.7)
Mean daily minimum °C (°F)	14.7 (58.5)	15.3 (59.5)	14.1 (57.4)	12.0 (53.6)	10.1 (50.2)	7.8 (46.0)	7.0 (44.6)	7.4 (45.3)	8.4 (47.1)	10.0 (50.0)	11.8 (53.2)	13.2 (55.8)	11.0 (51.8)
Record low °C (°F)	6.7 (44.1)	8.4 (47.1)	7.6 (45.7)	4.2 (39.6)	3.3 (37.9)	2.6 (36.7)	0.5 (32.9)	2.8 (37.0)	3.0 (37.4)	2.9 (37.2)	4.6 (40.3)	6.0 (42.8)	0.5 (32.9)
Average rainfall mm (inches)	24.4 (0.96)	24.6 (0.97)	30.8 (1.21)	58.2 (2.29)	93.2 (3.67)	100.9 (3.97)	97.5 (3.84)	86.8 (3.42)	73.5 (2.89)	58.7 (2.31)	40.1 (1.58)	34.0 (1.34)	724.0 (28.50)
Average rainy days	4.0	3.8	4.7	9.0	13.0	14.0	16.4	15.3	12.7	10.5	7.3	5.6	116.3
Average relative humidity (%)	46	46	47	60	69	76	77	71	63	58	54	51	60

== Demographics ==
At the 2021 census, Belair had a population of 4,896, up from 4,411 at the 2016 census and 4,390 at the 2011 census. Only 26 people identified themselves as Aboriginal and/or Torres Strait Islander people, making up just half a percent of the suburb's population, well below the national average of 3.2%. Belair is also an older suburb, with a median age of 47 compared with the national median age of 38. 89.6% of people only spoke English at home, and 75.0% reported that they were born in Australia. These were the most commonly nominated ancestries:

- English (47.3%)
- Australian (35.9%)
- Scottish (13.0%)
- Irish (10.7%)
- German (8.5%)

=== Religion ===
As of 2021, a majority of Belair residents don't identify with a religion, with 59.2% of residents falling into the census category of "Secular Beliefs and Other Spiritual Beliefs and No Religious Affiliation". The most commonly stated religious affiliations in the 2021 census were Anglican (11.1%), Catholic (9.5%), and the Uniting Church (5.9%). Churches in the suburb include Holy Innocents Anglican Church Belair and Belair Uniting Church, both on the same road (Sheoak Road).

== Transport ==
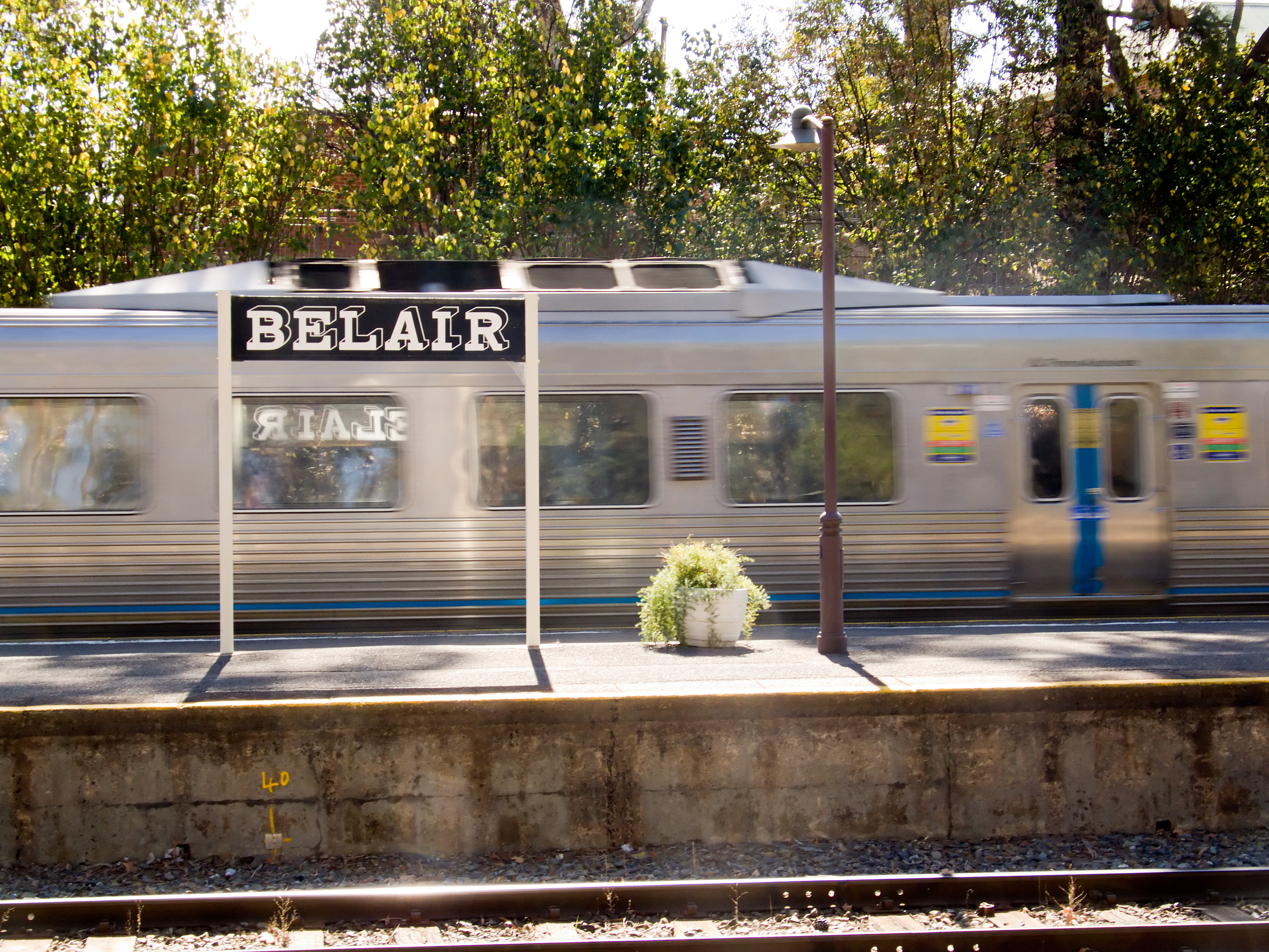
Passenger train arriving at Belair train station

The Adelaide-Wolseley railway line runs through Belair, with the Pinera and Belair railway stations being serviced by the Belair railway line, operated by Adelaide Metro.

The suburb is also serviced by regular bus routes, such as the 195, 196 and 197.

== Education ==
Belair falls within the catchment area of Belair Jean Bonython Kindergarten, which is in the neighbouring suburb of Glenalta. It is a preschool providing education for children aged 3 to 5.

The suburb includes Belair Primary School, which originally opened in 1957. Belair Schools used to include two separate schools: Belair Primary School and Belair Junior Primary School. The two schools co-located in 1997 and amalgamated into a single school in 2013. Since 2013 the schools have catered to students from Reception to Year 6. The school follows the IB Primary Years Programme, and it is a member of the Eco School Network.

There are no public high schools in Belair. The suburb is part of the catchment area for Blackwood High School in Eden Hills. The suburb does, however, include the private school St John's Grammar School, which teaches students from pre-school through to Year 12.
