= Brown Hill (Mitcham) =

Hill in South Australia

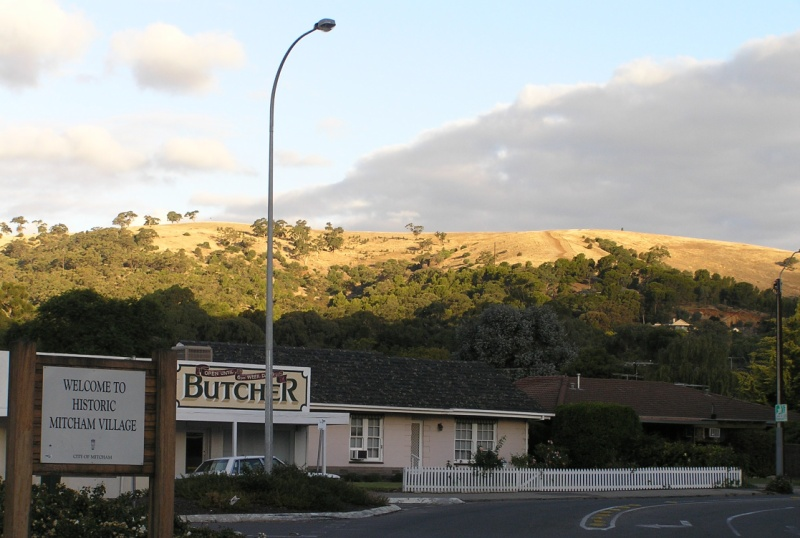
- Brown Hill viewed from Mitcham Village

Highest point
- Elevation: 312 m (1,024 ft)
- Coordinates: 34.985°S 138.637°E

Geography
- Location within South Australia
- Location: Brown Hill Creek, South Australia, Australia
- Parent range: Mount Lofty Ranges

Brown Hill is a hill in the Australian state of South Australia located on the western edge of the Mount Lofty Ranges, 7 kilometres (4.3 miles) southeast of the centre of Adelaide, in the suburb of Brown Hill Creek. Brown Hill rises to 312 metres (1,024 feet) above sea level.

Brown Hill, along with Mount Lofty, Green Hill, Flagstaff Hill and Black Hill, was used by Colonel William Light as a trig station for the 1837 survey of what is now the Adelaide city centre. Captain Collet Barker probably named Brown Hill when seen from Gulf St Vincent or in 1836 when in the Mitcham area.

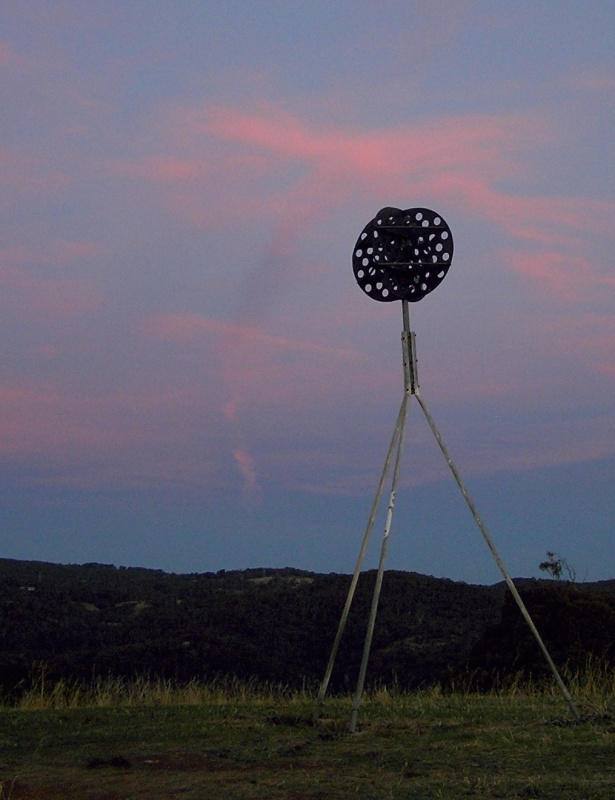
Brown Hill trig station

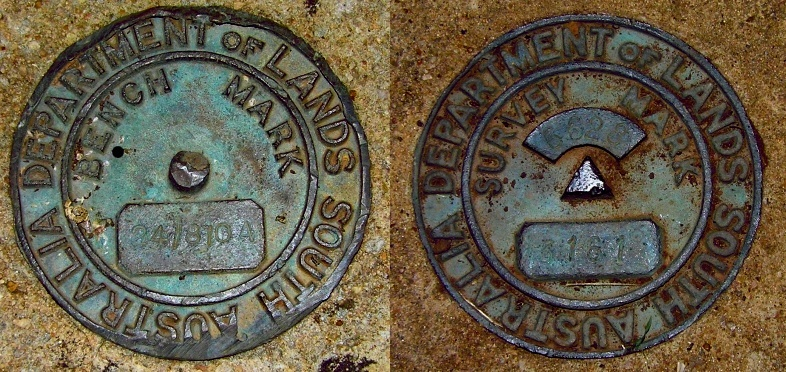
Bench and survey markers at the Brown Hill trig station

The hill was covered with grasses at the time of European settlement, probably due to the burning practices of the Kaurna people. Grazing of livestock since European settlement has resulted in loss of much of the native vegetation and the ingress of many weed species. In 1998, a 30 hectares (74 acres) site, including Brown Hill, was acquired by the City of Mitcham and established as Brownhill Reserve. A management plan was established to attempt regenerate the native flora and to control exotic weeds.
