= Brownhill Creek Recreation Park =

Protected area in South Australia

- IUCN category III (natural monument or feature)
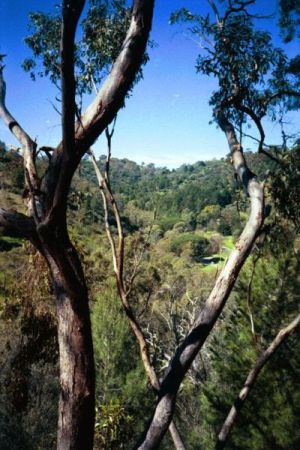
- View of Brownhill Creek

- Location within South Australia
- Location: South Australia
- Nearest city: Adelaide city centre
- Coordinates: 34°59′22.56″S 138°38′13.92″E
- Area: 51 ha (130 acres)
- Established: 15 July 1915
- Visitors: 30,000-40,000 (in 2003)
- Governing body: Department for Environment and Water
- Website: http://www.environment.sa.gov.au/parks/Find_a_Park/Browse_by_region/Adelaide_Hills/Brownhill_Creek_Recreation_Park

Brownhill Creek Recreation Park is a protected area located about 8 kilometres (5.0 miles) south of the Adelaide city centre in City of Mitcham along part of the course of the Brown Hill Creek. The recreation park was proclaimed under the National Parks and Wildlife Act 1972 in 1972 to "provide recreation opportunities for the Adelaide and eastern metropolitan region and to conserve remnant aged river red gums and the riparian zone habitat". The land previously subject to protected area status as a "National Pleasure Resort" since 1915. The recreation park is classified as an IUCN Category III protected area.

== See also ==
- List of protected areas in Adelaide
