= History of the City of Burnside =

History of area in Adelaide, Australia

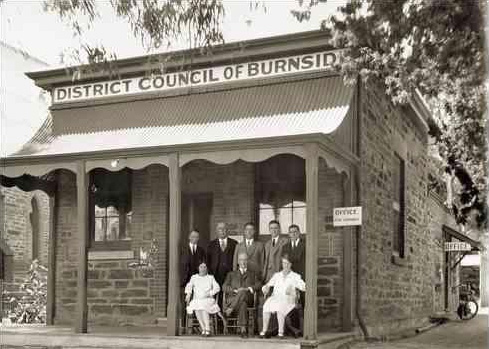
The Burnside District Council's old Chambers in 1928 (built 1869)

The history of the City of Burnside, a local government area in the metropolitan area of Adelaide, spans three centuries. Prior to European settlement Burnside was inhabited by the Kaurna people, who lived around the creeks of the River Torrens during the winter and in the Adelaide Hills during the summer.

Soon after British colonisation of South Australia in 1836, settlers began acquiring property in the foothills lying to the east of the city of Adelaide. The village of Magill was subdivided in 1838. A Scotsman named Peter Anderson, who with his family were the first official settlers in the area now known as the suburb of Burnside in 1839, named the area after his property's location adjacent to Second Creek (in Scots, "Burn" means creek or stream). The village of Burnside was established shortly after, and the District Council of Burnside was gazetted in 1856, separating itself from the larger East Torrens District Council. The mainstays of the early Burnside economy were viticulture, mining and olive groves. Glen Osmond boasted substantial mineral deposits, and vineyards were established at Magill and Stonyfell.

The present council chambers were built in 1926 in Tusmore; the council became a municipality in 1935. With strong growth and development throughout the region, Burnside was proclaimed a city in 1943. The 1960s brought to Burnside a community library and a swimming centre; both were further expanded and upgraded between 1997 and 2001.

== Early villages ==
The village of Kensington was established in May 1839, only 29 months after the foundation of South Australia. The village was primarily agricultural and had a close relationship with the nearby village of Norwood. The two villages formed one of Adelaide's first municipalities in 1853 as the Town of Norwood and Kensington, evolving into today's City of Norwood Payneham St Peters. Parts of Kensington that are now included in Burnside are the suburbs of Kensington Gardens and Kensington Park. The village of Makgill (later Magill) was first established as the 524-acre (2.1 km^{2}) Makgill Estate, owned by two Scots—Robert Cock and William Ferguson—who met aboard HMS Buffalo en route to the newly founded colony. It was named after Mrs Cock's trustee, David M Makgill. Ferguson, who was charged with farming the estate, built the estate's homestead in 1838. Soon after farming started the two were short of funds, and thus Magill became the first foothills village to be subdivided. The village of Glen Osmond was closely associated with the discovery of silver and lead on the slopes of Mount Osmond by two Cornish immigrants. Their discovery of minerals provided the colony with valuable export income, at a time when the early South Australian economy was not yet established and facing bankruptcy. South Australian Governor George Gawler visited the early discovery and the first mine, Wheal Gawler, was named in his honour. Wheal Gawler exported overseas throughout the 1840s, providing employment to early Cornish and then German immigrants after several mines were bought by a German businessman. The early village assumed a strong Cornish, and later a German character. Mining declined after an exodus of workers when a gold rush began in 1851 in the neighbouring colony of Victoria.

The Anderson family was the first to settle the land that was to become the village of Burnside, arriving in 1839. Peter Anderson named the property after its location by the side of Second Creek ("burn" means creek in Scots). They brought with them good character testimonials from Scotland, valuable farming experience and £3,000 (£330,000 in 2023); however, the farming patterns in Scotland differed greatly from those in the antipodes, and the family failed to adapt. The Andersons moved on to Morphett Vale in 1847, selling their land and abandoning their homestead. The buyer of the Anderson land, William Randell, soon decided to build a village in his new property in 1849. He hired surveyor and planner Nathan Hailes to lay out the new village. Hailes was both surprised and disappointed when he found that it had already been settled and left—especially since the growth and adaptation of European foliage to the area. The first villages to be established in the region, those of Glen Osmond, Magill and Kensington had existed for some time when the new village of Burnside was proclaimed. The new village was in a good position to grow; it was bounded by two major thoroughfares, Burnside (now Glynburn) and Greenhill Roads, and had the advantage of lying on Second Creek. The village was soon attracting residents; some of whom were wealthy Adelaide folk building an estate in the foothills, and others who were more concerned with working the land. The village was described in advertisements by Hailes in 1850 as "Burnside the Beautiful" with advantages of "perpetual running water, extensive and diversified view, rich garden soil and good building stone" offering a "direct, newly-opened and unblemished route to Adelaide".

== Establishment of district councils ==
The villages in what was to become the Burnside District Council were originally in the District Council of East Torrens, which covered 159 km^{2} (61 sq mi). East Torrens bordered the River Torrens in the north, the Adelaide Hills to the east, Mount Barker Road to the south, and the Adelaide Parklands to the west. The District Council of East Torrens was proclaimed on 26 May 1853 by Governor Henry Young under the provisions of the District Councils Act 1852. The Governor appointed five inaugural councillors as required by the Act: Dr David Wark, James Cobbledick, Charles Bonney, Daniel Ferguson and George Müller. Bonney, in addition to being a councillor, was the colony's Commissioner of Crown Lands. The councillors met for the first time at World's End Hotel in Magill on 12 June 1853. Initial plans were put in place to first survey and evaluate the council area and to collect licence fees and taxes as provided for by the Councils Act.

T. B. Penfold of Magill, a former captain, was to become the first District Clerk and Collector on 1 January 1854. On 4 January 1854 there was a vote in which ratepayers decided how much they would pay to the council (one shilling to a pound); it was decided to exempt charitable organisations, schools and churches from rates. In 1855 the population of the council area was 3,705, higher by a thousand than the adjacent Corporate Town of Kensington and Norwood. The huge East Torrens was not to prove as stable as Kensington and Norwood. Ratepayers were frustrated as to where their money was going; councillors did not have the administration or funds to operate effectively and the interests of the area varied widely. The area was split into three on 14 August 1856. The District Council of Payneham separated in the north-west of East Torrens, and the District Council of Burnside was formed by separation in a 15.9 km^{2} (6.1 sq mi) south-western portion of East Torrens. East Torrens council was further divided in 1858 with the secession of the District Council of Crafers.

== 1860s to 1900 ==
The new Burnside District Council held its first meeting at the Greengate Inn, Tusmore on 19 August 1856. Due to the time it took to elect new councillors, it was not until 29 December that the council met again. Dr Christopher Penfold, chairman, met the rest of the representatives there: Daniel Ferguson of Glenunga, Alexander Ferguson of Monreith, John Townsend of Magill and James Grylls of Belle Vue. It was during this time that Kent Town decided against becoming a part of Burnside and instead applied to enter the Corporate Town of Kensington and Norwood. The council was to meet at the Inn or at Ferguson's home right up until December 1869, when the first council chambers were built. However, it was still able to operate and fulfill its obligations under the Local Government Act 1852. These included the management of minor roads, the administration of abattoir licences and public houses, and the prevention of the spread of the noxious Scotch thistle. The council was also obliged, under a different act of 1851, to encourage education. Much road and bridgework activity happened after the council had been formed—early residents were amazed at the influx of development and construction that occurred. At the same time, the council was almost overwhelmed by the amount of work requested, and was forced to ask individual ratepayers for monetary assistance when building bridges in their area.

Much of Burnside's history has been observed and documented by institutions that have remained an important part of the lives of its residents: the school and the church. The first school to open in the area was in Magill during 1846, preceding a proper statewide education system. Magill Primary School was enlarged in November 1855, when 38 boys and 29 girls enrolled; they were taught reading, writing, arithmetic, grammar, geography, history, drawing and singing by a sole teacher. By 1865 there were two teachers. Glen Osmond Primary School was established in October 1858, preceding the Glen Osmond Institute, a centre for community debate and learning. Burnside Primary School was built in 1872, taking over from a small private institution. These primary schools, in the absence of proper libraries and similar institutions, received large collections of books and writings from the town's residents. Residents also took advantage of schools for frequent and heated debates on the future of the state and region, and these discussions often drew large crowds. However, even with this intellectual spirit, the adult population was still relatively disadvantaged in the sphere of education. The drive for learning continued until the Boer War placed more emphasis on physical activity and merit within society. Somewhat strangely, this development of learned activity was not replicated in Burnside's traditional centre near Tusmore, where the present Council Chambers, Community Centre and Library are located.

By 1871 Burnside had grown significantly; it was now a mix of villages supporting a modest population of 1,557. By comparison, Kensington-Norwood, though smaller in area, had grown to 5,132 persons. Glen Osmond, still affected by its immense growth following the expansion of mining, was the largest single population centre with 343 residents. The District Council had also constructed its first council chambers in December 1869, finally concluding the haphazard meeting agreement. Two villages, Beulah Park (North Kensington) and Eastwood experienced booms in population growth and development between 1870 and 1880, providing both housing to new immigrants and investments for the wealthy Adelaide Establishment. Parkside Hospital (now Glenside), a mental health asylum was constructed in 1866 to replace a crowded building in the Parklands. Built on beautifully tended grounds and with an elaborate façade, it was an early Burnside architectural monument. In 1881 Thomas Cooper started brewing South Australia's first branded beer, 'Coopers', at Leabrook. During this era, Stonyfell saw economic expansion as well; its large quarry changed hands in 1867 and the Stonyfell Olive Co was founded in 1873. The late 19th century was a significant time of development in Burnside. This development, however, was brought to an abrupt end in the last decade, the 1890s, when depression stuck the economies of Australasia after decades of reckless expansion, hitting Burnside hard.

== Early twentieth century ==
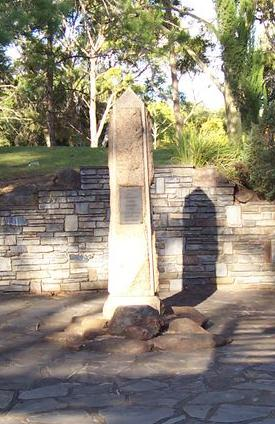
A Memorial Obelisk to Burnside's fallen in World War I, located in Hazelwood Park

By the turn of the 20th century, Burnside was becoming more urbanised. Paddocks were still scattered throughout the area but the villages were steadily growing. Toorak Gardens, Dulwich and other near-city villages were gazetted and made open to settlements and advertised now as suburbs, moving on from earlier times. By 1920, the District Council had a population of 17,000, living in 4,000 houses. Ten per cent of the £60,000 budget consisted of commercial enterprise payments, while the rest was made up of ratepayer fees. The South Australian Government had enacted more laws in relation to local government, in particular, the Town Planning Act 1920 and the Building Act 1923. These assigned more responsibility to councils, but at a time of necessity; Adelaide was gradually expanding. Burnside councillors advised the State Government to acquire and manage pleasure resorts; a kiosk was opened at Waterfall Gully and the Morialta Conservation Park established on this advice. Burnside was treated with high regard by Adelaide newspapers in response to its elaborate greening and tree planting schemes. The council was preserving old trees and planting approximately 500 a year. A Burnside councillor, HES Melbourne, was adored in this period; he spent his own money acquiring reserves and land for residents due to a lack of funds during the Great Depression. He presided over lean but reasonable budgets and oversaw the planting of trees and foliage to beautify the city. Gordon Allen, a local resident who succeeded Melbourne as a councillor, described Melbourne: "No Council ever had a better man." Melbourne also oversaw the building of the Mount Osmond golf course, but his vision of constructing a Country Club was never realised.

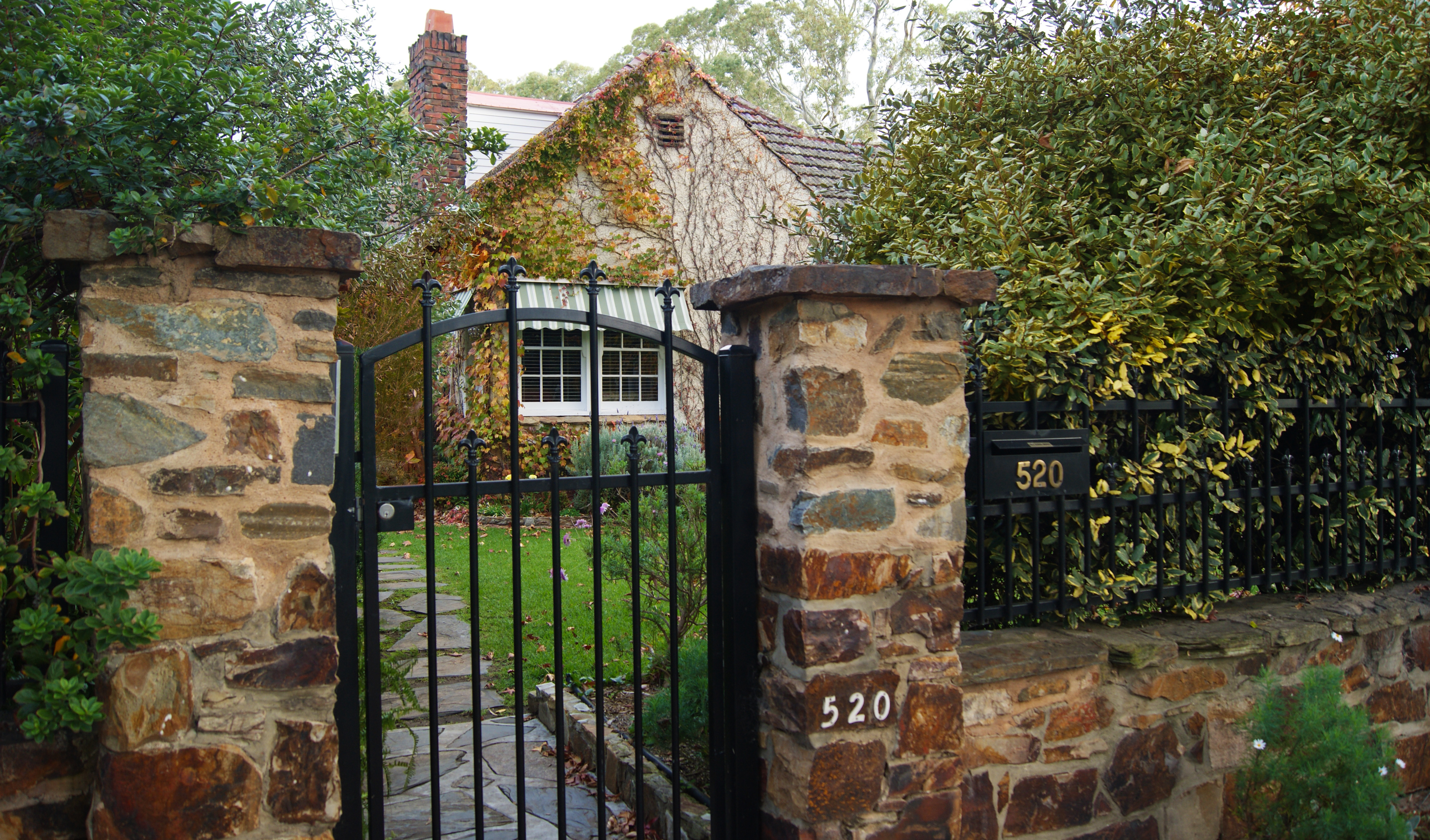
Gated postwar home in Burnside

Development restrictions preceding the Hills Face Zone were established in the 1920s; the council was obligated to adhere to strict guidelines. 1928 saw the building of grand new Council Chambers at the corner of Greenhill and Portrush Roads; they are still in use today. Floods devastated Waterfall Gully in 1931. Burnside continued to grow; in 1935 the District Council of Burnside became the Municipality of Burnside. By 1941, only 401 acres (1.6 km^{2}) remained under cultivation.

== Post-war to 1970s ==
In 1945, much of the area that formed Cleland Conservation Park (expanded and upgraded to Cleland National Park in November 2021) was purchased by the State Government, in large part because of the lobbying efforts of Professor Sir John Cleland. Most of this land, including the Waterfall Gully area, was later combined in 1963 to create the park that extends eastwards up into the hills to the summit of Mount Lofty and northwards to Greenhill Road. During 1943, the Municipality of Burnside was proclaimed the City of Burnside.

Many of Burnside's sons fought in World Wars I and II; on their return they were honoured with memorials, and in particular, the name of Burnside's first community hospital. The Burnside War Memorial Hospital was opened in April 1949 in Toorak Gardens, built in a house donated by a local resident, Otto van Reiben. The present name was adopted in 1956. Memorials to the fallen can be found all over Burnside; in Hazelwood Park opposite the swimming centre, at schools and churches, in reserves. Like much of Australia, Burnside held true to the phrase "Lest We Forget", which is emblazoned on many of the community-erected memorials. In Rose Park on Alexandra Avenue, there is a large monument and statue of an Australian Imperial Force soldier with its plaque stating: "In Memory of the Fallen: World War II, Korea, Vietnam". Upon their arrival home the servicemen formed several Returned Services League clubs in the City of Burnside.

When Australia celebrated the Golden Jubilee of the Federation of Australia in 1951, Burnside residents joined in the celebrations, and in 1956 commemorated the centennial of their own town. A post-war economic and baby boom under the Playford Government saw Burnside grow at a spectacular rate; from a population of 27,942 in 1947, it grew to 38,768 in 1961. As suburbs devoured the remaining paddocks, 1953 saw the building of a public ballroom, 1965 saw an Olympic Grandstand; both in Kensington Park. In 1963 the Cleland Conservation Park was founded on Burnside's eastern borders.

Burnside's road system was completely bitumenised during the 1960s and 1970s through government-sponsored roadworks programmes. Plans were also laid out to replace the winding and dangerous Mount Barker Road. One of these proposals was the Burnside-Crafers Highway, which was strongly supported by council; it envisaged leaving Greenhill Road once reaching Hazelwood Park. It was then to pass through Hazelwood Park and Beaumont, wind around the hills of Waterfall Gully and then go over Eagle on the Hill to meet Crafers. The Burnside Council put much effort into this proposal, widening Linden Avenue (which runs north-west to south-east) in preparation for the highway. The proposal was eventually rejected in favour of upgrading Mount Barker Road and Linden Avenue remained a huge out-of-place road running through an otherwise peaceful suburb.

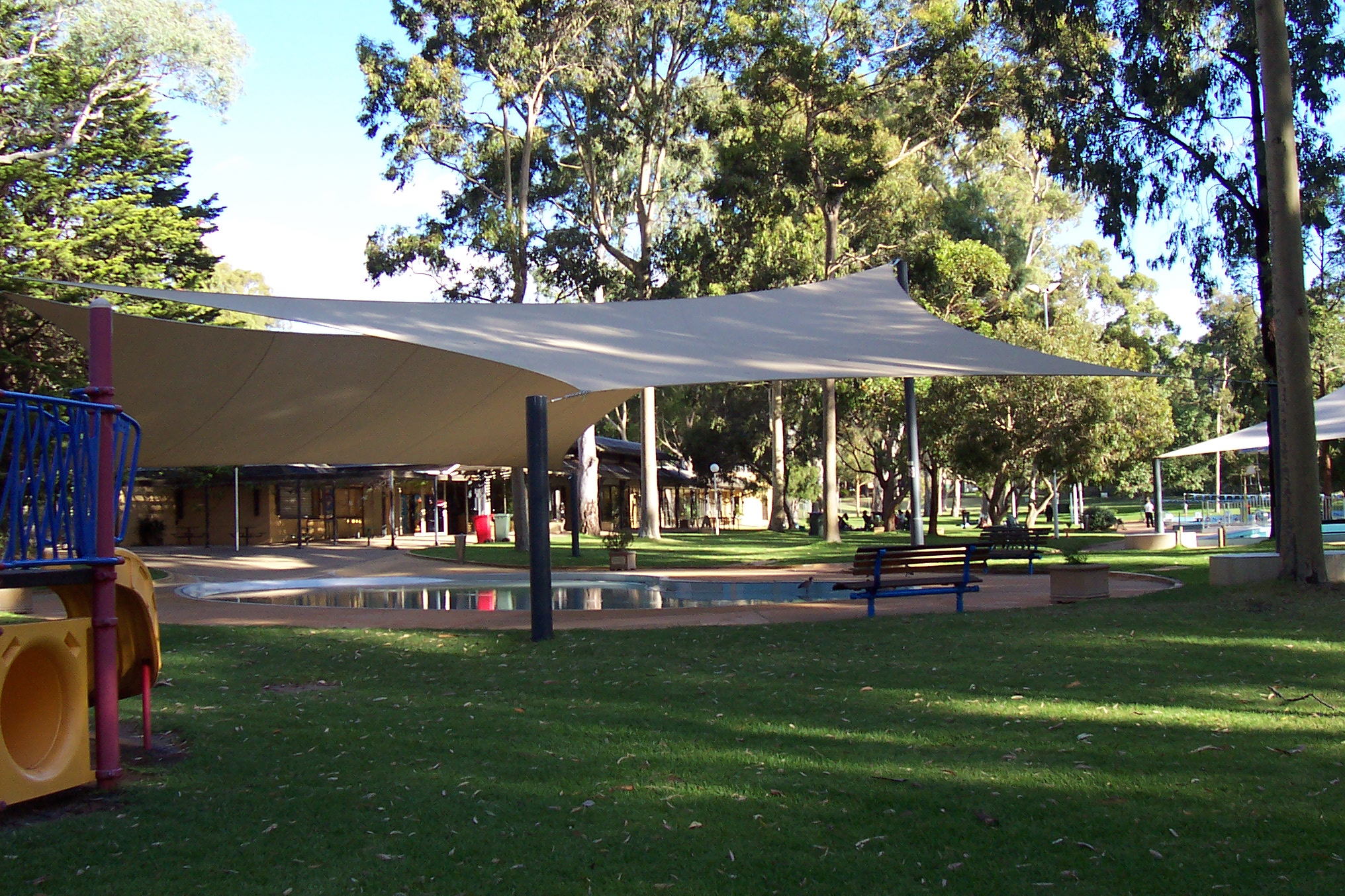
The swimming centre in Hazelwood Park

Burnside gained a public library with a collection of 7,800 books in 1961 after it was first suggested in February 1959; the cost of establishing a library for the residents was more affordable since the Libraries Act 1955 had been passed. The Burnside Swimming Centre opened in 1966; the swimming centre was a pet project of then-Mayor George Bolton, who had a grand vision of what he wanted Hazelwood Park, where the centre was to be located, to become. Bolton met unprecedented public opposition in 1964 when the idea was first unveiled. The substantial elderly population of Burnside (15%) was wholly opposed to the idea, suggesting the influx of troublemakers and noise was hardly worth the effort. The cost was estimated at £75,000 (A$2,360,000 as of 2022). While architects were resigning over the scale of the proposed development and a number of residents were up in arms, the Adelaide newspapers had a ball; cartoonists throughout 1964 spent many of their daily cartoons covering the debacle. With the failure of a poll to decide the fate of the idea on 24 March the Sunday Mail published the headline "Burnside Says NO to Swim Pool". Mayor Bolton was not dismayed by the result; he pushed ahead with his idea and announced new plans in December. After a strong public campaign and minor changes to the project a poll in February 1965 voted strongly in favour of the idea. The Mayor had won his battle and it was named the George Bolton Swimming Centre in his honour upon opening.

The Burnside Council decided on an ambitious goal in 1967: for every 1,000 in population, five hectares of reserves were to be set aside. Setting out to achieve this the council purchased Hazelwood Park from the State Government, the control of Beaumont Common was obtained by a 1973 amendment to the Local Government Act and parts of Mount Osmond were attained from the Highways Department. Before coming into the ownership of the council, Hazelwood Park was destined to be subdivided under a government initiative. When council heard of this, motions were put into place to take ownership and the deed was transferred in 1964. The council managed this only after discussions were held with Premier Thomas Playford IV.

== 1980s to 2010s ==
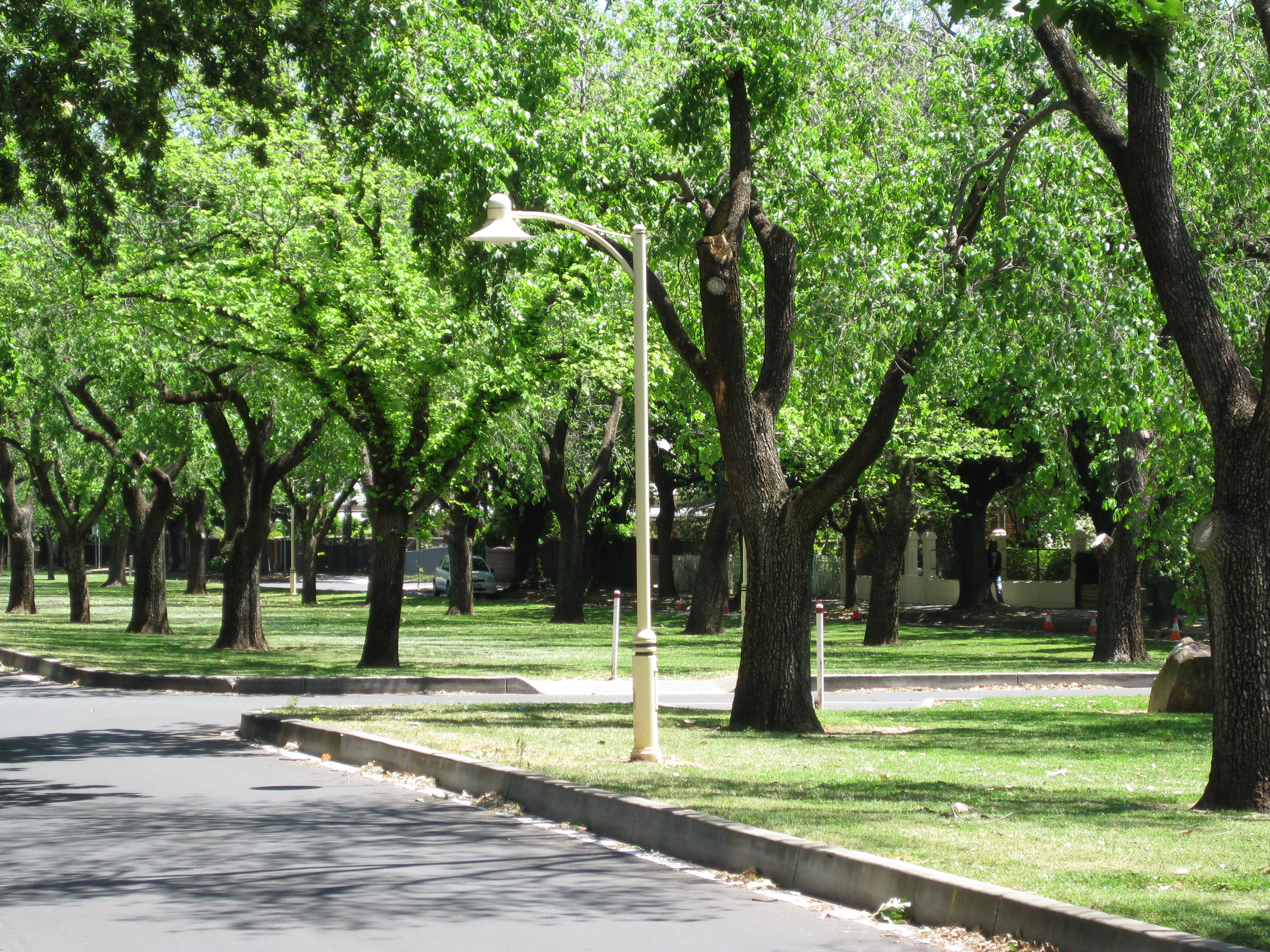
Alexandria Avenue, Rose Park

A community centre was built alongside the council chambers in 1982, adjoining the library. The entire council complex was upgraded first in 1996, together with an upgrade of the Burnside Swimming Centre. Further upgrades took place in 2001, resulting in a modern library and community centre for residents.

Burnside developed a new council logo in 1993, utilising the colours of green and purple. Green represented the lush parks and reserves in Burnside, and purple represented the prominent Jacaranda trees.

The easterly adjacent Adelaide Hills suburbs of Skye and Auldana were merged into Burnside in 1999. Coopers Brewery moved out of Leabrook in 2001, relocating to Regency Park. The former premises of Coopers was converted into a retirement village.
