= Mount Osmond, South Australia =

Mount Osmond
- Suburb
- Country: Australia
- State: South Australia
- City: Adelaide
- LGA: City of Burnside
- Location: 5 km (3.1 mi) from Adelaide

Government
  - State electorate: Bragg
  - Federal division: Sturt

Population
  - Total: 464 (SAL 2021)
- Postcode: 5064
Suburbs around Mount Osmond
St Georges	Beaumont	Burnside
Glen Osmond	Mount Osmond	Waterfall Gully
Urrbrae	Leawood Gardens	Waterfall Gully

Mount Osmond is a small suburb of 2,497 people in the South Australian capital city of Adelaide. It is part of the City of Burnside local government area and located in the foothills of the Adelaide Hills, five kilometres southeast of the city centre. The suburb is high on the hill of the same name, which is the last hill on the right when approaching Adelaide down the South Eastern Freeway before the road levels out onto the Adelaide Plains. It is bounded to the north by the suburb of Beaumont, to the north-east by Burnside, to the east by Waterfall Gully, to the south by Leawood Gardens/Eagle On The Hill, to the south-west by Urrbrae, to the west by Glen Osmond and to the north-west by St Georges.

The suburb is at a high elevation in the Mount Lofty Ranges, and provides views over Adelaide as well as containing a renowned golf course and country club. Mining operations in the 19th century gave the area notoriety, but it has since developed slowly into a small, quiet and secluded suburb.

== History ==
=== Aboriginal culture ===
Mount Osmond ưas within the traditional lands of the Kaurna people, and forms part of the Mount Lofty Ranges and is therefore part of the Dreamtime story of the ancestor-creator Nganno. According to the legend, Nganno was wounded in a battle and laid down to die, forming the Mount Lofty Ranges.

=== European settlement ===
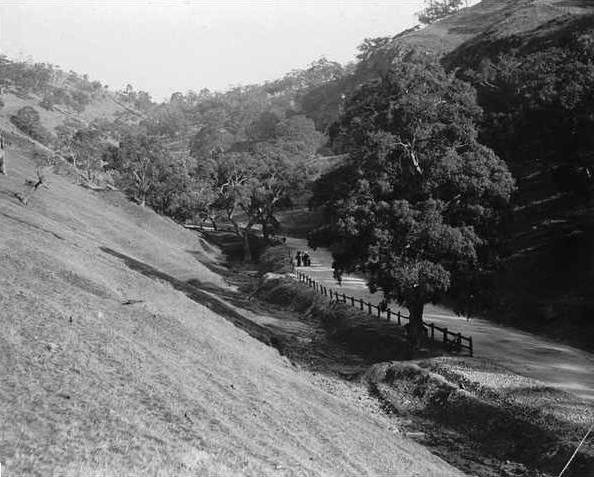
Mount Barker Road, 1900

When Adelaide was first planned and mapped out by Col. William Light, Mount Osmond received the three allotments 1070, 1277 and 1278. While much of Adelaide was relatively quickly bought (but not necessarily settled) Mount Osmond did not enjoy any early buyers. The first reported activity in the area was after the mining rush of Glen Osmond due to the Wheal Watkins and Wheal Gawler mines. Lot 1277 yielded a mine in Slaughterhouse Gully but it was worked only briefly. Subsequent finds of bluestone proved fruitful and the mineral was extracted until 1900, when mining ended and the last of the mines were either filled in or cordoned off.

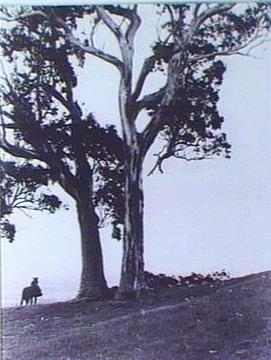
A horse and rider on Mount Osmond, 1930

Developers eventually bought the lots that composed Mount Osmond but once again interest in the suburb was minor. Attempts to bring in settlers culminated in the construction of Mount Osmond Road in 1882. It wound around the hills from where it began as an offshoot of Mount Barker Road in the South. Developers broke down the three large lots into roughly two hundred 1-acre (4,000 m^{2}) ones in the hope of sales. A few lots were sold to quarrymen and gardeners around Mount Barker Road, but the vast remainder was leased to stockowners as pasture for their livestock. Much of Mount Osmond, along with a large portion of the surrounding area, was bought in 1907 by Ernest C. Sanders. His family made great use of the land, with his sons building houses on the vast property while raising sheep and growing hay. Considerable time was spent by the Sanders family in naming and mapping the area.

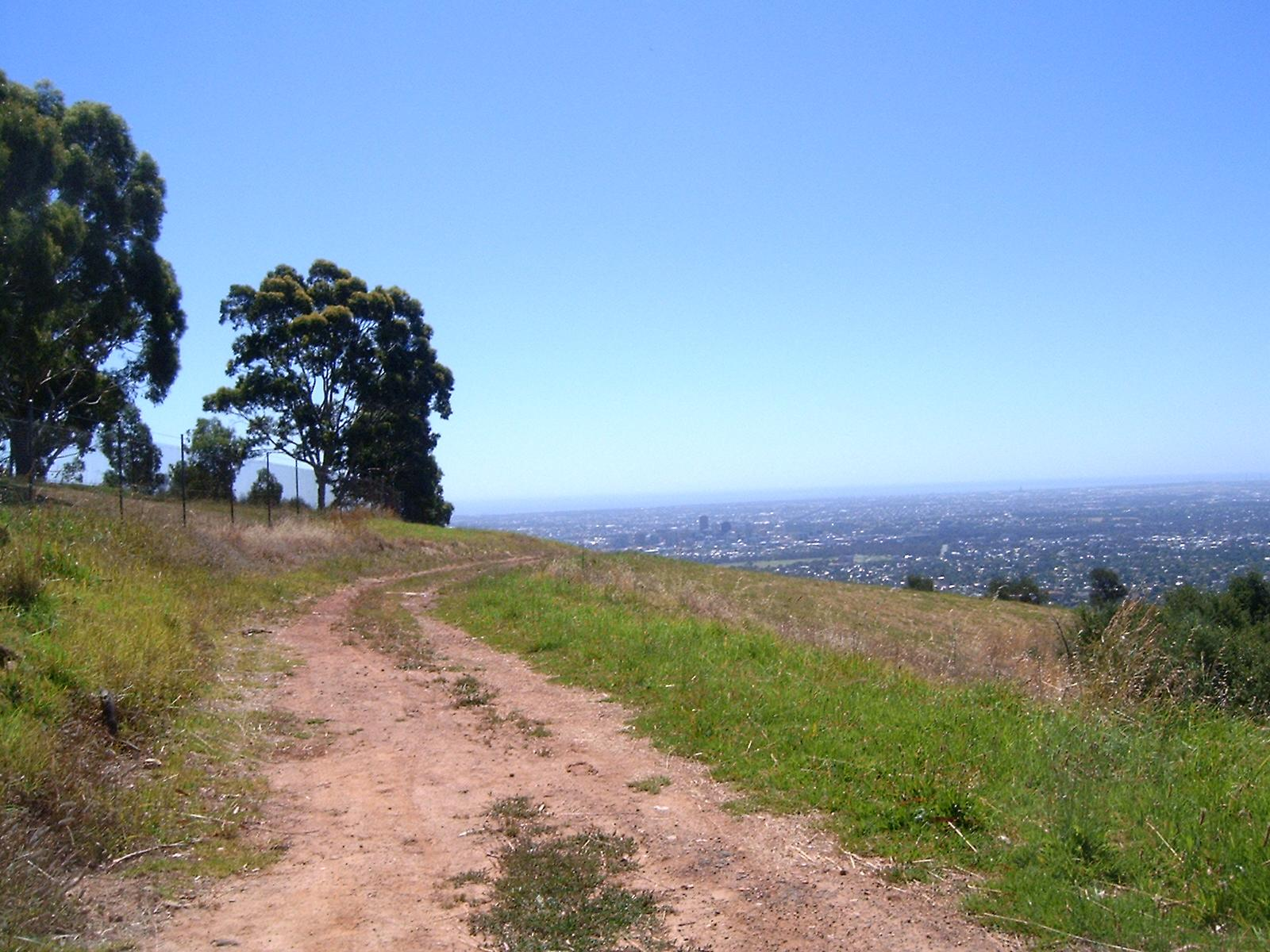
One of Mount Osmond's walking trails – this land is owned by the South Australian Department of Planning, Transport and Infrastructure and was going to be used for a possible alternative route to the South Eastern Freeway in the 1960s. Mount Osmond Golf Course can be seen to the left.

The Sanders family eventually decided to sell much of their portion of Mount Osmond, and at around 1922–23 it was put on the market. Like earlier attempts at sales on Mount Osmond, little interest was received and none was sold until 1925. The land was developed into a golf course and Country Club with the assistance of the Burnside Council and its engineers. Credit to the novel idea went to H.E.S. Melbourne, Burnside's chief engineer at the time – who found support among numerous Burnside Councillors. The golf course and country club were developed on the highest part of the mount, on 85 acres (34 ha) of former Sanders estate. The remaining land was sold by the country club to buyers with strict rules on the development and maintenance of the properties – specific rules applying to aesthetic features, particularly gardens, are of note. Even with a golf course and country club in the vicinity, as well as electricity and a water supply from Waterfall Gully's first creek the eighteen marketed lots once again sold poorly.

One of the last large land purchases was that of Ross Thiem in the 1940s. A club member, C.W. Lloyd, sold 200 acres (0.81 km^{2}) around the golf course, which was again used as pasture by Thiem, who ran sheep on the property – and was the last to do so. The then Highways Department also acquired land in 1951, buying 200 acres (0.81 km^{2}) of land above Beaumont for future transport planning. Thiem's land was eventually sold in the 1950s, to the Rossdale Property Co. Their subsequent attempts at selling the land were just as fruitless as those before, and once again the property changed hands to the Mount Osmond Heights Pty Ltd. The land was newly subdivided, and it was in the late 1960s that finally much of Mount Osmond was sold to residential buyers. Fifty-two out of the 116 new sites had been sold by 12 October 1968 at an average of $3,500, according to the Adelaide daily The Advertiser. Since the land sales of that era, Mount Osmond has developed slowly because of the scarcity of land and the housing and development restrictions of the Hills Face Zone. Now the suburb is home to large, extravagant, tree-filled houses and properties. With the upgrade of Mount Barker Road to become part of the South Eastern Freeway from 1997, Mount Osmond received its own freeway interchange as part of the development.

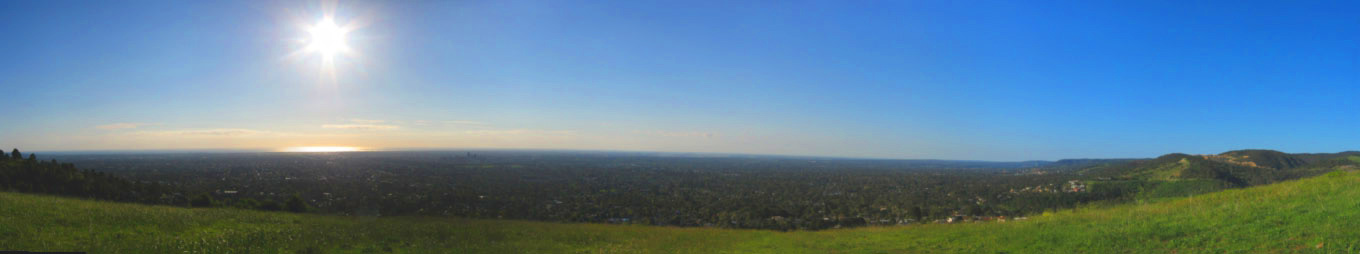
Panoramic view of the Adelaide plain from Mount Osmond

== Geography ==
Location of Mount Osmond in the Adelaide Metropolitan Area

Mount Osmond is composed of the Mount itself and a ridge (Long Ridge) stretching out to the south-east between the valley of the South Eastern Freeway and that of Waterfall Gully. Much of the suburb is more than 300 metres above sea level, with the Mount Osmond peak itself (located in the Golf Course grounds near the club house) at 384 metres. Between the north-east and north-west are slopes leading down to the suburbs of Beaumont, Glen Osmond and Waterfall Gully, most of which is owned as public land by various government departments – either as parks, tracks or vacant land for possible future use. A somewhat "ring" of reserves exist on the slopes anti-clockwise from the Old Bullock Track to Mount Osmond Road near the freeway interchange. The South Australian Department of Environment, Water and Natural Resources is responsible for maintaining the Mount Osmond Reserve, which is accessible via Dashwood Gully Reserve and Waterfall Gully Road.

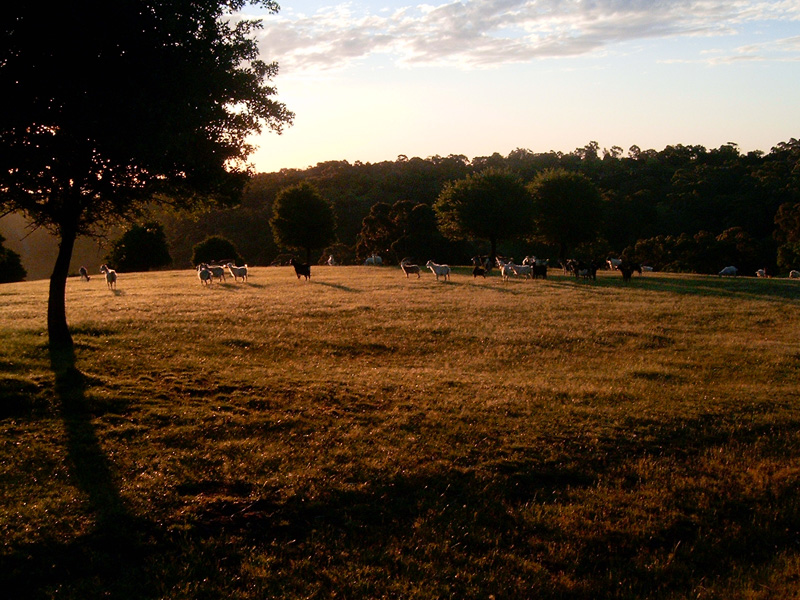
Goats in a Mount Osmond paddock

The Old Bullock/Long Ridge track runs along Long Ridge towards Eagle on the Hill. Much of the housing and residential properties are on the North-West side of the Mount, as to enable views over Adelaide. A few small settlements and paddocks with livestock (sheep, goats and deer) are still present on the slopes between the South Eastern Freeway and the Long Ridge Track.

While the suburb still contains a notable amount of native vegetation, and has not been exposed to invasive introduced species like other areas have, much of it was originally cleared for grazing and has yet to grow back to the same extent. Before European settlement grey box, SA blue gum, sheoak, manna gum and river red gum trees were native to and grew in the area, particularly on the slopes leading down to the Adelaide Plains.

== Transport ==
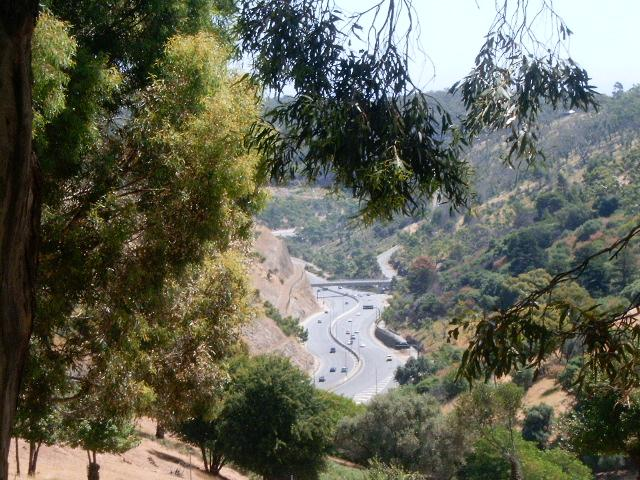
The Mount Osmond Interchange on the South Eastern Freeway. Mount Osmond Road can be seen winding up the hill on the right

Due to the suburb's relative isolation and hilly geography, it contains very few roads and does not conform to Adelaide's typical grid pattern – despite the suburb's age. The earliest road to be built was Mount Osmond Road, and done so by early developers in 1882 to make the suburb more attractive to prospective buyers. Mount Osmond Road remains one of two sealed roads which can today access Mount Osmond and is located to the south of the suburb. It begins as the first interchange on the South Eastern Freeway (formerly Mount Barker Road) and then winds around the Mount to the top of the mount and around the golf course. The other sealed road that provides access to Mount Osmond is Hayward Drive, which starts in Beaumont and then winds around the hills to meet the rest of the suburb's road network.

Numerous fire and walking tracks, among them the Old Bullock Track and the Pioneer Women's Heritage Trail, also access Mount Osmond from Waterfall Gully, Eagle On The Hill, Beaumont and Glen Osmond. Public transport is provided by the Adelaide Metro, but no buses run through Mount Osmond itself. Stops can be found in neighbouring suburbs. The bikeway adjacent to the South Eastern Freeway winds past at the foot of Mount Osmond and can be accessed through the interchange.

== Residents ==
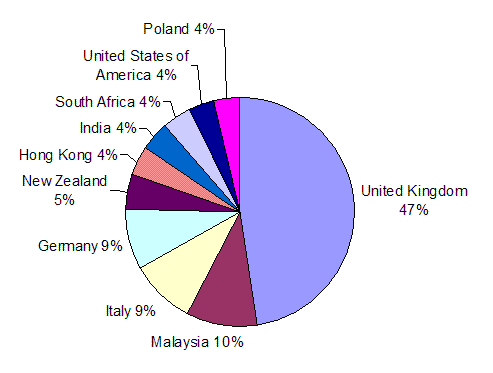
Percentages of the fifth of the population born abroad

In the 2001 Australian Bureau of Statistics Census of Population and Housing, the population of the Mount Osmond census area (which includes the suburbs of Glen Osmond, Leawood Gardens and Waterfall Gully) was 2,497 people, in an area of 6.08 square kilometres. Females outnumbered males 54.2% to 45.8%, and some 21.4% of the population was born overseas (see chart for a breakdown). There was only a slight change in the 2006 census, with the population increasing by 25 to 2,522. Mount Osmond itself had a population of 612 during the 2006 census.

The eight strongest religious affiliations in the area (based on the 2006 census figures) were (in descending order): Anglican, Catholic, Uniting, Lutheran, Orthodox Christian, Buddhist, Presbyterian, Church of Christ and Baptist (a combination of other Christian faiths came in somewhere between Presbyterians and the Church of Christ, with 31 adherents). Also of note is the high occurrence of religious affiliation (67.3%) in the region in comparison to the Adelaide (and national) average. Christian belief (64.4%) is most prominent, with little growth in other religions.

Residents in these four suburbs are more affluent than the Adelaide average, with a high occurrence of incomes over A$1000 per week, which is also above the average for the City of Burnside. A majority of workers are employed in professional or white collar fields.

The census area that incorporates Mount Osmond has a larger proportion of those in both the younger (0–17) and older (60+) age ranges than in the City of Burnside as a whole, and there have been no "numerically significant" changes in the age distribution between the 2001 and 2006 censuses. Similarly, family numbers are also stable, with almost no change between 2001 and 2006.

== Attractions ==
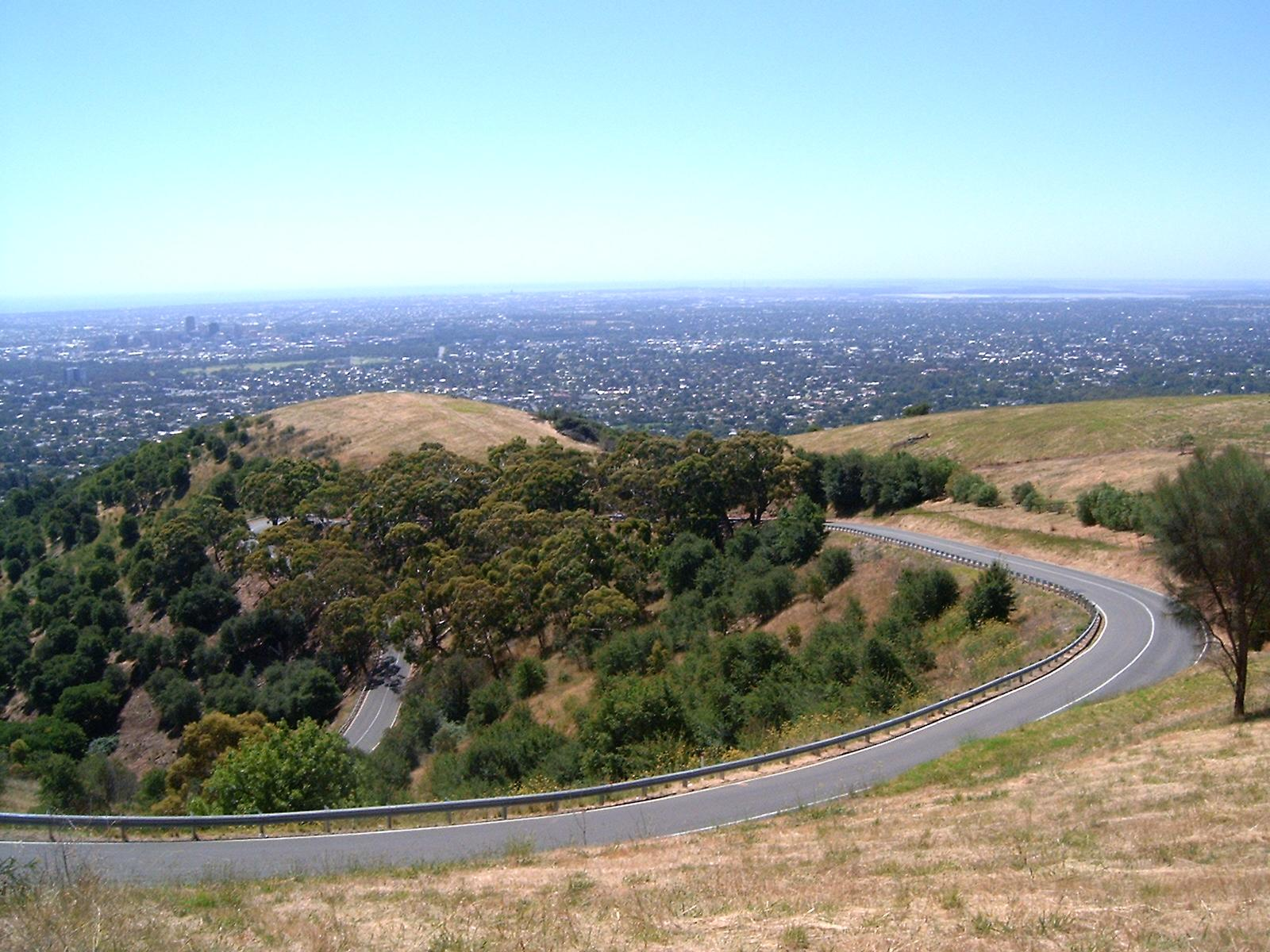
Hayward Drive winding up into Mount Osmond over Adelaide

Mount Osmond contains a number of historical attractions; notably in the former mines and mining infrastructure that remains on the hillside as a reminder of its past. The mines continue up throughout the hills from Glen Osmond. While Wheal Gawler and Wheal Watkins are former open-cut mines (located in Glen Osmond), Mount Osmond contains more mineshafts which are up to sixty metres deep.

Mount Osmond Golf Course is located on the very top of the suburb, and includes its peak. Its course is open only to members. The English-Manor style clubrooms provides meals, coffee and function and events facilities to members and public visitors.

Walking trails are numerous. While a historical walk through the mines can be taken from Beaumont or Glen Osmond, longer walks provide access to Waterfall Gully's falls, the Cleland Wildlife Park and the Adelaide Hills town of Crafers. Walking the Long Ridge track, between the valley of the South Eastern Freeway and Waterfall Gully provides views of Adelaide.

The Old Toll House is located at the start of the South Eastern Freeway below Mount Osmond. The Suburb also has a small bed and breakfast, located at the northern end of Mount Osmond Road.

== Politics ==
2018 state election
Liberal	62.8%
Labor	23.4%
Greens	8.7%
Dignity Party	5.1%

2019 federal election
Liberal	56.61%
Labor	25.11%
Greens	13.08%
United Australia	1.63%
Others	3.58%

Mount Osmond is part of the state electoral district of Bragg, which has been held since 2002 by Liberal MP Vickie Chapman. In federal politics, the suburb is part of the division of Sturt, and has been represented by James Stevens since 2019. The results shown are from the closest polling station to Mount Osmond—which is located outside of the suburb—at St Saviour's Church Hall on Pridmore Road in Glen Osmond. Both electorates have traditionally gone to the Liberal Party, and Bragg in particular is regarded as a very safe Liberal seat. However, in the 2007 federal election, a strong swing towards the Labor Party and their candidate, Mia Handshin, resulted in the electorate transforming from a "safe [federal] Liberal seat into a marginal one". Sturt became a "fairy safe" Liberal seat again in 2013, before becoming marginal in 2016. In the 2019 federal election, Sturt became a fairly safe Liberal seat.

In local government, Mount Osmond is part of the ward of Beaumont within the City of Burnside.
