= Heysen =

Heysen may refer to:

== People ==
- Hans Heysen, South Australian landscape artist
- Nora Heysen, South Australian artist, daughter of Hans

== Other ==
- Heysen Trail, a long-distance walking trail in South Australia
- Heysen Tunnels, a pair of road tunnels in South Australia
- Electoral district of Heysen, an electorate in South Australia
