= Waterfall Gully, South Australia =

Waterfall Gully
- Suburb
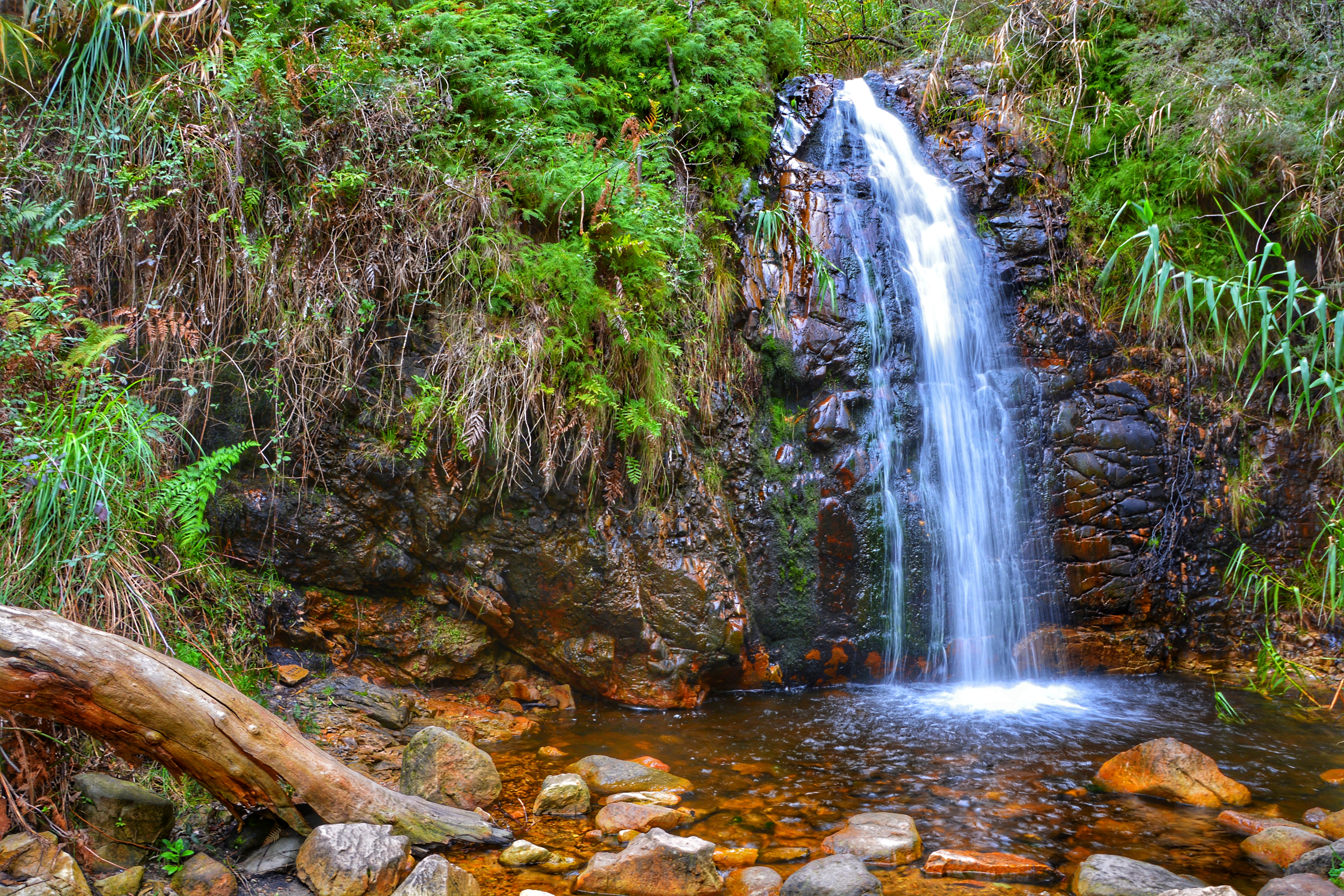

- Interactive map of Waterfall Gully
- Coordinates: 34°57′51″S 138°40′27″E
- Country: Australia
- State: South Australia
- City: Adelaide
- LGA: City of Burnside
- Location: 10 km (6.2 mi) from Adelaide city centre

Government
  - State electorate: Bragg
  - Federal division: Sturt

Area
  - Total: 1.9 km^{2} (0.73 sq mi)

Population
  - Total: 161 (SAL 2021)
- Postcode: 5066
Suburbs around Waterfall Gully
Beaumont	Burnside	Greenhill
Mount Osmond	Waterfall Gully	Cleland
Leawood Gardens	Crafers West	Cleland

Waterfall Gully is an eastern suburb of the South Australian capital city of Adelaide. It is located in the foothills of the Mount Lofty Ranges around 5 km (3.1 mi) east-south-east of the Adelaide city centre. For the most part, the suburb encompasses one long gully with First Creek at its centre and Waterfall Gully Road running adjacent to the creek. At the southern end of the gully is First Falls, the waterfall for which the suburb was named. Part of the City of Burnside, Waterfall Gully is bounded to the north by the suburb of Burnside, from the north-east to south-east by Cleland National Park (part of the suburb of Cleland), to the south by Crafers West, and to the west by Leawood Gardens and Mount Osmond.

Historically, Waterfall Gully was first explored by European settlers in the early-to-mid-19th century, and quickly became a popular location for tourists and picnickers. The government chose to retain control over portions of Waterfall Gully until 1884, when they agreed to place the land under the auspices of the City of Burnside. 28 years later the government took back the management of the southern part of Waterfall Gully, designating it as South Australia's first National Pleasure Resort. Today this area remains under State Government control, and in 1972 the Waterfall Gully Reserve, as it was then known, became part of the larger Cleland Conservation Park (from November 2021 a national park).

Over the years Waterfall Gully has been extensively logged, and early agricultural interests saw the cultivation of a variety of introduced species as crops, along with the development of local market gardens and nurseries. Attempts to mine the area were largely unsuccessful, but the region housed one of the state's earliest water-powered mills, and a weir erected in the early 1880s provided for part of the City of Burnside's water supply. Today the suburb consists primarily of private residences and parks.

== History ==
The Mount Lofty Ranges, which encompass Waterfall Gully, was first sighted by Matthew Flinders in 1802. The gully itself was discovered soon after the establishment of Adelaide, and Colonel William Light, the first Surveyor General of South Australia, was said to have "decided on the site for Adelaide when viewing the plains from the hills near Waterfall Gully". Nevertheless, the gully had seen human visitors long before the arrival of the Europeans, as the native population had lived in the area for up to 40,000 years prior to Flinders' appearance off the South Australian coast.

=== Ethnohistory ===
In Australian Aboriginal mythology, Waterfall Gully and the surrounding Mount Lofty Ranges are part of the story of the ancestor-creator Nganno. Travelling across the land of the native Kaurna people, Nganno was wounded in a battle and laid down to die, forming the Mount Lofty Ranges. The ears of Nganno formed the peaks of Mount Lofty and Mount Bonython, and the region was referred to as Yur-e-billa, or "the place of the ears". The name of the Greater Mount Lofty Parklands, Yurrebilla, was derived from this term, while the nearby town of Uraidla employs a more corrupted form.

Although Hardy states that the Kaurna people did not live in the ranges themselves, they did live on the lower slopes. An early settler of the neighbouring suburb of Beaumont, James Milne Young, described the local Kaurnas: "At every creek and gully you would see their wurlies [simple Aboriginal homes made out of twigs and grass] and their fires at night ... often as many as 500 to 600 would be camped in various places ... some behind the Botanic Gardens on the banks of the river; some toward the Ranges; some on the Waterfall Gully." Their main presence, demarcated by the use of fire against purchasers of land, was on the River Torrens and the creeks that flowed into it, including Waterfall Gully's First Creek.

The land around Waterfall Gully provided the original inhabitants with a number of resources. The bark from the local stringybark trees (Eucalyptus obliqua) was used in the construction of winter huts, and stones and native timbers were used to form tools. Food was also present, and cossid moth larvae along with other species of plants and animals were collected. Nevertheless, there were only a few resources that could only be found on the slopes, and "both hunting and food gathering would in general have been easier on the rich plains".

=== Early colonial exploration ===
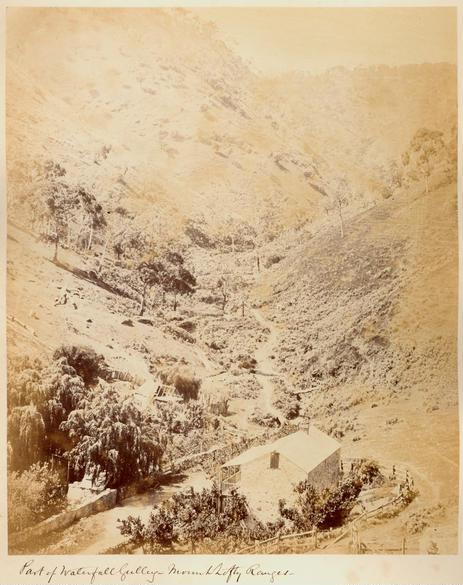
Waterfall Gully in 1866

One of the earliest accounts of Waterfall Gully comes from a "Mr Kent" who, along with Captain Collet Barker and Barker's servant, Miles, climbed Mount Lofty in 1831. In making their ascent the party skirted a ravine—described by Mr Kent as possessing "smooth and grassy sides"—which is believed by Anne Hardy to have been Waterfall Gully. Subsequent to Barker's ascent, the first settlers who were recorded as having climbed Mount Lofty were Bingham Hutchinson and his servant, William Burt. The pair made three attempts to scale the mount before succeeding, and for their first attempt they attempted to traverse Waterfall Gully. The attempt was unsuccessful, but in July 1837, Hutchinson wrote about the gully through which they had travelled. Waterfall Gully he wrote, had proven difficult, as the plants were so thickly grown as to provide a significant barrier to their progress. Near the point of surrender, Hutchinson described how they were "agreeably surprised by seeing a wall of rock about fifty or sixty feet [fifteen to eighteen metres] high, which stretched across the ravine, and from the top of it leapt the brook which had so long been [their] companion". The brook was First Creek, and the waterfall they sighted is today known as First Falls.

Nevertheless, Hutchinson was not the first to see First Falls. The first known recorded sighting of the waterfall by a colonial was that of John William Adams, an emigrant of HMS Buffalo in early January 1837, who named it "Adams' Waterfall". He was traveling with his wife, Susanna and a party consisting of Nicholson's and Breaker's who had the use of a dray to go into the hills. Adams states "we were opposite the spot where the Eagle on the Hill now is, and the question was put, who would volunteer to go down the hillside to try for water".

=== Development ===
The area soon became a tourist attraction for the early South Australian colonists, and was a popular destination for picnickers. In 1851 Francis Clark wrote that "Waterfall Gully is the most picturesque place for a picnic that I have ever visited", and by the 1860s the area had become known throughout Adelaide. The use of Waterfall Gully as picnic spot was facilitated by the decision of the government of the day not to subdivide the area containing the waterfalls. Section 920, as it was designated, did not enter into private hands, and thus members of the public were able to access the area from the nearby suburb of Eagle on the Hill on Mount Barker road. The position of the Eagle on the Hill hotel proved advantageous for this, as it permitted visitors to stop by for lunch before walking down the hill in the afternoon.

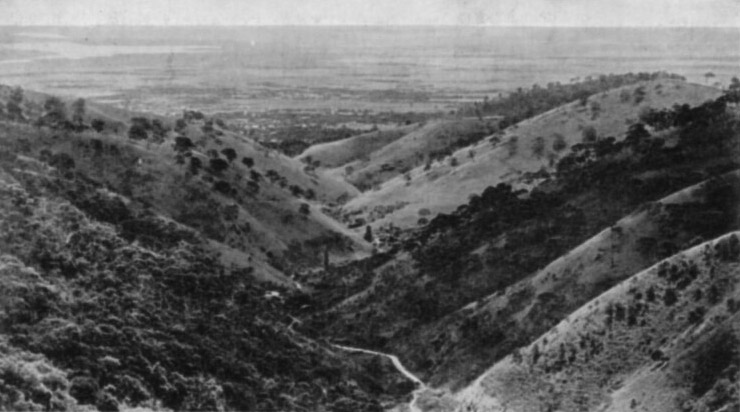
View of Waterfall Gully in South Australia, as seen from Eagle on the Hill in 1910

Other parts of the Waterfall Gully area were subdivided, though, and much of the area was owned by Samuel Davenport. Davenport used the land for timber, grazing, and the cultivation of various crops, including olives and grapes for wine production. Other local residents ran market gardens and nurseries. For example, local residents Wilhelm Mügge and his wife Auguste Schmidt operated "one of the best nurseries and market gardens near Adelaide", and gained a reputation for the cheeses produced from their local dairy farm. Along with farming, the hills and creek were prized areas for the sawyers and splitters, and a number of mines were established in the region from the mid-to-late 19th century. In 1844 the first silver-lead, manganese and iron mines were established in the area, while the 1890s saw a minor gold rush—although "only small quantities were extracted". Of greater success was stone quarrying in Chambers' Gully, which began in 1863 and increased in scale in 1912.

Waterfall Gully was also the site of Burnside's "first secondary industry". In the late 1830s, Thomas Cain built a watermill on First Creek for John Cannan, which was then employed to power a sawmill on Cannan's property. Cannan operated the mill as the "Traversbrook Mill" for approximately two years before selling the venture to a Mr. Finniss. Finniss opted to run the mill as a flour mill instead, and the mill was rebuilt and renamed "Finnissbrook Mill". The mill continued to operate under a variety of owners until the late 1850s, but it was dismantled during the 1880s, and today only traces of the earthworks remain.

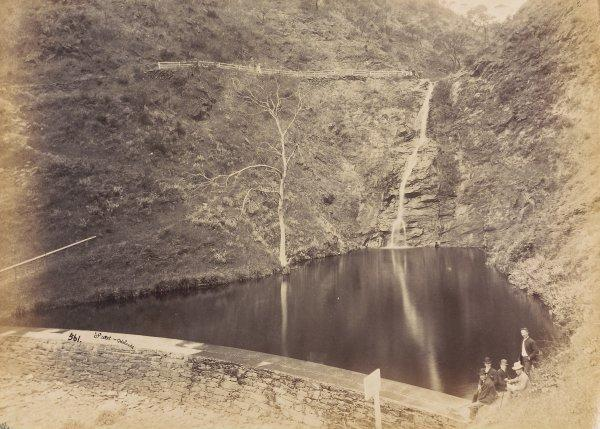
First Falls in the late 1800s, with the weir visible in the foreground

During this period the population of the nearby village of Burnside was expanding and required a new water supply. First Creek—which runs down Waterfall Gully and enters the River Torrens near today's Botanic Gardens—was seen as the perfect solution to the water shortage. A weir was built during 1881 and 1882, and was made to hold approximately two megalitres (530,000 US gallons) of water. A pipeline was constructed to the reservoir at Burnside South, and from there the water was used throughout the surrounding area. As a side effect, the weir also reduced the volume of water available to the local market gardeners, and over many years that aspect of the region disappeared.

While the route to the falls from Eagle on the Hill was on public land, the alternative route along the gully was through private properties. Nevertheless, many visitors chose this route, and a combination of public demand and a desire from some of the landowners for improved access to and from their properties—especially from the Mügge family—led to pressure to build a road through the gully. Although there was opposition from some of the locals, the Waterfall Gully road was built in the late 1880s.

The completion of the road led to an increase in visitor numbers. Rather than a bumpy horse ride, visitors could now catch the horse tram to the start of the gully, and walk, cycle or ride to the falls. To provide for tourists, the area gained a number of road-side kiosks and produce stalls, and the Mügge family erected the two-storey Waterfall Hotel along the path. Furthermore, in 1912 the government opened a kiosk at the base of First Falls, designed in the "style of a Swiss chalet". The hotel is a private residence today, but the kiosk continues to operate.

In 1880, Second Falls was covered in lush ferns. Today the ferns have all but disappeared, and introduced species have taken their place.

=== Protection ===
Although some parts of Waterfall Gully were transferred from the District Council of East Torrens (now the Adelaide Hills Council) to the City of Burnside in 1856 when the suburb's current boundaries were established, the government of the day chose to retain control of a significant portion of Waterfall Gully. Thus it was not until 1884 that the remaining land was transferred to the control of the Burnside Council, eventuating largely through the efforts of Samuel Davenport and G. F. Cleland.

The land remained under the Burnside Council's control until 1915, when the Waterfall Gully Reserve was reclaimed by the government as the first National Pleasure Resort in the state. Initially the reserve was placed under the jurisdiction of the National Parks Advisory Board, but later it was moved to the Tourist Bureau, before finally becoming part of the National Park Commission's portfolio.

In 1945, much of the area that is today's Cleland National Park was purchased by the State Government, largely thanks to the efforts of Professor Sir John Cleland. Most of this land was combined in 1963 to create the park that extends eastwards up the gully to the summit of Mount Lofty and northwards to Greenhill Road. Waterfall Gully Reserve was added to the park in 1972.

=== Natural disasters ===
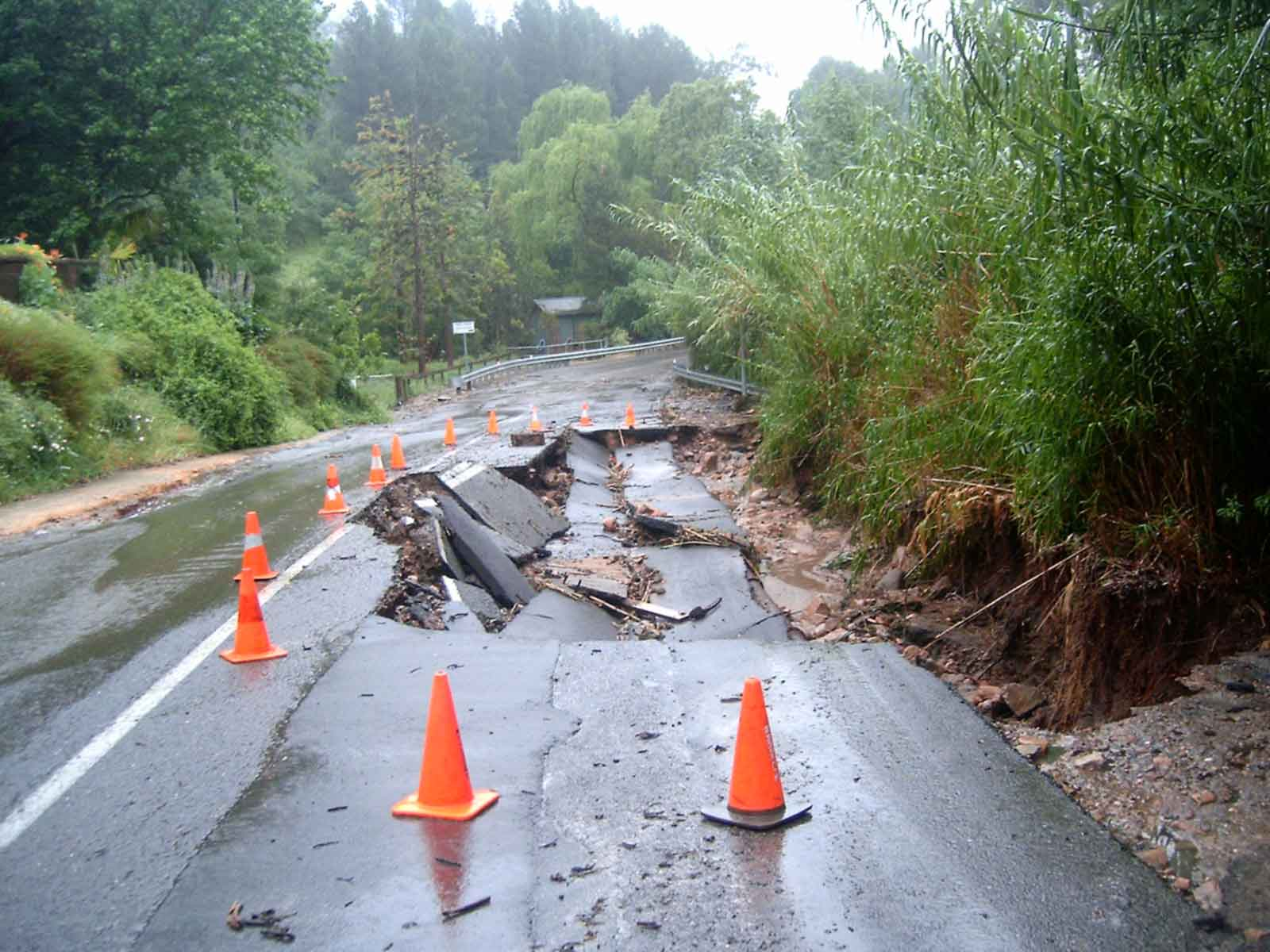
Waterfall Gully Road after the November 2005 Floods

Over the years since European settlement Waterfall Gully has suffered from both bushfires and flooding. The gully was severely hit by a number of bushfires in 1939 that threatened the area, and further bushfires in the early 1940s caused considerable damage because of the war effort diverting supplies and personnel from the Emergency Fire Service. Significant floods occurred in 1889 and 1931, and, on the night of 7 November 2005, Waterfall Gully was one of several areas in Adelaide to experience severe flooding. Waterfall Gully was one of the hardest hit suburbs: Bob Stevenson, Duty Officer of the State Emergency Service (SES), commented that "There's an area called Waterfall Gully Road, in the foothills, where one of the creeks comes down, and there's quite a few houses affected there ... there was 40 or so houses affected on that one road alone." Properties were flooded, two bridges nearly collapsed, and 100 m (330 ft) of road was washed away. Burnside council workers, the Country Fire Service (CFS) and the SES repaired the initial damage on the night while reconstruction of infrastructure commenced in late November. Much of the road had been inaccessible, and the suburb was closed except to residents and emergency workers for the remainder of the month.

== Geography ==
Location of Waterfall Gully Road in the Adelaide Metropolitan Area

Waterfall Gully is situated at an average elevation of 234 m (768 ft) above sea level, in an area of 6.08 km^{2} (2.35 sq mi). Its most notable geographical features are its gully and waterfall. Langman Reserve, a large local park, is 300 m (980 ft) from the start of Waterfall Gully Road while much of the north-eastern side of the gully is part of Cleland National Park. Adjoining Waterfall Gully, 2 km (1.2 mi) away, is Chambers Gully, which used to function as a land-fill, but has in the past decade been reclaimed as a park through volunteer work. It contains a number of old ruins, walking trails, and springs and is home to a significant number of native species.

Since European Settlement the native plant life has been considerably affected, with the native manna gum and blue gum woodlands being largely cleared for agricultural uses. The large amount of non-native vegetation in the gully is predominantly the result of the early agriculture, although some species were introduced by accident. Introduced species include olive trees, hawthorn, fennel and blackberry. With the reduction of native flora, exotic fauna have flourished around the Waterfall Gully region. These include rabbits, blackbirds and starlings. However, not all of the native wildlife has been lost—bats (in particular, Gould's wattled bat), can be found in the area, as can superb fairy-wrens and Adelaide rosellas, and a large number of unique Australian animals such as kangaroos, koalas and possums can be spotted on some of the walking trails.

== Transport ==
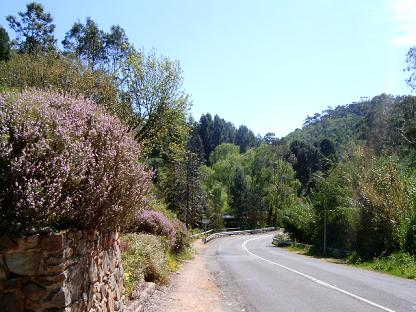
Waterfall Gully Road

Waterfall Gully is connected to the major Adelaide thoroughfare Greenhill Road by Waterfall Terrace and Glynburn Road, and cars are the preferred mode of transport in the suburb. According to the Australian Bureau of Statistics 71.9% of residents in the census area employed private vehicles for their commute to work. Only a small proportion (1.3%) walked to work and but 1.2% cycled, while only 3.6% of Waterfall Gully residents travel to work by bus. The closest bus route for Waterfall Gully is the 142 bus, provided by the multi-service Adelaide Metro.

Waterfall Gully Road is meandering and in some parts quite narrow. This has led to concerns regarding safety, as the road is frequented by both pedestrians and cyclists. After the death of a cyclist in 2007, calls for the repair and resurfacing of the road intensified, with two petitions being tabled in parliament. The accident also led to a safety audit being conducted by TransportSA, and although the results were not released to the public at the time, it called for an investigation of the entire length of the road. As of mid-2008, there has been no clear plan released for the future of the road, with the road missing out on funding in the 2008 state budget.

== Residents ==
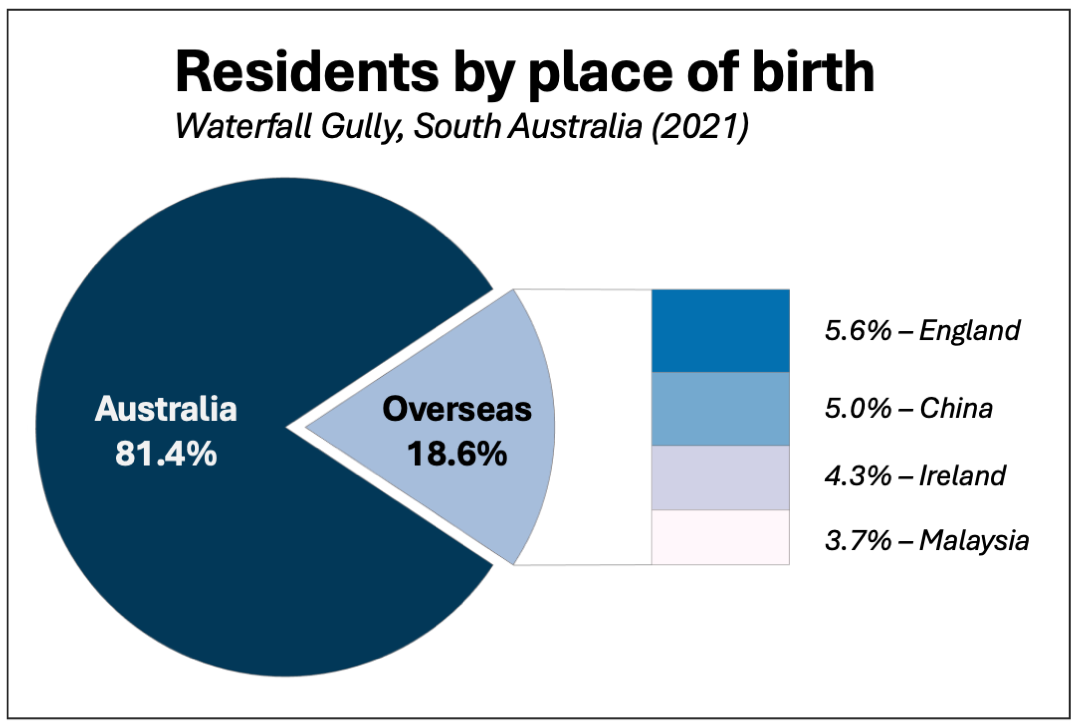
Chart showing Waterfall Gully residents by their place of birth, as at the 2021 census.

As at the 2021 census, the population of Waterfall Gully was 161. Around 51% of the population were male and 49% were female, whilst the median age was 40 years.

Waterfall Gully residents were comparatively affluent as at the 2021 census, with a median weekly household income of A$3,600 per week, much higher than the A$1,455 per week compared across all of South Australia. 41.0% of employed people in Waterfall Gully were professionals, 25.3% were managers, and 6.0% were technicians and trades workers. For comparison, across South Australia as a whole, these occupations constituted 21.5%, 13.0%, and 13.2% of employed people, respectively. Further, 44.7% of Waterfall Gully residents aged 15 years and over reported a bachelor's degree or higher as their highest level of educational attainment, near double that recorded for all of South Australia (22.7%).

81.4% of the population of Waterfall Gully were born in Australia, higher than the 71.5% of all South Australians, and much higher than the 66.9% of Australians as a whole. The top places of birth outside Australia were England (5.6%), China (5.0%), and Ireland (4.3%). These numbers represent small sample sizes; as only nine Waterfall Gully residents were born in England. The same number of Waterfall Gully residents reported their ancestry as Australian as those who reported being of English ancestry (30.4%), whilst Scottish (11.2%), Chinese (11.2%), and Irish (9.3%) were the next highest responses; noting that respondents could select up to two ethnicities.

== Attractions ==
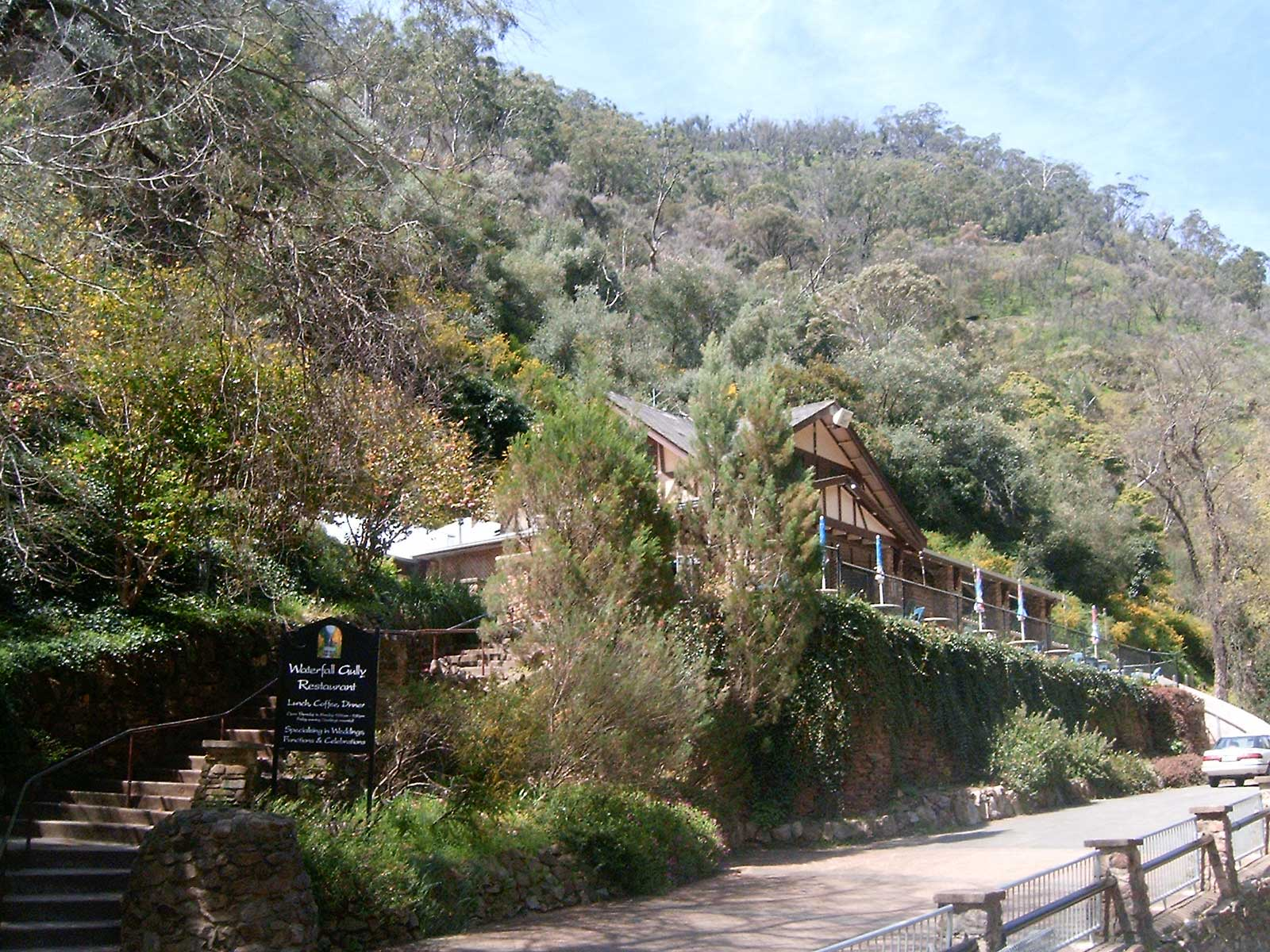
Waterfall Gully Restaurant

The main attraction of Waterfall Gully is the waterfall, First Falls. It is at the south-eastern end of the road, in land owned by Cleland National Park. The weir at the bottom of the Waterfall was constructed in the late 19th century and was part of Adelaide's early water supply. Development in the area has continued since the construction of a restaurant in 1912. Developments over recent decades have included improving access to the site, upgrading the bridges, and the addition of new signage.

The Waterfall Gully Restaurant was constructed between 1911 and 1912 by South Australian architects Albert Selmar Conrad and his brother Frank, and was formally opened by Sir Day Bosanquet on 9 November 1912. Built in the style of a Swiss chalet, the building has been heritage listed since 1987, and is reputedly haunted by the ghost of a firefighter who died from burns suffered in 1926.

Other fire tracks and walking trails wind around the hills that surround Waterfall Gully, branching off from Chambers Gully, Woolshed Gully or the area around First Creek. Destinations include Crafers, Eagle On The Hill, Mount Lofty, Mount Osmond and the Cleland Wildlife Park, located in the Cleland National Park. The tracks have been rebuilt and resurfaced in the past ten years, and older and more perilous routes sealed because of the difficult terrain. Many offer views of the city of Adelaide as well as the Gully itself. One of these connects to the 1,200 km (750 mi) Heysen Trail.

== Politics ==
2006 state election
Liberal	58.7%
Labor	25.7%
Greens	8.2%
Democrats	4.1%
Family First	3.3%

2007 federal election
Liberal	61.9%
Labor	29.2%
Greens	6.4%
Family First	1.6%
Democrats	0.8%

Waterfall Gully is part of the state electoral district of Bragg, which has been held since 2002 by Liberal MP Vickie Chapman. In federal politics, the suburb is part of the division of Sturt. The results shown are from the closest polling station to Waterfall Gully—which is located outside of the suburb—at St David's Church Hall on nearby Glynburn Road (Burnside). Both electorates have traditionally gone to the Liberal Party, and Bragg in particular is regarded as a very safe Liberal seat. However, in the 2007 federal election, a strong swing towards the Labor Party and their candidate, Mia Handshin, resulted in the electorate transforming from a "safe [federal] Liberal seat into a marginal one".

In local government, Waterfall Gully is part of the ward of Beaumont within the City of Burnside, and the current Mayor for the district is David Parkin. Beaumont is currently represented by councilors Mark Osterstock and Anne Monceaux.
