= Leawood Gardens =

- Suburb
- Coordinates: 34°58′23″S 138°40′08″E
- Country: Australia
- State: South Australia
- City: Adelaide
- LGAs: City of Burnside; City of Mitcham

Government
  - State electorate: Bragg
  - Federal divisions: Sturt; Boothby

Population
  - Total: 57 (SAL 2021)
- Postcode: 5150
Suburbs around Leawood Gardens
Mount Osmond		Waterfall Gully
	Leawood Gardens
Brown Hill Creek		Crafers West

Leawood Gardens is a small suburb of Adelaide, South Australia in both the City of Mitcham and the City of Burnside located in the foothills of the Adelaide Hills. It is crossed by both the South Eastern Freeway and Mount Barker Road uphill from the "Devil's Elbow" intersection, and contains the northern portal of the Heysen Tunnels.
