= Wellington Road, South Australia =

Road in South Australia

Wellington Road Meechi Road South Australia
- Coordinates: 35.073193°S 138.857567°E (Northwest end); 35.296252°S 139.037048°E (Southeast end)

General information
- Type: Road
- Length: 31.3 km (19 mi)
- Route number(s): B37 (1998–present) (Mount Barker–Wistow)

Major junctions
- Northwest end: Adelaide Road; Mount Barker, South Australia
- Long Valley Road
- Southeast end: Langhorne Creek Road; Langhorne Creek, South Australia

Location(s)
- Region: Adelaide Hills, Fleurieu and Kangaroo Island
- Major suburbs: Mount Barker, Wistow, Woodchester

Wellington Road (and Meechi Road at its south-eastern end) is a South Australian secondary road, connecting Mount Barker with the towns of Wistow, Highland Valley, Woodchester and Langhorne Creek. Its north-western portion has been designated part of route B37.

== History ==
Wellington Road previously served as an early alignment of the Princes Highway some time after it was first declared in South Australia in February 1922, initially defined along the route via now known as Strathalbyn Road from Adelaide via Aldgate, Mylor, Macclesfield, Strathalbyn, Langhorne Creek, crossing the Murray River at Wellington and then continuing along the present route beyond Meningie, By 1928, the route was re-aligned to run through Mount Barker and along Wellington Road via Wistow and Woodchester to Langhorne Creek, although by 1935 this alignment was changed to run via Nairne, Kanmantoo, Murray Bridge and Tailem Bend (along what is now known as the Old Princes Highway).

== Major intersections ==
LGA	Location	km	mi	Destinations	Notes
Mount Barker	Mount Barker	0.0	0.0	Adelaide Road (B37) – Littlehampton, Hahndorf, to South Eastern Freeway	Northern terminus of road, route B37 continues north along Adelaide Road
Mount Barker	Wistow	5.5	3.4	Long Valley Road (B37) – Strathalbyn	Route B37 continues south along Long Valley Road
Alexandrina	Woodchester	18.7	11.6	Callington Road (north) – Callington	
Alexandrina	Woodchester	19.3	12.0	Callington Road (south) – Strathalbyn	Name transition: Wellington Road (north), Meechi Road (south)
Alexandrina	Langhorne Creek	31.3	19.4	Langhorne Creek Road (B45) – Strathalbyn, Wellington	Southern terminus of road
Route transition
