= Mount Barker Road =

Road in South Australia

Mount Barker Road Adelaide Road South Australia
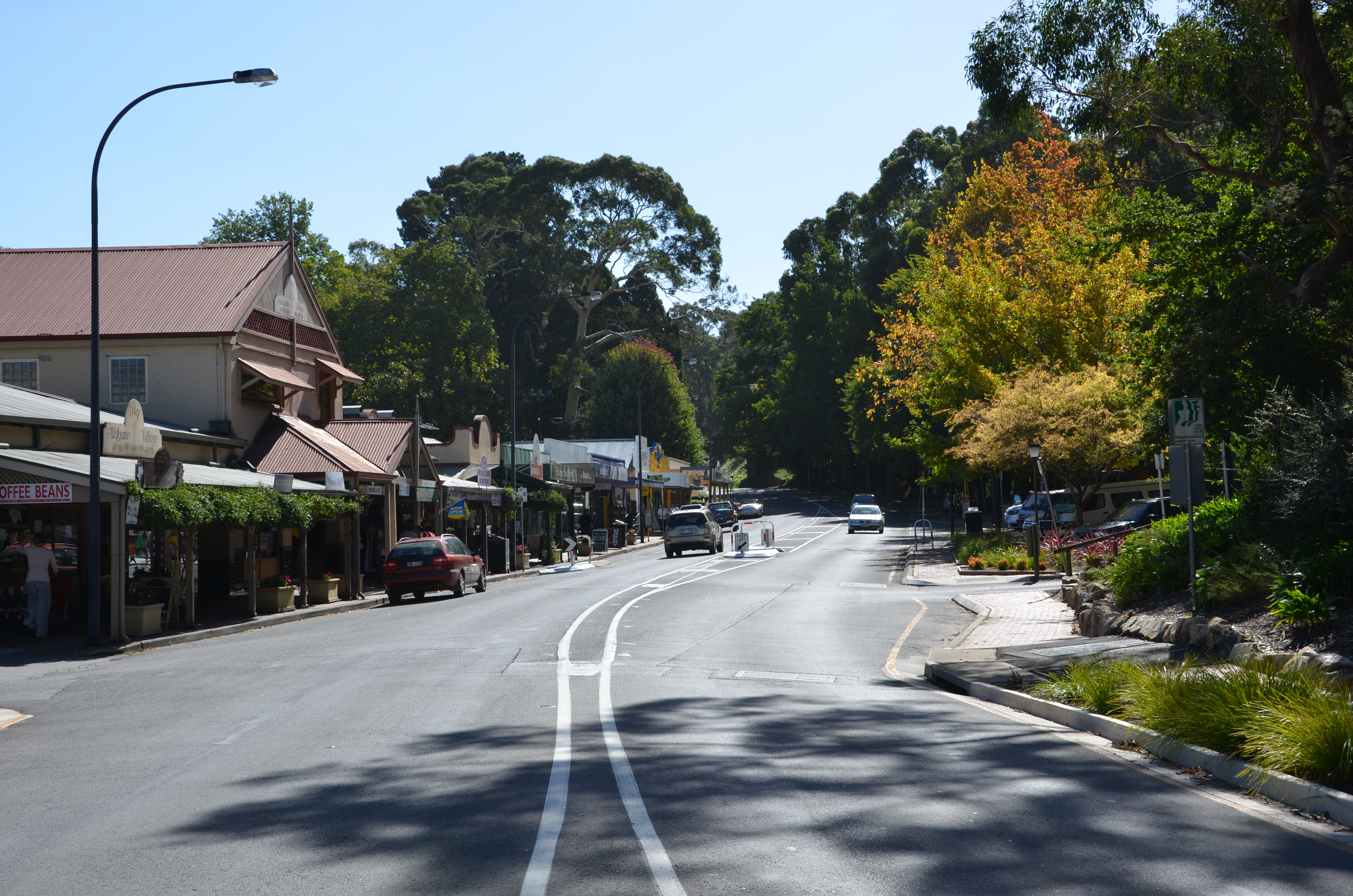
- Mount Barker Road looking northwest in Aldgate
- Coordinates: 34.966848°S 138.668172°E (West end); 35.055059°S 138.853126°E (East end)

General information
- Type: Road
- Length: 24.0 km (15 mi)
- Route number(s): (1998–present) (Stirling–Aldgate); (1998–present) (Verdun–Hahndorf); (1998–present) (Totness–Mount Barker)
- Former route number: National Highway A1 (1998–2000); National Highway 1 (1974–1998); National Route 1 (1955–1974) (Glen Osmond–Crafers); National Route 1 (1955–1972) (Stirling–Verdun); National Route 1 (1955–1974) (Verdun–Totness)

Major junctions
Mount Barker Road (West)
- West end: South Eastern Freeway; Leawood Gardens, Adelaide
- East end: South Eastern Freeway; Crafers West, Adelaide
Mount Barker Road (East)
- West end: South Eastern Freeway; Stirling, Adelaide
- Strathalbyn Road; Onkaparinga Valley Road; Echunga Road; Old Princes Highway
- East end: Wellington Road; Mount Barker, South Australia

Location(s)
- Region: Adelaide Hills
- Major suburbs: Eagle On The Hill, Crafers, Stirling, Aldgate, Bridgewater, Verdun, Hahndorf

Mount Barker Road was once the main road from Adelaide through the Adelaide Hills to Mount Barker on the eastern slopes of the Mount Lofty Ranges. The main route has now been replaced, or subsumed into, the South Eastern Freeway, but two sections of it remain, and are still classified as state roads.

== Route ==
A vestigial portion of Mount Barker Road exists through the "Old Toll Gate" at Glen Osmond, but has completely subsumed into the South Eastern Freeway as far as the Devil's Elbow, where a surviving western alignment of the road turns a sharp hairpin and has a winding uphill through Eagle On The Hill and rejoins South Eastern Freeway near Measday's Hill in Crafers West.

The eastern portion of Mount Barker Road resumes from the freeway's Stirling exit, passing through the main shopping strips of Stirling and Aldgate as State Route B33. From Aldgate, Route B33 continues on Strathalbyn Road, while Mount Barker Road follows the railway line as Tourist Route 57 to Bridgewater and under the freeway at Verdun where it joins State Route B34 (from Onkaparinga Valley Road) for a little over 3 kilometres (1.9 mi) through Hahndorf. At the south end of Hahndorf route B34 turns under the freeway towards Echunga and Mount Barker Road continues on the north side to the Mount Barker Interchange at Totness, where it changes name to Adelaide Road, and eventually ends at Mount Barker.

== History ==
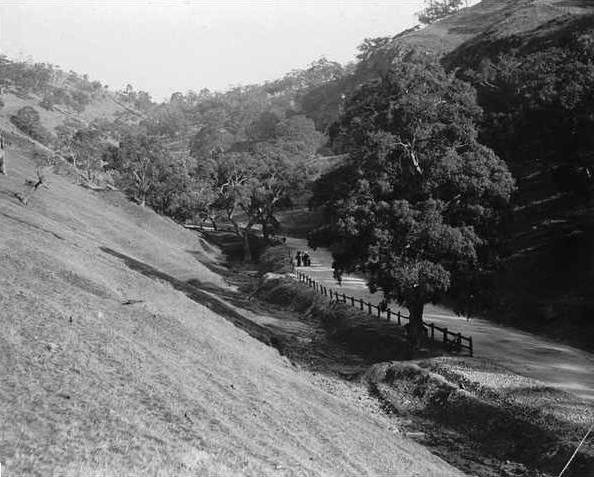
Mount Barker Road in 1900

Mount Barker Road served as an early alignment of Princes Highway some time after it was first declared in South Australia in February 1922, initially defined along Mount Barker Road and the route via now known as Strathalbyn Road from Adelaide via Aldgate, Mylor, Macclesfield, Strathalbyn, Langhorne Creek, crossing the Murray River at Wellington and then continuing along the present route beyond Meningie, By 1928, the route was re-aligned to run further along Mount Barker Road through Mount Barker, and along Wellington Road via Wistow and Woodchester to Langhorne Creek, although by 1935 this alignment was changed to run via Nairne, Kanmantoo, Murray Bridge and Tailem Bend (along what is now known as the Old Princes Highway).

Princes Highway functioned as Adelaide's major south-eastern approach and was heavily trafficked; government plans to upgrade this route weaving through the Adelaide Hills had begun by the early 1960s. Initial sections of the road project that eventually became the South Eastern Freeway commenced in December 1965, along a 2 km section from Measday's Hill to Stirling: the eastbound carriageway was opened to traffic in 1967, and the section was fully completed in 1969 when the remaining carriageway and the Crafers Interchange became fully operational. The next stage extended the freeway east through Bridgewater to Verdun and opened in 1972, and from Verdun to Mount Barker in 1974, completely replacing Princes Highway – renamed back to Mount Barker Road – as the main route between Mount Barker and Crafers. As this was part of Highway 1, the route was progressively re-aligned along the freeway as sections of it opened. Mount Barker Road today remains as the main street of Stirling, continuing to Aldgate, Bridgewater, under the freeway at Verdun, then through Hahndorf to end near the Mount Barker interchange of the freeway. The road continues south over the interchange as Adelaide Road (reflecting the reverse journey) to terminate in Mount Barker.

The last part of the South Eastern Freeway to be built reconstructed the Adelaide end of Mount Barker Road including a grade-separated intersection at Mount Osmond Road. It replaced the infamous Devil's Elbow hairpin with a partial interchange. The new freeway passes through the Heysen Tunnels and rejoins the former alignment the other side of a steep ridge. Mount Barker Road itself climbs over and around the ridge. Since the four-lane dual carriageway is no longer required, part of the uphill side has been replaced with a bike path used as part of a popular cycling route to Mount Lofty and all motor traffic uses the former downhill carriageway. The section between the Measdays interchange and Crafers was also completely replaced by the freeway being built on the same alignment at a lower level in a deep cutting.

=== The Toll House ===
In 1841 a special Act "... for the making, and maintaining the Great Eastern Road" was passed, and construction of the first section from Glen Osmond to Crafers begun at public expense. It was soon realised that this undertaking would be hugely expensive, so a novel (for the day) plan was hatched to relieve the Government of all expense by vesting the management of the road in a private company. The successful tenderer would have the responsibility of completing and maintaining the road, and have the right to levy tolls on users of the road. As this was the only route to and from the burgeoning agricultural districts around Mount Barker, not to mention all road traffic to the eastern colonies, this had all the hallmarks of a great money-maker. The author of The History and Topology of Glen Osmond, Under-Treasurer Tom Gill, no stranger to public finances, described this a 'curiosity in road legislation'.

A toll gate and accommodation for the gate-keeper were erected and one Samuel Selby appointed keeper of the toll-bar, which was to be staffed 24 hours, seven days a week. The tolls levied were:

For every coach, chariot, chaise, gig, hearse, caravan, or other carriage, and every cart, wagon, dray, or other vehicle, if drawn by one horse or two bullocks, 1/.
'For 'such carriage or vehicle' drawn by two horses or four bullocks, 1/6; by four horses or six bullocks, 2/; by six or more horses, or eight or more' bullocks, 3/;
by one pony, mule, or ass not exceeding 13 hands high, 6d.; by two or more such ponies,' mules, or asses, 1/; for every saddle or led horse, mule, or ass, 6d.; for horses, mules, asses, oxen, cows, or other neat cattle driven, per head 1d.; and for sheep, lambs, calves, dogs, swine, or goats driven, each ½d.
Only one full toll in any one day might be demanded for any animal or vehicle, except stage coaches or carriages plying for hire.
Exempt from payment were: the Governor, survey, and police, also agricultural produce not bought or sold, but going to be sold or disposed of, also persons travelling to and from Divine Service on Sundays.

The tolls were vexatious and led to a great deal of ill-feeling and were abolished in 1847 by the Legislative Council on the motion of Samuel Davenport. The company failed to reap the rewards anticipated, partly on account of the increased cost of labour as a result of the exodus of able-bodied men to the Victorian goldfields.

The octagonal toll-house, much restored, still stands at Glen Osmond, between the up and down tracks at the start of the Mount Barker Road, now the South Eastern Freeway.

== Major intersections ==
=== Western section ===
LGA	Location	km	mi	Destinations	Notes
Burnside	Leawood Gardens	0.0	0.0	South Eastern Freeway (M1) – Glen Osmond	Western terminus of road
Adelaide Hills	Crafers West	5.2	3.2	South Eastern Freeway (M1) – Crafers	Eastern terminus of road
Route transition

=== Eastern section ===
LGA	Location	km	mi	Destinations	Notes
Adelaide Hills	Stirling	0.0	0.0	South Eastern Freeway (M1) – Glen Osmond	Western terminus of Mount Barker Road and route B33
Adelaide Hills	Aldgate	2.9	1.8	Strathalbyn Road (B33 east) – Echunga, Strathalbyn	Route B33 continues southeast along Strathalbyn Road
Adelaide Hills	Bridgewater	5.1	3.2	Carey Gully Road – Carey Gully	
Adelaide Hills	Verdun	8.2	5.1	Onkaparinga Valley Road (B34 north) – Balhannah, Mount Torrens, Birdwood	Route B34 continues north along Onkaparinga Valley Road
Mount Barker	Hahndorf	11.4	7.1	Echunga Road (B34 south) – Echunga	Route B34 continues south along Echunga Road
Mount Barker	Totness	16.6	10.3	Old Princes Highway – Nairne, Kanmantoo, Murray Bridge	Northern terminus of route B37; Name change: Mount Barker Road (west), Adelaide Road (south)
Mount Barker	Mount Barker	18.8	11.7	Wellington Road (B37) – Strathalbyn, Langhorne Creek	Eastern terminus of Adelaide Road, route B37 continues southeast along Wellington Road
Route transition
