= Chambers Gully =

Coordinates: 34.954°S 138.691°E

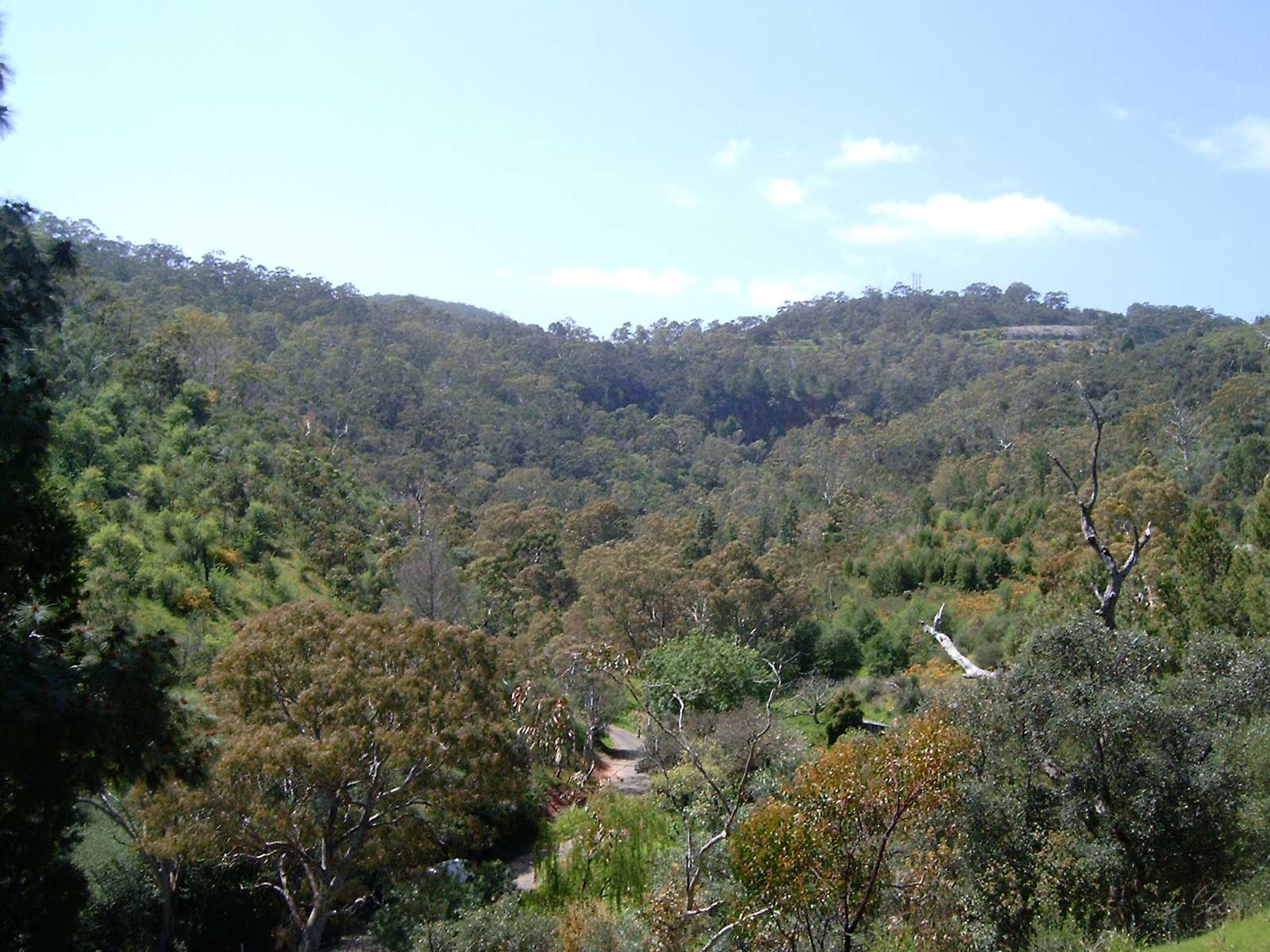
Chambers Gully, as viewed from one of Waterfall Gully's firetracks

Chambers Gully is an offshoot of Waterfall Gully in the Eastern Suburbs of Adelaide, South Australia. It used to be a local landfill but in the past decade has been reclaimed as a park by volunteer work. It contains a number of old ruins, walking trails, springs and is an excellent place to spot local wildlife such as koalas.
