= South Eastern Freeway =

Freeway in South Australia

South Eastern Freeway South Australia
- Coordinates: 34.963398°S 138.644003°E (West end); 35.149739°S 139.295331°E (East end)

General information
- Type: Freeway
- Length: 73.1 km (45 mi)
- Opened: 1967–2000
- Route number(s): M1 (2017–present)
- Former route number: National Highway M1 (1998–2017); National Highway 1 (1974–1998); National Route 1 (1967–1974)

Major junctions
- West end: Glen Osmond Road; Glen Osmond, Adelaide
- Cross Road; Portrush Road; Mount Barker Road; Onkaparinga Valley Road; Adelaide Road
- East end: Princes Highway; Long Flat, South Australia

Location(s)
- Region: Eastern Adelaide, Adelaide Hills, Murray and Mallee
- Major suburbs / towns: Crafers, Stirling, Bridgewater, Hahndorf, Mount Barker, Callington, Monarto, Murray Bridge

Highway system
- Highways in Australia; National Highway • Freeways in Australia; Highways in South Australia

South Eastern Freeway is a 73 km (45 mi) freeway in South Australia (SA). It is a part of the National Highway network linking the state capital cities of Adelaide, SA, and Melbourne, Victoria, and is signed as route M1. It carries traffic over the Adelaide Hills between Adelaide and the River Murray, near Murray Bridge, where it is connected via the Swanport Bridge to the Dukes Highway, which is the main road route to Victoria.

It was formerly signposted as Princes Highway, which refers to the coastal route from Adelaide to Sydney via Melbourne.

It is often referred to by South Australians simply as the freeway, as it was the first freeway in South Australia, and is still the longest, and the only one with "Freeway" in its name rather than "Expressway" or "Highway". South Eastern Freeway includes 500 m (1,600 ft) twin-tube tunnels – the Heysen Tunnels – in the descent towards Adelaide, the first of their kind on the National Highway.

== Route ==
South Eastern Freeway commences at the intersection with Glen Osmond Road, Cross Road and Portrush Road in Glen Osmond, and heads southeast as a six-lane, dual-carriageway route. As it traverses across – and through, in one section, via the Heysen Tunnels – the Adelaide Hills, and due the fact the freeway is a major freight route, it also features arrester beds and concrete median barriers, with street lighting between Glen Osmond and Crafers. The freeway narrows to four lanes just before it bypasses Crafers, and continues in a south-easterly direction, past Stirling, Hahndorf and Mount Barker, before narrowing further to a two-lane, single-carriageway, crossing the Murray River over the Swanport Bridge, to terminate just east of the crossing in Long Flat, south-east of Murray Bridge.

== History ==
Prior to the initial construction of the freeway in the 1960s, inbound and outbound road traffic between Adelaide and south-eastern South Australia or Victoria used a two-lane highway originally built in the early part of the 20th century. With growth in Adelaide's population, issues of congestion and safety mandated reconstruction. Studies began in 1962 for a freeway commencing from Crafers, that endpoint selected arguably due to the massive expenditure required with the precedent upgrade of the Mount Barker Road.

Construction began in 1965 from Crafers. The first stage of eastbound traffic lanes were opened in 1967, and the first westbound section opened in 1969. The freeway was opened in stages as construction progressed. The final section bypassing the town of Murray Bridge and connecting to the new Swanport Bridge over the River Murray opened in 1979, providing an alternative to the historic bridge in Murray Bridge.

The Adelaide–Crafers Highway extension came as a much-needed upgrade and replacement to the previous link road, the Mount Barker Road, which had been contoured to the Adelaide Hills, giving rise to many steep turns, ascending a tortuous route. The tightest hairpin turn on the Mount Barker Road was infamous as the Devil's Elbow, often the site of car and semi-trailer accidents.

On 16 May 1995, Prime Minister Paul Keating announced the construction of the new Adelaide-Crafers section. The Heysen Tunnels, named after well-known South Australian artist and benefactor Hans Heysen, were completed in 1998. Construction was completed in early 2000. In March 2000, Prime Minister John Howard opened the new road. It was the largest South Australian road project at that time, costing A$151 million, wholly funded by the Australian Federal Government.

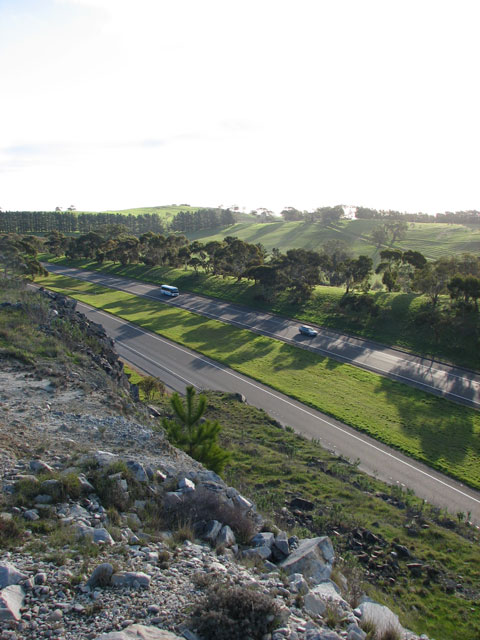
South Eastern Freeway from Mount Barker Summit

An additional exit was built at Monarto around 1999 to service an expanding commercial zone and the Monarto Zoo in the area. Another exit was announced in 2014 at Bald Hills Road, 4 km southeast of the Mount Barker interchange to service growing housing estates in southern Mount Barker and Nairne. Bardavcol started construction in May 2015, with the interchange including entry and exit ramps in both directions. The $27mil project was funded with $16mil by the Federal Government, $8mil by the Government of South Australia and $3mil from the Mount Barker District Council. The new interchange opened on 15 August 2016.

An upgrade at the Verdun Interchange began in 2026 (site testing began 2025). The upgrade allows carriageway access to and egress from both directions rather than the previous city-bound only.

The Freeway bypasses many towns previously along the Princes Highway, including:

- Eagle On The Hill
- Crafers
- Stirling
- Aldgate
- Bridgewater
- Verdun
- Hahndorf
- Mount Barker
- Littlehampton
- Nairne
- Kanmantoo
- Callington
- Monarto
- Murray Bridge

== Road safety ==
Shortly after the Adelaide–Crafers section opened, several incidents involving semi-trailers drew media attention to the road. While the previous Mount Barker Road was a notorious stretch, its dangers were well known; the new freeway presented the new challenge of a sustained continuous gradient with traffic lights at the bottom. Drivers of heavy vehicles that relied on wheel braking rather than low gear found it hard to slow down once they had exceeded a certain speed; this was made worse with brake failures due to overheating. It took some time, and the addition of several warning signs prior to the descent, for heavy vehicle drivers to become familiar with the freeway's characteristics. It was stated at the time that truck driver training did not include negotiating long downhill inclines. Semi-trailers can be seen travelling as slow as 20–30 km/h downhill. In 2005 changeable electronic road signs were installed every 200 metres, so that the speed limit of the road can be adjusted from Transport SA headquarters in Adelaide. This has both improved safety for commuters, and emergency service workers like the Country Fire Service.

In 2010 and 2011, after more incidents involving truck drivers riding the brakes down the hill, including one going into a bus stop, and another going straight through the intersection at the bottom, the government added new rules that any vehicle with 5 axles or more must stay in the left lane and must not exceed a 60 km/h limit from the interchange at Crafers to the old tollhouse. Additional signage was added to instruct the use of low gears. More safety cameras were installed in an attempt to ensure trucks abide by this new limit.

Additional signs for the two arrester beds on the descent have been added, to encourage out of control drivers to use them as a safer alternative.

In August 2014, another truck descending the hills collided with cars at the intersection of Glen Osmond Road. Two people were killed. A driver of a sewage truck lost control after passing the arrestor beds. The driver was a new employee, who had never driven a manual truck before, and had never driven any vehicle on this segment of road. Driver Darren Hicks was seriously injured and testified against employer Cleanaway at a criminal trial after being granted immunity. The prosecution, brought by Comcare, heard that the brakes on the vehicle were defective. In 2021 Cleanaway was convicted of eight charges under health and safety legislation.

== Connections ==
The Adelaide end of South Eastern Freeway leads downhill to traffic lights at the intersection of Glen Osmond Road which continues northwest as route number A1 into the Adelaide city centre, Portrush Road north to bypass the city and towards Port Adelaide, and Cross Road which leads west towards the southern suburbs of Adelaide.

The southeastern end of the freeway, near Murray Bridge, feeds onto the Swanport Bridge, a two-lane, 1-kilometre-long (0.62 mi) bridge over the River Murray, where it joins Princes Highway, a dual-carriageway highway to Tailem Bend. At this point, Highway 1 becomes a two-laned, two-way scenic route which passes through many coastal towns of South Australia and Victoria. The National Highway continues to Melbourne as Dukes Highway (A8) from Tailem Bend to the Victorian border and beyond as Western Highway.

== Exits and intersections ==
LGA	Location	km	mi	Destinations	Notes
Unley–Burnside–Mitcham tripoint	Myrtle Bank–Urrbrae–Glen Osmond tripoint	0	0.0	Cross Road (A3 west) – Plympton, Unley Park; Glen Osmond Road (A1 northwest) – Adelaide CBD, Frewville; Portrush Road (A17 north) – Northfield, Payneham, Norwood	Northwestern terminus of freeway and route M1; Route A1 continues northwest along Glen Osmond Road
Burnside–Mitcham boundary	Mount Osmond–Leawood Gardens boundary	2.2	1.4	Mount Osmond Road – Mount Osmond	Four ramp parclo interchange
Burnside–Mitcham boundary	Leawood Gardens	3.2	2.0	Mount Barker Road – Eagle On The Hill, Devil's Elbow	Southeast bound exit and north-westbound entry only
Burnside	Leawood Gardens	4.1	2.5	Heysen Tunnels northern portal	
Adelaide Hills	Crafers West	4.6	2.9	Heysen Tunnels southern portal	
Adelaide Hills	Crafers West	6.7	4.2	Mount Barker Road – Eagle On The Hill, Devil's Elbow	Northwest bound exit and southeast bound entry only
Adelaide Hills	Crafers	8.0	5.0	Mount Lofty Summit Road (B28 north) – Crafers, Mount Lofty; Waverley Ridge Road (B28 south) – Belair	
Adelaide Hills	Stirling	9.2	5.7	Mount Barker Road (B33) – Stirling, Aldgate	
Adelaide Hills	Bridgewater	13.8	8.6	Carey Gully Road – Bridgewater, Carey Gully	
Adelaide Hills	Bridgewater	15.1	9.4	Adelaide–Wolseley railway line	
Adelaide Hills	Verdun	16.9	10.5	Mount Barker Road (B34) – Hahndorf to Onkaparinga Valley Road (B34) – Balhannah, Birdwood	Southeast bound exit and northwest bound entry only
Mount Barker	Mount Barker–Littlehampton–Totness tripoint	25.2	15.7	Adelaide Road (B37) – Mount Barker, Littlehampton, Strathalbyn	
Mount Barker	Mount Barker–Littlehampton boundary	25.8	16.0	Victor Harbor railway line	
Mount Barker	Mount Barker–Blakiston–Nairne tripoint	28.9	18.0	Bald Hills Road – Mount Barker, Nairne	
Murray Bridge	Callington	45.5	28.3	Callington Road – Callington, Strathalbyn	
Murray Bridge	Monarto South	54.2	33.7	Ferries McDonald Road – Monarto, Monarto Safari Park	
Murray Bridge	White Hill–Murray Bridge boundary	63.5	39.5	Old Princes Highway (B55) – White Hill, Murray Bridge	Southeast bound exit and northwest bound entry only
Murray Bridge	Murray Bridge–Murray Bridge South boundary	69.2	43.0	Swanport Road (B35) – Murray Bridge, Swanport, Wellington	
Murray River		70.6– 71.6	43.9– 44.5	Swanport Bridge	
Murray Bridge	Long Flat–Monteith boundary	73.1	45.4	Old Princes Highway – Murray Bridge East to Karoonda Highway (B55) – Loxton, Berri	
Murray Bridge	Long Flat–Monteith boundary	73.1	45.4	Princes Highway (A1) – Tailem Bend, Pinnaroo, Bordertown, Mount Gambier	Southeastern terminus of freeway and route M1; Route A1 continues southeast along Princes Highway
Incomplete access; Route transition

== Gallery ==
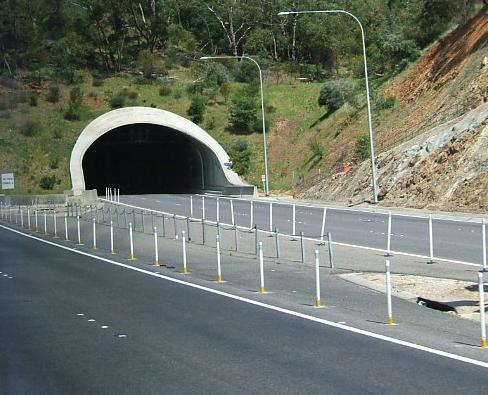
Eastern portal of the Heysen tunnels on the revamped freeway.

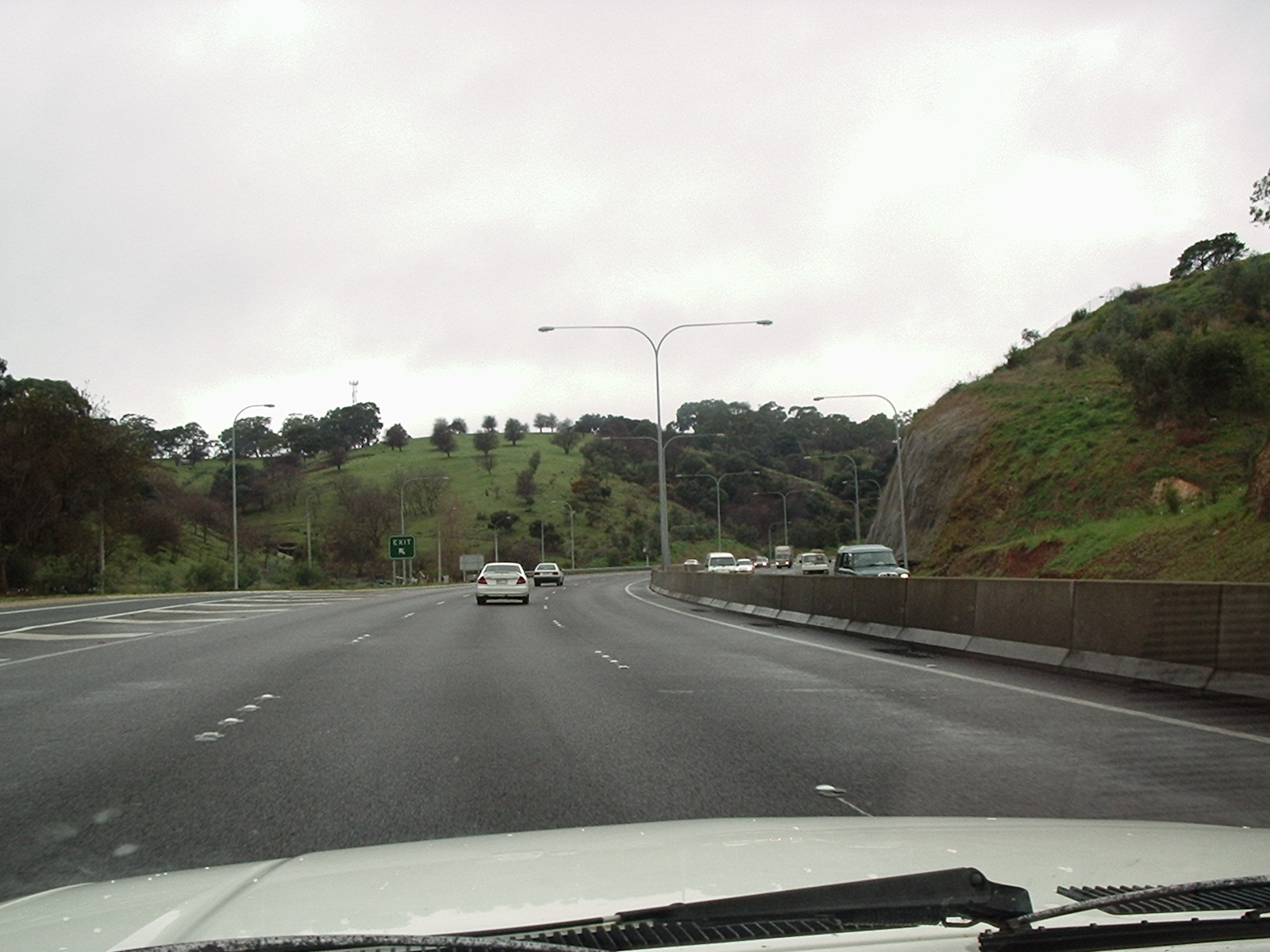
Driving towards Murray Bridge on former Adelaide–Crafers Highway.

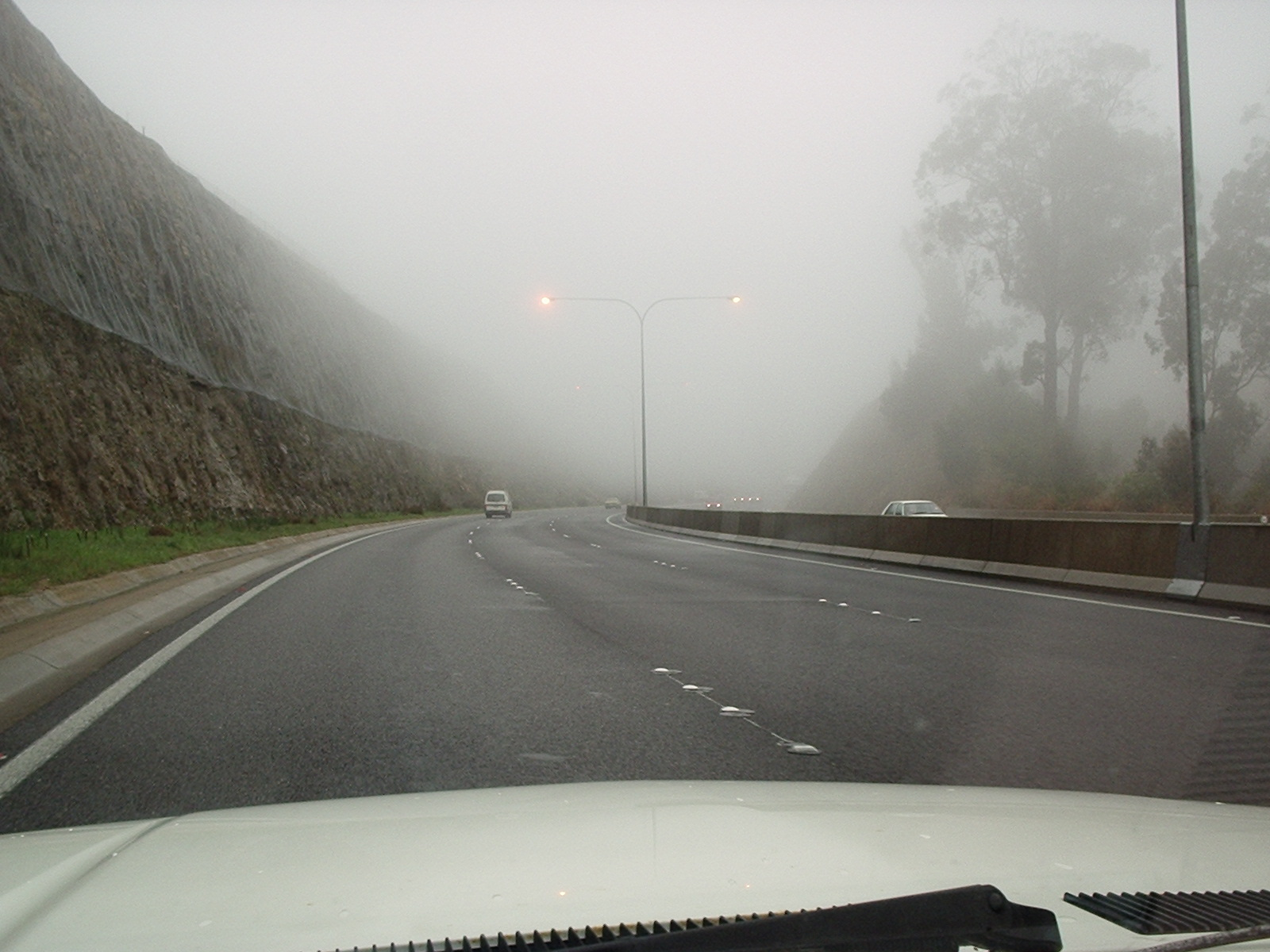
Former Adelaide–Crafers Highway on a foggy day.

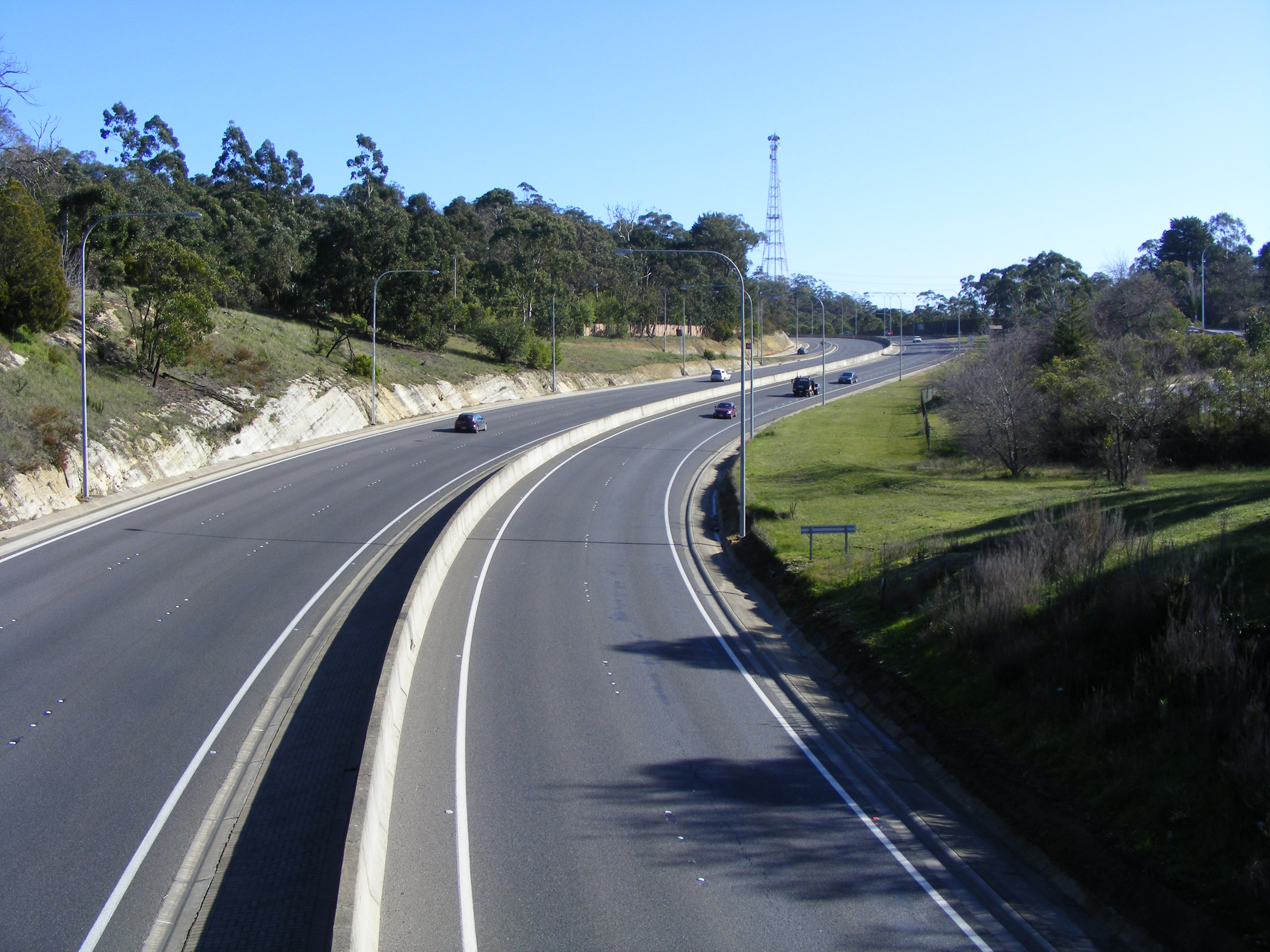
Former Adelaide–Crafers Highway at Crafers.

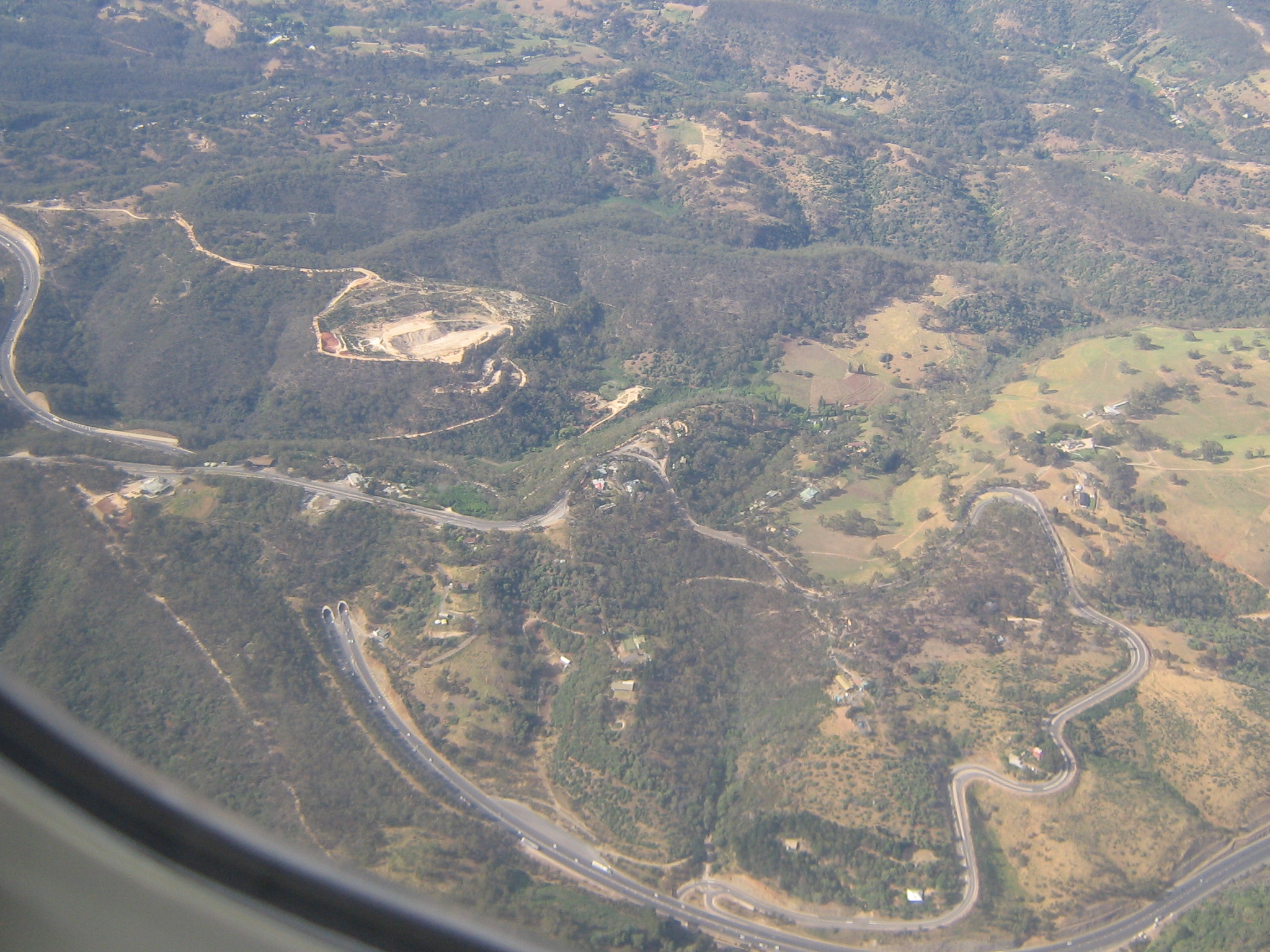
Eagle on the Hill is directly above the tunnel entrance, with the old road winding round from Devil's Elbow.

== See also ==
- Highway 1 (Australia)
- Highway 1 (South Australia)
- Highways in Australia
- Highways in South Australia
- Freeways in Australia
- Freeways in South Australia
- Metropolitan Adelaide Transport Study
