= Verdun, South Australia =

Verdun Grünthal
- Town
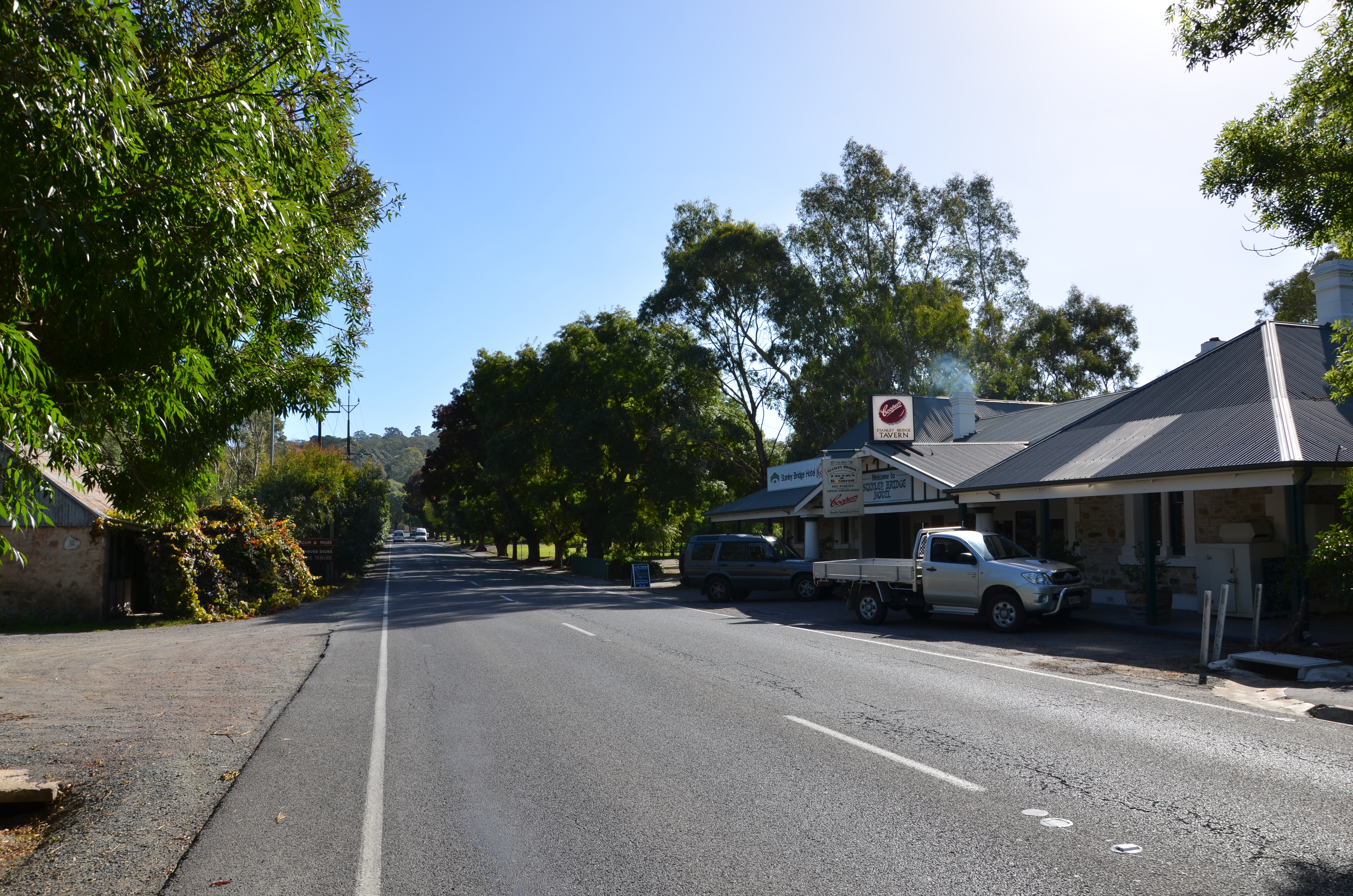
- Onkaparinga Valley Road at Verdun

- Coordinates: 35°00′0″S 138°47′0″E
- Country: Australia
- State: South Australia
- LGA: Adelaide Hills Council

Government
  - State electorate: Kavel
  - Federal division: Mayo

Population
  - Total: 235 (SAL 2021)
- Postcode: 5245

Verdun, formerly known as Grünthal (German: [ˈɡʁyːnˌtaːl]), is a town nestled in the Adelaide Hills in South Australia, Australia. It lies along the road connecting Hahndorf to Balhannah.

Situated approximately 4 km from Hahndorf and 5 km from Bridgewater, Verdun hosts a school, a pub, and a licensed café/ restaurant housed in a building formerly used as a service station and general store. Across the road from the local pub, another café thrives, while busy restaurant named Grünthal—paying homage to Verdun's original German name—resides near the freeway.

Originally known as Grünthal, Verdun was named by the Prussian settlers who founded the town. However, in 1917, the town underwent a name change in remembrance of one of the bloodiest battles of the First World War—the Battle of Verdun.

The Hills Christian Community School, established in February 1983, occupied the site of the former Verdun Primary School.

== See also ==
- Australian place names changed from German names
