= Hills Face Zone =

The Hills Face Zone is a large planning zone in Adelaide, South Australia. It restricts development in the Adelaide Foothills and Mount Lofty Ranges and extends from Gawler in the north to Sellicks Beach in the South. First suggested by the Liberal Playford Government in 1962, legislation was enacted by the Labor government that followed. Although its boundaries have been adjusted over the years (to allow for further development) it has remained largely intact.

Some of the characteristics of the original zoning restrictions were:

- Minimum property size of 4 hectares (9.9 acres)
- Maximum of one dwelling per property
- Any buildings to be sympathetic in style and colour with the local environment
