= Crafers West, South Australia =

Crafers West
- Suburb
- Coordinates: 34.99°S 138.68°E
- Country: Australia
- State: South Australia
- City: Adelaide
- LGAs: Adelaide Hills Council; City of Mitcham

Government
  - State electorate: Waite
  - Federal divisions: Mayo; Boothby

Population
  - Total: 1,307 (SAL 2021)
- Postcode: 5152
Suburbs around Crafers West
	Leawood Gardens	Cleland
Brown Hill Creek	Crafers West	Crafers
Belair	Upper Sturt	Stirling

Crafers West is a suburb of Adelaide in the Adelaide Hills Council. Located on Peramangk land, it was formally named in 1985 as a separate address from Crafers. Crafers West contains the headwaters of Brown Hill Creek and is dominated by steep terrain and native scrub. It is bounded by Mount Barker Road on the northeast and the Bridgewater railway line on the south. The Eagle Mountain Bike Park is in the north of the suburb. Popular tourist spots include Clealand Conservation Park, Mt Lofty Botanic Gardens, and Belair National Park Holiday Park.

The western part of the suburb of Crafers West is in the City of Mitcham; however, most settlement is in the Adelaide Hills Council. Crafers West is in the state electoral district of Waite and most is in the federal division of Mayo; however, the part that is in the City of Mitcham is in Boothby.

== See also ==
- The Knoll Conservation Park
- Eagle on the Hill, South Australia
