= Eagle On The Hill, South Australia =

Eagle On The Hill
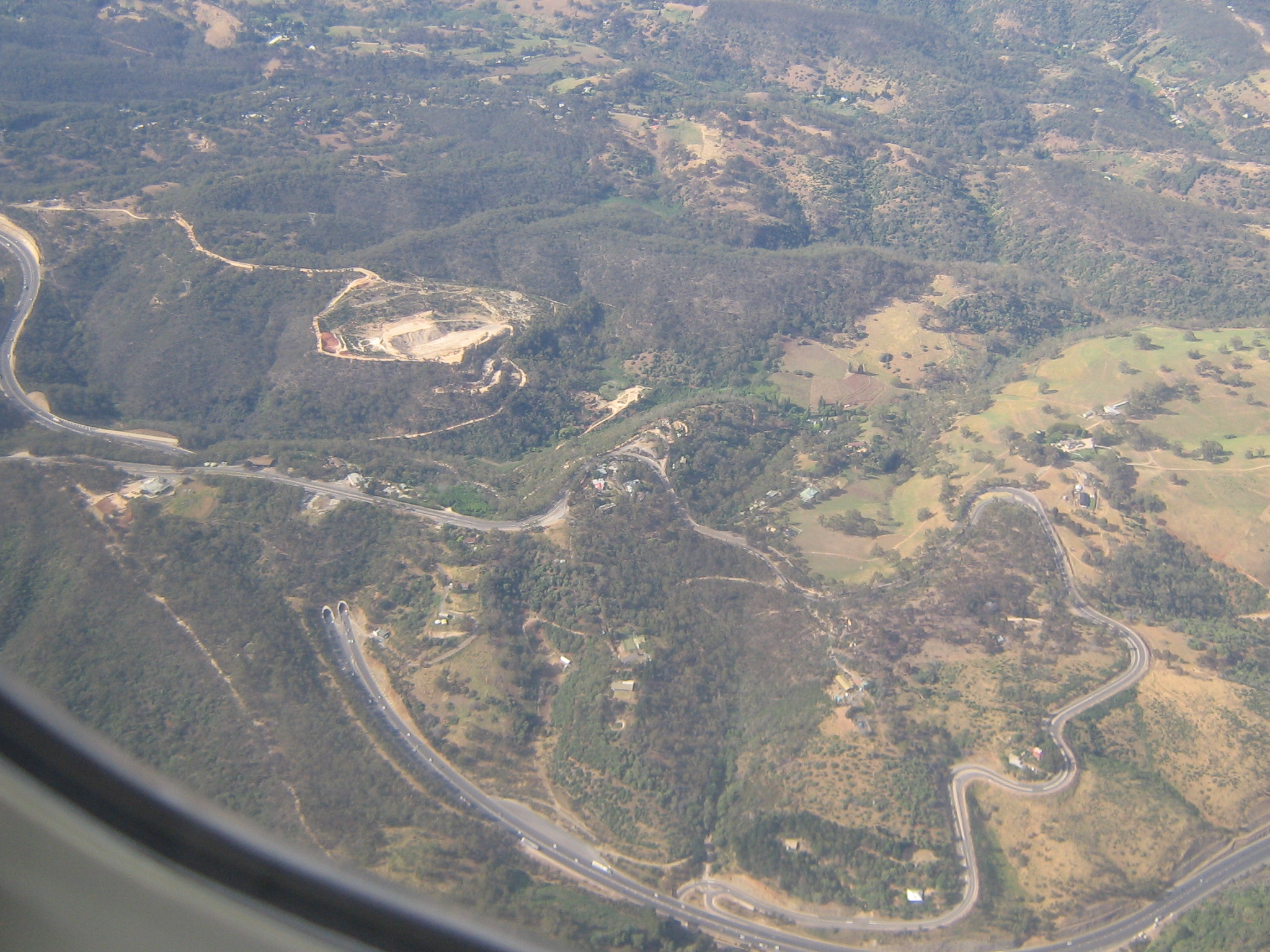
- Eagle On The Hill is directly above the tunnel entrance, with the old road winding round from Devils Elbow

- Coordinates: 34°58′41″S 138°40′20″E
- Country: Australia
- State: South Australia
- LGA: Adelaide Hills Council
- Established: 1850
Localities around Eagle On The Hill
Crafers West

Eagle On The Hill is an unbounded locality in the Australian state of South Australia located in the suburb of Crafers West on the western face of the Adelaide Hills overlooking the Adelaide metropolitan area. It is located on Mount Barker Road, which was formerly the connection from Adelaide to the South Eastern Freeway.

== Hotel ==
The Eagle on the Hill Hotel was built by George Stevenson in 1850 and initially was run as an eating-house, then opened in 1853 as a hotel by William Anderson, who named it Anderson Hotel.

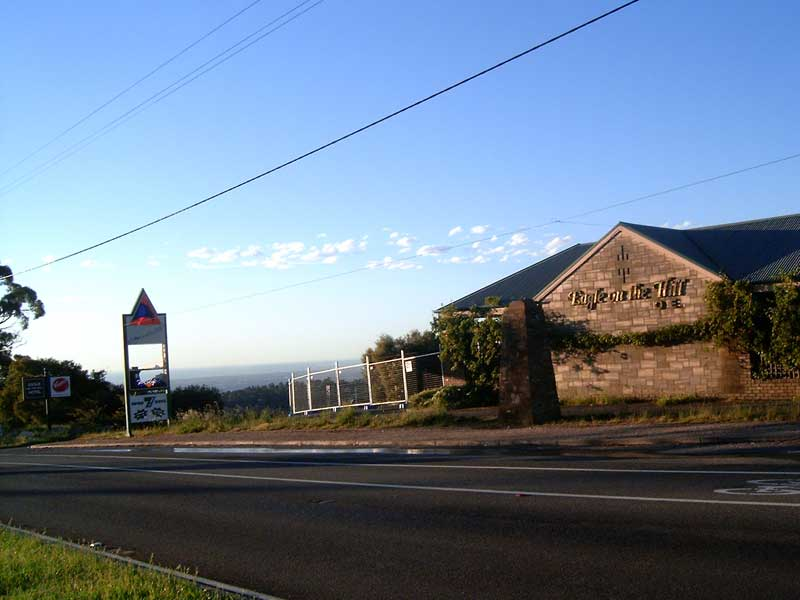
The now-closed Eagle on the Hill Hotel

Abraham Fordham was its lessee in 1854, naming it the "Eagle Inn", changing it to "Eagle on the Hill" in 1856. Fordham was found insolvent in 1861 but was able to continue trading until April 1864, when the lease on the "Eagle on the Hill" (better known as "Fordham's") was re-advertised. Fordham, who previously ran a hotel on Grenfell Street, died at the hotel the following August. His wife, Elizabeth Fordham, successfully applied for the licence, and died aged 68 at the hotel in September 1866. Their son, William Robert Fordham (died 1873), next had the licence, then transferred it to James Tighe (died 1876) in January 1869, but the association with the Fordhams continued for many years.

The hotel has twice been ravaged by bushfires. First in 1899; a fire destroyed all of the old hotel with the exception of two rooms. Again on Ash Wednesday (16 February 1983) the hotel suffered, with it being completely destroyed. It was rebuilt and operated with much success until its closure after the construction of the new freeway route which carried the South Eastern Freeway through the Heysen Tunnels instead of up the ridge past the hotel. It is now a private residence.
