= Heysen Tunnels =

Tunnels in South Australia, Australia

Coordinates: 34.974089°S 138.676072°E

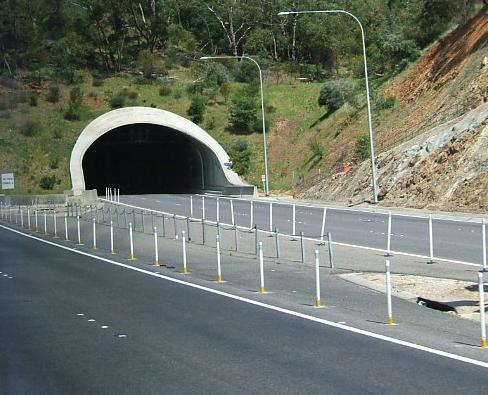
- The portal of one of the Heysen tunnels
- Interactive map of Heysen Tunnels

Overview
- Location: Adelaide Hills south east of Adelaide
- Route: South Eastern Freeway (2017-present); South Eastern Freeway (2000–2017)

Operation
- Constructed: 1998
- Opened: 5 March 2000
- Traffic: automotive, including commuters and heavy freight
- Toll: N/A
- Vehicles per day: 45,700 (2015)

Technical
- Length: 500 metres (1,600 ft)
- No. of lanes: 3 in each tunnel
- Operating speed: 90 kilometres per hour (56 mph)
- Tunnel clearance: 5.3 metres (17 ft)

The Heysen Tunnels are twin tube road tunnels which carry the South Eastern Freeway under Eagle On The Hill in the Mount Lofty Ranges in South Australia.

== Construction ==
The tunnels were excavated using a tunnelling machine normally used in heavy-duty mining operations which tunnelled through 500 metres (1,600 ft) of rock for each tunnel at an average rate of 3 metres (9.8 ft) per day. The tunnels were completed in 1998 and opened in March 2000.

== Operation ==
Each tunnel carries three lanes of traffic. As at 2015, 45,700 vehicles passed through them daily. The maximum height of vehicles permitted in the tunnels is 5.3 metres (17 ft), the same as the Crafers and Mt Osmond interchanges. Laser height detectors monitor traffic to provide warnings to drivers before they attempt to enter the tunnel.

The tunnels are named after artist Sir Hans Heysen.

== Location ==
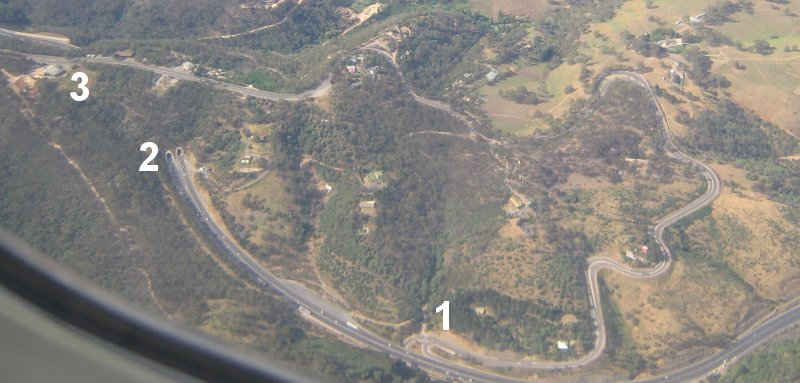
Adelaide-Crafers Highway: Eagle on the Hill (3), is directly above the Heysen Tunnels entrance (2), with the old road winding round from Devil's Elbow (1).

== See also ==
- South Eastern Freeway § History
- List of tunnels in Australia
