= Greenhill Road =

Road in Adelaide, South Australia

Greenhill Road South Australia
- Coordinates: 34.942176°S 138.582917°E (West end); 34.990082°S 138.827802°E (East end)

General information
- Type: Road
- Location: Adelaide
- Length: 27.7 km (17 mi)
- Route number(s): (2017–present) (Keswick–Glenside); (2019–present) (Glenside–Balhannah)
- Former route number: (1998–2017) (Wayside–Glenside)

Major junctions
- West end: Richmond Road; Keswick, Adelaide
- Anzac Highway; Unley Road; Fullarton Road; Portrush Road; Mount Lofty Summit Road
- East end: Onkaparinga Valley Road; Balhannah, South Australia

Location(s)
- Region: Eastern Adelaide, Adelaide Hills
- Major suburbs: Parkside, Glenside, Burnside, Greenhill, Uraidla, Carey Gully

Greenhill Road is a major road in Adelaide, South Australia, that provides a connection to the eastern and hills suburbs. Its western section, running along the south side of Adelaide Parklands, forms part of Adelaide's City Ring Route.

== Route ==
The eastern end of Greenhill Road is in Balhannah in the Adelaide Hills. It winds through Carey Gully, Uraidla, Summertown and Greenhill as a two-lane road.

In the metropolitan area, it is four lanes and passes by the City of Burnside suburbs of Burnside, Hazelwood Park, Linden Park, Tusmore, Toorak Gardens, Dulwich and Glenside until it reaches the edge of the Adelaide Parklands. The road then expands to six lanes and heads past Eastwood and the City of Unley suburbs of Parkside, Unley and Wayville as part of the City Ring Route. This section was originally designated "Park Terrace".

Greenhill Road continues west as Richmond Road from the intersection of Anzac Highway.

== History ==
The first roundabout in Adelaide was at the Greenhill/Portrush Road intersection, installed in 1952. The roundabout seemed to cause some confusion so it got removed. Today there is a traffic signal at that intersection.

== Major intersections ==
LGA	Location	km	mi	Destinations	Notes
Adelaide–Unley boundary	Adelaide–Wayville boundary	0.0	0.0	Richmond Road (R1) – Richmond	Route R1 continues west as Richmond Road
Adelaide–Unley boundary	Adelaide–Wayville boundary	0.0	0.0	Anzac Highway (A5 southwest, unallocated northeast) – Adelaide CBD, Glenelg	
Adelaide–Unley boundary	Adelaide–Wayville boundary	0.5	0.31	Goodwood Road – Adelaide CBD, Hindmarsh	
Adelaide–Unley boundary	Adelaide–Wayville boundary	1.0	0.62	Sir Lewis Cohen Avenue – Adelaide CBD	
Adelaide–Unley boundary	Adelaide–Wayville–Unley tripoint	1.5	0.93	Glenelg tram line	
Adelaide–Unley boundary	Adelaide–Unley boundary	1.6	0.99	Peacock Road (north) – Adelaide CBD; King William Road (south) – Unley Park	
Adelaide–Unley boundary	Adelaide–Unley–Parkside tripoint	2.1	1.3	Unley Road (B29 south, unallocated north) – Adelaide CBD, Belair	
Adelaide–Unley boundary	Adelaide–Parkside boundary	2.7	1.7	Hutt Road (north) – Adelaide CBD; George Street (south) – Parkside	
Adelaide–Unley–Burnside tripoint	Adelaide–Parkside–Eastwood tripoint	2.9	1.8	Glen Osmond Road – Adelaide CBD, Glen Osmond	
Adelaide–Burnside boundary	Eastwood–Glenside–Dulwich	3.7	2.3	Fullarton Road (R1 north, A1 south) – North Adelaide, Norwood, Springfield	Route R1 continues north along Fullarton Road; Western terminus of route B26
Burnside	Toorak Gardens–Tusmore–Linden Park–Glenside quadripoint	5.4	3.4	Portrush Road (A17) – Northfield, Payneham, Glen Osmond	
Burnside	Hazelwood Park–Burnside boundary	7.0	4.3	Glynburn Road – Hectorville, Beaumont	
Adelaide Hills	Greenhill–Summertown boundary	14.4	8.9	Mount Lofty Summit Road (B28) – Mount Lofty Summit, Crafers, Belair	
Adelaide Hills	Summertown	16.3	10.1	Piccadilly Road – Crafers	
Adelaide Hills	Uraidla	17.7	11.0	Basket Range Road – Basket Range	
Adelaide Hills	Balhannah	27.7	17.2	Onkaparinga Valley Road (B34) – Birdwood, Woodside, Verdun	Eastern terminus of route B26
1.000 mi = 1.609 km; 1.000 km = 0.621 mi: Route transition

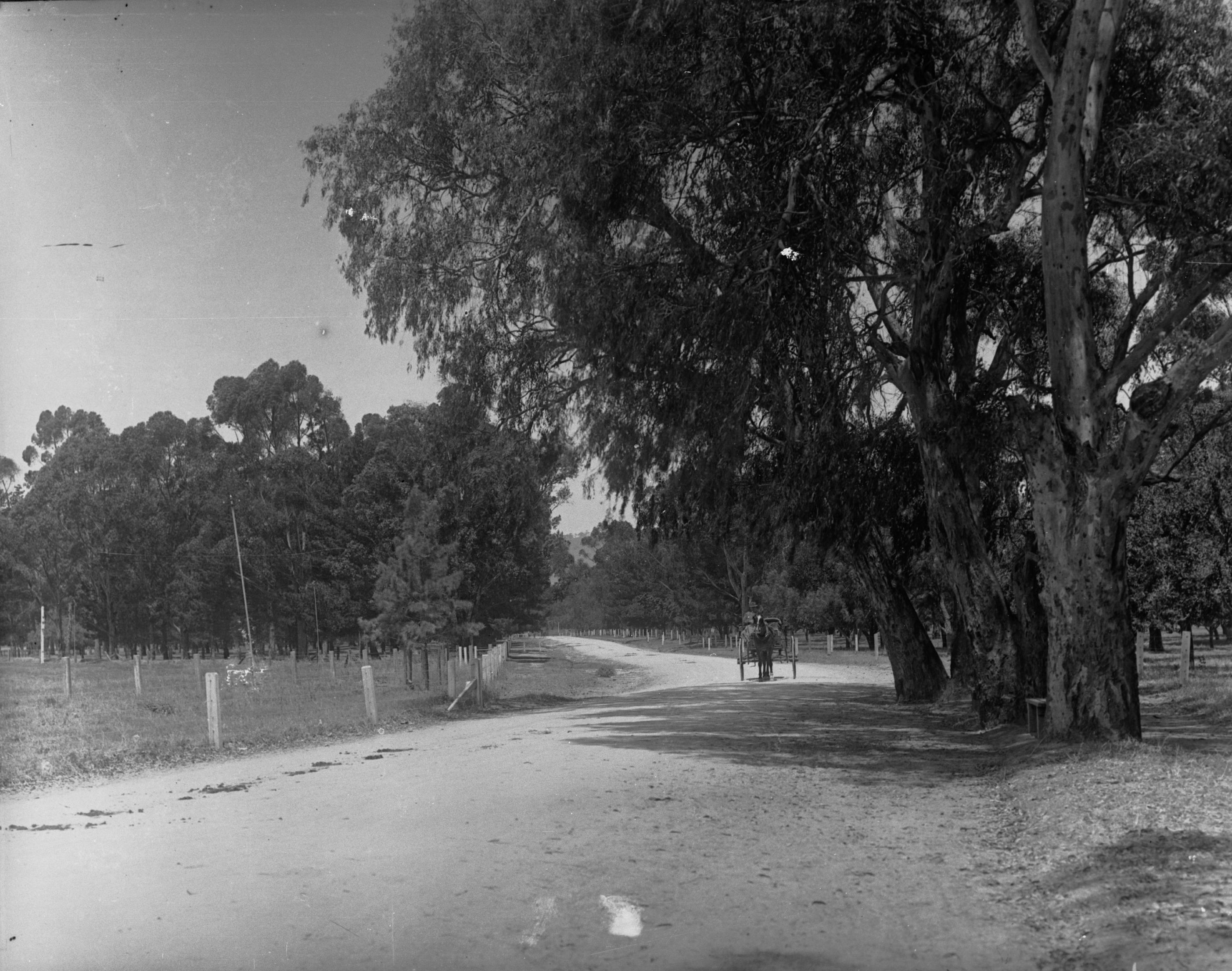
Horse and cart using Greenhill Road, 1915

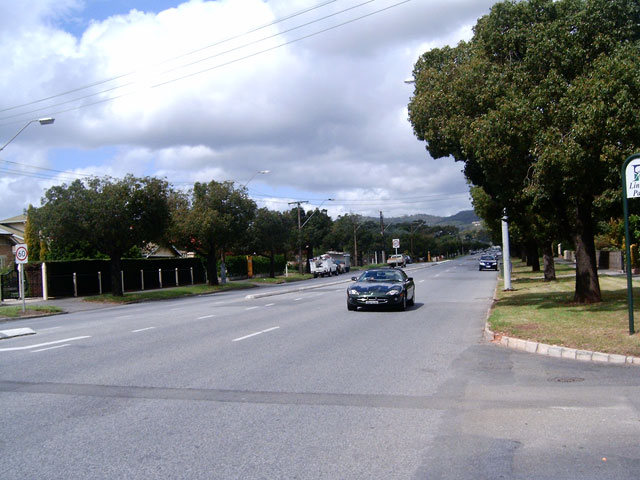
Greenhill Road near Linden Park, facing east towards the Adelaide Hills

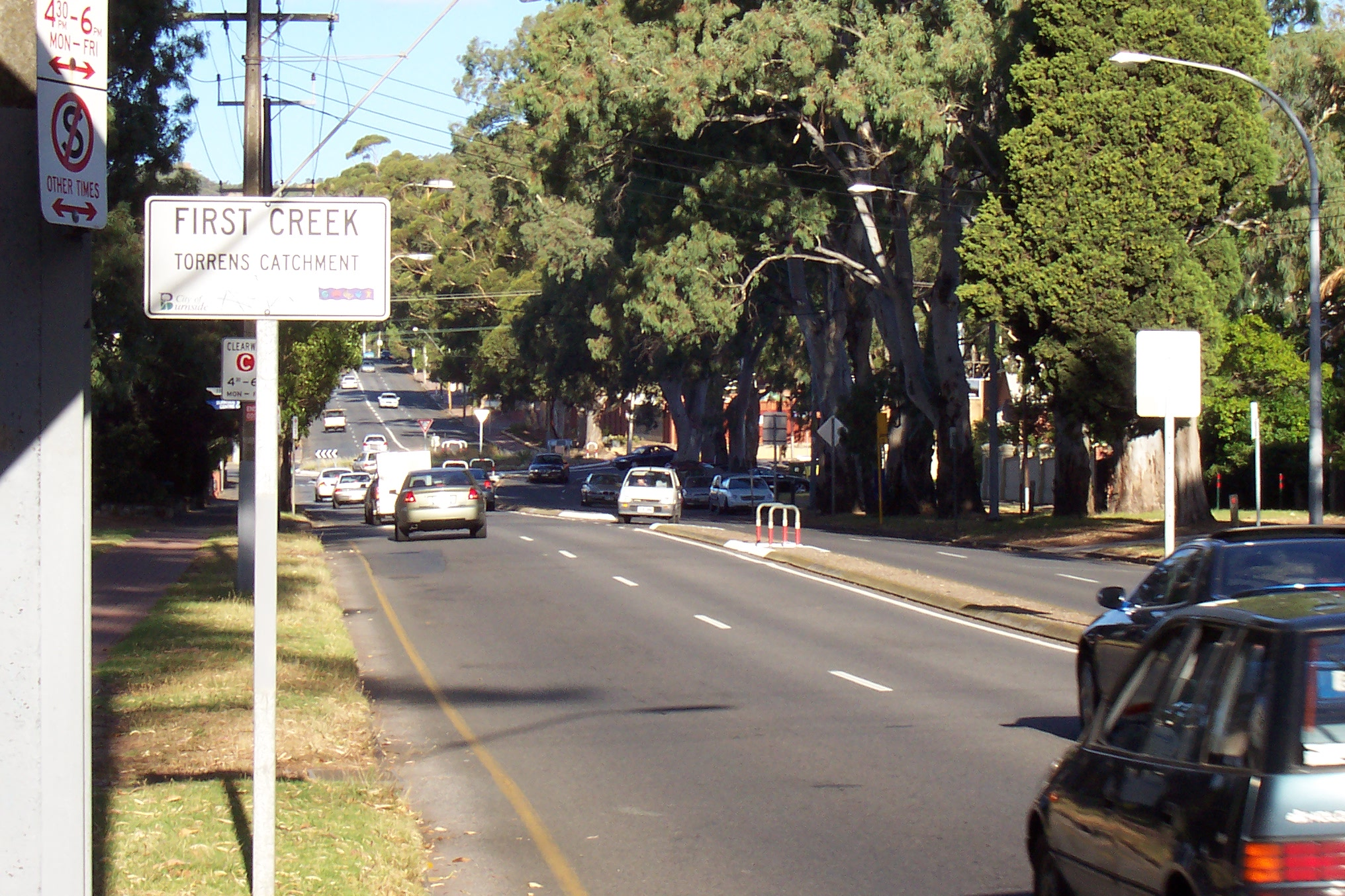
Greenhill Rd in Hazelwood Park looking toward Glynburn Road roundabout and the hills

== Tram stop ==
Greenhill Road is also the location of a stop on the Glenelg tram line.

Preceding station	Adelaide Metro	Following station
South Terrace towards Royal Adelaide Hospital, Adelaide Entertainment Centre or Festival Plaza	Glenelg tram line	Wayville towards Moseley Square
