= Eastern Courier Messenger =

Weekly newspaper

- Type: Weekly suburban newspaper
- Format: Tabloid
- Owner(s): News Limited
- Editor: Shannon Caton
- Staff writers: Emma Altschwager and Emily Griffiths
- Founded: 1949
- Headquarters: 94 The Parade, Norwood, SA, 5067
- Website: www.messengereast.com.au

Eastern Courier Messenger is a weekly suburban newspaper in Adelaide, part of the Messenger Newspapers group. The Eastern Courier's area is bounded by South Road to the west, Magill Road to the north, the foothills, and the city.

The newspaper generally reports on events of interest in its distribution area, including the suburbs of Norwood, Burnside, Wayville and Unley. It also covers the City of Unley, City of Mitcham, City of Burnside and City of Norwood Payneham St Peters councils.

It has a circulation of 62,600 and a readership of 81,000.

== History ==
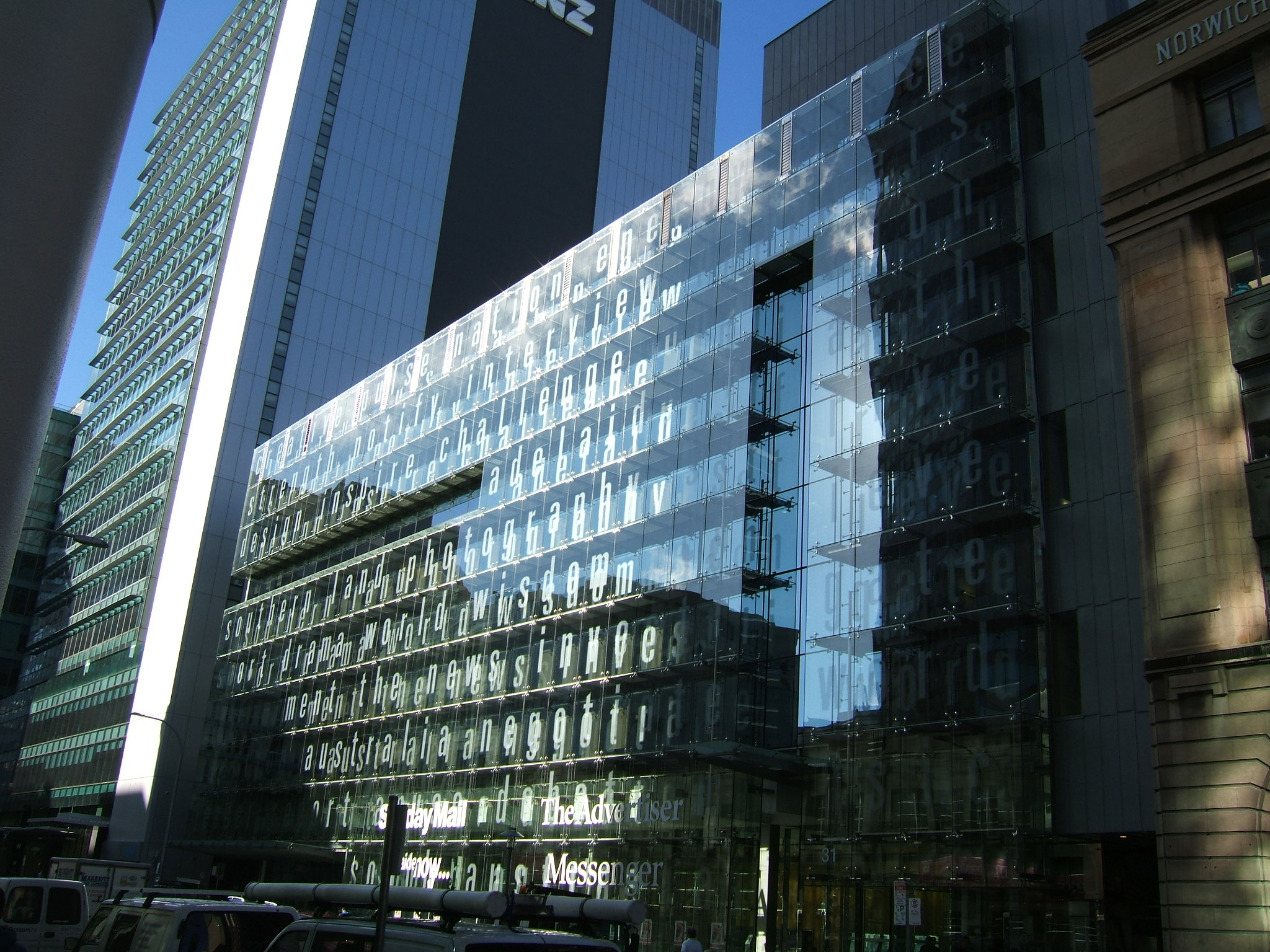
The office of the Messenger group of newspapers in Waymouth St, Adelaide

In 1949, The Courier newspaper was established in the Unley/Mitcham area. Meantime, the Eastside News Review was formed in 1961 with two editions, Burnside and Campbelltown. In 1965, the two Eastside News Review papers were merged to form the Burnside and Norwood News Review. In 1984, The Courier was renamed the Courier Messenger and the Burnside and Norwood News Review was renamed the Burnside Messenger. The Burnside Messenger's named was changed after one year to the Eastern Suburbs Messenger. In 1993, the Eastern Suburbs Messenger and the Courier Messenger were merged to form the Eastern Courier Messenger.
