= Glen Osmond Road =

Road in Adelaide, South Australia

Glen Osmond Road South Australia
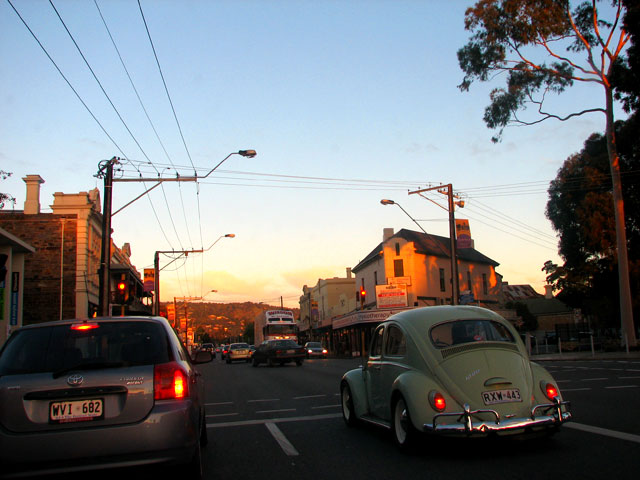
- Peak hour traffic on Glen Osmond Road
- Coordinates: 34.935352°S 138.607168°E (Northwest end); 34.963399°S 138.644006°E (Southeast end)

General information
- Type: Road
- Location: Adelaide
- Length: 4.6 km (2.9 mi)
- Route number(s): A1 (1998–present) (Fullarton–Glen Osmond)
- Former route number: National Highway 1 (1974–1998); National Route 1 (1955–1974) (Fullarton–Glen Osmond)

Major junctions
- Northwest end: South Terrace; Adelaide
- Greenhill Road; Fullarton Road; Cross Road; Portrush Road
- Southeast end: South Eastern Freeway; Glen Osmond, Adelaide

Location(s)
- Region: Eastern Adelaide
- Major suburbs: Eastwood, Frewville, Myrtle Bank

Glen Osmond Road is a major section of the Princes Highway (and Highway 1) in the city of Adelaide, South Australia. Connecting the Adelaide city centre with the Adelaide Hills via the South Eastern Freeway; Glen Osmond Road carries around 22% of freight traffic coming off the South Eastern Freeway, and is the major commuter route from the southern Adelaide Hills. It is designated part of route A1.

== Route ==
Glen Osmond Road starts at the intersection with South Terrace along the southern border of the Adelaide city centre and heads southeast, intersecting with Hutt and Greenhill Roads through the Adelaide Park Lands, continues southeast through Eastwood and Frewville, before ending at the intersection with Cross Road, Portrush Road and South Eastern Freeway in Glen Osmond.

Glen Osmond Road houses a strip shopping precinct on the section between Greenhill and Fullarton Roads. The precinct is largely populated by independent boutiques. It is a community main street stationed in the leafy suburbs of Adelaide's south east. It was earlier known as "The Gateway" because of its connection between the Adelaide CBD and Hills.

=== Glen Osmond Road Precinct Association ===
The Glen Osmond Road Precinct Association (GORPA) is an association guiding the growth and development of Glen Osmond Road and marketing the local business community. GORPA is funded by an exclusive rate applied to properties on the City of Unley side of Glen Osmond Road.

Glen Osmond Road forms the boundary of two Council areas — the City of Unley and City of Burnside. The councils work together to promote the local community. Each council has staff dedicated for Business and Economic Development.

== Major intersections ==
LGA	Location	km	mi	Destinations	Notes
Adelaide	Adelaide	0.0	0.0	South Terrace – Adelaide CBD	Northwestern terminus of road
Adelaide	Adelaide	0.7	0.43	Hutt Road – Adelaide CBD, Parkside	
Adelaide–Burnside–Unley tripoint	Adelaide–Parkside–Eastwood tripoint	1.0	0.62	Greenhill Road (R1) – Wayville, Uraidla, Balhannah	
Burnside–Unley boundary	Eastwood–Glenside–Frewville–Fullarton–Parkside meeting point	2.0	1.2	Fullarton Road (A1 north, B28 south) – North Adelaide, Norwood, Fullarton	Route A1 continues southeast along Glen Osmond Road
Burnside–Unley–Mitcham tripoint	Myrtle Bank–Urrbrae–Glen Osmond tripoint	4.6	2.9	Cross Road (A3 west) – Plympton, Unley Park; Portrush Road (A17 north) – Northfield, Payneham, Norwood; South Eastern Freeway (M1 southeast) – Mount Barker, Murray Bridge	Southeastern terminus of road and route A1
Route transition

== See also ==
- Highway 1 (Australia)
- Highway 1 (South Australia)
