= Glenunga, South Australia =

Glenunga
- Suburb
- Coordinates: 34.951°S 138.639°E
- Country: Australia
- State: South Australia
- City: Adelaide
- LGA: City of Burnside
- Location: 5 km (3.1 mi) southeast of Adelaide
- Established: 1860

Government
  - State electorate: Unley
  - Federal division: Sturt

Population
  - Total: 2,184 (SAL 2021)
- Postcode: 5064
Suburbs around Glenunga
Glenside	Glenside	Linden Park
Frewville	Glenunga	St. Georges
Fullarton	Myrtle Bank	Glen Osmond

Glenunga is an inner southeastern suburb of Adelaide, the capital of South Australia. It is located in the City of Burnside, five kilometres southeast of the Adelaide city centre. The name Glenunga is a composite of Aboriginal and Scottish words, "unga" meaning near and "glen" from the nearby Glen Osmond Bounded on the north by Windsor Road, the east by Portrush Road, the south-west by Glen Osmond Road and the west by Conyngham Street, the leafy suburb forms a rough triangular layout.

== History ==
Glenunga, along with its neighbouring suburb of Glenside, were once known as 'Knoxville'. The first European settlers of the area (in the 1840s) took up farming, and wheat grown in the area was awarded first prize in the Royal Adelaide Show. The area now occupied by Glenunga International High School and Webb Oval were previously home to slaughterhouses established in 1882. At one point, the slaughterhouses were exporting overseas and at the same time providing half of Adelaide's lamb requirements.

A number of coach companies, notably those of William Rounsevell, Cobb & Co and John Hill, were set up in the 1870s and 1880s. Up to 1,000 horses grazed the land. At this time most of the streets were beginning to be named, and most were named by the inhabitants after their original homes in England, Ireland, Scotland, Wales and the United States. However, one street was named after an Aboriginal word - "Allinga", meaning sun.

In the early 20th century, a number of businesses were located in Glenunga. The South Australian icon, the Hills Hoist, was invented by the Hill family in Glenunga. Other notable businesses were the Symons & Symons glass merchants on Windsor Road, and one involved in "Bland Radios".

A church was established in 1926, and a larger church was built in 1956 and dedicated to St Stephen. The suburb's transition from a largely rural area to a residential suburb began after World War II, with migration to the area from the United Kingdom and other countries. St. Stephen's Church was demolished in 1999, with the church community moving to the growing St. Saviour's Church in Glen Osmond. A plaque was left as a reminder of where it had once stood.

== Geography ==
The suburb is very leafy with many trees which make up for the lack of parks and reserves. There are more parks in nearby Glen Osmond, such as the popular Ridge Park. Glenunga Uniting Church is located on the corner of L'Estrange Street and Bevington Road.

== Transport ==
Public transport services to the suburb are by buses which service Glen Osmond Road every 15 minutes until 6pm, and there are other bus routes into the city, and the cross-city circle line along Portrush Road. The buses are provided by the Adelaide Metro.

However, the majority of commuters still use motor cars and Glenunga is well placed for this, bordering Portrush Road and Glen Osmond Road. Glenunga residents can reach the Adelaide CBD by various routes, and the Adelaide Hills by way of Glen Osmond Road and the South Eastern Freeway.

== Demographics ==
Historical population
Year	Pop.	±%
2001	1,794	—
2006	1,869	+4.2%
2011	1,867	−0.1%
2016	2,004	+7.3%
2021	2,184	+9.0%
Data from the Australian Bureau of Statistics

== Residents ==
The suburb is home to a number of families and retirees of predominantly Anglo-Celtic background.

== Attractions ==
Due to the small size of the suburb, there is only one main park, Glenunga Reserve, which also contains Webb Oval. More than anything else in the suburb, the Glenunga International High School brings it prominence both in Australia and overseas. The school campus is an easily identifiable part of Glenunga, being situated roughly in the middle of the suburb. The school's expansion and development have aided in the once-quiet L'Estrange Street being clogged with both traffic and students at peak hour and other times.

A number of businesses and shops are located along Glen Osmond Road and Conyngham Street. These include a McDonald's, Chinese and Mexican restaurants, and a number of small businesses and motels. Conyngham Street contains the headquarters of DECS and empty commercial blocks are waiting to undergo development.

== Politics ==
Glenunga is in the South Australian House of Assembly Electoral District of Bragg and the Federal Division of Sturt, and is a solid Liberal-voting area.
