= Frewville, South Australia =

Frewville
- Suburb
- Country: Australia
- State: South Australia
- City: Adelaide
- LGA: City of Burnside
- Location: 3 km (1.9 mi) from Adelaide
- Established: 1854

Government
  - State electorate: Unley
  - Federal division: Sturt

Population
  - Total: 896 (SAL 2021)
- Postcode: 5063
Suburbs around Frewville
Eastwood	Glenside	Glenside
Fullarton	Frewville	Glenunga
Fullarton	Fullarton	Glenunga

Frewville is a small suburb in the South Australian city of Adelaide. It is three kilometres south-east of Adelaide's central business district (CBD).

The name Frewville is taken from an early settler James Frew. Frewville is in the local government area of the City of Burnside. It has a triangular layout, bounded on the north by Flemington Street, the east by Conyngham Street, and the south-west by Glen Osmond Road.

== History ==
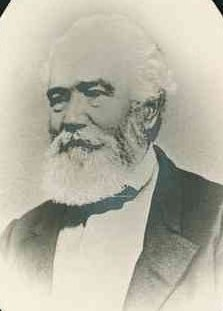
James Frew ca. 1865

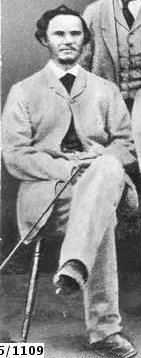
James Frew Jr. ca. 1861

Frewville was originally part of the farming land originally sold to William Giles – this land is now known as the suburb of Fullarton. In early maps Frewville is shown to be on both the north-eastern and south-western sides of Glen Osmond Road.

=== James Frew ===
James Frew (c. 1804 – 21 June 1878), his wife Jane Frew, née Fullarton (died 31 May 1878), and their daughter Ellen arrived in South Australia aboard Lady Bute in June 1839. Also on the voyage were his brothers Francis, James, and Robert.

Frew acquired part of section 265 from Giles in July 1847, and subdivided it as "Frewville" in 1865. He purchased section 252, Hundred of Adelaide, from P. V. Agnew, and in 1849 subdivided it as "Fullarton", his wife's former surname.

In 1853 James Frew paid £2,200 for the 130-acre (53 ha) allotment after Glen Osmond Road was cut through the middle of the Section.

A son, James Frew Jr (21 October 1840 – 8 September 1877) was born in Adelaide and educated at Adelaide Educational Institution. He was a member of John McDouall Stuart's 1861-1862 expedition, the first to cross the continent from south to north. He died aged 36 and was buried in the West Terrace Cemetery.

=== Frewville village ===
Frewville was originally used for the grazing of horses by the early colonists, but the village of Frewville was laid out in 1854 in Section 265. In 1855 a blacksmith set up on the corner closest to Adelaide, and the Frewville Inn was established on Glen Osmond Road.

In the next few years a weighbridge was established by the Hollard family - whose name is remembered as one of the streets in Frewville. There was at about this time a single large two-storey wooden villa house that was set well back from Glen Osmond Road. Tall pines were planted along Glen Osmond Road.

In 1881 most of Frewville was then subdivided into the property boundaries that exist today. The suburb was populated by the "new" trades-people of the day - electricians, gas-fitters and the like.

In the 1930s Frewville was "landmarked" by the unusual advertising of a car wrecking yard on Glen Osmond Road. The car body of a Model "T" Ford was wedged high up in the branches of a tree.

In the 1960s and 1970s the national freight carrier IPEC housed its main office and distribution centre at Frewville. The building has now been subdivided into offices.

On the northern side of the suburb, in the Glenside hospital, a chemical research company built a large two-storey building in Flemington Street. This building caught fire sometime in the 1980s, and now is the headquarters for the Royal District Nursing Service (South Australia), a community-based nursing service.

The McDonald's restaurant on Glen Osmond Road was one of the first McDonald's restaurants in Adelaide.

== Geography ==
The suburb is leafy with some trees which make up for the lack of parks and reserves. There are more parks in nearby Glenunga, such as the Webb Oval which is on the eastern border of Frewville.

== Transport ==
The suburb is well-serviced by public transport; buses run down Glen Osmond Road every 15 minutes until 6pm and there are numerous other bus routes in the city. The buses are provided by the Adelaide Metro. However, the majority of commuters still use cars and Frewville is well placed for this. Frewville residents can reach the Adelaide CBD by various routes, and the Adelaide Hills by way of Glen Osmond Road and the South Eastern Freeway.

== Residents ==
The suburb is home to a number of families and retirees of predominantly Anglo-Celtic background. Some of the suburb is moderately wealthy, but as one border of Frewville is Glen Osmond road, a large part of the suburb is used for commercial and retail businesses.

== Attractions ==
The main attractions of Frewville are the businesses along Glen Osmond Road - a McDonald's, Chinese and Mexican restaurants, along with a number of small businesses and motels. A prestige car company is located at the southernmost point adjacent to an office block that houses among other businesses a community television station.

== Politics ==
Frewville is in the state seat of Unley and the federal division of Sturt; both historically blue-ribbon Liberal electorates are currently represented by Labor MPs Alice Rolls and Claire Clutterham.
