= Pan-Icarian Brotherhood =

American fraternal organization

- Predecessor: Icarian Brotherhood
- Merged into: Knights and Ladies of Icaria
- Formation: July 26, 1903; 123 years ago
- Founded at: Pittsburgh, Pennsylvania
- Type: Philanthropy
- President: Damianos T. Skaros
- Vice President: Cathy Pandeladis
- Counselor: Maria Vardaros
- Website: pan-icarian.com
- Formerly called: Icarian Brotherhood

Pan-Icarian Brotherhood is a fraternal society organized on January 26, 1903 by eleven Ikarian men in Verona, Pennsylvania. The Icarian Brotherhood of America (also known as Ikaros) was finalized on July 17, 1905 with the establishment of a chapter from the State of Pennsylvania.

== History ==
Early Ikarians in North America experienced near in-humane working conditions as they worked for about sixty to seventy hours a week. These workers shared sleeping quarters with several others, taking turns sleeping as not enough beds were provided. These conditions forced early Ikarians in America to help each other and realize the need for brotherhood.

=== Icarian Brotherhood ===
On January 26, 1903, eleven men from Pittsburgh namely: Demetrios Vassilaros, Vasilios Triantafillou, John Pamphilis, Stamatis Kratsas, Emmanuel Pamphilis, Nikolaos Vassilaros, Angelo Tsantes, Anastasios Diniacos, John Lardas, Nicholas Paralemos, and John Mavrikes met for the purpose of forming an organization. The Icarian Brotherhood of America was born and the first chapter in Pennsylvania was acquired on July 17, 1905.

The organization's funds were from the dues collected on members per month which are to cover burial expenses, insurance for sick and disabled Ikarians.

=== The Artemis and Icaros ===
Ikarian's population in America increased and the brotherhood started to think of giving aid to Icarian people and started to collect funds for different projects. A rivalry and disagreement developed between the members from northern and southern Icaria as who should benefit from the group's philanthropy. The Northern Icarian members formed the Pan-Ikarian Beneficial Society “Artemis” and was officially chartered in 1910. The Artemis group focused on the construction of a harbor at Evdilos while the Icaros focused in the construction of a school building in Agios Kyrikos Each group held separate activities including the celebration of Ikaria's Independence. The rivalry existed for several years, and efforts were made to unite the two groups. The two rival groups finally united in 1916.

The Artemis group was not successful in raising funds, unlike the Icaros who had already raised funds for the school building project. At this time, the Artemis realized the importance of Icaros' school building project and started to contribute. The Artemis has evolved into a private club while the Icaros continued to flourish.

=== Knights and Ladies of Ikaria ===
In 1922, the American Hellenic Educational Progressive Association (AHEPA) was organized. Vasilios Isidoros Chebithes used his public relations skills and establish AHEPA chapters evolving the organization into the largest Hellenic organization in the United States. The non-provision of establishing a chapter in the by-laws of the Icarian Brotherhood of America, the brotherhood have not formed any chapter outside Allegheny County. Chebithes bypass this and created the Knights and Ladies of Icaria (KALOI) with the Icarians of Akron, Ohio in 1931.

=== Pan-Icarian Brotherhood of America ===
Finally in 1934, a meeting of KALOI, Icaros and Artemis were held to create a united Icarian organization. With the merging of KALOI chapters and the Icarian Brotherhood, Pan-Icarian Brotherhood of America was established.

=== Pan-Ikarian Brotherhood of Australia "Ikaros" Inc. ===
In 1958, a Pan-Ikarian Brotherhood was founded in Adelaide, South Australia, modelled after their American counterparts. In 1986 the Brotherhood purchased a hall at Arthur Street, Unley, where they continue to operate today. There is also an Ikarian brotherhood based in Sydney, New South Wales.

== Structure ==
The brotherhood's structure is similar to the American Hellenic Educational Progressive Association and other American fraternal organizations in which dues are paid by members and the organization was governed by a national governing body as elected. The membership was open to all Ikarians and Fournians (neighboring island) as per the brotherhood's constitution.

=== Chapters ===
The brotherhood now has 28 active chapters:

- Pramne - Youngstown, Ohio
- Pandiki - New York, New York
- Spanos/Areti - Detroit, Michigan
- Oinoe - Southern California
- Helios - Clearwater, Florida
- Langada - Atlanta, Georgia
- Irini - Norfolk, Virginia
- V.I. Chebithes - Akron, Ohio
- Doliche - Steubenville, Ohio
- Therma - Wilmington, North Carolina
- Nea Ikaria - Port Jefferson, New York
- Kavo-Papas - Houston, Texas
- Drakanon - Parma, Ohio
- Akamatra - Denver, Colorado
- Pharos - Cleveland, Ohio
- Icaros - Pittsburgh, Pennsylvania
- Lynchos - Northern California
- Lefkas - Washington - Baltimore
- Nisos Ikaria - Toronto, Ontario
- N'Ikaria - Northwest Indiana
- Pan-Icarian Brotherhood of Australia
- Daedalos - Warren, Ohio
- Foutrides - Chicago, Illinois
- Atheras - Philadelphia, Pennsylvania
- Christ E. Aivaliotis - Columbus, Ohio
- Ikaros of Montreal - Montreal, Quebec
- Panagia - Upstate, New York
- Pan-Icarian Brotherhood Youth

== Pan-Icarian Foundation ==
The Pan-Icarian Foundation was the charitable arm of the Pan-Icarian Brotherhood that administers the philanthropic endeavors of the organization.
