= Eastwood, South Australia =

Eastwood
- Suburb
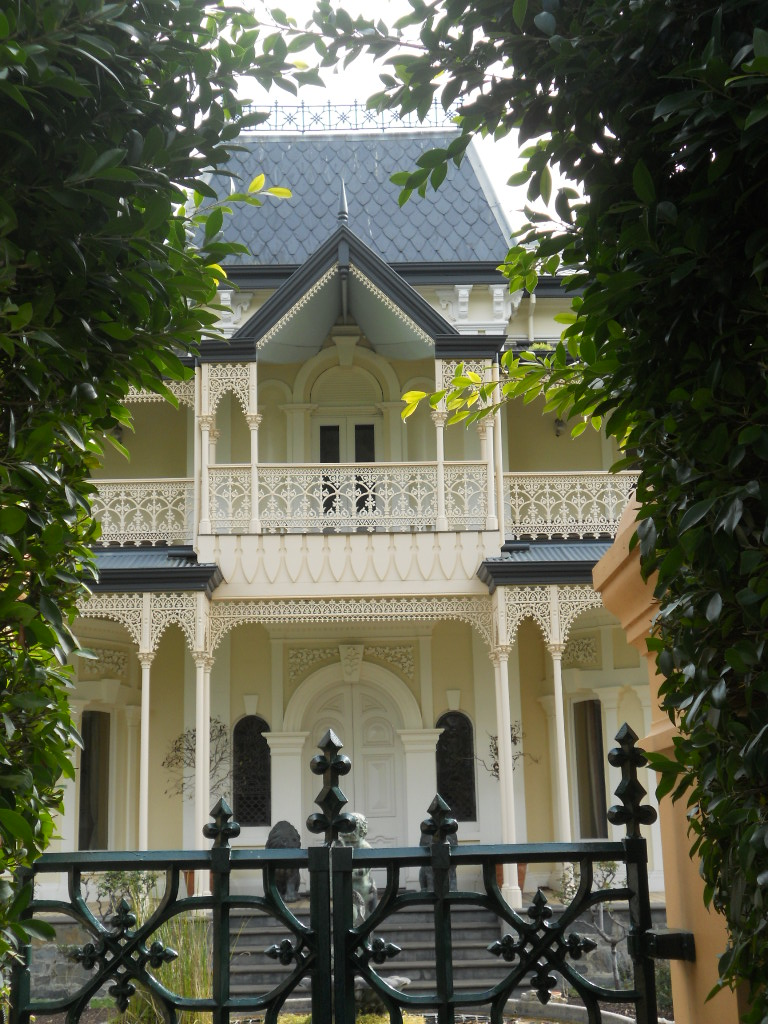
- Victorian architecture characterises a significant amount of historic housing in the area.

- Interactive map of Eastwood
- Country: Australia
- State: South Australia
- City: Adelaide
- LGA: City of Burnside
- Location: 2 km (1.2 mi) from Adelaide
- Established: 1875

Government
  - State electorate: Bragg
  - Federal division: Adelaide
- Elevation: 59 m (194 ft)

Population
  - Total: 712 (SAL 2021)
- Postcode: 5063
Suburbs around Eastwood
Adelaide Parklands	Adelaide Parklands	Dulwich
Parkside	Eastwood	Glenside
Parkside	Parkside	Glenside & Fullarton

Eastwood is a small triangular inner-southern suburb of Adelaide, South Australia in the City of Burnside.

It is bounded to the north by Greenhill Road and the Adelaide Parklands, to the east by Fullarton Road and the suburb of Glenside, and to the southwest by Glen Osmond Road and the suburb of Parkside.

Bridgestone, the largest tyre manufacturer in the world, has its Australian headquarters based in Eastwood.

== Population ==
In the 2021 Census, there were 712 people in Eastwood. 74.9% of people were born in Australia and 84.3% of people only spoke English at home. The most common response for religion was "No Religion" at 56.3%. 1.1% identify as Aboriginal and/or Torres Strait islander.

== Government ==
Eastwood is covered by the federal Division of Adelaide.

At State Government level, Eastwood is a part of the electoral district of Unley.
