= Parkside Primary School =

Coordinates: 34.9444°S 138.6198°E

- Adelaide, South Australia; Australia

Information
- Type: Public
- Motto: Seek The Best and "R.E.A.C.H" for "Respect, Enthusiasm, Achievement, Cooperation, Honesty"
- Established: 1885
- Principal: Adrianna Kyriacou
- Deputy Principal: Kylie Newbold
- Enrolment: 350
- Campus: Suburban
- Colours: Maroon, yellow and navy blue
- Website: parksideps.sa.edu.au

Parkside Primary School is a coeducational R–6 school (5–12 year olds) located in the Adelaide inner suburb of Parkside, South Australia. The school is located at 12 Robsart Street and occupies the land between Young Street, Robsart Street, Kenilworth Road and Castle Street. The school's house system consists of four teams, Yellow, Red, Blue, and Green, one for each of the four streets surrounding the school. It is one of South Australia's earliest established Primary Schools and currently has an enrolment of 360, who come from different cultural backgrounds.

== History ==
Parkside Primary School was opened on 1 April 1885. The original school building consisted of eight classrooms and had an opening enrolment of 100 students. A Headmasters house and other classrooms were constructed at later dates to account for an increased number of students. The original buildings are still in use today.

1985 was the centennial year of the school and celebrations were held throughout the year. A time-capsule was created to celebrate this milestone, to be opened in 2035.
