= Oswald Bertram Lower =

Australian chemist and pharmacist

Oswald Bertram Lower (28 February 1864 in Norwood, South Australia – 18 March 1925 in Wayville, South Australia) was an Australian chemist and pharmacist who is best known for his contributions to entomology, in particular butterflies and moths. His collection is now at the South Australian Museum.

In 1909 he married Eva Linda May (Davies) Lower. The couple had two sons: Oswald Bertram and Raymond Brackleigh.
