= Parkside, South Australia =

Parkside
- Suburb
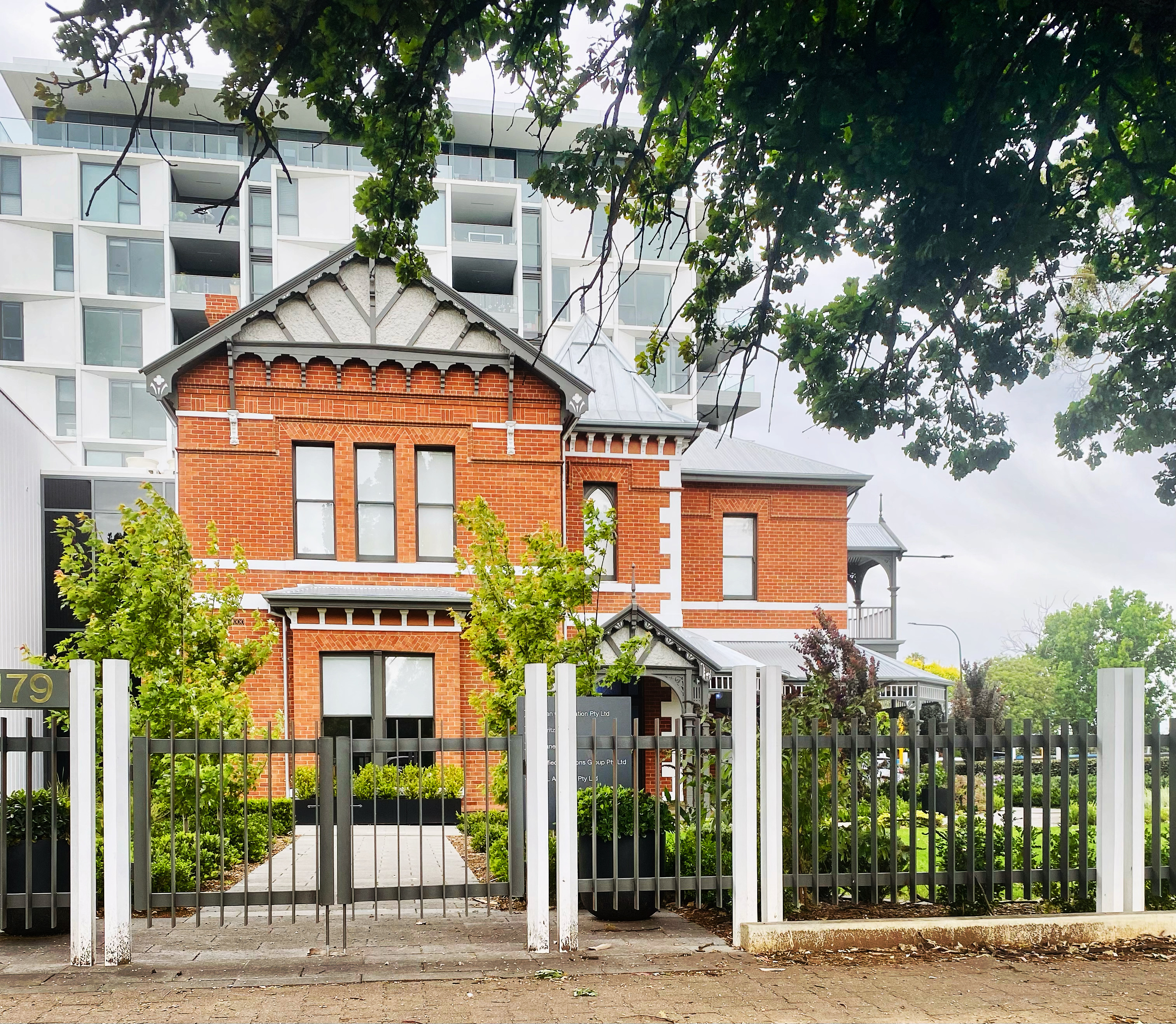
- Carramar House

- Interactive map of Parkside
- Country: Australia
- State: South Australia
- City: Adelaide
- LGA: City of Unley
- Location: 2.4 km (1.5 mi) S of Adelaide
- Established: 1849

Government
  - State electorate: Unley (2011)
  - Federal division: Adelaide (2011)

Area
  - Total: 1.63 km^{2} (0.63 sq mi)
- Elevation: 55 m (180 ft)

Population
  - Total: 5,126 (SAL 2021)
- Postcode: 5063
Suburbs around Parkside
Adelaide; Park Lands	Adelaide; Park Lands	Eastwood
Unley	Parkside	Fullarton
Malvern	Fullarton	Fullarton

Parkside is an inner southern suburb of Adelaide, South Australia. It is located in the City of Unley.

== History ==
The suburb was once home to the mental health campus of the Royal Adelaide Hospital. Known as 'The Parkside Asylum', it was the primary mental health facility in the state, and occupied approximately one-third of the suburb's area.

Parkside Post Office opened on 10 December 1859 and was renamed Eastwood in 1967.

== Geography ==
Parkside lies on the southern boundary of the southern park lands. It is bounded, among others, by Glen Osmond, Greenhill, Unley and Fullarton roads.

== Demographics ==
The 2021 Census by the Australian Bureau of Statistics counted 5,126 persons in Parkside. Of these, 47.9% were male and 52.1% were female.

The majority of residents (69.8%) are of Australian birth, with other common census responses being England (4.8%), China (2.9%), and Italy (1.7).

The age distribution of Parkside residents is comparable to that of the greater Australian population. 72.8% of residents were over 25 years in 2021, compared to the Australian average of 69.9%; and 27.2% were younger than 25 years, compared to the Australian average of 30.1%.

== Community ==
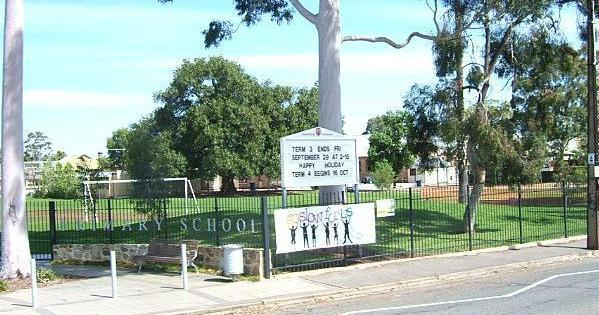
Parkside Primary School

The local newspaper is the Eastern Courier Messenger. Other regional and national newspapers such as The Advertiser and The Australian are also available.

=== Schools ===
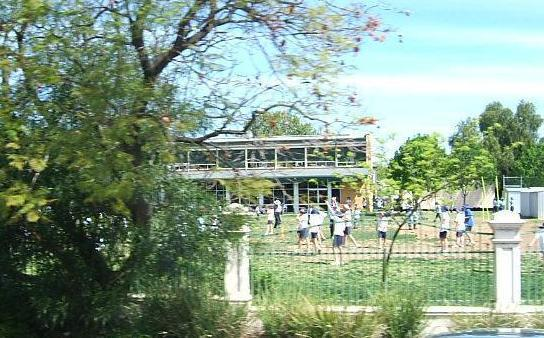
St Raphael's Catholic School

Parkside Primary School is located on Robsart Street. St Raphael's School is on Glen Osmond Road.

== Facilities and attractions ==
=== Shopping and dining ===
The suburb is within walking distance of the Unley Road shopping and dining precinct.

=== Parks ===
One of the largest parks in Parkside is Howard Florey Reserve, on the corner of Campbell Road and Fullarton Road. Henry Codd Reserve lies between Maud Street and Fuller Street and connects via a walking trail to the Leicester Street playground. There is also Mcleay Park, lying between George Street and Jaffrey Street. Most of these parks are fenced in, making them suitable for small children. All have their own playgrounds.

=== Entertainment ===
Slingsby Theatre Company, an international travelling theatrical company, is housed on Glen Osmond Road. The company seeks to "...lovingly craft original, beautiful, complex, life-affirming, heartfelt, richly rewarding, emotive and bold theatre for adults and young people...".

=== Religion ===
The Catholic Church in the suburb is dedicated to Saint Raphael.

== Transportation ==
=== Roads ===
The suburb is serviced by several main roads. Unley and Fullarton Roads connect the suburb to the Adelaide city centre. Glen Osmond Road passes beside Parkside, linking the inner southeast of metropolitan Adelaide to the South Eastern Freeway.

=== Public transport ===
Public transport in Parkside is serviced by routes 170, 171, 171A, 172 and 173, run by Adelaide Metro. Along the borders of the suburb (Glen Osmond Road and Unley Road), there are more bus services. Glen Osmond Road is serviced by routes T800, T801, T842, T863, N801, 801, 830F, 840X, 841F, 860F, 861, 863, 865, and school bus route 870. Unley Road is serviced by routes 190, 190B, 195, 195F, 196, 196F, and school bus route 674.

The Glenelg tram line is also very close to Parkside. There was once many other tram lines running south from the city down Duthy Street, terminating at Kingswood. Trams also ran along Glen Osmond Road to Glen Osmond, Fullarton Rd to Springfield, and Unley Rd to Mitcham. While these lines did not directly serve Parkside, they ran along the border, and were useful towards customers. These tramlines were operated by private companies, and later joined up with the Municipal Tramways Trust to form a larger network. The tram lines were later ripped up in the 1950's and 60's, along with many other Adelaide tram routes.

== See also ==
- List of Adelaide suburbs
