= St Georges, South Australia =

St Georges
- Suburb
- Country: Australia
- State: South Australia
- City: Adelaide
- LGA: City of Burnside

Population
  - Total: 1,726 (SAL 2021)
- Postcode: 5064
Suburbs around St Georges
Glenside	Linden Park	Hazelwood Park
Glen Osmond	St Georges	Beaumont
Glen Osmond	Glen Osmond	Mount Osmond

St Georges is a suburb of Adelaide in the City of Burnside. The suburb is mostly residential, consisting of upper-middle class residents.
