= Glenside, South Australia =

Glenside
- Suburb
- Country: Australia
- State: South Australia
- City: Adelaide
- LGA: City of Burnside
- Location: 4 km (2.5 mi) from Adelaide city centre
- Established: 1860

Government
  - State electorate: Unley
  - Federal division: Sturt

Area
  - Total: 1.40 km^{2} (0.54 sq mi)

Population
  - Total: 2,852 (SAL 2021)
- Postcode: 5065
Suburbs around Glenside
Adelaide Parklands	Dulwich & Toorak Gardens	Tusmore
Eastwood	Glenside	Linden Park
Fullarton	Glenunga	St. Georges

Glenside is a suburb in the local government area of the City of Burnside, Adelaide, South Australia. The suburb is 4.9 kilometres south-east of the Adelaide city centre, home to 2,852 people in a total land area of 1.40 km^{2}.

It is bordered on the north by Greenhill Road, on the east by Portrush Road, on the south by Flemington Street and Windsor Road and the west by Fullarton Road. The suburb has a rectangular layout. A number of residential streets in the suburb contain avenues of jacaranda trees, which provide a lush purple colour when they flower in Spring.

== History ==
Glenside, along with its neighbouring suburb of Glenunga were originally known by the name of 'Knoxville'. They were first settled in the 1840s as farming land, and wheat grown in the area was awarded first prize in the Royal Adelaide Show. The area now taken up by Glenunga International High School and Webb Oval, was previously home to slaughterhouses established in the nineteenth century. At one point, the slaughterhouses were exporting overseas and at the same time providing half of Adelaide's lamb requirements.

In 1846 the Public Colonial Lunatic Asylum of South Australia was founded at the site of the present-day Glenside hospital. The site has been used almost-continuously since then as a public mental health facility, although its present form occupies a much smaller area than in the twentieth century. In September 2007, following a review of mental health services in South Australia by Social Inclusion Commissioner Monsignor David Cappo, a major redevelopment of the Glenside hospital site was announced. The redevelopment included a new 129 bed specialist psychiatric hospital that was opened on 2012. The Victorian-era hospital buildings were also refurbished as part of the construction of the new South Australian Film Corporation studios, which were opened in October 2011. Much of the remaining unused original hospital site was sold into private hands in 2014.

A number of coach companies, notably Cobb & Co and those of William Rounsevell, and John Hill were set up in the 1870s and 1880s. Up to 1000 horses grazed the land. At this point, most of the streets were beginning to be named. Most were named by the inhabitants at the time, usually in reference to their original homes in Ireland, England, Scotland, Wales and the United States. However, one street was named after an Aboriginal Word - "Allinga", meaning sun.

In the early twentieth century, a number of businesses started locating themselves in Glenside. The Australian icon, the Hills Hoist clothes line, was invented by the Hill family in neighbouring Glenunga. Other notable businesses were the Symons & Symons glass merchants and one involved in "Bland Radios".

== Demography ==
At the 2021 Australian Census, the suburb was home to a population of 2,852, with 46.4% male and 53.1% female. The median age of the residents was 43 years old, two years older than the state median age, and five years older than the national median age. The five most common ancestries in Glenside were noted as English (30.3%), Australian (20.9%), Chinese (15.3%), Scottish (7.9%), and Irish (6.7%).

The suburb contains three retirement communities: Victoria Grove and Pineview Village on Greenhill Road, and Glenbrook on L'Estrange Street.

== Geography and built environs ==
The suburb is home to Glenside Health Services, a primary mental health facility in the state, on the site of the old Glenside Hospital. Originally established in March 1870 as Parkside Lunatic Asylum, it once occupied approximately one-third of the area of the suburb. Areas were gradually sold for other purposes, with 12 hospital structures being heritage-listed and refurbished for other uses. The South Australian Film Corporation has since taken over a redeveloped portion of the former hospital property as its headquarters following a move from the former studio at Hendon in the north-western suburbs of Adelaide. The new studio includes office accommodation and facilities for film production.

The Burnside Village shopping centre is located in Glenside, on the corner of Greenhill and Portrush Roads, serving much of the City of Burnside council area in addition to Glenside.

Between 1990 to 2024, Glenside was home to South Australia's only orthodox Jewish synagogue, the Adelaide Hebrew Congregation. Many of Adelaide's Jewish community live nearby in the eastern suburbs in order to walk to the synagogue on Sabbath or other holy days. The synagogue shared a campus with the Jewish Day School, Massada College, until the school's closure in 2011. The congregation has now relocated to a new site on Grote Street in the CBD.

Although most of the rest of Glenside is residential, there are offices related to mining, veterinary health, primary industries and health services along Flemington and Conyngham Streets and a variety of food and service businesses along Greenhill Road.

There are several parks in Glenside as well as the Conyngham Street Dog Park for dog exercise. Symons & Symons reserve, named for a well-known glassmaker who lived and worked in the area in the mid 1900s, is located on the corner of Conyngham and Cator Street. Plane Tree Reserve is located on Cedar Crescent and Plane Tree Avenue. Glenside Olive Reserve, a landscape relic of the former olive grove, is accessible from Amber Woods Drive. Glenunga Reserve is also located on Conyngham Street in the adjacent suburb of Glenunga.

== See also ==
- Glenside Hospital
- List of Adelaide suburbs
