= Unley, South Australia =

Unley
- Suburb
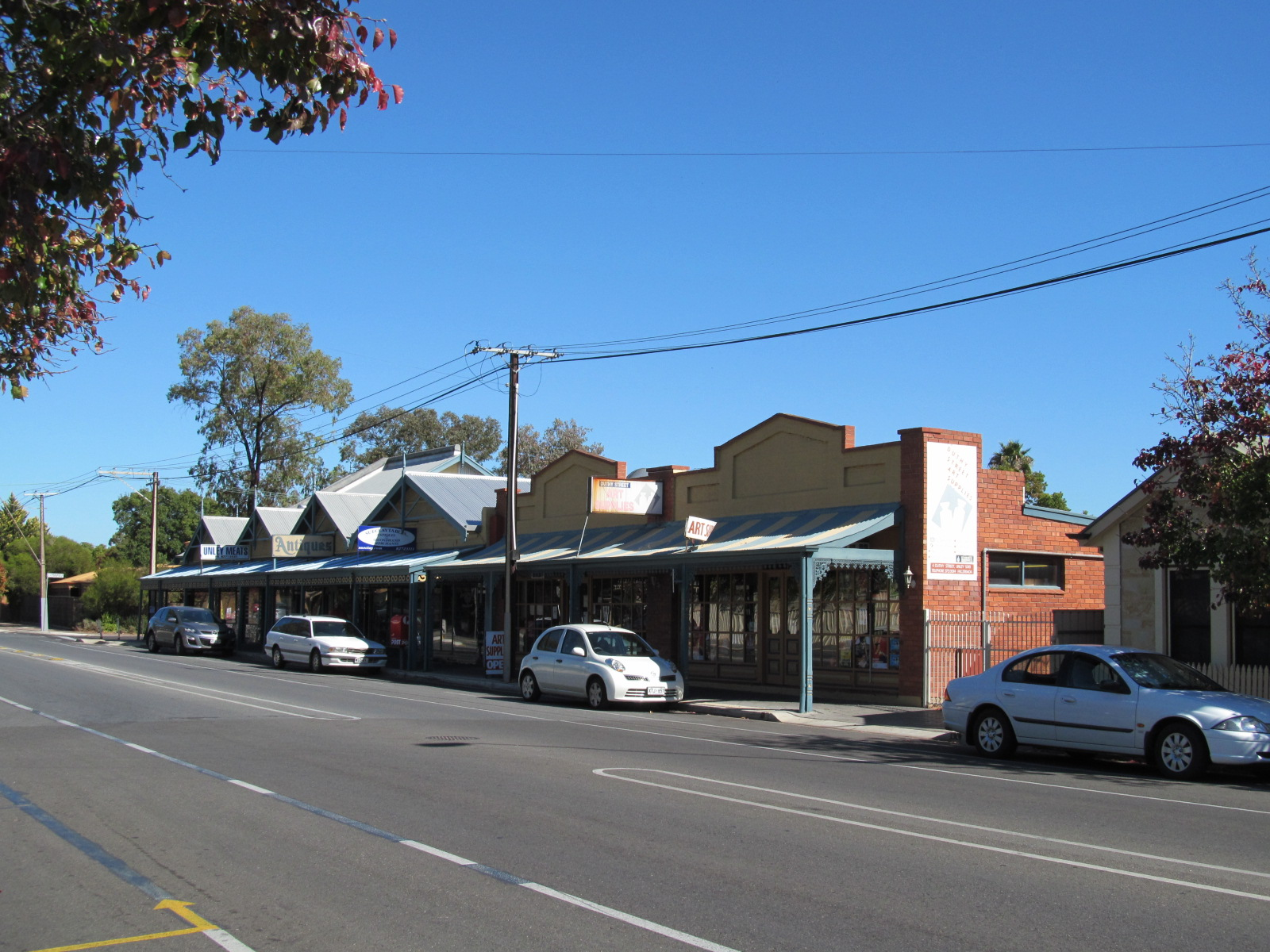

- Interactive map of Unley
- Country: Australia
- State: South Australia
- City: Adelaide
- LGA: City of Unley
- Location: 2 km (1.2 mi) S of Adelaide
- Established: 1840

Government
  - State electorate: Unley
  - Federal division: Adelaide
- Elevation: 49 m (161 ft)

Population
  - Total: 3,997 (SAL 2021)
- Postcode: 5061
Suburbs around Unley
Adelaide; Parklands	Adelaide; Parklands	Adelaide; Parklands
Wayville; Goodwood	Unley	Parkside; Fullarton
Millswood	Hyde Park Malvern	Malvern

Unley is an inner-southern suburb of Adelaide, South Australia, within the City of Unley. The suburb is the home of the Sturt Football Club in the South Australian National Football League (SANFL). Unley neighbours Adelaide Park Lands, Fullarton, Hyde Park, Malvern, Parkside and Wayville.

The boundaries of Unley are Greenhill Road (north), Unley Road, Maud Street and Windsor Street (east), Cremorne Street and Opey Avenue (south) and King William Road (west).

Unley is the family name of the wife of Thomas Whistler, owner of land in Unley which was laid out around 1857.

== History ==
Prior to British colonisation of South Australia, Unley was home to the Aboriginal nation known as the Kaurna, or Adelaide Plains tribe. Settlement by colonists began in the mid-19th century, with arrivals predominantly from United Kingdom of Great Britain and Ireland, and to a small extent German speaking lands. At this time a small number of other ethnic groups also appeared. The land was cleared of native forest to farm sheep and cattle and to plant vineyards and orchards.

Unley Post Office opened on 17 January 1850.

North Unley refers to an obsolete suburb name which was officially discontinued before 1994.

The Glenelg tram line passes the northwest corner of the suburb and another line went along Unley Road until the 1950s.

== Historic buildings ==
=== Goodwood Institute ===
Goodwood Institute

The Goodwood Institute was built in 1928, and now houses the Goodwood Theatre & Studios, a multi-purpose venue for the performing arts and music. Independent Theatre, an amateur theatre company run by Rob Croser, uses the venue for many of its performances.

In 2020 the building was bought by Chris Iley, who had managed the venue since 2014, and his partner Simone Avramidis, after a potential buyer had wanted to convert the building into apartments. In July 2026, they sold the building to new buyers, under a contract specifying that it would be used for community use for 99 years.

As of November 2026, Red Phoenix Theatre has its home at Goodwood Theatre, having moved from Holden Street Theatres.

=== Others ===
The Ikaros Hall, formerly a Masonic Temple erected in 1927, is situated in Arthur Street, and home of the Pan-Ikarian Brotherhood of Australia, a Greek Australian diaspora community organisation founded by migrants from the island of Ikaria.

== Contemporary Unley ==
Unley has developed into a commercial hub just south of Adelaide's city centre. The suburb also has a significant Greek Australian population, while the Roman Catholic Church of the Resurrection, in the north of the suburb, conducts services in English and Polish.

== Demographics ==
Population	2016	%	2021	%	% change
Total	4,006		3,997		0.2%
by Gender
Females	2,045	51.0%	2,066	51.8%	+ 1.0%
Males	1,965	49.0%	1,924	48.2%	2.1%
by Age Group
0–4	206	5.1%	163	4.1%	-20.9%
5–14	390	9.8%	435	10.9%	+11.5%
15–24	523	13.1%	433	10.9%	-17.2%
25–54	1,751	43.7%	1,684	42.2%	3.8%
55–64	472	11.8%	484	12.1%	+ 2.5%
65+	660	16.5%	723	18.1%	+ 9.5%
by Country of Birth
Australia	2,752	68.7%	2,802	70.1%	+ 1.8%
England	176	4.4%	181	4.5%	+ 2.8%
China	148	3.7%	130	3.3%	-12.2%
Greece	103	2.6%	78	2.0%	-24.3%
Italy	88	2.2%	75	1.9%	-14.8%
India	64	1.6%	82	2.1%	+28.1%

Dwellings	2016	%	2021	%	% change
Total dwellings	1,969		1,953		0.8%
Occupied dwellings	1,678		1,735		+ 3.4%
by Dwelling Type
Separate house	879	52.4%	903	52.0%	+ 2.7%
Semi-detached, row	358	21.3%	350	20.2%	2.2%
Flat, unit, etc.	438	26.1%	471	27.1%	+ 7.5%
by Ownership
Fully owned	581	34.5%	604	34.8%	+ 4.0%
Purchasing	452	26.8%	471	27.1%	+ 4.2%
Rented	617	36.6%	617	35.6%	+ 0.0%

== Notable residents ==
- Greg Chappell (born 1948 in Unley), cricketer
- Ian Chappell (born 1943 in Unley), cricketer
- Seth Ferry (1839–1932), racehorse owner and trainer, had racing stables and fox hunting kennels at the corner of Unley Road and Commercial Road.
- John Lorenzo Young (1826–1881), founder of the Adelaide Educational Institution, had his school and adjacent residence on Young Street.

== See also ==
- List of Adelaide suburbs
