= City of Burnside =

Coordinates: 34°56′S 138°40′E

- Local government area
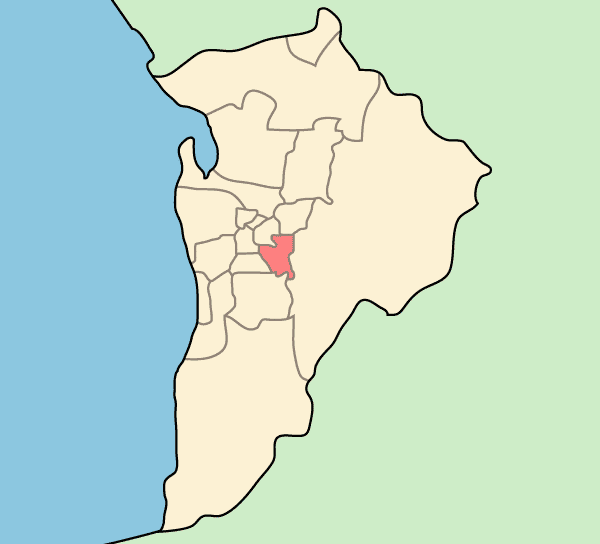

- Interactive map of City of Burnside
- Country: Australia
- State: South Australia
- Region: Eastern Adelaide
- Established: 1856
- Council seat: Tusmore

Government
  - Mayor: Anne Monceaux
  - State electorate: Adelaide, Bragg, Dunstan, Morialta, Hartley, Heysen
  - Federal division: Adelaide, Sturt

Area
  - Total: 27.53 km^{2} (10.63 sq mi)

Population
  - Total: 46,030 (LGA 2021)
  - Density: 1,672/km^{2} (4,330/sq mi)
- Website: City of Burnside
LGAs around City of Burnside
Adelaide	Norwood Payneham St Peters	Campbelltown
Unley	City of Burnside	Adelaide Hills
Mitcham	Mitcham	Adelaide Hills

The City of Burnside is a local government area in the South Australian city of Adelaide stretching from the Adelaide Parklands into the Adelaide foothills with an area of 2,753 hectares (6,800 acres). It was founded in August 1856 as the District Council of Burnside, the name of a property of an early settler, and was classed as a city in 1943. The LGA is bounded by Adelaide, Adelaide Hills Council, Campbelltown, Mitcham, Norwood Payneham and St Peters and Unley.

A primarily residential upper middle class area, Burnside has little to no industrial activity and a small commercial sector. Over 257 hectares (640 acres) of its area is dedicated to Parks and Reserves, the result being one of the greenest areas in Adelaide.

It was one of the first areas outside of Adelaide to be settled, with the early villages of Magill, Burnside, Beaumont and Glen Osmond now inner suburbs.

At the 2021 census, City of Burnside was considered the most relatively socio-economically advantaged LGA in South Australia, and the suburb of Skye the third most advantaged locality in the state (behind nearby Springfield and Mount George), according to the Australian Bureau of Statistics' SEIFA indexes.

== History ==
Prior to the British colonisation of South Australia in 1836, Burnside was inhabited by the Kaurna, an Aboriginal people who lived around the creeks of the River Torrens during the summer months and in the Adelaide Hills during the wintertime. The area was first settled in 1839 by Peter Anderson, a Scots migrant, who named it Burnside after his property's location adjacent to Second Creek (in Scots, "Burn" means creek or stream). The Village of Burnside was established shortly thereafter and the District Council of Burnside was gazetted in 1856, being separated from the larger East Torrens Council. The council's first chairman was Dr. Christopher Rawson Penfold, of Penfolds Wines fame.

The present Council Chambers were built in 1927/28 in Tusmore, with the council becoming a municipality in 1935. With strong growth and development throughout the region, Burnside was then proclaimed a city in 1943. The 1960s brought Burnside Library, built next to the Council chambers, and the George Bolton Swimming Centre in Hazelwood Park. Both were further expanded and upgraded between 1997 and 2001.

Beaumont House, a historic structure, was constructed for the first bishop of Adelaide, Augustus Short, during 1851. Wineries, mining and olive groves were the mainstay of an early Burnside economy; Glen Osmond boasted substantial mineral deposits and world-class vineyards were established at Magill. The first council chamber was designed by chairman George Soward and built in 1869 by Thomas Hill and William Yateman.

== Geography and environment ==
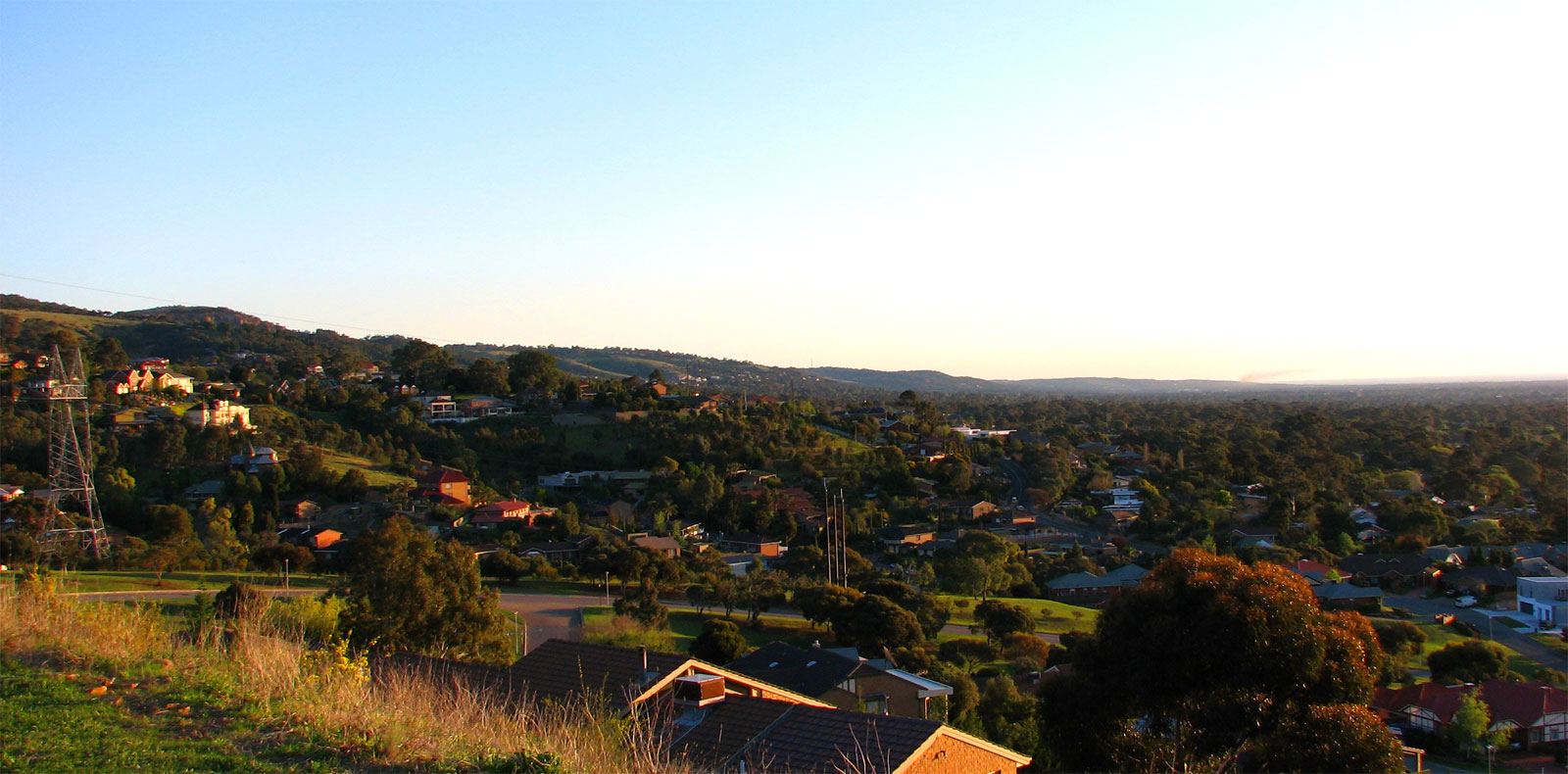
The Adelaide Foothills, facing south, from Magill

Burnside has an area of 2,753 hectares (6,800 acres) and is located from the east to the south-east of the Adelaide city centre and parklands, extending east to the Cleland National Park in the Mount Lofty Ranges. Two creeks of the River Torrens run through a gradually sloping plain from the ranges; there is much variation in land use and topography.

Before European Settlement in South Australia, much of the Adelaide Plains were swamps and woodland. In what became Burnside, plains leading out to Unley hosted the large Black Forest of grey box woodland. To the north and the floodplains of First and Second Creeks, there were blue gums and River Red Gums. Nearer to the foothills, in Mount Osmond and Waterfall Gully, a more diverse range of plant species existed, however manna gums and blue gums were predominant. With colonisation, much of the native foliage was cut down to enable crops and grazing. Market Gardens in the Adelaide Hills lowered the amount of water flowing down the creeks and some of the Hills Face was used for quarrying. Early crops included olives, grapes for winemaking, wheat and barley. Over the years agriculture greatly declined and only vineyards survive today in Magill and Waterfall Gully.

With new suburbs being gazetted in the 20th century, the Burnside Council undertook ambitious tree-planting, beautification and conservation schemes to slow and then reverse the negative impact on the natural environment. 190 hectares (470 acres) of the council area is held in reserves and parks and some 35,000 trees line the streets. A "Second Generation Tree Planting Program" started in 1993. The council launched its Urban Tree Strategy in 2014, with a strategic plan covering the period to 2025. In February 2020, it won a Tree Cities of the World designation from the Food and Agriculture Organization of the United Nations and Arbor Day Foundation. It was one of three suburban Adelaide councils to be awarded the designation, along with the City of Mitcham and the City of Unley, which as of July 2020 are the only three in Australia.

Notable parks and reserves include Chambers Gully, Langman Reserve and Hazelwood Park.

== Council ==
Council consists of 13 Elected Members comprising a Mayor, and 12 Ward Councillors. The Council area is divided into six wards, with two Councillors elected from each ward. The wards are as follows:

- Beaumont Ward (Beaumont, Leawood Gardens, Linden Park, Mount Osmond, St Georges and Waterfall Gully)
- Burnside Ward (Burnside, Erindale, Stonyfell and Wattle Park)
- Eastwood & Glenunga Ward (Eastwood, Frewville, Glen Osmond, Glenside and Glenunga)
- Kensington Gardens & Magill Ward (Auldana, Kensington Gardens, Magill, Rosslyn Park and Skye)
- Kensington Park Ward (Beulah Park, Hazelwood Park, Kensington Park and Leabrook)
- Rose Park & Toorak Gardens Ward (Dulwich, Rose Park, Toorak Gardens and Tusmore)

The current council as of November 2022 is:

Ward	Party Affiliation	Councillor	First elected	Notes
Mayor	Independent	Anne Monceaux	2010	
Beaumont Ward	Independent	Paul Huebl	2018	
Beaumont Ward	Liberal	Harvey Jones	2018	
Burnside Ward	Independent	Mike Daws	2018	
Burnside Ward	Independent	Jenny Turnbull	2018	
Eastwood & Glenunga Ward	Independent	Ted Jennings	2022	
Eastwood & Glenunga Ward	Liberal	Di Wilkins	2003	
Kensington & Magill Ward	Independent	Kerry Hallett	2022	
Kensington & Magill Ward	Independent	Jo Harvey	2022	
Kensington Park Ward	Labor	Jane Davey	2003	
Kensington Park Ward	Independent	Andy Xing	2022	
Rose Park & Toorak Gardens Ward	Independent	Peter Cornish	2010	
Rose Park & Toorak Gardens Ward	Independent	Lilian Henschke	2018	

=== Council Chairmen/Mayors of Burnside ===
Council Chairmen/Mayors since 1856 have been as follows:
Prior to 1935, the head of the Elected Members was the Chairman of the District Council.

Years	Chairmen
1856-1857	C R Penfold
1857-1858	A Fergusson
1858-1863	D Ferguson
1863-1869	G R Debney
1869-1871	G Soward
1872-1874	H Hughes
1874-1879	E Birkin
1879-1881	M Goldsack
1881-1883	G F Cleland
1883-1885	E Markey
1885-1894	G F Cleland
1894-1913	J R Osborn
1913-1918	P Wood
1920-1935	J A Harper

Years	Mayor
1935-1936	J A Harper
1936-1938	A W F Webb
1938-1940	W C N Waite
1940-1943	F L Parsons
1943-1946	P R Claridge
1946-1948	T R Mellor
1948-1950	A R Burnell
1950-1952	W H Holmes
1952-1954	G J H Bolton
1954-1956	J H Parkinson
1956-1959	P R Claridge
1959-1962	T A Philps
1962-1967	G J H Bolton
1967-1969	W W Langman
1969-1973	W H W Roney
1973-1975	M G R Perry
1975-1979	M E Bond
1979-1982	C J Soward
1982-1987	D J Batt
1987-1989	J C Wickham
1989-1991	J G Schaeffer
1991-1993	H V Shearn
1993-1995	J W Jacobsen
1995-2000	A J Taylor
2000-2010	W S Greiner
2010-2018	D T Parkin
2018-current	D A Monceaux

== Governance ==
=== Politics ===
For State Government Burnside is part of the Electoral Districts of Adelaide, Bragg, Morialta, Hartley, Heysen, Norwood and Unley. Bragg takes in most of the city; it is the strongest Liberal Party district in the Adelaide Metropolitan Area and the third strongest in the state. Liberal strength is strongest in the wealthy hills suburbs to the south-east around Beaumont and weakest around Norwood in the north where the Labor Party dominates. Before their catastrophic collapse in recent years, the Democrats polled impressive results in the western near-city suburbs. The Greens gained much of the previous Democrats vote in recent elections. Bragg has been held by Jack Batty of the Liberal Party, since the 2022 by-election following Vickie Chapman's resignation.

Burnside forms the southern part of the Federal Division of Sturt, which takes in much of Adelaide's eastern suburbs, stretching from Paradise to Glen Osmond. Up until the 2007 federal election, it was a safe Liberal seat for over thirty years. At the election, on a two-party preferred basis, the Liberal Party gained 50.94% of the vote and the Labor Party 49.06%, a difference of only 1,712 votes. Christopher Pyne held the seat for the Liberal Party from 1993 to 2019 when he retired. He was followed by James Stevens who was elected in the 2019 Australian federal election. Stevens previously served as the chief of staff to Steven Marshall, the premier of South Australia, and prior to that as the general manager of Michell Australia.

An inquiry was launched in 2009 by the then state Local Government Minister Gail Gago into allegations of "harassment, bullying and misconduct" by then members of the City Council. After about $200,000 of expenditure by the council and $1.3 million by the state government, legal action by former councilors prevented the release of the report. A Supreme Court ruling on 27 May 2011, found that the report could be partially released, after material related to parts of the terms of reference deemed inappropriate was redacted.

== Council facilities ==
=== Library ===
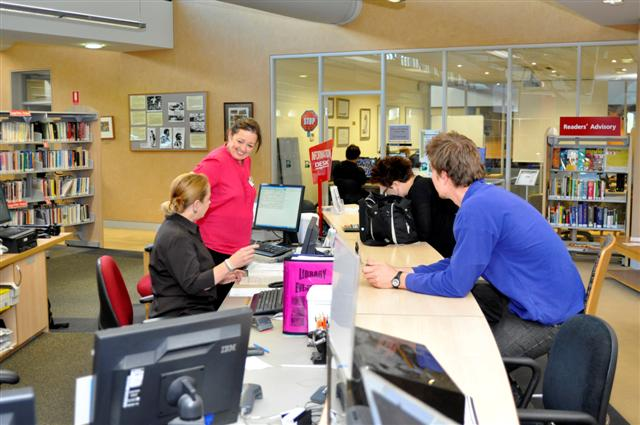
Burnside Library

Burnside Library, established in 1961, is the only public library in the city of Burnside. The present library building was built in 2000, and is situated adjacent to the Council offices and is part of the civic centre at 401 Greenhill Road, Tusmore. As of 2022 the library is open seven days a week, from 9.30am-6pm on weekdays, except Thursday when it closes at 9pm, and on the weekend from 10am-4pm on Saturday and 2pm-5pm on Sunday.

=== Town Hall ===
The Burnside Town Hall, designed by prolific South Australian architect Charles Rutt (father of Bevan Rutt; died 17 February 1932). It was built in 1927, was identified as one of South Australia's 120 most significant 20th-century buildings by the Australian Institute of Architects. There is a large hall providing 260 m^{2} (2,800 sq ft) of floor space, with wooden floors, decorative windows, and a high ceiling. The building underwent modifications after Burnside Ballroom was built, and it became used for storage, office space, and as a rehearsal room for the Burnside Symphony Orchestra and Burnside Youth Concert Band. In 2019 it was fully refurbished, with ongoing work in the following two years to upgrade adjacent amenities. Situated right on the corner of Greenhill and Portrush Roads, its entrance is from the Portrush side.

=== Ballroom ===
Burnside Ballroom, adjacent to the civic centre, is also an architecturally significant building, built in 1954 by Greg Bruer and Jack Bruer, of Evans, Bruer, & Hall, who were also responsible for the Piccadilly Cinema in North Adelaide as well as several other notable buildings in Adelaide. It is heritage-listed on the South Australian Heritage Register, described as "an excellent example of a 1950s interior demonstrating characteristics of a modernist design", and it is noted that "There are no other known examples of this style of civic interior intact". It has a large ground floor as well as a mezzanine, totalling 500 m (1,600 ft) of floor space. It also has an entrance foyer, ladies' powder rooms and gentlemen's cloak rooms, bars, and a kitchen. It is available for hire.

The Burnside Symphony Orchestra is based in the council area, and performs up to four concerts annually in the Burnside Ballroom.

== Demographics ==
Graph displaying the birthplaces of the quarter of the population born abroad

The population of the City of Burnside, at the time of the 2001 census, was 40,398. This was an increase of 1,308 from the 1996 census. 53.3% of the population is female and 73.6% were born in Australia. Burnside is characterised by what is called an 'urban mix' by demographers; it contains a diverse range of age, family and household types. There are 16,835 households in Burnside, 10,917 of these are self-described families. 45% of families represent a couple with children, 11.% represent a sole-parent family and 43.1% are couples without children (or whose children have left home). The large number of couples without children (5.6% higher than the Adelaide average) owes to the sizeable elderly population. Almost a quarter (23.7%) of the population is aged 60 or over, almost a third (29.9%) is 24 or younger; mature adults are the largest population group at 46.4%. This would indicate a structure primarily of mature families and retirees, young adults are hugely unrepresented (although this is not unique to Burnside, this phenomenon is common throughout the majority of the Adelaide region); the 18-24 age group suffered a loss of 330 people between 1996 and 2001.

26.3% of the population was born abroad, less than the Adelaide average. 9% of the population came from English-speaking countries, while 14.3% did not. In decreasing order, the foreign-born population was from the United Kingdom, Italy, Malaysia, New Zealand, Germany, Greece, Hong Kong, India, China and South Africa. These patterns are broadly in-line with that of Australia as a whole; they reflect traditional immigration from Commonwealth countries such as the United Kingdom and New Zealand, later waves of Mediterranean migrants and more recent arrivals from Asia.

Religious adherence in Burnside is higher than the Adelaide and Australian average, standing at 71.7%. Of this adherence, 67.6% represents traditional Christian denominations. Common across Australia and many developed countries, there has been a substantial decline in religiosity; this is evident but less marked in Burnside; 17.7% of residents profess no religious belief (atheism, agnosticism, etc.). The ten strongest religions/denominations in decreasing order are: Catholic, Anglican, Uniting, Orthodox, Lutheran, Baptist, Buddhism, Presbyterian, Judaism and Hinduism. Catholicism is unique for its marked increase (575 persons) in believers between 1996 and 2001, most other religions' numbers remained stable or saw a slight decrease.

== Economy ==
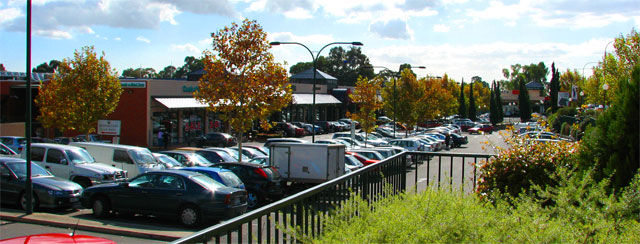
The Burnside Village shopping centre in autumn

Burnside has no manufacturing industries and a small number of agricultural plots still exist in the form of vineyards. It does however contain a sizeable amount of service industry; high-technology and commercial offices line the streets opposite the Adelaide park lands.

Burnside workers are employed in the Industries of Education, Health and Community Services (27%); Finance, insurance and business services (22.5%); wholesale and retail trade (16%); recreation and personal services (11.2%) and manufacturing (7.7%). In these industries they are employed as: Professionals (35.5%); clerks, salespersons and service (26.2%); Associate Professionals (13.7%); Managers and Administrators (12.4%) and tradespersons (4.8%).

== Education ==
Burnside has two public high schools, Glenunga International High School and Norwood International High School, in its boundaries. Glenunga High remains at capacity through student enrolment from overseas and outside the local area. Its beginnings can be traced back to 1898; it was first established as the South Australian School of Mines and Industries on North Terrace, its original buildings there are now part of the University of Adelaide campus. It changed name to Adelaide Technical High School in 1918. With the move to its current location at Glenunga in 1963 the name was eventually changed to Glenunga High School a decade later. The school attained International Baccalaureate accreditation in 1990 and 'International' was added to its title. Marryatville High School is also on the boundaries of Burnside and draws most of its students from Burnside. There are also Burnside Primary School and Linden Park Primary School, both years Rec-7 public schools.

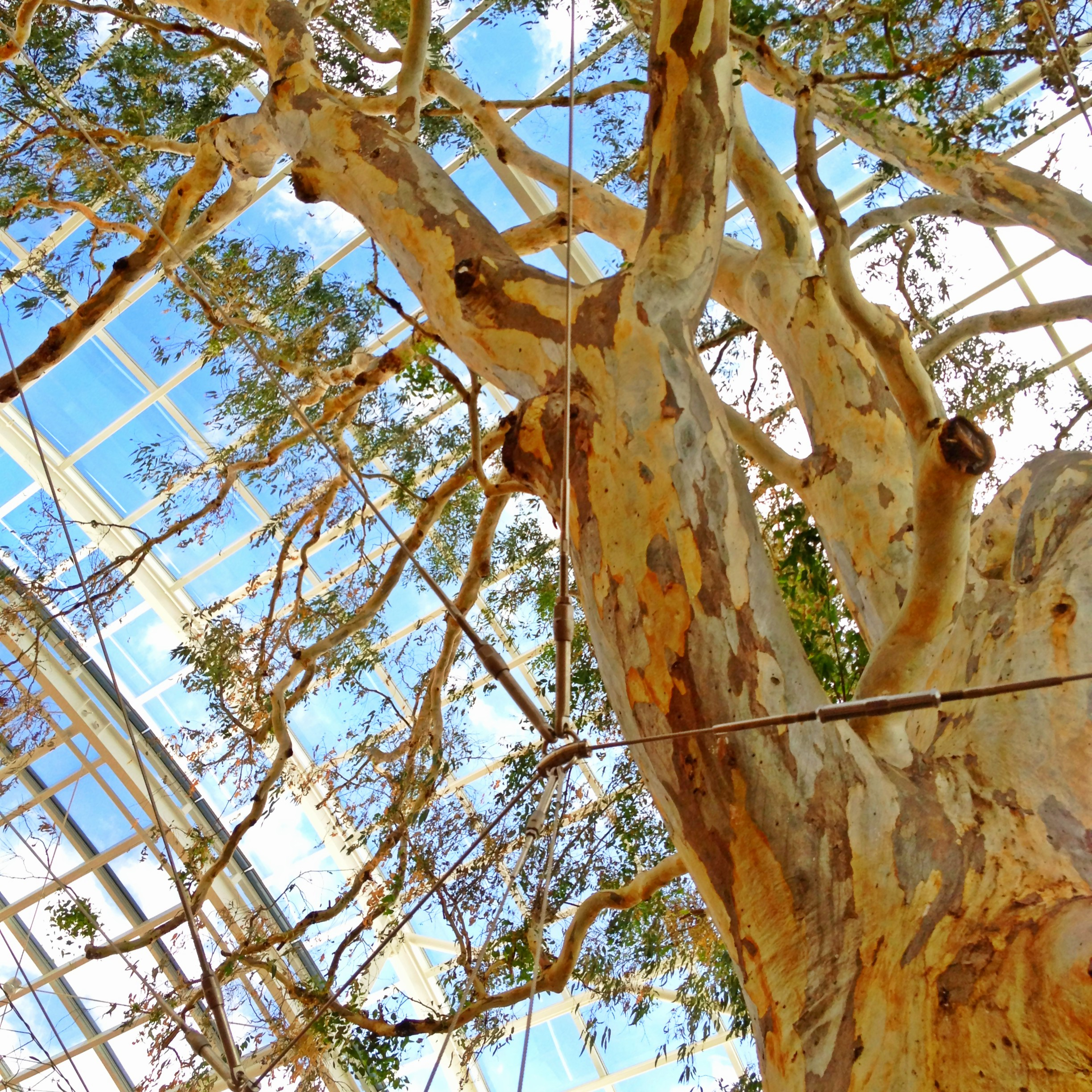
A eucalyptus tree inside the Burnside Village Shopping Centre, which was removed in 2013 due to ill health

== Infrastructure ==
=== Health ===
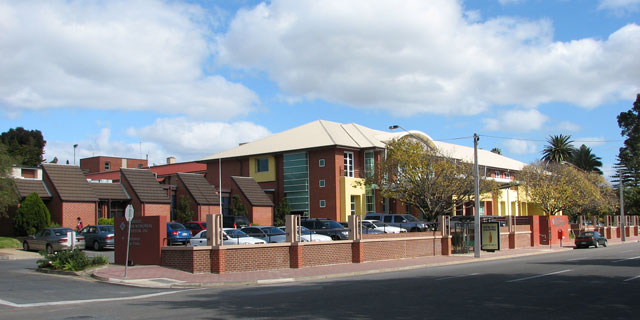
The Burnside War Memorial Hospital from Kensington Road

The Burnside War Memorial Hospital is the only community hospital in Burnside. Otto Georg Ludwig van Rieben offered his Attunga property for use as a community hospital free of charge in 1944. The council had first suggested building a community hospital in August 1943 as part of its Post-War Reconstruction and Development Committee; it was to cost no more than 100,000 pounds and be a memorial to honour Burnside's war dead. In April 1949 the first conversion of van Rieben's home was complete and the hospital was caring for 21 patients. The hospital closed for a month in 1956 and when it reopened was given its present name: The Burnside War Memorial Hospital. The hospital is not-for-profit and reinvests all surplus into upgrading facilities, equipment and services.

The Queen Victoria Hospital on the corner of Fullarton Road and Grant Avenue in Rose Park opened in 1902 with a grant of 2,550 pounds. It was originally known as "The Queen's Home" as it opened on the birth day of Queen Victoria, (24 May). It was renamed in 1939 to the "Queen Victoria Maternity Hospital" and under the Hospital Benefits Act of 1946 became a public hospital. It operated until 1995 when it was amalgamated with the Women's and Children's Hospital and the original building was sold and converted into apartments. Over 250,000 South Australians began their lives at the hospital.

=== Transport ===
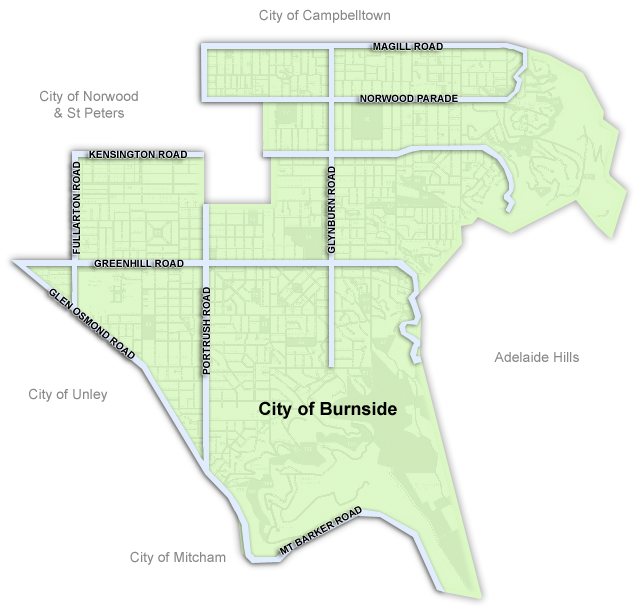
The Burnside Road Network

The area was originally served by horse-drawn buses and trolleys but it was electric trams and trolley buses that led to the development of Burnside as a suburban residential area.

Burnside is located at a transport crossroads for national freight movements. Freight traffic from Victoria diverges down Glen Osmond and Portrush Roads upon entering the metropolitan area via the South Eastern Freeway (formerly Mount Barker Road). Both roads carry an almost equal amount of freight traffic, Glen Osmond leads to Adelaide Airport and Outer Harbor while Portrush Road connects to the northern industrial suburbs, the state's north, Western Australia and the Northern Territory. In addition, they act as major commuter arteries for the Adelaide Hills and form the eastern part of Adelaide's outer bypass route. The current South Eastern Freeway was completed in 1999 and Portrush Road saw an extensive upgrade throughout 2003–2004.

Other major commuter roads include Kensington, Magill and Greenhill Roads, which run east–west. Glynburn and Fullarton Roads provide secondary north–south corridors, the former runs close to the foothills and alleviates congestion on Portrush while the latter forms part of Adelaide's inner bypass route. Maintenance of the extensive road network is a State Government responsibility; the federal government provides funding for nationally important AusLink routes. Council provides recommendations to projects and participates in the upkeep of the curbs, frontage, footpaths and minor signage.

Burnside residents rely overwhelmingly on cars as a means to travel to work; 64.3% drive their own vehicle and 5.6% are a regular passenger in one. 5.8% use public transport, in the form of Adelaide Metro buses, for their commute; 1.2% bicycle and 2.3% walk. Non-vehicular travel is on the rise, with usage higher than the Adelaide average and an increase in persons doing so between 1996 and 2001. 38% of Burnside households own one vehicle, 26.8% own two and 12.3% own three vehicles or more. Burnside and suburbs east of the city were served by an excellent tramway system that was shut down in the 1950s.

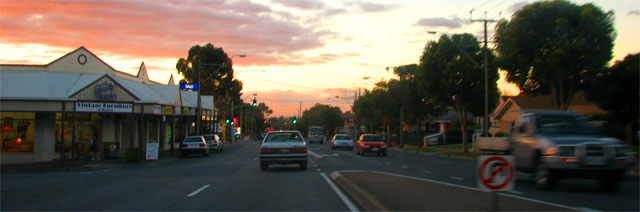
Portrush Road

With the advent of widespread automobile travel in the mid-20th century there was a tendency for motorists to use local roads in suburbs adjacent to the CBD for their commute home. 'Rat trails' of cars sneaked through narrow side-streets, presenting traffic bottlenecks. This was a particular problem for some western Burnside suburbs because of their location. Various traffic control methods were put in place (closing streets, speed bumps, lowered speed limits, roundabouts) to counter these problems; this forced the re-routing of traffic onto major thoroughfares.

=== Utilities ===
Burnside is connected to the Adelaide water, power and gas mains. Until recently, many of the foothills suburbs did not have access to sewage systems and used septic tanks. This had been rectified in the last decade in a partnership between SA Water and the Burnside Council.

SA Power Networks is the Electricity Distributor, with approximately 10 retailers. Burnside derives its electricity via the Adelaide grid from a gas-fired plant at Torrens Island. Burnside's water supply is gained from the Adelaide area reservoirs: Mount Bold, Happy Valley, Myponga, Millbrook, Hope Valley, Little Para and South Para. Further water demands result in the pumping of water from the River Murray. The provider of water services is by the government-owned SA Water. In early times, Burnside's creeks contributed to Adelaide's water supply. With enlarged market gardens upstream in the Adelaide Hills the water level and quality dropped and this was no longer feasible.

Council maintenance services are located at the Council Depot on Glynburn Road in the suburb of Burnside.
