= Fullarton, South Australia =

Fullarton
- Suburb
- Interactive map of Fullarton
- Coordinates: 34°57′04″S 138°37′44″E
- Country: Australia
- State: South Australia
- City: Adelaide
- LGA: City of Unley
- Location: 3 km (1.9 mi) from Adelaide
- Established: 1849

Government
  - State electorate: Unley
  - Federal divisions: Adelaide; Sturt

Population
  - Total: 4,500 (SAL 2021)
- Postcode: 5063
Suburbs around Fullarton
Unley	Parkside, Eastwood	Frewville
Malvern	Fullarton	Glenunga
Highgate	Myrtle Bank	Glen Osmond

Fullarton is an inner southern suburb of Adelaide, South Australia in the City of Unley. It population was recorded as 4,500 in 2021.

It adjoins Parkside, Unley, Malvern, Highgate and Myrtle Bank and is bisected by Fullarton Road. Fullarton is bounded by Cremorne Street, Randolph Avenue and Fullarton Road in the north, Glen Osmond Road in the east, Fisher Street, Fullarton Road and Cheltenham Street in the south and Balmoral Street, Fisher Street and Windsor Street in the west.

== History ==
Before British colonisation of South Australia and subsequent European settlement, Fullarton was inhabited by one of the groups who later collectively became known as the Kaurna peoples.

The suburb was first developed by James Frew, a Scottish settler from Glasgow who arrived with his family on the Lady Bute in 1839 and bought property from William Giles. Frew laid out the area in 1849, and named it after his wife, formerly Jane Fullarton. The family resided at an estate built between 1846 and 1850 called Malwood on what is now known as 11 and 13 Frew Street. Other significant historic properties dating from the 19th century include Woodfield at 78 Fisher Street and Penrose at 115 Wattle Street.

The suburb was officially established in 1849.

In 1912 the Girls' Probationary School, originally established at Woodville before being moved to "Sea View House" at Beaumont (1905), then for two years at Norwood (1910), moved to 39 Florence Street, Fullarton. Run by the Salvation Army for the state government (via the Children's Welfare and Public Relief Board, which succeeded the State Children's Council), it housed girls who were wards of the state classed as having behavioural problems – usually owing to truancy. It was intended as an intermediate home for children who had not been committed to a reformatory, but considered to require greater discipline than that offered at Edwardstown Industrial School. The building had 21 rooms housing 50 girls and six staff members, and in 1916 the old coach house was repurposed into two classrooms. It was also known as "The Haven", and housed a number of Aboriginal girls, some of whom undertook three years of training in "domestic arts". From 1945 until around 1969, it was named the Salvation Army Girls' Home, after being renamed when the Children's Welfare and Public Relief Board ceased control of the school, and it was no longer gazetted as a government-approved private institution. The government again assumed supervision of the home in 1950, under amendments to the Maintenance Act 1926-37, which mandated regular inspections for all institutions accommodating children under seven. In 1969 the home started admitting young boys, and was given the name Fullarton Children's Home. Today (2026), the building houses the Salvation Army SA and NT Divisional Office, along with various services offered by them.

== Governance and demographics ==
The local council for Fullarton is the City of Unley. It lies within the state government electoral district of Unley, and is covered by two federal divisions: Adelaide and Sturt.

The population of the suburb was recorded as 4,500 in the 2021 Australian Census, 54.1% of whom were female. 44.6% were tertiary educated, and 67.8% were born in Australia.

== Architecture and facilities ==
Fullarton has a mix of housing styles with leafy, tree-lined streets dotted with character homes – from Victorian Villas through Edwardian, Art Deco and Californian bungalows – alongside many modern rebuilds and subdivisions. Detached houses make up about 45 per cent of the housing stock with 45 per cent being semi-detached and units. Fullarton also houses a number of aged care facilities including the former Julia Farr Centre. This 2.8-hectare (6.9-acre) site has been redeveloped.

=== Parks ===
Fullarton Park hosts the monthly Fullarton Market for plants, produce, food, and bric-a-brac, and also houses the Fullarton Community Centre.

Katherine Street Reserve playground offers varied play areas, including a sandpit.

Fern Avenue Reserve has playground facilities, while next door is the Fern Avenue Community Garden.

=== Schools ===
Fullarton sits within the Unley Primary School and Glen Osmond Primary School and Glenunga International High School zones.

== Notable people ==
- Bronte Cockburn (born 1941), Australian basketball representative
- Constance Margaret Eardley (1910–1978), botanist and curator
- Joseph Fisher (1834-1907), Politician and newspaper proprietor
- James Frew (1804–1878), early Adelaide pioneer and founder of Fullarton and Frewville
- Andy Thomas (born 1951), first Australian astronaut in space
- Hugh Wallis (1910–1994), founder of Wallis Cinemas
- Mary Jane Warnes (1877–1959), women's activist
