= Glen Osmond, South Australia =

Glen Osmond
- Suburb
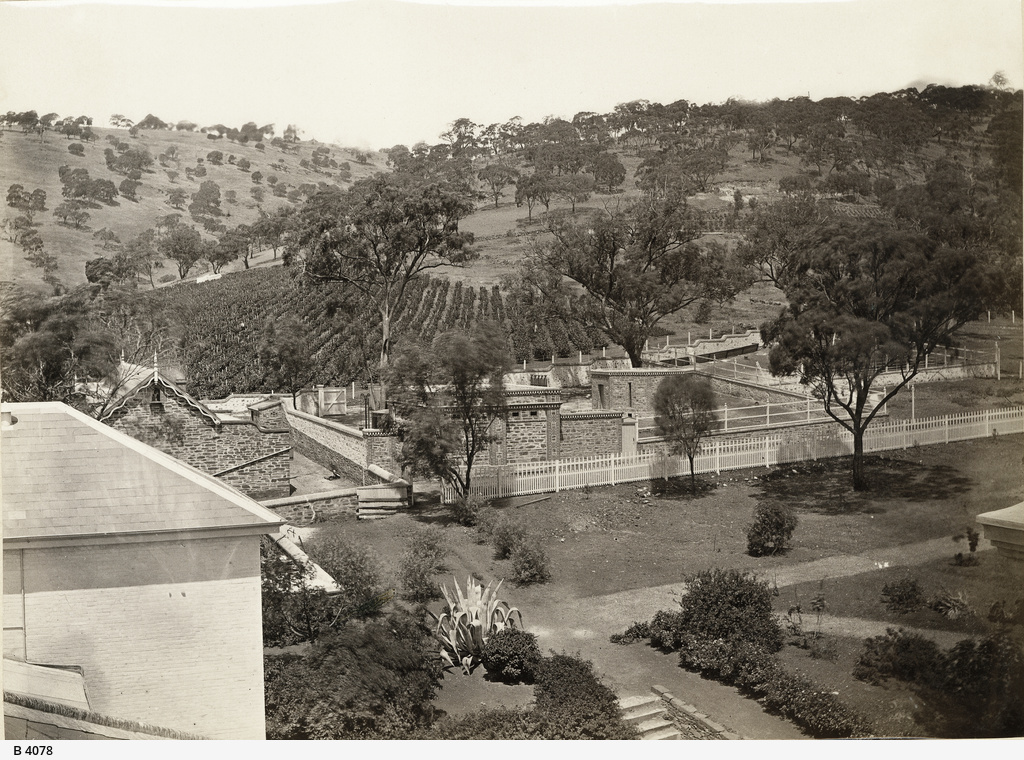
- Glen Osmond around 1869.

- Country: Australia
- State: South Australia
- City: Adelaide
- LGA: City of Burnside

Government
  - State electorates: Bragg; Unley
  - Federal division: Sturt

Area
  - Total: 1.2 km^{2} (0.46 sq mi)

Population
  - Total: 2,154 (SAL 2021)
- Postcode: 5064
Suburbs around Glen Osmond
Glenunga	St. Georges	Beaumont
Myrtle Bank	Glen Osmond	Mount Osmond
Urrbrae	Urrbrae	Mount Osmond

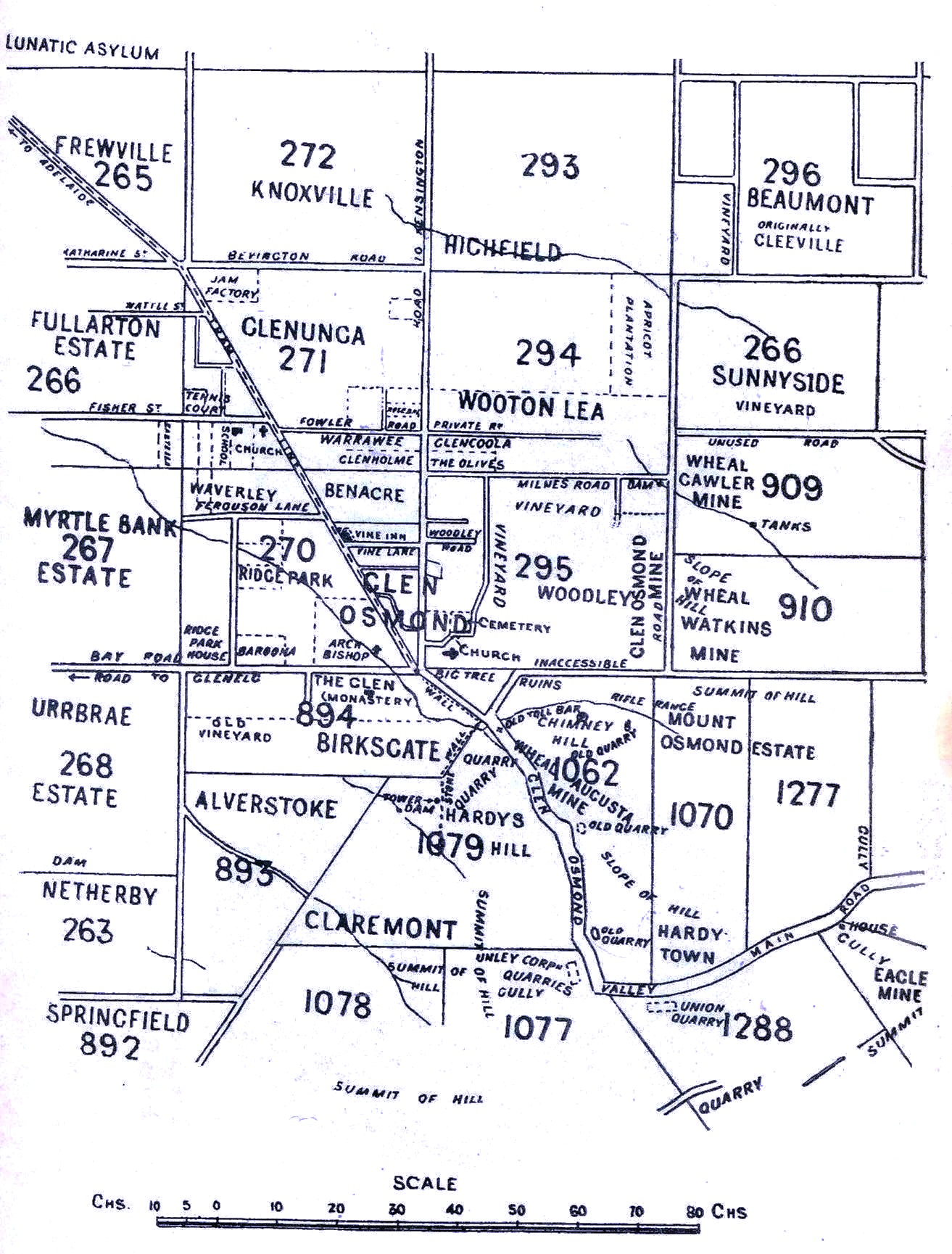
Glen Osmond c. 1900

Glen Osmond is a suburb of Adelaide, South Australia in the City of Burnside which is in the foothills of the Adelaide Hills. It is well known for the road intersection on the western side of the suburb, where the South Eastern Freeway (National Route M1) from the Adelaide Hills and the main route from Melbourne splits into National Route A17 Portrush Road (north, the main route towards Port Adelaide), Glen Osmond Road (running northwest towards Adelaide city centre) and state route A3 Cross Road west towards the coast and southern suburbs.

== History ==
In 1841, silver and lead were found at Glen Osmond, leading to the establishment of the Wheal Gawler and Wheal Watkins mines. The mines operated in the 1840s, and again in the 1890s.

== The Big Tree ==
A significant feature of the four-way intersection at Glen Osmond (Glen Osmond Road, Cross Road, Mount Barker Road (later South Eastern Freeway), and Portrush Road) was a eucalypt (Note: Gill names the species in the area as Eucalyptus odorata and Eucalyptus rostrata (since split into Eucalyptus robusta and Eucalyptus camaldulensis), the last of which is the more likely species.) known as "The Big Tree", whose associations with the history of Adelaide were "greater than any other", since surveyors pegged the boundaries of Section 270 in the year 1837. At one time the Mitcham Council had designs on the tree, which impeded the flow of traffic to Glenelg, but it was saved from the woodman's axe by Arthur Hardy of Birksgate. Tom Gill, in his history of the district, predicted it would be named "Hardy's Tree" in recognition of his philanthropy.

== Notable people ==
- Cedric Stanton Hicks, founder of the Australian Army Catering Corps, died here in 1976
- Nancy Cato (1917–2000), writer and activist, born and raised in Glen Osmond.

== Bibliography ==
Tom Gill, whose family were early settlers in the area, published a History and Topography of Glen Osmond in 1905. A facsimile edition of the book was published by the State Library of South Australia in 1974.
