= Wayville, South Australia =

Wayville
- Suburb
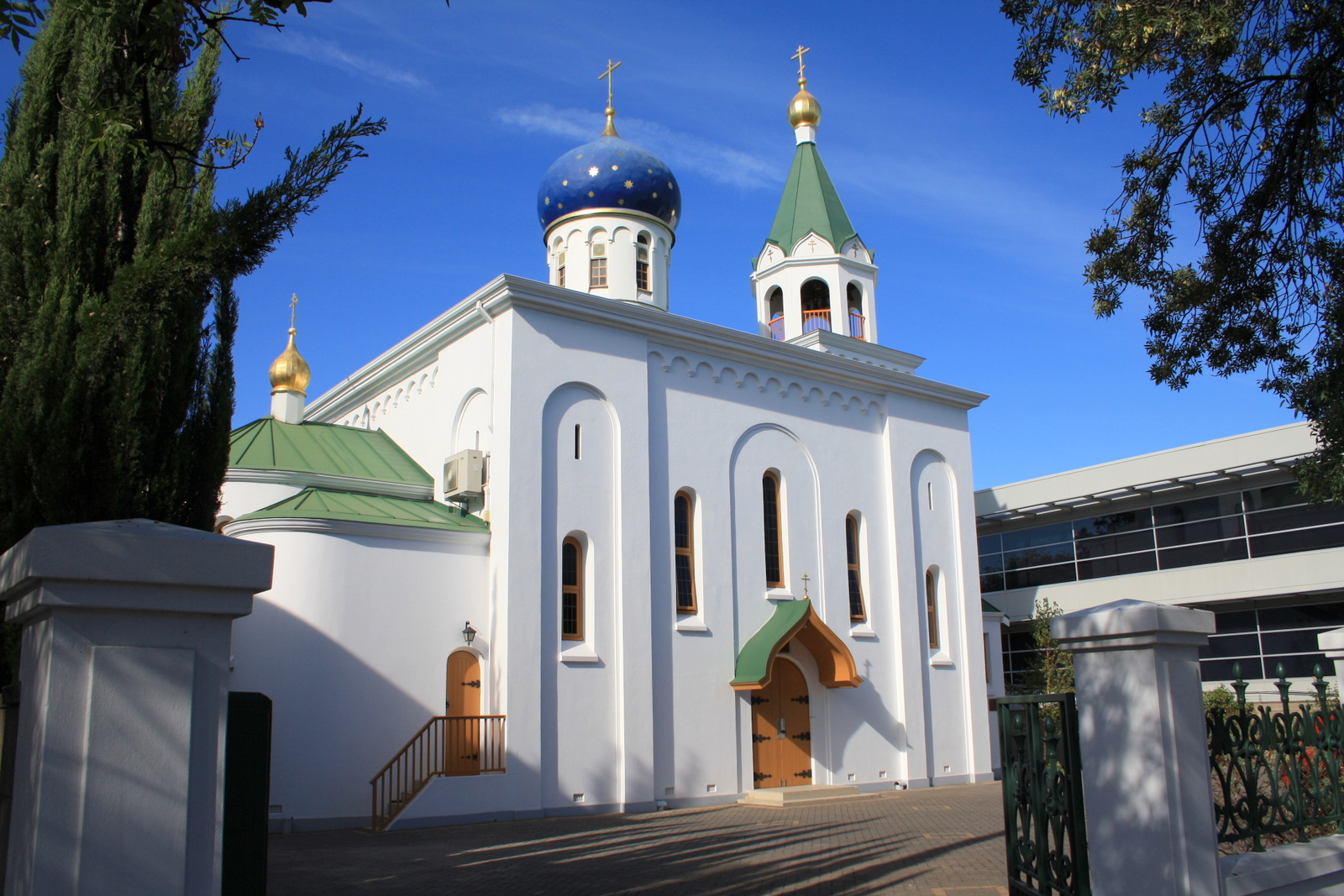
- St. Nicholas Russian Orthodox Church on Greenhill Road

- Interactive map of Wayville
- Coordinates: 34.945°S 138.591°E
- Country: Australia
- State: South Australia
- City: Adelaide
- LGA: City of Unley
- Established: 1899

Government
  - State electorate: Unley
  - Federal division: Adelaide

Population
  - Total: 1,922 (SAL 2021)
- Time zone: UTC+9:30 (ACST)
  - Summer (DST): UTC+10:30 (ACDT)
- Postcode: 5034
- Mean max temp: 22.1 °C (71.8 °F)
- Mean min temp: 12.1 °C (53.8 °F)
- Annual rainfall: 545.3 mm (21.47 in)
Suburbs around Wayville
Keswick Terminal	Adelaide Park Lands	Adelaide Park Lands
Keswick	Wayville	Unley
Forestville	Goodwood	Unley

Wayville is an inner-southern suburb of Adelaide in the City of Unley. It is most notable for hosting of the Royal Adelaide Show at the Adelaide Showgrounds.

The suburb is bordered to the north by Adelaide's South Parklands, to the west by Adelaide-Goodwood railway line, to the east by King William Road, and to the south by Leader Street, Parsons Street and Simpson Parade. Keswick Creek, a tributary of the Brown Hill Creek and Patawalonga River, flows through the southern side of the suburb.

== History ==
In the 1860s, the place where Wayville now stands was a milk run rented from the South Australian Company. In the 1870s, King William Street was extended south through the Park Lands and Unley; this continues to form the eastern boundary of the suburb.

Wayville was first subdivided in 1881, but it was named Goodwood at that time. In 1899 the area was named Wayville after Reverend James Way.

Wayville Post Office opened around 1909. Wayville Military Post Office was open from 16 July 1940 until 19 October 1946 while the Showgrounds were used as an army camp.

== Points of interest ==
The Latvian Hall or Talava (old mountain castle), located at 4 Clark Street in Wayville, was established in 1966. The hall is rented out to the community, and is supported by the Latvian Chamber of Commerce and Industry in Australia Inc. (LCCIA).

The Anglican Church of Emmanuel was located on the corner of Young and Clark Streets, and formed part of the Anglican Parish of Parkside, along with St. Oswald's Church in Parkside. The cornerstone was laid by His Excellency the Governor Sir Thomas Bridges on 28 April 1923. This church was closed in 2014, and the building is now occupied by the evangelical Healing Life Church.

The St Michael the Archangel Church is part of the Roman Catholic (Latin Rite) Society of St. Pius X. The church was first built in 1894, the cornerstone laid on 15 September 1894. The Church and hall were rebuilt in 1948. The new cornerstone was laid by Mrs Playford, the wife of then Premier Thomas Playford IV, on 20 November 1948.

There is a Ukrainian Catholic Church, Protection of Mother of God Parish, on Davenport Terrace. On the Church grounds is a memorial bearing the insignia of the 14th Waffen Grenadier Division of the SS (1st Galician) reading "In memory of soldiers who died for liberation of Ukraine". Next to this is a smaller memorial: "In memory of Michael Sukmanowsky Ukrainian boy scout killed in Vietnam". The St Peter's Latvian EV-Lutheran Memorial Church was erected in the memory of those who served in the World Wars. The Church is part of the Evangelical Lutheran Church of Latvia of Adelaide. The church was built in 1971.

The St. Nicholas Russian Orthodox Church is located on 41 Greenhill Road.

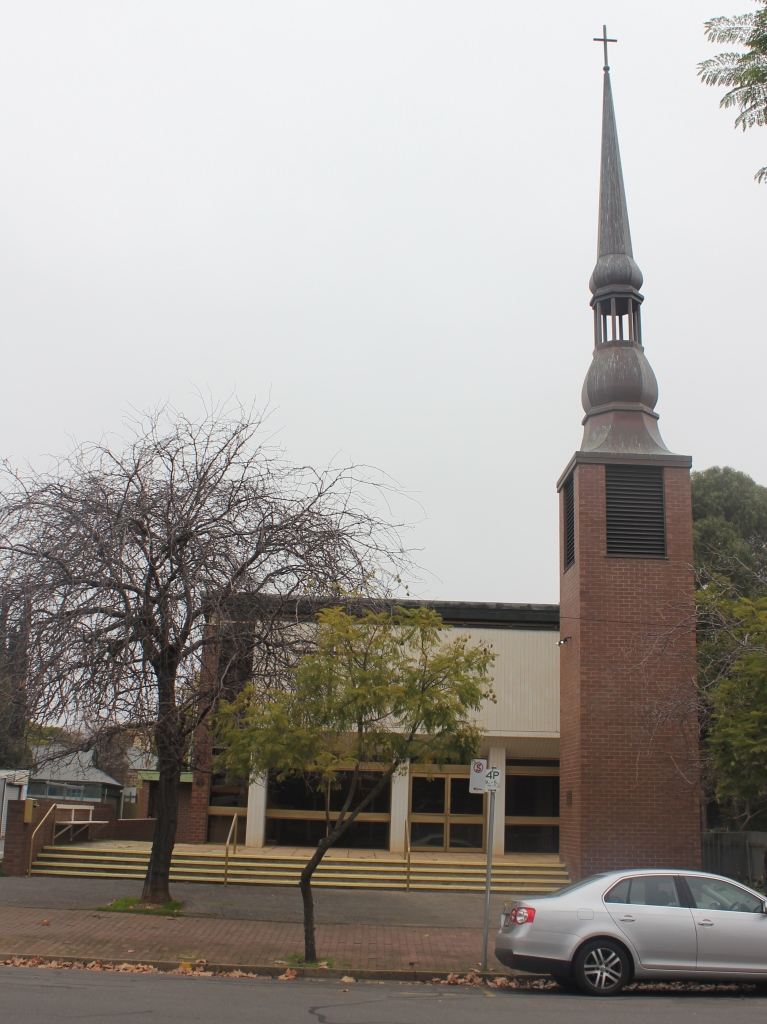
St. Peter's Latvian Evangelical Lutheran Church

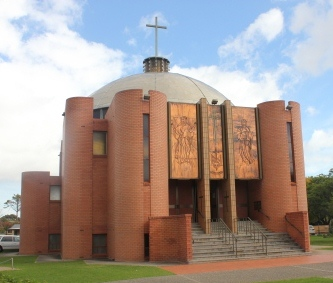
The Ukrainian Catholic Church

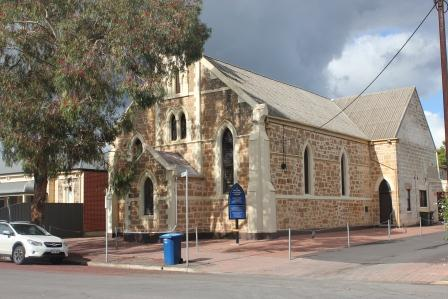
The St. Michael Roman Catholic Church

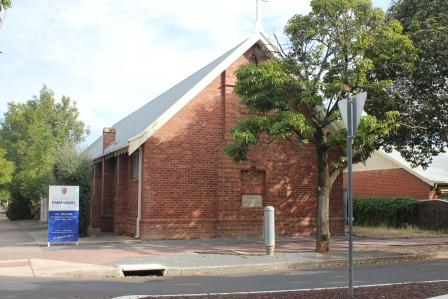
The Emmanuel Anglican Church

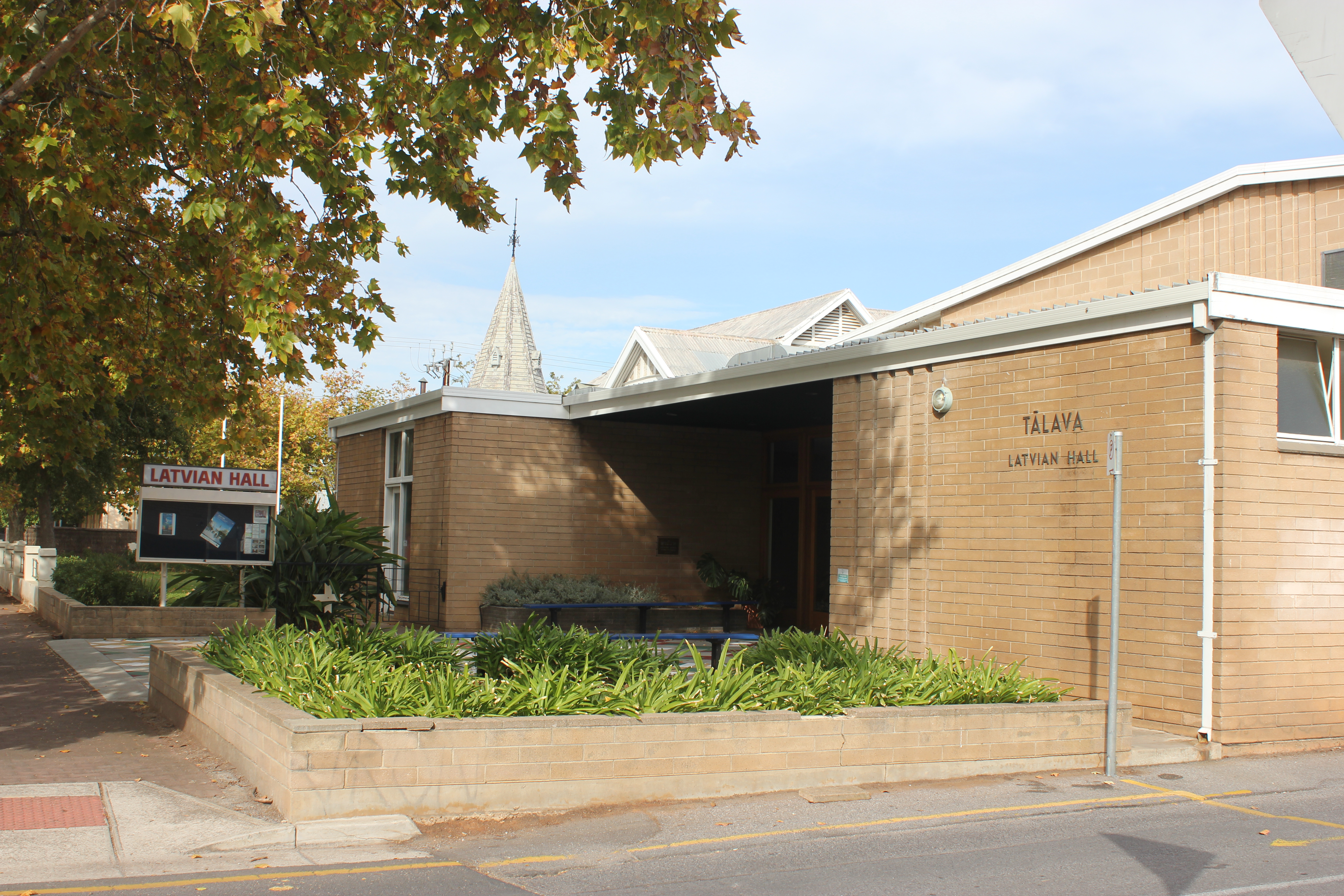
The Latvian Hall of South Australia

The Adelaide Showground Farmers Market is open every Sunday, 9am to 1pm. The purpose of the market is to sell food and food related products by farmers and producers of South Australia. Entrance to the market is from the Leader Street (south) side of the Adelaide Showground.

The "Amphi Cosma" house in Young Street was built in 1914 by the noted Adelaide master builder Walter C. Torode for his own use. The architecture is of particular interest because of its unique octagonal design and its reinforced concrete structure. A noteworthy feature was a central reinforced concrete pillar and a series of radiating beams.

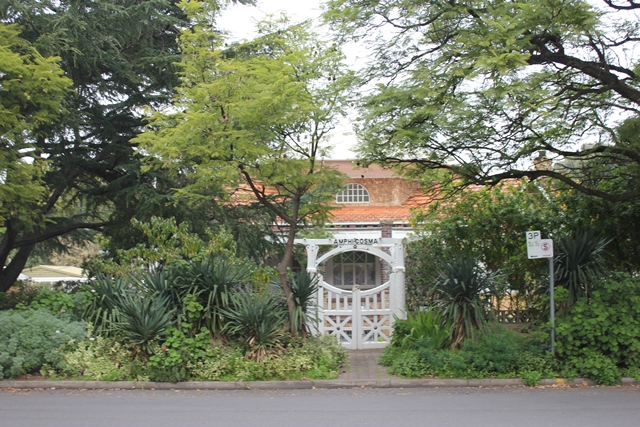
Amphi Cosma front

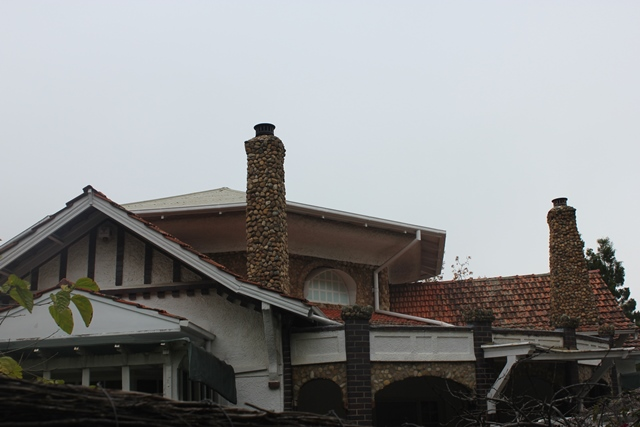
Amphi Cosma roof

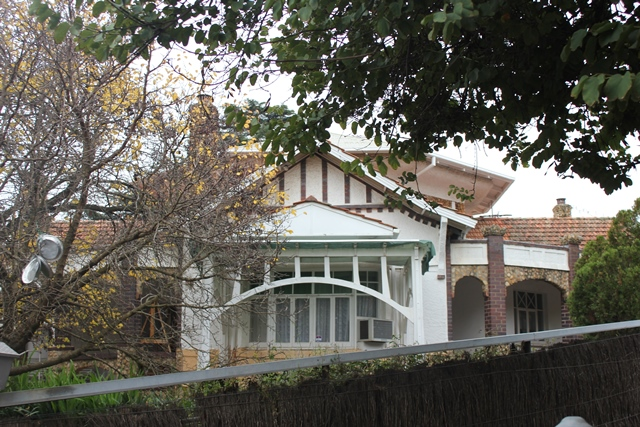
Amphi Cosma side

== Education ==
Annesley Junior School is located on Greenhill Road on the northern edge of the suburb. It is an independent day school for girls and boys aged from two years old to year 6. The school was established in 1902 as Methodist Ladies' College.

The Alliance Française d’Adelaide at 319 Young Street is an Australian not-for-profit association set up for the promotion of French language and culture. It offers a range of French language courses, sponsors a number of French culture events for music and sponsors the Alliance Française French Film Festival.

Fusion Business College is a provider of training to retail businesses. It is accredited by the Australian Government as a registered training organisation. Fusion Business Solutions was founded by Marc Brien and his wife Karen in July 1999.

Central Queensland University Appleton Institute is a multidisciplinary research hub located at 44 Greenhill Road. The institute was founded in 2012 and has a teaching program in Safety Science.

The SACE Board of South Australia is located at 60 Greenhill Road. It is an independent statutory authority established under the SACE Board of South Australia Act 1983, with responsibility for the accreditation, assessment, recognition and certification of learning in the South Australian Certificate of Education (the SACE).

== Transportation ==
There are two Glenelg tram line stops in Wayville: Greenhill Rd - Tram Stop 1 and Wayville - Tram Stop 2. Just west of Wayville in Goodwood there is a third tram stop, Goodwood Rd - Tram Stop 3.

Preceding station	Adelaide Metro	Following station
Greenhill Road towards Royal Adelaide Hospital, Adelaide Entertainment Centre or Festival Plaza	Glenelg tram line	Goodwood Road towards Moseley Square

There are numerous bus stops: three on Goodwood Road, stops 1, 2, and 3; five on Greenhill Road, stops 1B, 1C, 2, 2A, and 2B; and two on King William Road, stops 1 and 2.

On the northern side of the suburb, Greenhill Road is part of A21 the City Ring Route.

The numerous bike trails serving Wayville may be found at "BikeMap". Part of the Mike Turtur Bikeway runs along the edge of Wayville. Running from the Adelaide city centre to Glenelg, the Mike Turtur Bikeway is the busiest cycling commuter route connected to the city.

== Accommodation ==
Rosemary's Place at 7 Rose Terrace is designed to be country friendly accommodation. It consists of two fully furnished comfortable and inexpensive 1 bedroom maisonettes, and provides easy access to medical, government, and education services.

Rectory Cottage is a B&B located at 15 Rose Terrace. The cottage was built in 1900 as a pastor's residence. The cottage has two bedrooms and is self-contained.

Rose Terrace Lodge is located at 102 Rose Terrace. This is a Supported Residential Facility.

== Notable people ==
- Vickie Chapman, Australian politician lived in Wayville
- Sara Douglass, Australian fantasy writer went to school in Wayville
- Oswald Bertram Lower, Australian chemist and pharmacist known for his contributions to entomology lived in Wayville
- Sally Newmarch, Australian triple Olympic rower went to school in Wayville
- Scott McPhee, Australian cyclist lives in Wayville
- Joseph Albert Riley, South Australian businessman lived in Wayville
- Arthur Baker-Clack, Australian-born painter went to school in Wayville
- Alison Mary Dolling, (pen-name Mary Broughton) Australian writer went to school in Wayville
- David Penberthy, Editor-in-chief of News Limited news site news.com.au
- Kate Ellis, Former ALP federal member for Adelaide
- Walter C. Torode noted Adelaide master builder lived in Wayville

== Fauna ==
- Laughing kookaburra, Laughing kookaburra (Dacelo novaeguineae)
- Noisy miner, Noisy miner (Manorina melanocephala)
- Blue-tongued skink, Commonly called blue-tongued lizards
- Piping shrike, The piping shrike is the emblematic bird that appears on South Australia's flag, State Badge and Coat of Arms. (Gymnorhina tibicen leuconota)
- Superb fairywren, Superb fairywren (Malurus cyaneus)
- Redback spider, Redback spider (Latrodectus hasselti)
- Crimson rosella, Crimson rosella (Platycercus elegans)
- Willie wagtail, Willie wagtail (Rhipidura leucophrys)
- Magpie-lark, Magpie-lark (Grallina cyanoleuca), also known as wee magpie, peewee, peewit, mudlark or Murray magpie,
- Rainbow lorikeet, Rainbow lorikeet (Trichoglossus moluccanus)
- Sulphur-crested cockatoo, Sulphur-crested cockatoo (Cacatua galerita) I

== Flora ==
- Lemon-scented gum, Lemon-scented gum (Corymbia citriodora)
- Jacaranda, Jacaranda (Jacaranda mimosifolia)
