= City of Unley =

Coordinates: 34°57′S 138°36′E

- Local government area
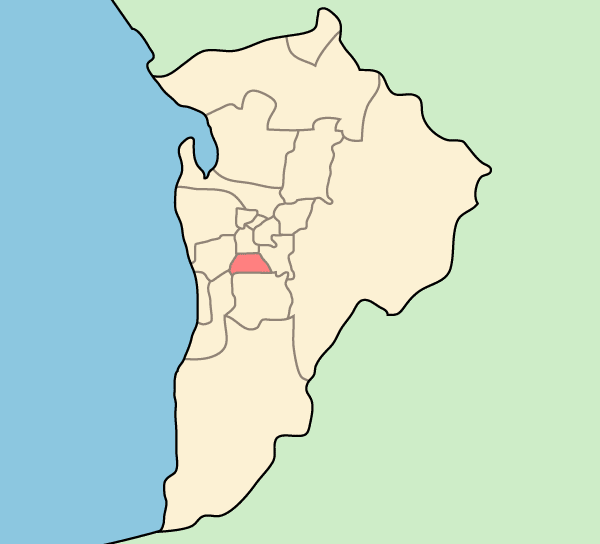

- Interactive map of City of Unley
- Country: Australia
- State: South Australia
- Region: Eastern Adelaide
- Established: 1871
- Council seat: Unley

Government
  - Mayor: Michael Hewitson
  - State electorate: Unley, Waite, Ashford
  - Federal division: Adelaide, Sturt

Area
  - Total: 14.29 km^{2} (5.52 sq mi)

Population
  - Total: 38,641 (LGA 2021)
  - Density: 2,826/km^{2} (7,320/sq mi)
- Website: City of Unley
LGAs around City of Unley
City of West Torrens	City of Adelaide	City of Burnside
City of West Torrens	City of Unley	City of Burnside
City of Marion	City of Mitcham	City of Mitcham

The City of Unley is a local government area in the Adelaide metropolitan region, South Australia. It is located directly south of the Adelaide city centre.

The Corporate Town of Unley was created in 1871, when 2,000 signatories to a petition from residents of the several towns of Unley, Parkside, Black Forest, Goodwood and Fullarton requested the Governor allow them to form their own municipality and thus sever from the District Council of Mitcham. The first town hall was built in 1880. It became the third municipality in the State to gain city status in 1906 (after the Cities of Adelaide and Port Adelaide), becoming the current City of Unley.

== History ==
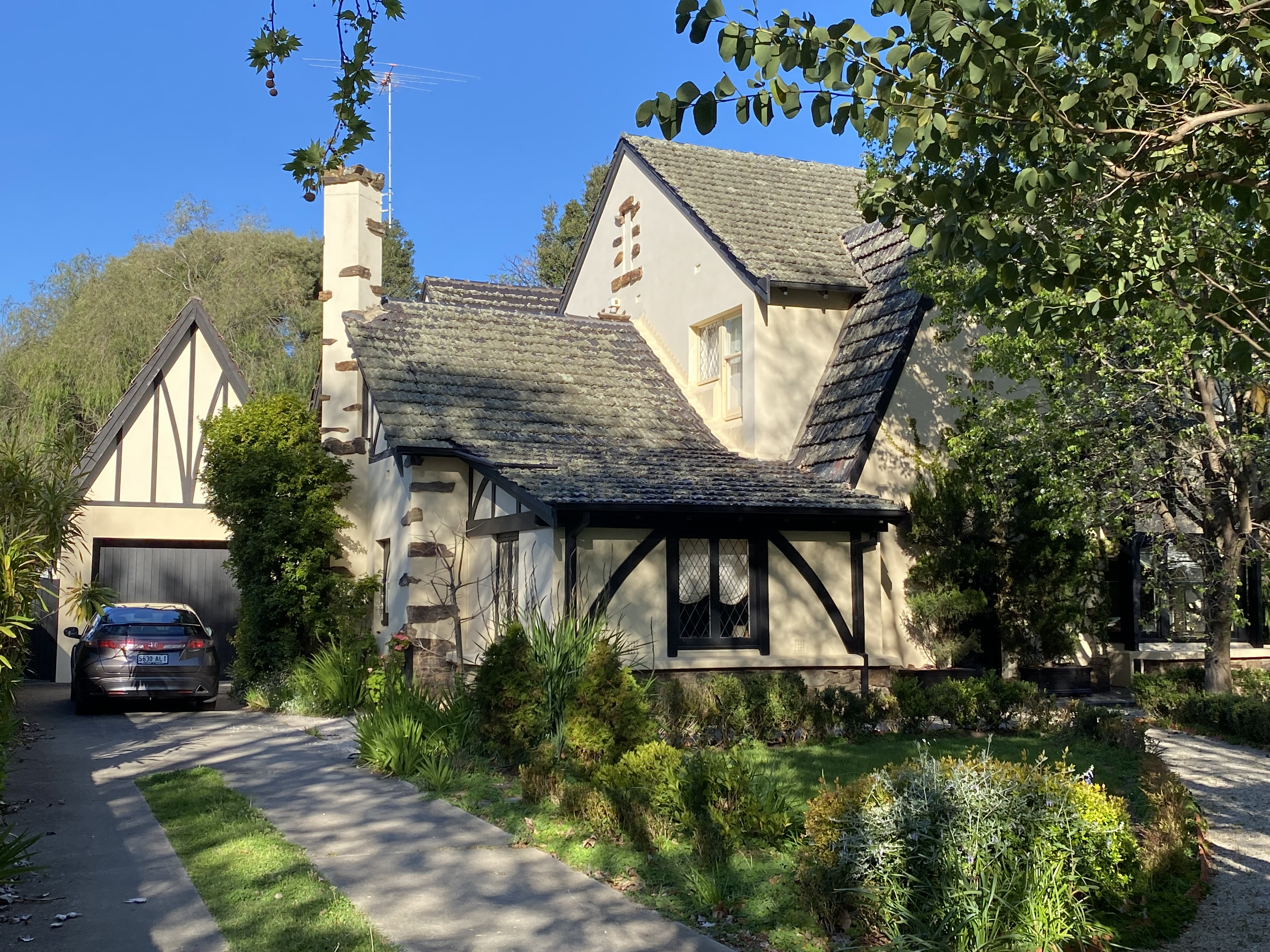
Tudor Revival house in Unley Park

Located on traditional lands of the Kaurna people, the City of Unley is rich in history, character and atmosphere, and centrally located only minutes from Adelaide's city centre.

In 2011, the mayor Lachlan Clyne was arrested by police for fraud and other things. However, all charges were thrown out of court in 2012. With the Police Ombudsman recommending that the police officer who led the failed investigation face internal disciplinary charges.

== Environment ==
Unley is one of three suburban Adelaide councils to be awarded a "Tree Cities of the World" designation from the Food and Agriculture Organization of the United Nations (FAO) and Arbor Day Foundation, along with the City of Burnside and the City of Mitcham, which as of July 2020 are the only three in Australia.

== Climate action ==
In 2020 the City of Unley joined the Global Covenant of Mayors for Climate and Energy and pledged to measure its GHG emissions, set emission targets, and develop a plan to support emission reductions.

However, the City of Unley hasn't declared a climate emergency, nor banned fossil fuel advertising on property it owns.

=== Council corporate emissions ===
The City of Unley's CO_{2} corporate emissions represent about 1% of total community-wide emissions. Its total corporate emissions for 2020 were estimated as 3,600 tonnes CO_{2} equiv, comprising 1,700 tonnes CO_{2} equiv Scope 1 and 2 emissions, and 1,900 tonnes CO_{2} equiv Scope 3 emissions.

To address its corporate emissions, the City of Unley developed a draft Climate and Energy Plan (CEP) that proposed attaining carbon neutrality by 2030. To achieve this goal the City of Unley's intends: staged adoption of electric vehicles; an electrification strategy to progressively switch from gas to electricity for space and water heating; more solar PV installations including at community centres; continued energy efficiency upgrades including LED lighting and building upgrades; and sustainable procurement improvements aimed at supporting local low-carbon industry suppliers. These measures will reduce Scope 1 and 2 emissions while procurement policies will work to reduce Scope 3 emissions. However, the CEP acknowledges that to become carbon neutral the City of Unley must eventually purchase carbon offsets for its Scope 3 emissions.

==== Carbon neutral date brought forward from 2030 to 2023 ====
In mid-2021 a local community group, Unley Voices for Climate Action (UVCA), made a detailed submission to Council, signed by more than 70 residents, arguing for a more ambitious plan including an earlier carbon-neutral date. In September 2021 Council approved its Climate and Energy Plan which included a carbon-neutral date brought forward from 2030 to 2023. Councillors who voted in favour of the December 2023 carbon neutral date anticipated buying high quality carbon offsets with co-benefits of indigenous employment and biodiversity.

==== Carbon neutral date setback from 2023 to 2030 ====
Following the South Australian local government elections in November, 2022, Michael Hewitson was re-elected as Mayor. Six new ward Councillors were elected, and six ward Councillors were returned. At the City of Unley Council meeting on 27 February 2023, a majority of Councillors voted in favour of the motion by new Liberal Party councillor, Jack Gaffey, to amend Council's Climate Change Policy. The amendment reverts the target carbon-neutral date of Council's corporate emissions from December, 2023 to December, 2030 by bringing forward carbon abatement measures specified in the CEP. Funds which were allocated to purchase accredited carbon offsets starting in December, 2023 will instead be spent on accelerating carbon abatement measures with the amount to be determined during the Annual Business Plan and Budget process. The outcome of the 27 February 2023 Council meeting shifts the purchase of carbon offsets from December, 2023 back to December, 2030.

=== Community-wide emissions ===
The remaining 99% of community-wide emissions originate from residents and businesses comprising: transport (45%), electricity (30%), gas (20%) and waste (5%). The City of Unley doesn't have a formal strategy or a target carbon-neutral date for community-wide emissions but it is encouraging the reduction of waste and transport emissions. It supports and encourages its residents to move food waste into organic bins for composting rather than landfill, and by providing more investment in cycleways and pedestrian friendly streetscapes.

==== 2022 community climate change focus group surveys ====
As part of its commitment to the Global Covenant of Mayors for Climate and Energy, the City of Unley will need to set a community-wide emissions reduction goal. In 2022, the City of Unley commissioned market research surveys using focus groups to better understand community views on climate change, barriers to community emissions reduction, and to gather ideas for how Council can support community emissions reduction.

To help guide future work to support reduction of community-wide emissions, the City of Unley wanted to understand the breadth of community's views on climate change. As such, focus groups were used to support hearing a spectrum of views, rather than just the strong community voices for or against climate change action.

==== Key feedback from focus groups ====
A total of 43 residents in 5 community focus groups across Council wards took part. The most common responses to the question: "How can the community reduce its emissions?" were:

• Retain green spaces and trees and plant more

• Drive less – ride walk, catch public transport, or use electric vehicles

• Use less energy at home

• Create less waste and recycle better

• Install household solar generation and storage

• Build sustainable houses

• Use consumer and citizen influence

• Change attitudes of those around you

The most common responses to the question: "What can Council do to help reduce community emissions?" were:

• Advocate for more renewable and affordable energy and vehicles

• Support community solar or bulk purchase schemes

• Provide additional waste management services

• Provide green streets and public spaces

• Provide safe and attractive walking and cycling routes

• Advocate to State government for better public transport

• Educate the community about how to reduce their environmental footprint

• Improve development outcomes through assessment and advocacy for policy reform

• Provide grants, incentives and rebates for greening and sustainability improvements

• Lead by example with technology adoption

== Council ==
The council, and the councillors' registered interests, as of December 2022 are:

Ward	Party	Councillor
Mayor	Independent	Michael Hewitson
Clarence Park	Independent	Don Palmer
Clarence Park	Independent	Rebekah Rogers
Fullarton	Independent	Peter Hughes
Fullarton	Liberal	Jack Gaffey
Goodwood	Greens	Georgie Hart
Goodwood	Independent	Chris Crabbe
Parkside	Liberal	Luke Doyle
Parkside	Greens	Jennifer Bonham
Unley	Independent	Jane Russo
Unley	Independent	Stephen Finos
Unley Park	Liberal	Monica Broniecki
Unley Park	Independent	Michael Rabbitt

== Suburbs ==
- Black Forest - 5035
- Clarence Park - 5034
- Everard Park - 5035
- Forestville - 5035
- Fullarton - 5063
- Goodwood - 5034
- Highgate - 5063
- Hyde Park - 5061
- Kings Park - 5034
- Malvern - 5061
- Millswood - 5034
- Myrtle Bank - 5064
- Parkside - 5063
- Unley - 5061
- Unley Park - 5061
- Wayville - 5034

== Mayors ==
Sources:

- John Henry Barrow (1871–1872)
- L. Scammell (1872–1874)
- Henry Codd (1874–1877)
- J. H. Bagster (1877–1878)
- W. Townsend (1878–1881)
- James S. Greer (1881–1884)
- George Howell (1884–1886)
- W. A. Hubble (1886–1887)
- J. G. Jenkins (1887–1889)
- William Shierlaw (1889)
- W. A. Hubble (1889–1890)
- J. O'Connell (1890)
- James Viner Smith (1890–1891)
- John Herbert Cooke (1904–1907)
- Alfred Samuel Lewis (1907–1909)
- John Henry Chinner (1909–1912)
- Walter Dollman (1912–1914)
- Thomas Elliott Yelland (1914–1916)
- William Norman Parsons (1916–1918)
- William Harold Langham (1918–1920)
- Herbert Richards (1920–1922)
- Alfred Ernest Morris (1922–1924)
- Ethelbert Bendall (1924–1926)
- George Illingworth (1926–1928)
- Benjamin John Sellick (1928–1930)
- Charles Mayo Read (1930–1932)
- Frederick James Barrett (1933–1935)
- John McLeay Sr. (1935–1937)
- James McGregor Soutar (1937–1939)
- Colin Dunnage (1939–1941)
- Keith Bentzen (1941–1943)
- Henry Dunks (1943–1946)
- William Morris Harrell (1946–1948)
- Samuel Gild (1948–1949)
- Claude Stanislaus Coogan (1949–1952)
- Joseph Young (Joe) Woollacott (1952–1953)
- Theodore Fergus Ballantyne (1953–1955)
- Alfred G. M. Freeman (1953–1955)
- George S. Barlow (1957–1959)
- Claude F. Page (1959–1961)
- John McLeay Jr. (1961–1963)
- Leonard Iles (1963–1965)
- Alexander L. Hood (1965–1967)
- Lewis G. Short (1967–1970)
- Clement Colman (1970–1972)
- Eric H. Parish (1972–1974)
- Laurence K. Simon (1974–1975)
- Lloyd K. Lovell (1975–1977)
- John H. Southern (1977–1980)
- Cecil S. Rowe (1980–1982)
- Denis A. Sheridan (1982–1985)
- Barry L. Schuetz (1985–1987)
- David H. McLeod (1987–1991)
- Michael Keenan (1991–2006)
- Richard Thorne (2006–2010)
- Lachlan Clyne (2010–2018)
- Peter Hughes (acting, 2018–2018)
- Michael Hewitson (2018–present)

== See also ==
- Local Government Areas of South Australia
- List of Adelaide suburbs
- List of Adelaide parks and gardens
