= Linden Park, South Australia =

Linden Park
- Suburb
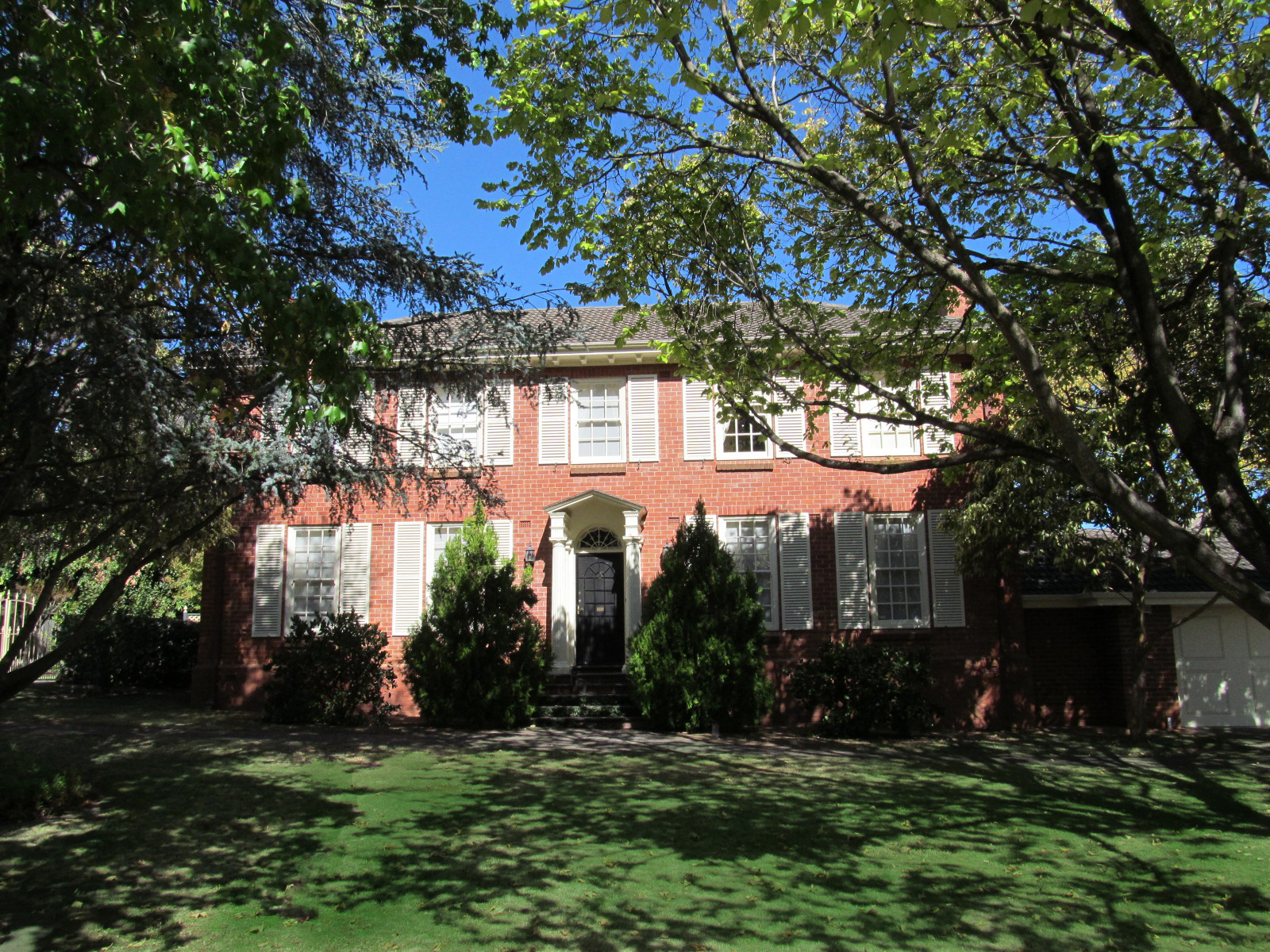
- Georgian-style home within the suburb

- Country: Australia
- State: South Australia
- City: Adelaide
- LGA: City of Burnside

Population
  - Total: 2,367 (SAL 2021)
- Postcode: 5065

Linden Park is a suburb of Adelaide, South Australia in the City of Burnside. It derives its name from the Linden tree.

Linden Park was created when an existing allotment was subdivided and sold for housing in 1882.

Many of its streets are named after British First Sea Lords and admiralty, including:

- Hood Street: Samuel Hood, 1st Viscount Hood
- Keyes Street: Roger Keyes, 1st Baron Keyes
- Sturdee Street: Doveton Sturdee
- Jellicoe Street: John Jellicoe, 1st Earl Jellicoe
- Beatty Street: David Beatty, 1st Earl Beatty
- Wemyss Street: Rosslyn Wemyss, 1st Baron Wester Wemyss
- Hay Road: Lord John Hay
