= Kensington Road, Adelaide =

Road in Adelaide, Australia

Kensington Road South Australia
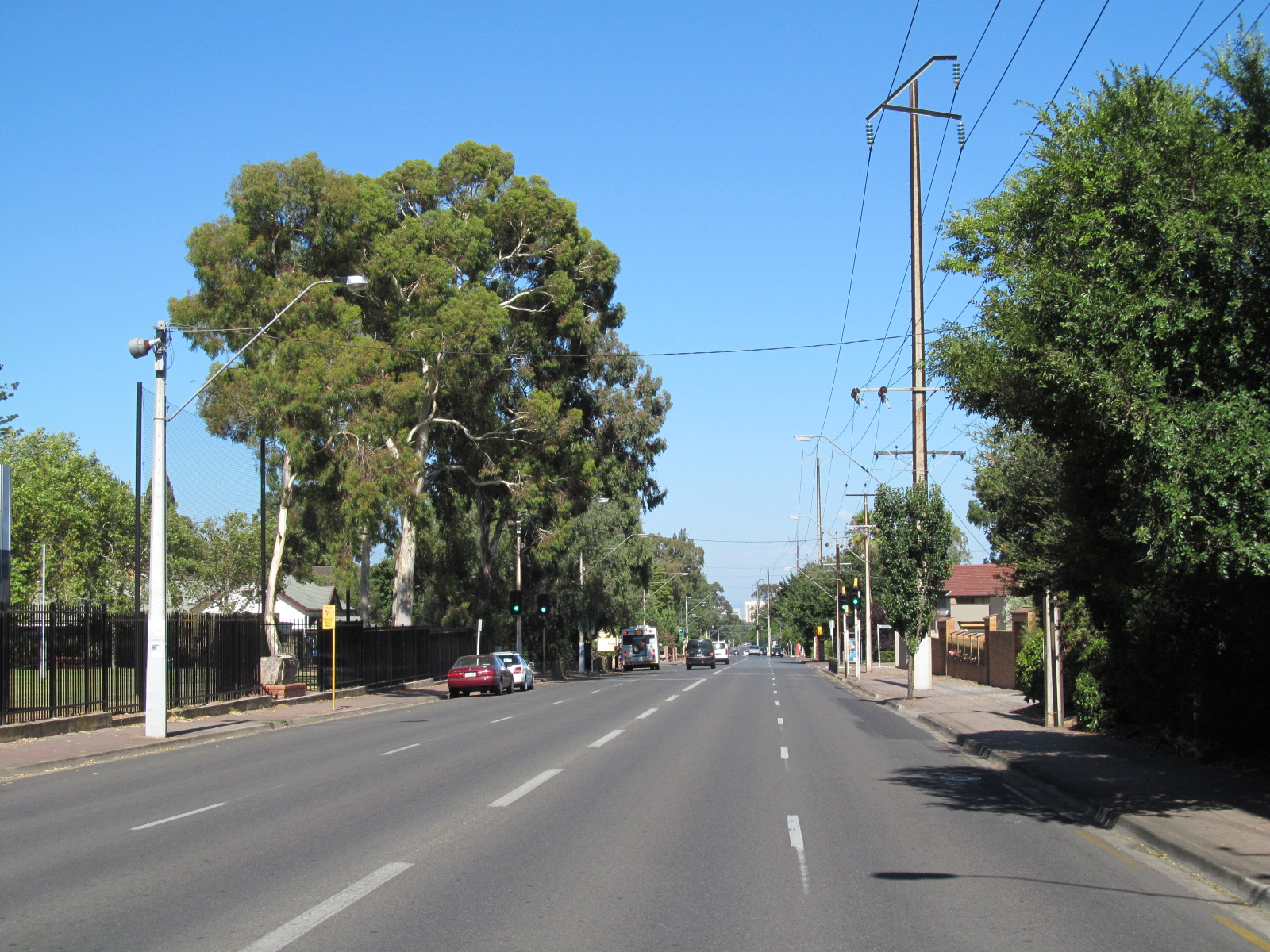
- Kensington Road at Marryatville, looking west.
- Coordinates: 34.927892°S 138.623504°E (West end); 34.930565°S 138.684167°E (East end)

General information
- Type: Road
- Location: Adelaide
- Length: 6.2 km (3.9 mi)
- Opened: c. 1850

Major junctions
- West end: Wakefield Road; Rose Park, Adelaide
- Fullarton Road; Dequetteville Terrace; Portrush Road
- East end: No through road Wattle Park, Adelaide

Location(s)
- Region: Eastern Adelaide
- Major suburbs: Norwood, Leabrook, Erindale, Wattle Park

Kensington Road is a main road in the South Australian capital city of Adelaide, linking the Adelaide city centre to its eastern suburbs.

== Route ==
Its western end, on the edge of the Adelaide city centre, starts at the Britannia Roundabout on the City Ring Route. Kensington Road continues east through Adelaide's eastern suburbs of Leabrook and Erindale, before the road dead-ends at the foot of the western Adelaide Hills in Wattle Park.

== History ==
The establishment of Kensington Road dates back to the 19th century, around the time when the Britannia Hotel at its west end was licensed. Its name was derived from the suburbs it traversed — Kensington, Kensington Park and Kensington Gardens. In 1848, St Matthew's Church was established beside the road at Marryatville. By 1855, the first section was gravelled from the Britannia to Sydenham Road. As the road extended eastward in the following years, a creek needed to be diverted. By 1860, the road was graveled until Osmond Terrace. In 1862, a flood event caused severe damage to bridges crossing the creek. In 1864, a proposal was made to widen the road, however it was declined. The road was widened in 1878 under the decision of W. C. Buik. In 1883, the Adelaide & Suburban Tramway Co. opened a horsecar tram line along Kensington Road to a depot at Marryatville, later extending this line to Burnside via Tusmore Avenue

Motivation to widen the road grew by the following century as the tramways were further developed. The Municipal Tramways Trust decided to build a tramline on Kensington Road in 1907. The route began as a single line from its west end to Burrs Road in the east, with line duplication by the 1910s. Sir Edwin Smith, an advocate for tramway systems, donated part of his land in 1912, to allow for tram-related road widening. The tramline would later be extended from Marryatville to Erindale in 1944, though this section would be replaced by trolley buses by 1953.

In 1900, the Attunga mansion was built on 4.5 acres (1.8 ha) of land at 120 Kensington Road. It was designed by Frederick William Dancker for Benjamin Burford. Burford was a hereditary shareholder of W. H. Burford & Sons, a major soap and candle-making business which had previously operated a factory with large frontage to Kesington Road.

In the 1920s, Kensington Road was bitumenised at an initial cost of 3,000 pounds, with subsequent allocations of 2,500 pounds. In 1925, the Regal Theatre was established at 275 Kensington Road by National Pictures Ltd, with the original name of the Princess Theatre.

In 1936, Sgt. Lionel H. Harrell donated land at the corner of the Portrush Road intersection to the council to allow for widening, in the interest of public safety. A widening scheme was set out for Kensington Road in 1937, with the section from Portrush Road to the Marryatville Hotel (at Shipsters Road) to be widened first. Many street corners were also rounded as part of the scheme to improve road safety. As the government acquired 19 acres of land for Norwood Boys Technical School in 1944, Kensington Road was reluctantly widened there following previous concerns of child safety. Kensington Road was fully resurfaced and sealed in 1954, following the removal of its double tramlines.

In the 1970s, the Royal District Nursing Service operated its headquarters at 139 Kensington Road.

Kensington Road was subject to controversial development by the Shahin family for their OTR headquarters, with over five attempts of approval despite community opposition.

In 2024, a masterplan was proposed to reduce the speed limit along parts of Kensington Road, along with widened footpaths and a landscaped median strip.

== Major intersections ==
LGA	Location	km	mi	Destinations	Notes
Adelaide–Norwood Payneham & St Peters–Burnside tripoint	Adelaide–Kent Town–Norwood–Rose Park quadripoint	0.0	0.0	Fullarton Road (R1 south, unallocated north) – Wattle Park; Dequetteville Terrace (R1 northwest) – North Adelaide; Wakefield Road (west) – Adelaide CBD	Western terminus of road at Britannia Roundabout
Norwood Payneham & St Peters–Burnside boundary	Norwood–Rose Park–Toorak Gardens tripoint	0.8	0.50	Osmond Terrace (north) – Norwood; Prescott Terrace (south) – Dulwich	
Norwood Payneham & St Peters–Burnside boundary	Norwood–Kensington–Toorak Gardens–Marryatville quadripoint	1.6	0.99	Portrush Road (A17) – Northfield, Payneham, Glen Osmond	
Burnside	Wattle Park	6.2	3.9	No through road	Skye Lookout
Route transition
