= Hazelwood Park, South Australia =

Hazelwood Park
- Suburb
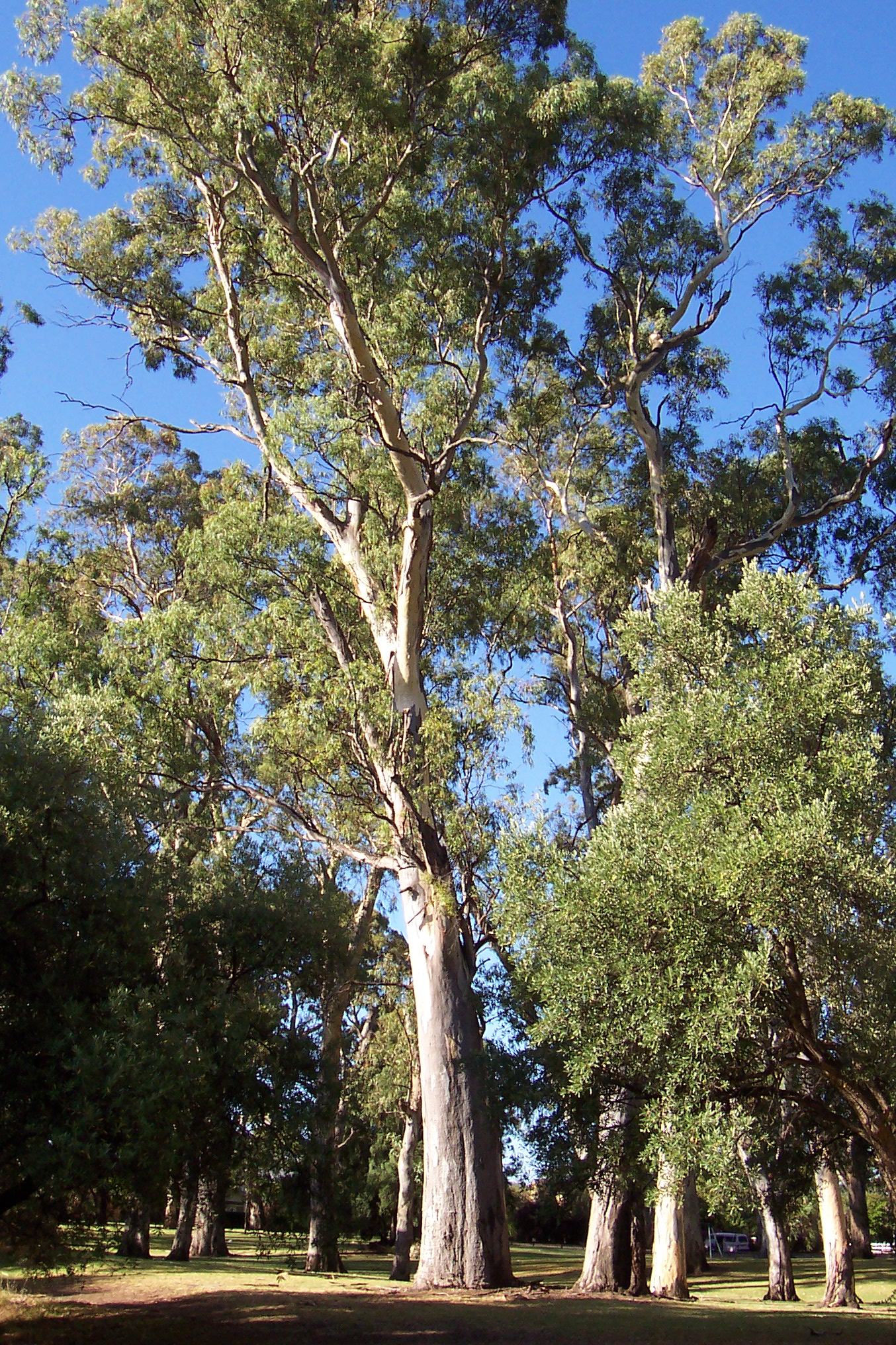
- Old eucalyptus trees, characteristic of the area

- Country: Australia
- State: South Australia
- City: Adelaide
- LGA: City of Burnside
- Established: 1848

Government
  - State electorate: Bragg
  - Federal division: Sturt

Population
  - Total: 1,953 (SAL 2021)
- Postcode: 5066
Suburbs around Hazelwood Park
Heathpool	Leabrook	Erindale
Tusmore	Hazelwood Park	Burnside
Linden Park	Beaumont	Burnside

Hazelwood Park is an upper class suburb in the City of Burnside, Adelaide, South Australia with a census area population of 1,717 people. The suburb is about 5 kilometres east of the Central business district. Hazelwood Park, a suburban park inside the suburb, is the major attraction in the suburb and is the start of the flat country of the Adelaide Plains at the bottom of the Adelaide Hills. Adjacent Howard Terrace is considered to be the end of the Plains and the start of the foothills. Hazelwood Park includes the Burnside Swimming Centre, a popular site in the summer. Much of the remainder of the suburb is residential but there is a small shopping area along Glynburn Road on the eastern edge. The area was first settled by Europeans in 1848 but has seen many community changes over the years.

The suburb is split in half by Greenhill Road, to the north there are residential dwellings and the park. To the south and east are the foothills of the Mount Lofty Ranges with continued residential properties. Hazelwood Park is bounded to the north by Knightsbridge Road, to the east by Glynburn Road, to the south by Cooper Place and to the west by Devereux Road and a line along the back of the blocks between Hazelwood and Tusmore avenues.

== History ==
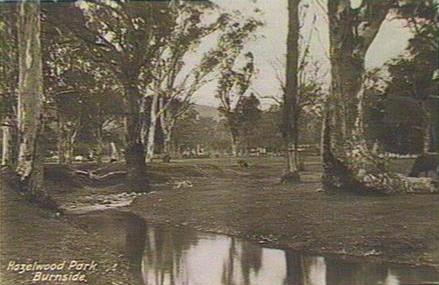
First Creek flowing through Hazelwood Park, 1920

Prior to European settlement, the area that is now Hazelwood Park was part of the traditional lands of the Kaurna people, that stretched from Port Broughton to Cape Jervis. The surrounding area (including the suburbs of Leabrook and Erindale, along with portions of the current suburbs of Burnside) and Hazelwood Park, was originally known by the name Knightsbridge when a village was laid out under that name in 1848. The village was laid out in section 298 in the land between First and Second Creeks. Unlike other more brilliantly designed early villages (such as Beaumont) Knightsbridge was laid out by a Captain Hall, originally from Port Adelaide. He simply divided the land into eight blocks and ran Knightsbridge Road through them. Much of the land was sold to timber merchants, who quickly made use of the suburb's thick bushland. The first house in the suburb, which remains to this day on 12 Hazelwood Avenue, was built by George Taylor, a local grocer, in 1854. Named Knightsbridge House, it was unique in having much of the ground floor situated half-underground to cope with the fierce Australian summers. The total property owned by Taylor amounted to thirty-three acres, which included much of today's suburb. He returned to England in 1856 and leased the property out.

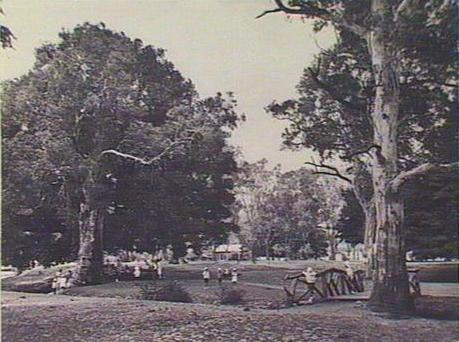
Children playing in Hazelwood Park, 1930

Notably, an orphanage was established on the land by the Sisters of St. Joseph, a Catholic Organisation. They cared for forty to sixty children on the property between the years 1875 and 1887. The orphanage was known for providing much care to the children, with the Adelaide daily the Register noting that 'the good Sisters of St. Joseph were perfect slaves to these children'. With better accommodation provided at Woodville, the orphanage moved and the Knightsbridge farm attempted a sale, but was once again leased out. In the years 1888 to 1950, it was a large dairy farm under the Coote family. The remaining part of section 298, much of it owned by a Mr Debney and not part of Knightbridge Farm, was further subdivided in 1880 and became the village of Leabrook.

The remainder of today's suburb of Hazelwood Park, south of Greenhill Road, was originally known as Linden. It lent its name to today's suburb of Linden Park, and it is notable that Linden Park's name remained so, even after Linden became part of Hazelwood Park. Linden had some of the best arable land in the area, and was a highly sought-after area.

After World War II, with Adelaide rapidly expanding both in the metropolitan region and in the hills area various plans were laid out to replace the windy and dangerous Mount Barker Road. One of these proposals was the Burnside-Crafers Highway, which envisioned leaving Greenhill Road once reaching Hazelwood Park. It was then to pass through Hazelwood Park and Beaumont, wind around the hills of Waterfall Gully and then go over Eagle On The Hill to Crafers. The Burnside Council put much effort into this proposal, widening Linden Avenue (which runs NW to SE) in preparation for the highway. The proposal was eventually rejected in favour of upgrading Mount Barker Road and Linden Avenue remained a huge out-of-place road running through an otherwise peaceful suburb. After years of drivers racing down the 2 km long avenue, the Burnside Council constructed a large median strip in 2005.

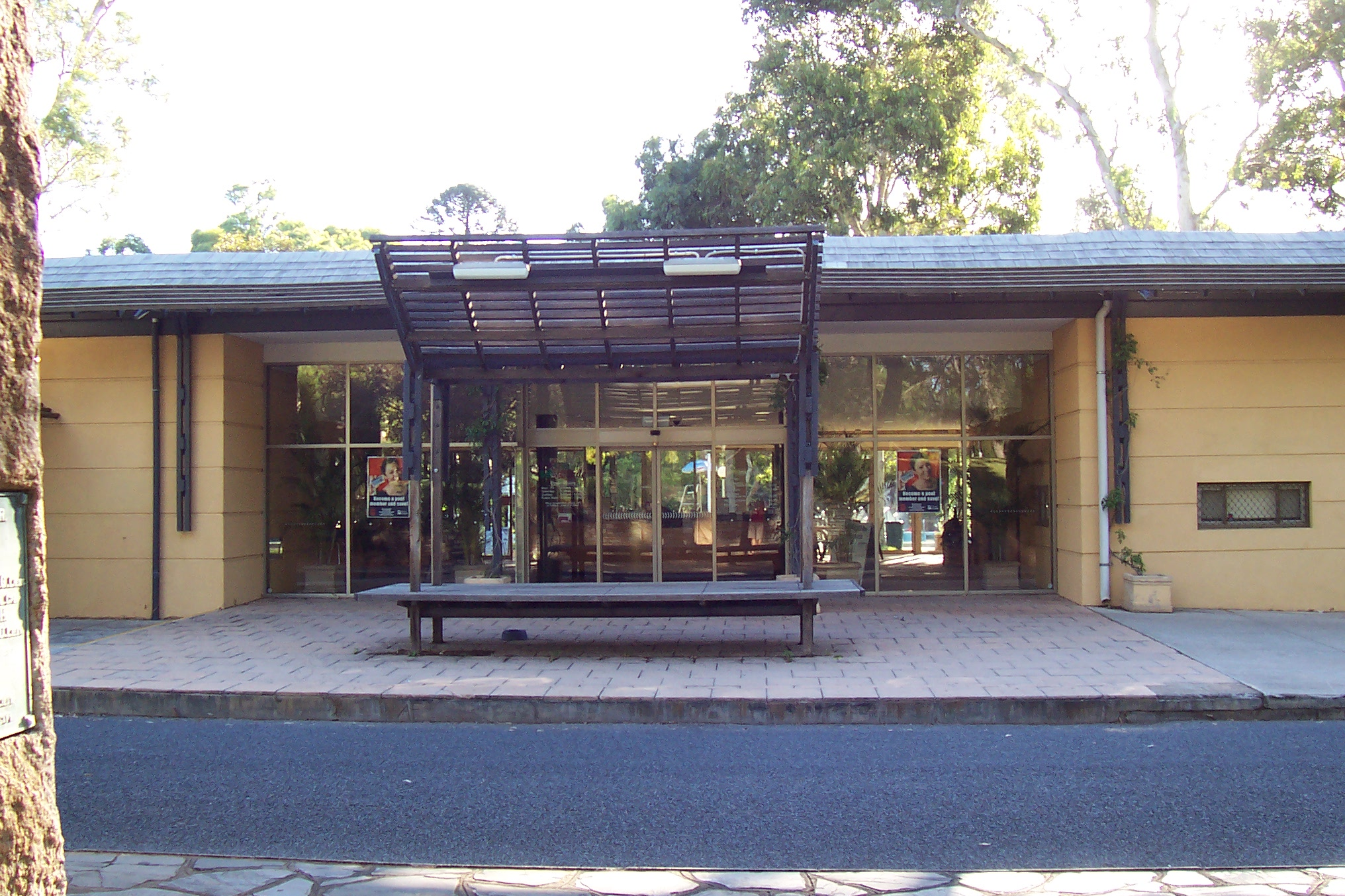
The entrance to the George Bolton (Burnside) Swimming Center after renovations

The actual Hazelwood Park was acquired by the State Government free of charge in July 1915, and gazetted as a 'pleasure resort'. This came from the old Hazelwood estate, owned by the Francis Clark family. They had acquired a residence and 50-acre estate named "Grove Cottage" from Thomas Burr in 1853 and renamed it "Hazelwood", which reflects the name of the school in Birmingham founded by Rowland Hill (postal reformer), a brother of Caroline Clark. The Burnside Council sought to acquire the park from the State Government after finding notes from a government meeting in 1944 that were to see the park sold to a private owner. The Mayor of Burnside at the time, George Bolton, had a grand vision for what the park should become; notably in the construction of an Olympic-sized swimming pool.(Bolton was Mayor from 1952 to 1954 and then from 1962 to 1967) After years of effort, the Burnside Council eventually acquired the park in May 1963 after negotiations with the Premier, Sir Thomas Playford. As part of the acquisition, the Burnside Council was to retain the name 'Hazelwood' and was to maintain the park at a level satisfactory to the State Government. The deed was transferred on 2 January 1964 for the 2.2 ha of Section 298 that is Hazelwood Park. In 1966, after much political wrangling, a 3-pool swimming centre opened at Hazelwood Park. It was named after Mayor George Bolton who had been the leading voice in advocating its construction. The George Bolton Swimming Center remains open to this day, and saw renovations in 1996 which added further facilities.. The park is a State Heritage Item. The SA State Heritage Register lists its significances as follows:

State Heritage Significance: "Hazelwood Park is a portion of the original Hazelwood Park Estate which was owned by the Clark family 1853–1914. During their ownership they allowed the general public to use the area for recreational purposes and it became known as Clark's Paddock. That use was formalized when the family offered to sell it to the South Australian Government provided that it remained a park and the Government purchased it in 1914. In 1915 it was dedicated as a National Pleasure Resort under the National Pleasure Resorts Act 1914, one of the first four places to be dedicated. The Park is significant for being an early National Pleasure Resort and for its association with the Clarks. The Clark family were notable for their involvement in public life. Howard was a leading figure in the Adelaide Philosophical Society and in the Institute movement. He also edited one of the Colony's major newspapers, the 'South Australian Register' 1870–78. Caroline Emily was largely responsible for introducing the system of boarding-out (as opposed to fostering) children from poor families." (HSA 2/01)

== Geography ==
Hazelwood Park's original vegetation was similar to the rest of the area. Blue and Red gum woodland existed primarily to the north of Greenhill Road, while Grey box woodland existed roughly to its south. The Grey box woodland, when still in existence at the time of settlement, was called the 'Black Forest'. The park in the suburb is a good example of the remaining Blue and Red Gum.

Modern vegetation is relatively dense, but contains many introduced floral species. The Burnside Council in recent years has paid particular attention to retaining and planting native plant species when upgrading/maintaining its reserves. This is in stark comparison to past times when native vegetation was replaced by European species in keeping with the wishes of the then population. First Creek, which has its origins in the Mount Lofty Ranges and Adelaide Hills flows through both the suburb and the park. It is a seasonal creek and runs dry throughout much of the summer months. The creek winds down from Waterfall Gully, through Burnside into Hazelwood Park and then continues on to join the River Torrens near the Adelaide Botanical Gardens. Apart from Hazelwood Park, the only other notable reserve is the Ray Cooper Gardens, situated near the midpoint of Linden Avenue.

== Transport ==
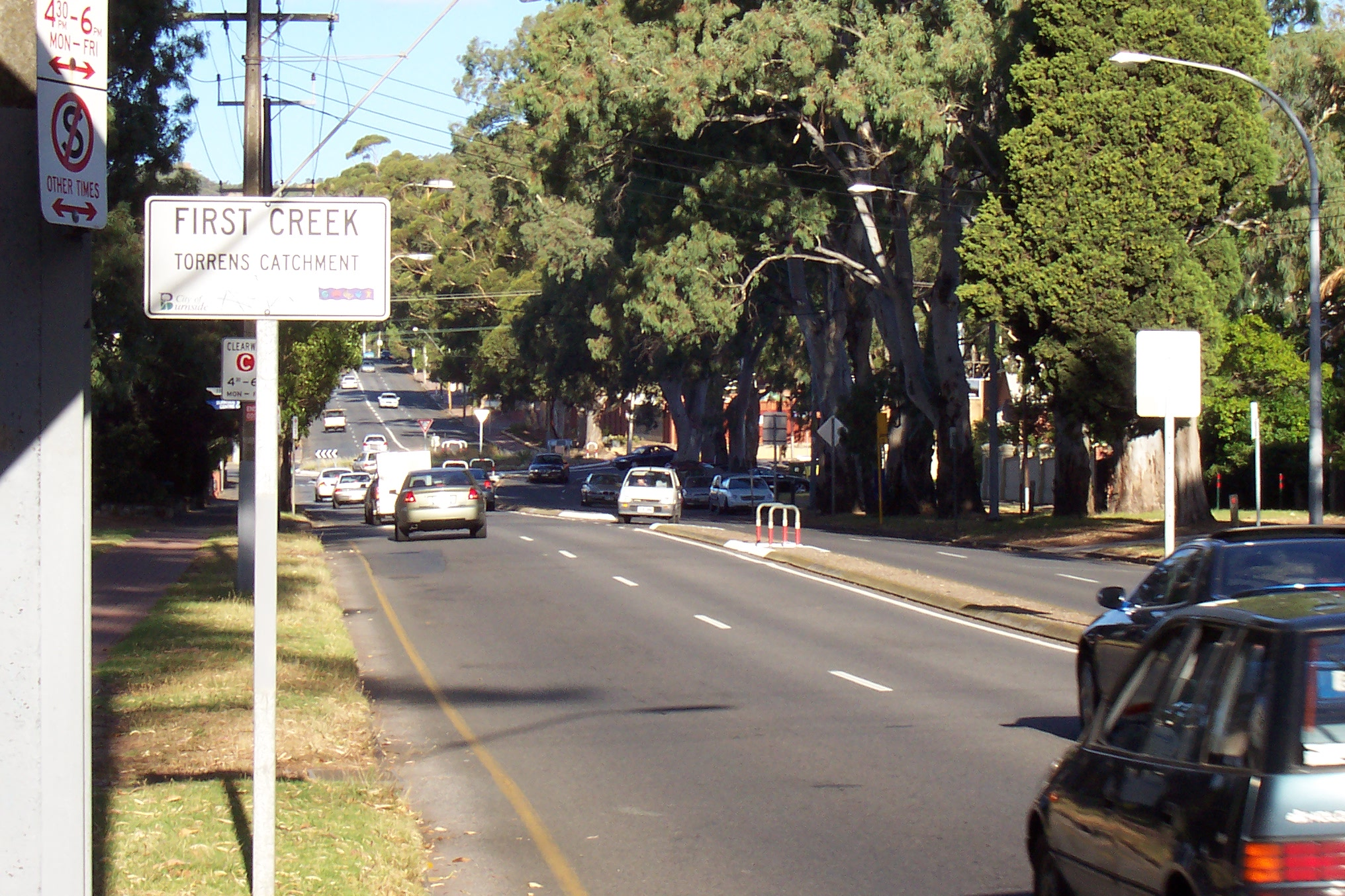
Greenhill Road bordering Hazelwood Park looking east towards the Glynburn Road roundabout

Traffic congestion is relatively light in Hazelwood Park and only occurs during peak periods on the two main thoroughfares, Greenhill and Glynburn Roads. The city can typically be reached in ten minutes, and fifteen in peak periods using Greenhill Road. Like most Adelaide suburbs, the major roads have a 60 km/h speed limit and the side streets a 50 km/h limit. Hazelwood Park's road network (with few exceptions) follows the usual Adelaide grid pattern.

Only 7.5% took the bus to work, using Adelaide Metro buses, the only public transport in the suburb. Normal routes into the CBD are by the 142 or 147 which both run into or close to the suburb. The 820/821 bus travels from the Adelaide Hills into the CBD along Greenhill Road. Buses typically run on 30-minute intervals during weekdays and one-hour intervals at other times. Unfortunately, due to the heavy emphasis on car transport in the area, the bus routes are limited and under-developed, particularly compared to the efficient public transit links to the rest of metropolitan Adelaide.

== Residents ==
Percentages of the quarter of the population born abroad

According to the 2021 Census the population of the Hazelwood Park census area was 1,953 people. Approximately 51.0% of the population were female, 68.2% are Australian born, and the median age is 43. Hazelwood Park has an educated population with over 40% of the population holding a degree or diploma. This level of education attainment is reflected in the suburb's employment patterns: the most popular industries for employment were Education, Cafes and Restaurants, Health and Community Services, finance, insurance, and business services. The median weekly household income is $2,300 or more per week, compared with $1,455 in Adelaide overall.

Hazelwood Park has a higher than average stable family population with a large segment of both children and their mature aged parents. Most residences are family occupied but the number of older empty-nesters (whose children have left home) is growing. Retired population is relatively low, but continuing to grow. 76.3% of dwellings were detached houses but this figure is falling in favour of attached dwellings. Subdivisions are also becoming very much of a common sight in recent years. The number of development approvals has been falling since the 2001–02 financial year.

== Attractions ==
The biggest attraction in the suburb is the park and accompanying Burnside Swimming Centre. This location is only open through summertime because it is an outdoor pool and is very popular on hot days in Adelaide (greater than 30^{0}C) when it is open late. First creek continues its journey from the hills through the park, the water flowing from Waterfall Gully and into Tusmore. The creek cuts through the middle of the park and is dammed at one point to create a pond. This is a popular place for children to feed the ducks and families to sit by. There is one playground in the north-east of the park and there are several sets of tables and a few barbecues dotted throughout the park. The park is relatively large by local standards and there are no playing fields. It is more strongly characterised by massive old Gum trees that can be seen from blocks away. Although it has good facilities, it is normally not as popular as the nearby smaller Tusmore Park. It is also the location of a very popular traditional carols night, held annually on the first Sunday in December.

Hazelwood Park contains a number of small commercial precincts, concentrated around the Glynburn/Greenhill Road roundabout. The area was known previously as The Feathers, and many stores have adopted this moniker into their names. The shops situated along Greenhill Road are part of the Feathers Shopping Center. At the western corner of Greenhill and Glynburn is a medium-sized commercial centre. Opposite this complex to the north is the Feathers Hotel, the only one in the immediate area, situated in the neighbouring suburb of Burnside. Larger shopping complexes in the area are located outside of the suburb – at nearby Burnside Village, Marryatville Shopping Center and the Norwood Parade.

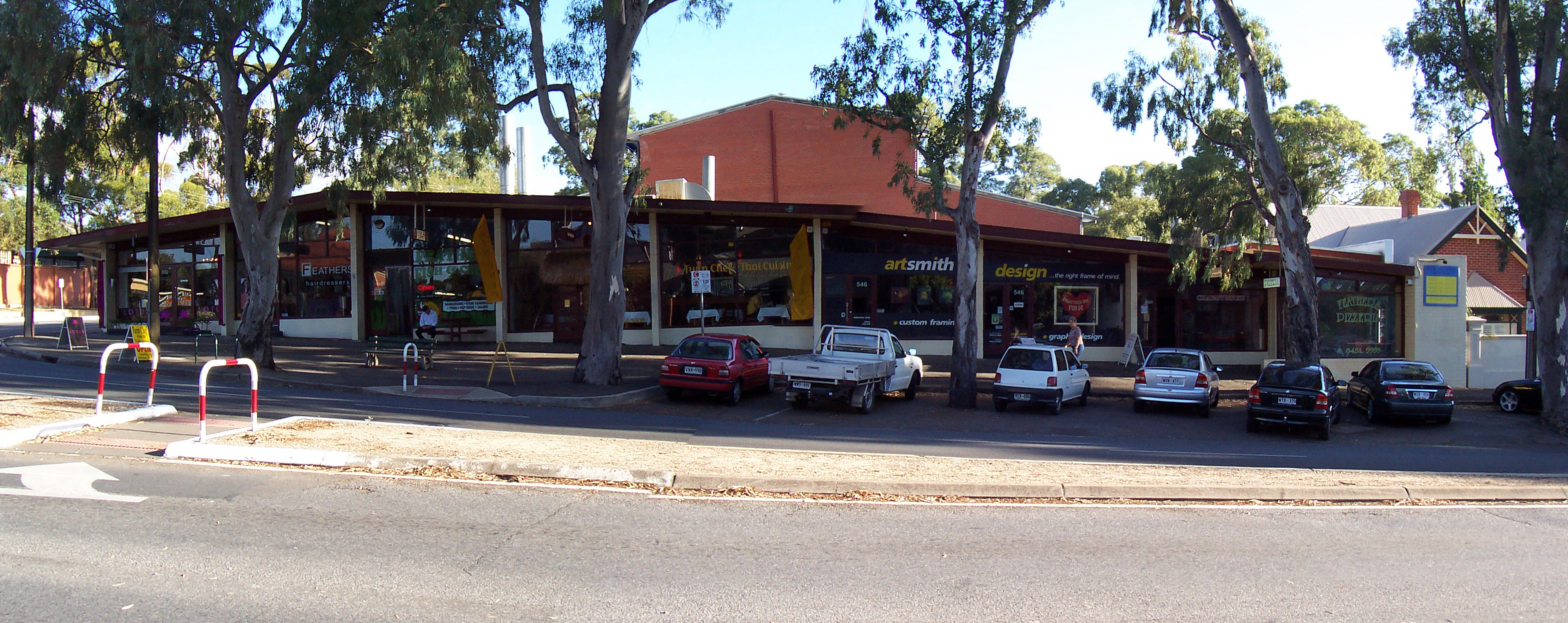
Shops in the Feathers shopping center, along Greenhill Road

.

== Politics ==
2002 state election
Liberal	65%
Labor	20%
Democrats	10%
Family First	2.5%
SA First	2.5%

2004 federal election
Liberal	65%
Labor	25%
Greens	5%
Democrats	2.5%
Family First	2.5%

Hazelwood Park is part of the state electoral district of Bragg, which has been held since 2002 by Liberal MP Vickie Chapman. In federal politics, the suburb is part of the division of Sturt, and has been represented by Christopher Pyne since 1993. The results shown are from the closest polling station to Hazelwood Park – which is located outside of the suburb – at St David's Church Hall on nearby Glynburn Road (Burnside).

Similar to the rest of the City of Burnside, Hazelwood Park's political leanings are overwhelmingly in favour of the Liberal Party. This could be attributed to the Liberal Party's traditional middle-upper class support base, of which Hazelwood Park easily fits the bill. The Australian Democrats vote was substantial (running at about 10%) until the party was crushed in the 2004 Elections. Minor party showings are on par with the national average and the Labor party consistently picks up only one fifth to a quarter of votes.

== Notes ==
1. History of the City of Burnside
2. Elizabeth Warburton, The Paddocks Beneath
3. Ozroads: Princes Highway History
4. City of Burnside Capital Works: New Roadworks Projects
5. City of Burnside – Street Names and Origins. Retrieved 11/2/06
6. Elizabeth Warburton, The Paddocks Beneath
7. Native Vegetation of the City of Burnside
8. City of Burnside Community Profile for Hazelwood Park / Tusmore: How do we get to work? Archived 26 September 2007 at the Wayback Machine
9. City of Burnside Community Profile for Hazelwood Park / Tusmore: How many people live here? Archived 26 September 2007 at the Wayback Machine
10. Lions Club Burnside – What we do
11. Burnside Swimming Centre
12. State Election 2002 – Polling Booth Results (Burnside, Bragg), courtesy State Electoral Commission
13. Federal Election 2004 – Polling Booth Results (Burnside, Sturt), courtesy Australian Electoral Commission
