= Tusmore, South Australia =

Tusmore
- Suburb
- Country: Australia
- State: South Australia
- City: Adelaide
- LGA: City of Burnside
- Location: 6 km (3.7 mi) from Adelaide
- Established: 1839

Government
  - State electorate: Bragg
  - Federal division: Sturt

Population
  - Total: 1,503 (SAL 2021)
- Postcode: 5065
Suburbs around Tusmore
| Toorak Gardens | Heathpool; Leabrook | Erindale |
| Toorak Gardens | Tusmore | Hazelwood Park; Burnside |
| Glenside | Linden Park | Linden Park |

Tusmore is a suburb in the inner east of Adelaide, South Australia.

== History ==
In 1839, a pastoralist William Rogers, settled in the area and named his land Tusmore after his birthplace in Oxfordshire, England.

In 1911 the area roughly corresponding to modern-day Tusmore, known as Section 291, was owned by the Colonial Board of Advice of the South Australian Company. In that year the Board subdivided the land, and several streets in Tusmore are named after board members from that time: Bakewell, Barr-Smith, Brandreth, Fisher, Kennaway and Stirling.

The Tusmore Post Office was in the Council offices for many years, until a new building erected on the corner plot located diagonally opposite the Portrush Road /Greenhill Road junction in 1951 retained the name, despite being located in Glenside, until 1967.

== Facilities ==
A recreational park, Tusmore Park, straddles the suburbs of Tusmore and Heathpool. It has a public children's paddling pool, large grassed areas which may be used for ball games, five tennis courts, a children's playground, seating areas and electric barbecues. First Creek, dry in summer, runs through the park, and a Scout hall is situated adjacent on the western side.

The building complex housing the Burnside Civic Centre, Council Chambers, Burnside Community Centre, Ballroom and Library, is on the corner of Portrush Road and Greenhill Road.

The Burnside City Uniting Church faces Portrush Road.
