= Dulwich, South Australia =

Dulwich
- Suburb
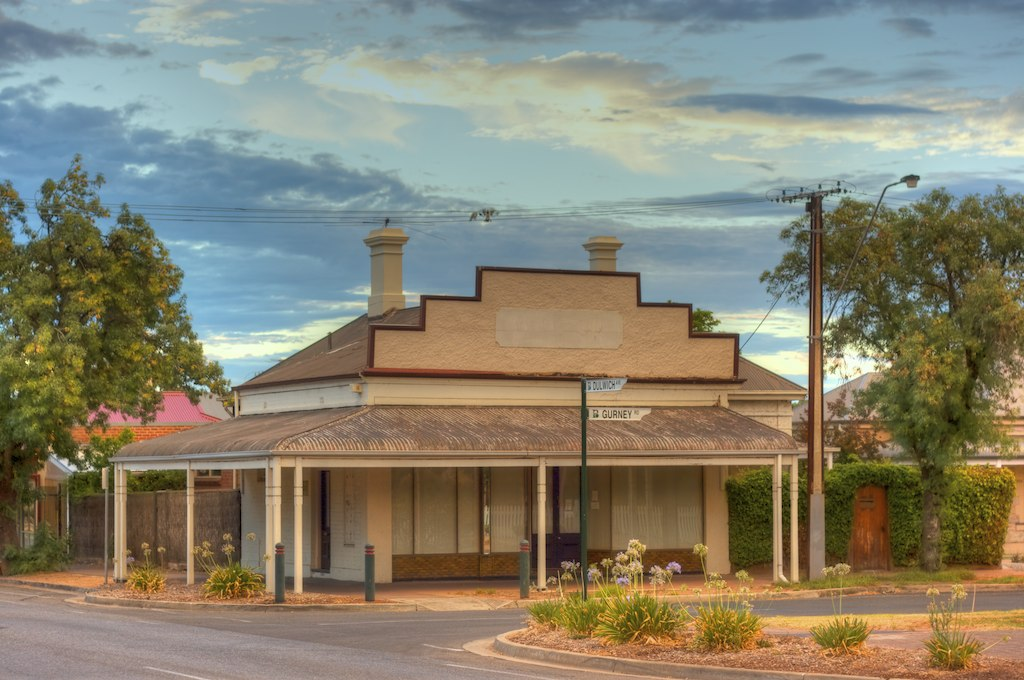
- Corner of Dulwich Ave and Gurney Rd

- Interactive map of Dulwich
- Country: Australia
- State: South Australia
- City: Adelaide
- LGA: City of Burnside
- Established: 1854

Government
  - State electorate: Dunstan
  - Federal division: Sturt

Population
  - Total: 1,659 (SAL 2021)
- Postcode: 5065
Suburbs around Dulwich
Adelaide (Parklands)	Rose Park	Toorak Gardens
Adelaide (Parklands)	Dulwich	Toorak Gardens
Eastwood	Glenside	Glenside

Dulwich /ˈdʌlɪtʃ/ is a suburb in the City of Burnside, Adelaide, South Australia with a census area population of 2,663 people. The suburb is adjacent to Adelaide's east parklands, and forms part of the western boundary of the City of Burnside. Dulwich is a mix of residential housing and commercial activity–corporate offices and businesses line Fullarton and Greenhill Roads. The suburb is bordered by Rose Park to the north, Toorak Gardens to the east, Glenside to the south and the Adelaide Parklands to the west.

The area, which was settled by Europeans in the 19th century and used as pasture, made a slow transition to a residential suburb which was complete by the mid 20th century. Much of the area's 19th century housing stock has been recognised with heritage protection. Dulwich's close location to the Adelaide city centre, grand old houses and leafy tree-lined streets make it an attractive and sought-after suburb.

British politician Tony Blair, who served as the Prime Minister of the United Kingdom from 1997 to 2007, spent several of his early years in Dulwich during his father's time as a law lecturer at the University of Adelaide.

== History ==
Prior to European settlement, the general area was inhabited by the Kaurna tribe of Indigenous Australians.

Dulwich, named after the settlement in the London Borough of Southwark, has its origins in Section 263 of the Adelaide region as laid out by South Australia's first chief surveyor, Colonel William Light. It was bought by a Captain of the Royal Navy, Daniel Pring. In his initial absence the section was leased to a local cattle dealer, but upon the early death of Pring, his wife inherited the area. After several transactions the land was sold; John Hector, manager of the Savings Bank of South Australia bought much of the land with the exception of that located around Victoria Park. It was Hector who christened the land as the 'Village of Dulwich', or in the colloquial terms of the time, 'Hector's Paddock'. Hector oversaw the subdivision of the land and its transfer to many new owners. The Adelaide press at the time, in the form of the Advertiser and the South Australian Gazetter, was exceptionally generous in their words relating to the new village: 'The Suburban Village of Dulwich ... beautifully situated on a gentle rise sufficient to command a view of the sea, with the noble amphitheatre of the hills for a background', 'For building sites convenient to the metropolis, Dulwich has no rival'.

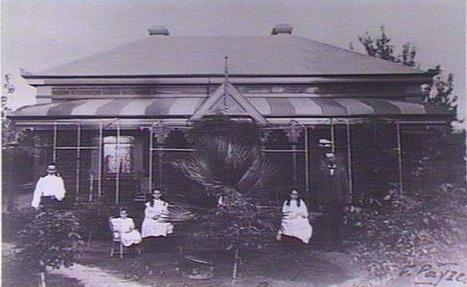
House in Dulwich, 1908. The style is representative of many houses found in suburban Adelaide, bringing a distinct uniformity to the area.

While Dulwich in 1881 was only home to four residences, by 1891, after a period of explosive growth, there were 50. Businesses began to establish themselves in Dulwich during the early part of the 20th century. By the 1930s, Dulwich was home to manufacturers, blacksmiths, engineers and other groups. This business establishment experienced a surge in the latter part of the 20th century, and offices and businesses now completely line the two major road borders (Greenhill and Fullarton Roads), attracted there by the close proximity to the Adelaide city centre and the lush surroundings.

With many sons of the suburb fighting in World War II, a Returned Services League was founded with their return. Eventually the league building became that of the Dulwich Retired Citizens Club, and with its purchase by the Burnside Council, it has become the Dulwich Community Centre. Between 1955 and 1958, a young Tony Blair (British Prime Minister 1997–2007) lived with his family in a house on Ormond Grove while his father Leo was a Law lecturer at the University of Adelaide.

== Demographics ==
Percentages of the fifth of the population born abroad

According to the 2001 Census, the population of the Dulwich census area (which includes adjoining Rose Park) is 2,663 people, with a very slight decrease in population between the 1996 and 2001 censuses. 52.4% of the population is female, 79.4% are Australian born (see chart for a breakdown of foreign-born) and 92.5% of residents are Australian citizens. Religious adherence in Dulwich is lower than the Burnside and Adelaide average, standing at 64.3%. The eight strongest religions in decreasing order are; Catholic, Anglican, Uniting Church, Orthodox, Lutheran, Presbyterian, Buddhism and Hinduism. The most common type of dwelling was a Separate House (64.4%) followed by a flat, apartment or other (24.9%) and a semi-detached house (9.6%). Dulwich has a highly educated population with 44.5% holding a diploma or higher degree. This educational attainment is reflected in household income - almost two-thirds earn over A$1000 per week.

Similar to other inner-city suburbs, Dulwich has a large proportion of students who attend nearby universities (9.2%). Overseas students are a sizeable component of this population and represent some of the 7.5% of residents who are not Australian citizens. 60% of households represent families with children; the remaining households are divided among couples without children, lone person households and other non-traditional groupings.

== Transport ==
Cars are the dominant means of transport to work in Dulwich; 70% of the population are either a driver or passenger in a vehicle. 10% walked, cycled or caught public transport. Public transport usage is notably higher than the City of Burnside and Adelaide average, owing to the suburb's close inner-city location. A number of bus routes serve the suburb: the 144 travels to Glen Osmond through Dulwich, as does the 147 to Beaumont; the 580 route travels from Mile End to Paradise Interchange along Portrush Road; the 820 Hills bus travels along Greenhill Road to Carey Gully. 10% of the population owns no vehicles, 40% owns one, 35% owns two and the remainder own three or more. One early problem with Adelaide's streets built in a grid layout was the tendency for motorists to use inner suburb local roads instead of main roads. 'Rat trails' of cars sneaked through narrow sidestreets, creating sizeable bottlenecks. This was a particular problem for Dulwich because of its location - various traffic control methods were put in place (closing streets, speed bumps, lowered speed limits, roundabouts) to counter these problems. This forced the re-routing of traffic onto local thoroughfares such as Fullarton, Greenhill, Kensington and Portrush Roads.

== Government ==
State elections
Liberal	58%
Labor	25%
Democrats	13%
Family First	2%
SA First	2%

Federal elections
Liberal	60%
Labor	30%
Greens	7%
Democrats	1.5%
Family First	1.5%

Dulwich is part of the state Electoral District of Bragg, which has been held since 2002 by Liberal MP Vickie Chapman. In federal politics, the suburb is part of the Division of Adelaide, and has been represented by Labor MP Kate Ellis since 2004. The results shown are from the closest polling station to Dulwich – which is located outside of the suburb – at Rose Park Primary School in nearby Rose Park.

Dulwich is a socially moderate and economically liberal suburb. The centre-right Liberal Party polls very well in the area with around 60% of the vote in the 2007 and 2010 federal elections. The area previously had a relatively strong Democrat vote, until very poor results in the federal election of 2004 and the state election of 2006. The Labor Party and the Greens have absorbed much of the former Democrat vote.

At the council level, Dulwich is part of the Rose Park & Toorak Gardens Ward of the City of Burnside.

== Facilities ==
Facilities include Dulwich Community Centre, St. Patrick's Special School, and the Dulwich Centre (also known as Dulwich Village). The Catholic Church in the suburb is dedicated to St Peter Claver.

== Notes ==
1. City of Burnside Community Profile for Dulwich/Rose Park
2. City of Burnside Community Profile for Dulwich/Rose Park: How do we get to work?
