= Beaumont, South Australia =

Beaumont
- Suburb
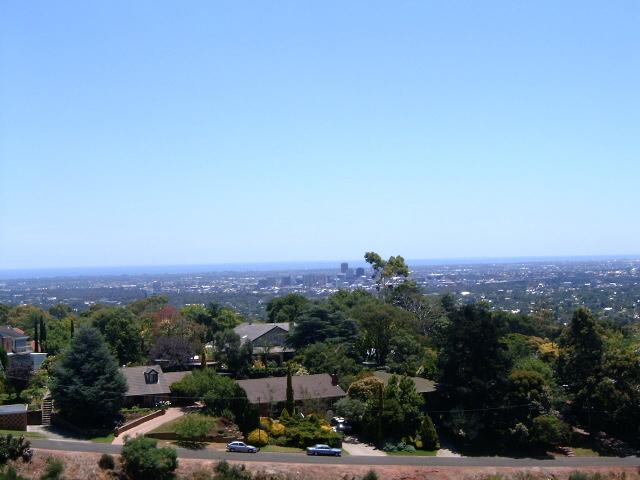

- Coordinates: 34°57′04″S 138°39′40″E
- Country: Australia
- State: South Australia
- City: Adelaide
- LGA: City of Burnside

Government
  - State electorate: Bragg
  - Federal division: Sturt

Population
  - Total: 2,731 (SAL 2021)
- Postcode: 5066
Suburbs around Beaumont
Linden Park	Hazelwood Park	Burnside
St Georges	Beaumont	Waterfall Gully
Glen Osmond	Mount Osmond	Waterfall Gully

Beaumont is a hillside suburb of Adelaide in the City of Burnside, on the eastern side of the city. Established in 1848, it has always been known as an affluent suburb. It has a notable park known as Beaumont Common.

== History ==
Before British colonisation of South Australia and subsequent European settlement, Beaumont was inhabited by one of the groups who later collectively became known as the Kaurna peoples.

Founded as a purpose-built village by Sir Samuel Davenport in 1848, Beaumont initially struggled due to high land prices in the area. However, with Adelaide's inevitable expansion, residents eventually settled. The early village had quite a cosmopolitan flavour–although predominantly Anglo-Celtic like most of Australia at that point, many of Beaumont's early residents were veterans of the Royal Navy or Army or had lived in other countries for some time.

Edward Burton Gleeson, the founder of the Mid North town of Clare originally owned a farm within the boundaries of Beaumont in the early 1840s, which he named "Gleeville". He became insolvent, sold the property to Davenport in 1842 and moved to his country property "Inchiquin" in the Clare Valley region. Beaumont House, constructed around 1850 for Augustus Short, still stands and is now owned by the National Trust of South Australia.

The original village was centred on a small park known as the "Beaumont Common" (or to residents simply as "The Common").

In 1905 the Girls' Probationary School, which was run by the Salvation Army for the state government and originally established in 1901 at Woodville, was moved to "Sea View House" in Beaumont. The institution housed girls who were wards of the state and had been classed as having behavioural problems – usually owing to truancy. After residents complained about the school "lowering the moral tone" of Burnside Primary School nearby, the girls were moved to premises in Norwood in 1910, before moving to its final destination in Fullarton in 1912.

then for two years at (1910), moved to 39 Florence Street, Fullarton. Run by the Salvation Army for the state government, it housed girls who were wards of the state classed as having behavioural problems – usually owing to truancy.

The suburb has now expanded south-east in the direction of the hills, with newer developments now on the face of the Adelaide Hills.

== Beaumont Common ==
Beaumont Common was an English-style common. Ownership of the Common was originally vested in trust only for those residents living within the Village of Beaumont, that is the bounds of Cooper Place, Beaumont Road (now Glynburn Road), Dashwood Road and Devereaux Road (as if it actually continued due south to Dashwood instead of meandering to the east at West Tce). Originally it was fenced and gated with the key being available only to residents of the Village of Beaumont. The fence and gates were removed in the early 20th century. The trust deed was lodged at the Land Titles Office Adelaide. Trustees remaining on the death of a trustee appointed a successor by unanimous not majority vote. The last trustees included the late Alfred Scammell (of Fauldings) and J B Cleland. They appointed Burnside Council a co-trustee following an undertaking by Council to maintain The Common as an open space public park. As the remaining trustees aged, Burnside Council then attempted many times to instead build on the Common, against the wishes of Beaumont residents.

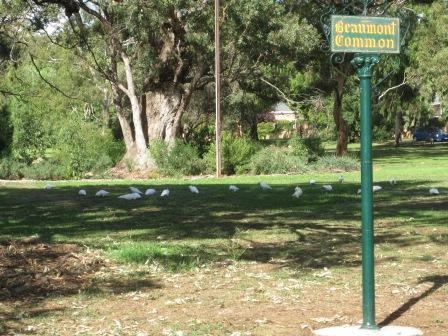
Beaumont Common

Residents were successful in ensuring what later became the JB Cleland Kindergarten, the George Bolton Swimming Centre Burnside (Hazelwood Park), the Beaumont Uniting Church Tennis Courts and the Beaumont Bowling Club were all erected elsewhere. Several attempts over the years to build public lavatories and entertainment facilities were also rebuffed. Burnside Council refused to agree to any further trustee appointments as trustees died. The remaining trustees attempted to appoint Gordon Ditter (of Ditters Fruit and Nuts). Council refused. Fearing an attempt to obtain control of the Common by attrition, residents petitioned the State Government in 1971 to remove Burnside Council as a trustee by act of SA Parliament. Burnside Council objected. Several heated meetings between Council and residents ensured. To resolve the impasse the state government declared Beaumont Common a public park under the Parks and Gardens Act, with clauses prohibiting any future building to ever take place on Beaumont Common. Later revisions of the Act have had those clauses removed. No resident consultation on their removal took place.

== In popular culture ==
Beaumont is mentioned in the Redgum song "Beaumont Rag" featured on the band's 1978 album If You Don't Fight You Lose, which also features on their live album Caught in the Act. The song is aimed at satirising the Liberal Party voters who live in the affluent suburb, after their party under Malcolm Fraser had been defeated in a general election.
