= Marryatville, South Australia =

Suburb of Adelaide, Australia

Marryatville
- Suburb
- Interactive map of Marryatville
- Country: Australia
- State: South Australia
- City: Adelaide
- LGA: City of Norwood Payneham St Peters

Government
  - State electorate: South Australia

Population
  - Total: 648 (SAL 2021)
- Postcode: 5068
Suburbs around Marryatville
	Kensington
Toorak Gardens	Marryatville	Leabrook
	Heathpool

Marryatville is a small suburb about 4–5 kilometres (2.5–3.1 mi) east of Adelaide's central business district, in the local council area of City of Norwood Payneham St Peters. Comprising low- to medium-density housing, two large schools (Marryatville High and Loreto College), a church, and several shops, including the Marryatville Shopping Centre. It also has two creeks running through it. The first European settler on the land was George Brunskill in 1839, with part of the land purchased and laid out as a village in 1848 by James Philcox. He named it after Augusta Sophia Marryat, wife of the fifth Governor of South Australia, Sir Henry Young, after their arrival in the colony in 1848. Among the heritage-listed buildings in the suburb, the historic home Eden Park is now part of Marryatville High School, and The Acacias is part of Loreto College. Hackett's Nursery was in operation from 1854 until 1952, alongside what is now Hackett Terrace.

== Location ==
The suburb is bounded by Portrush Road in the west, Kensington Road to the north, Tusmore Avenue to the east, and Alnwick Terrace/Romney Road to the south. Along with neighbouring Heathpool to the south and Kensington to the north, it is part of the City of Norwood Payneham St Peters (NPSP) council area, adjoining the City of Burnside suburbs Leabrook and Toorak Gardens on the eastern and western sides.

== Creeks ==
Both First and Second Creek, originating in the Adelaide Hills, run through the suburb. First Creek surfaces on the northern side of Alnwick Terrace, within the Marryatville High School grounds, then flows through the grounds and out under The Crescent, while Second Creek passes under Hackett Terrace at its northern end, flowing through several properties on either side of the road before being canalised. Severe floods in November 2005 overflowed both creeks' banks and caused some damage to both MHS and Loreto, as well as some houses.

== General history ==
=== Early history of the area ===
Before British colonisation of South Australia and subsequent European settlement, Marryatville was inhabited by one of the groups who later collectively became known as the Kaurna peoples.

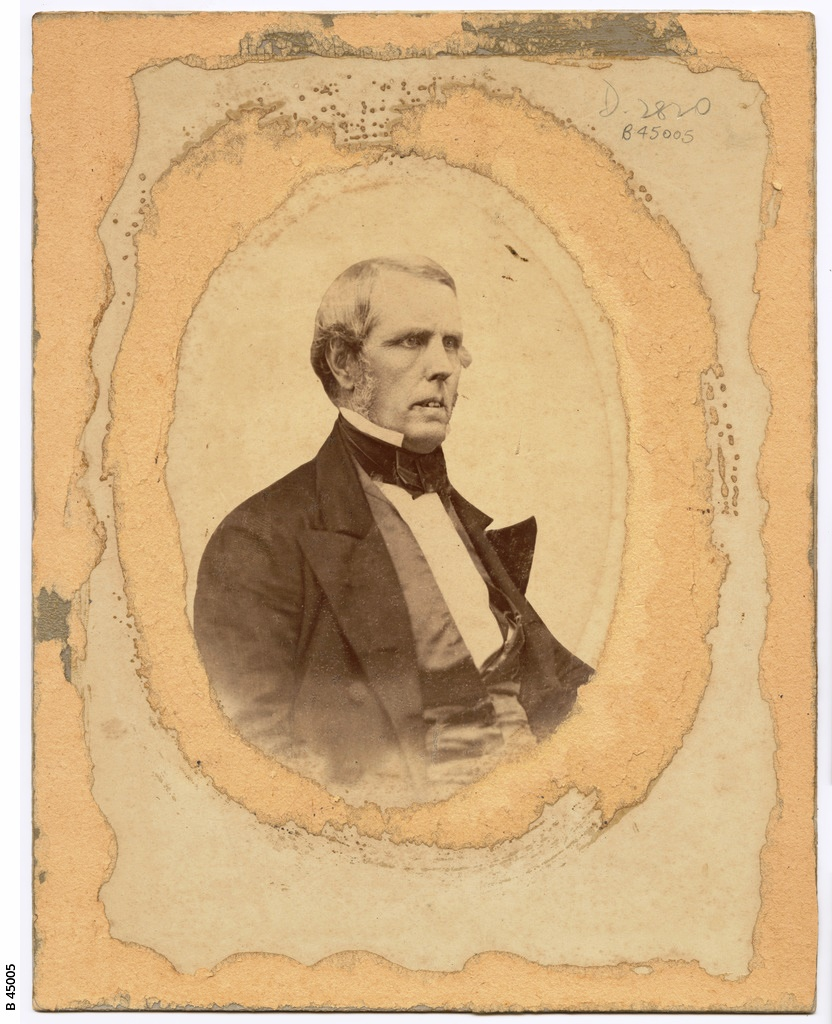
George Brunskill, c.1850

George Brunskill (1799–1866), left Sandford, Cumbria (then in the historic county of Westmorland) with his wife Sarah (née Apsey), departing London in November 1838 on board the Thomas Harrison and arriving in Port Adelaide in February 1839. Both of their young children died before the ship sailed. Brunskill first "leased a portion of section 290, comprising 66 acres (27 ha), from the South Australian Company with a right to purchase the freehold", in the area now known as Marryatville. An undated document, estimated c.1840 by the State Library, shows a mortgage agreement for the sum of £300 between Brunskill and the Savings Bank of South Australia, describing an eight-roomed brick home to be built on 6.5 acres.

In a letter written in August 1839, Brunskill describes the countryside as "magnificent" after rains, with trees, flowers, vegetables all flourishing. The settler population of Adelaide is reported as 8,250. In a letter the following April, he says that in contrast to when they arrived, when the area was almost totally uninhabited, they were now surrounded by neighbours. His 67 acres leased from the Company provide lizards and goannas for "excellent eating", and he says that "the Blacks" (the local Kaurna people) hardly ever come near them, are "harmless" and do not steal; he lent an axe which was promptly returned. He later (June–July 1840) describes their house, comprising three bedrooms and other features which will make it "the best in the colony".

On 31 August 1850, 46 acres (19 ha) were registered in Brunskill's name, with the other 20 acres (8.1 ha) purchased on 25 September 1848 by James Philcox, who laid out the "Village of Marryatville". This followed an announcement in the press in July of the engagement of "Miss Marryat, niece of the Lord Bishop of Adelaide" to Sir Henry Young, the new governor of Adelaide, before their departure from England. The suburb's name thus came from Augusta Sophia Marryat, wife of the fifth Governor of South Australia, Sir Henry Young, after their arrival in the colony in 1848. Augusta was the niece of the novelist Captain Frederick Marryat, and sister of Charles Marryat, who from 1887 to 1906 was Dean of Adelaide. Her mother was Caroline Short, whose brother, Augustus Short, was the first Anglican bishop of Adelaide. Philcox was probably responsible also for naming Burwash Road, after his home town of Burwash in Sussex.

Brunskill's property ran from Portrush Road (then called Glen Osmond Road) to Ringmore Road (now called Dudley Road), and the village to the east of that. The records mention a church (St Matthew's Anglican Church, built in 1848, consecrated in 1849) to the west of the village, and company-owned lands to the east. In the village, one of the first buildings was the Marryatville Hotel, a single-storey building on the southern side. This was near the building which still stands, built in 1908 on the site of a brewery and used as a police station until 1971, and today by private businesses. Woodcutters would gather there on their way back from a day's work in the hills.

The village was advertised on 23 September 1848 as:

Twenty acres of the very best land most salubriously situate in the above-mentioned township. A splendid stream of water runs through the property besides which good spring water may be obtained in wells 26 feet (7.9 m) depth. It adjoins the elegant church of Kensington on the west and the residence of the Honourable the Colonial Secretary (then Alfred Mundy) on the north, the celebrated Glen Osmond and other mineral lands on the south and those of the South Australian Company on the east.

In 1851, George Hall founded one of South Australia's first aerated waters companies in Ringmore (now Dudley) Road. In 1872 the company, then known as Geo. Hall & Sons, moved to Edward Street, Norwood. The highly successful company's Halls label produced soft drinks, surviving for 149 years.

Heathpool was one of three large properties, along with Eden Park and The Acacias, which made up Marryatville.

The Kensington line was the first of several trams in Adelaide, firstly horse-drawn (1878) and later electrified. There was a tram terminus in Marryatville, near the home of state Treasurer Lavington Glyde, who often travelled home with fellow politicians Wentworth Cavenagh and Sir Edwin Smith.

=== 20th century ===
In 1919, St Matthew's church was renovated, maintaining as many original features as possible. A roll of honour of the World War I war dead was added to a wall, and a new organ was installed in honour of former warden George E. Stevens.

In 1923 Sun Street was widened from a 19-foot (5.8 m) lane to a 40-foot (12 m) road, and renamed Hackett Terrace, after the nursery.

In 1937, Alfred Traeger, inventor of the pedal radio, moved his workshop to larger premises at 11 Dudley Road, where the firm stayed in operation until his death in 1980. A memorial plaque marks the building, which is still in existence.

== History of notable properties ==
=== Eden Park ===
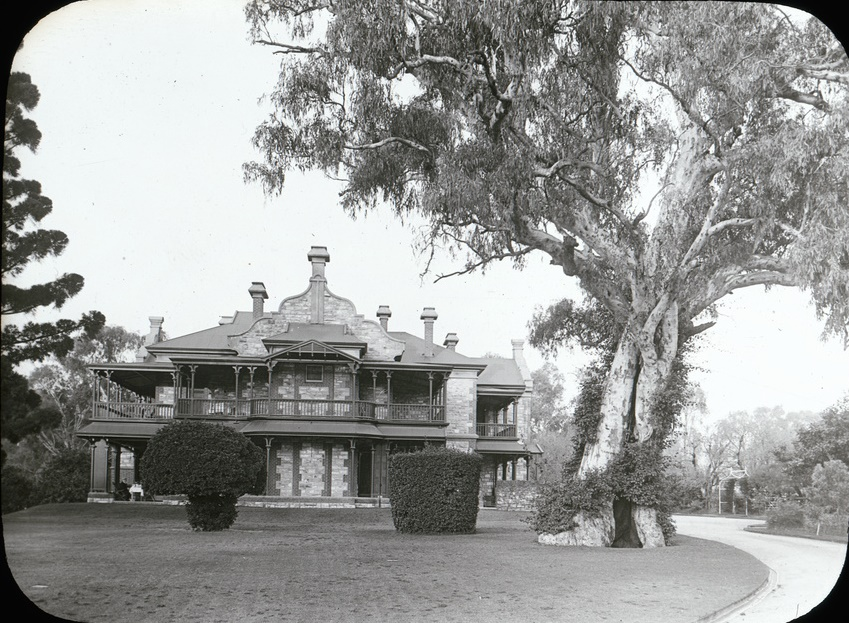
"Eden Park" c.1925.

Brunskill built the first home for the family shortly after arrival in 1839, on land later owned by Sir Edwin Smith, on the site of the present Loreto College, then another cottage on the present Dudley Road, and finally the most elaborate of all, a house which they called Sandford, on the site of the current Eden Park. A huge Norfolk pine planted by the Brunskills still stands. Brunskill ran a brick-making business and grew crops such as wheat and kept cattle, while Sarah tended to pigs. He was a businessman in the city. The Brunskills sold up when they moved to the Barossa Valley in 1857, when they also subdivided and sold more land to the church.

Sandford passed through several hands before being purchased in 1899 by Thomas Roger Scarfe, brother of George, one of the founding members of the Harris Scarfe department store. Thomas was also a member of the firm. He found the two-storey home unsuitable for his needs and built the grand Victorian mansion now known as Eden Park, designed by architect Alfred Wells. Thomas lived there until his death in 1915, with his widow staying on until her death in 1942.

The house, garden and about 20 acres (8.1 ha) of land were bought by the state government, after which it was used as a residential home and then a school for nurses (Gleneden School of Nursing), before becoming SA Health's conference centre. In 1993 it was acquired by Marryatville High School and since then has been used as a campus for final year students.

=== The Acacias ===
The large house on the corner of present-day Portrush and Kensington Roads (and now part of Loreto College), known as The Acacias, was built in 1874-5 by Dr J. M. Gunson to the design of builder and architect Michael McMullen. The land was originally part of land grant to George Fife Angas, Henry Kingscote, and Thomas Smith, all founding directors of the South Australian Company. After several other owners, Gunson purchased the land in August 1874, built the house on a terrace above First Creek and developed the gardens.

Gunson sold the house to Sir Edwin Smith in 1878, who greatly extended the home, including a verandah and balcony imported from Glasgow and a large ballroom, to the designs of architect Thomas English (who also designed the new premises of Kent Town Brewery in 1876 for Smith). The building, built as a residence in Victorian Italianate style, is heritage-listed on the South Australian Heritage Register. The largely original 1880s decorated interior includes hand-painted motifs, gilding, and faux wood grain detailing.

In December 1920 Loreto Convent bought the house on 5.25 acres (2.12 ha), opening at that location in February 1921. The home was originally used as a dining room for boarders at the school. Further conversions have been undertaken by the school over time, (Note: See Loreto College article for further details of school use of the building.) and the building has been more recently used as the school's boardroom.

In January 2026 the school announced plans to restore the building, led by South Australian heritage artist Marisha Matthews, who teaches art at the school. Architects Woods Bagot are responsible for developing the plans.

=== Hackett's Nursery ===
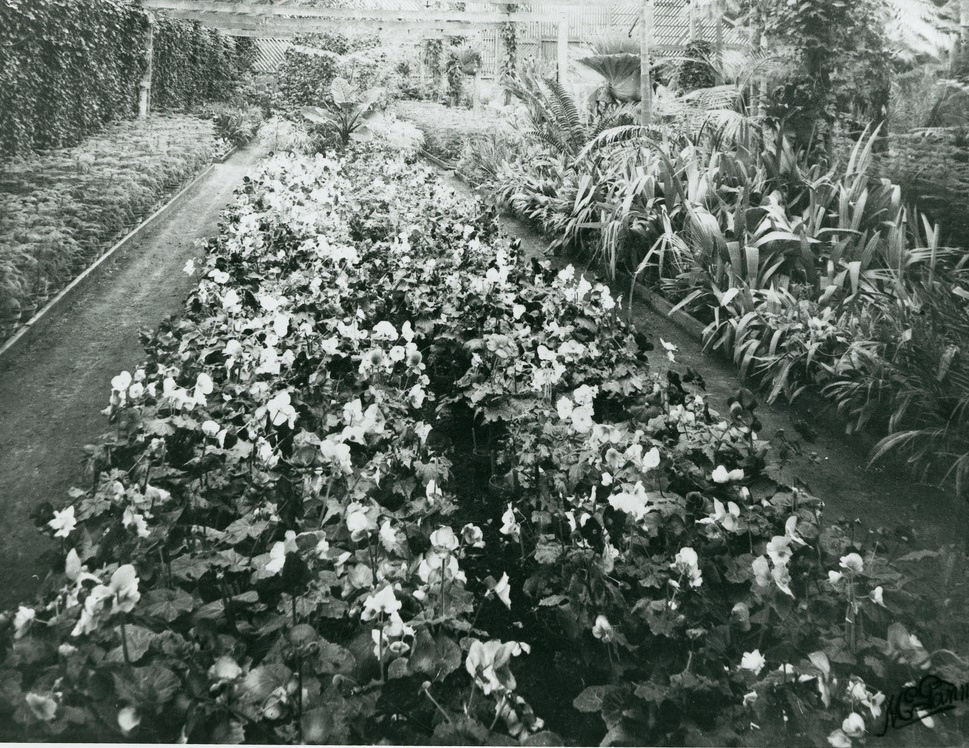
Hackett's Nursery, shadehouse, c.1900

The smallest street, now Hackett Terrace, was formerly named Sun Street, the name deriving from Hackett's Nursery, a family concern created by brothers Elisha and Walter Hackett in the 1850s. Elisha Hackett cultivated the garden of his house in Sydenham Road, creating the nursery, and in 1854 persuaded his brother Walter, who had gone to Victoria in 1851, to join him in business. Walter, after his marriage, built a house in Marryatville designed by architect George Abbott in about 1866. The plot was bought from Brunskill, and was described as a long strip of land, formerly part of a paddock used as a shortcut by Burnside people going to St Matthew's Church. There were several wells, and the property had to be locked against bushrangers, who were active in the area. Walter first planted fruit trees, but as the nursery grew, the fruit trees were removed. More than 100,000 roses as well as shrubs and trees were grown and sold; there were also glasshouses to house begonias, maiden-hair ferns and other house plants, and a shadehouse for palms, tree ferns and staghorns. Native plants were cultivated with care. Walter's sons, first John and then William, lived in the house after their father moved to Brighton, but Walter travelled up each day to work in the nursery until his death in 1914.

In 1917 the nursery was sold to a limited company, E. & W. Hackett Limited, with William continuing as director for three years. In the same year the business bought a 6-acre (2.4 ha) plot in the Millswood Estate for over £20,067 to accommodate the nursery, which drew glowing praise in a 1923 newspaper article and continued to do business there until 1952.

== Schools ==
Marryatville High School, on Kensington Road in Marryatville, notable for its music program, is located within the suburb. The school was formerly Norwood Boys Technical School until it was renamed and opened to both sexes in 1976. Eden Park, the grand two-storey Victorian house built by the Scarfe family, is now used as the high school's Year 12 campus; the timber stables, have been converted into a music centre.

In 2005, Marryatville's Performing Arts Centre, The Forge, was opened. It serves as a performance area for year 11 and 12 Drama Productions and is also used by outside theatre groups. The film Hey Hey It's Esther Blueburger (2008) included several scenes filmed at the school.

Loreto College is an independent Roman Catholic primary and secondary day and boarding school for girls, situated on the corner of Portrush Road and Kensington Road in Marryatville.

The local state primary school, Marryatville Primary School, is actually located in the adjacent suburb Kensington.

== Business precinct ==
There is a business precinct commonly known as Marryatville shops, or Marryatville/Kensington Park precinct, which straddles four suburbs, near the junction of Kensington Road and Tusmore Avenue in Leabrook.

The enclosed Marryatville Shopping Centre is located on the corner of Kensington Road and Tusmore Avenue. The shopping centre was first developed for BI-LO supermarket in 1980–1981, this being demolished and rebuilt redeveloped in 2005–06. As of June 2019 It includes a Woolworths supermarket, newsagency, butchery, liquor store, Bakers Delight bakery, yogurt shop, pharmacy, dine-in café, and Asian food take-away shop.

Along Kensington Road in Marryatville, there is a petrol station and other businesses. Over the road in Kensington there is the Marryatville Hotel, and a little east of this, there are other shops, the Kensington Park post office, and the heritage-listed Regal Theatre, built in 1925 and later extensively refurbished in 1940–41 art deco style, to designs by noted architect Frank Kenneth Milne.

On the south side of Kensington Road in Leabrook is the heritage-listed building built in 1883 as the original Marryatville Primary School, now housing a large health centre and restaurant (formerly Spice Kitchen, later bought by Marryatville Pizza Pan).
