= Burnside, South Australia =

Burnside
- Suburb
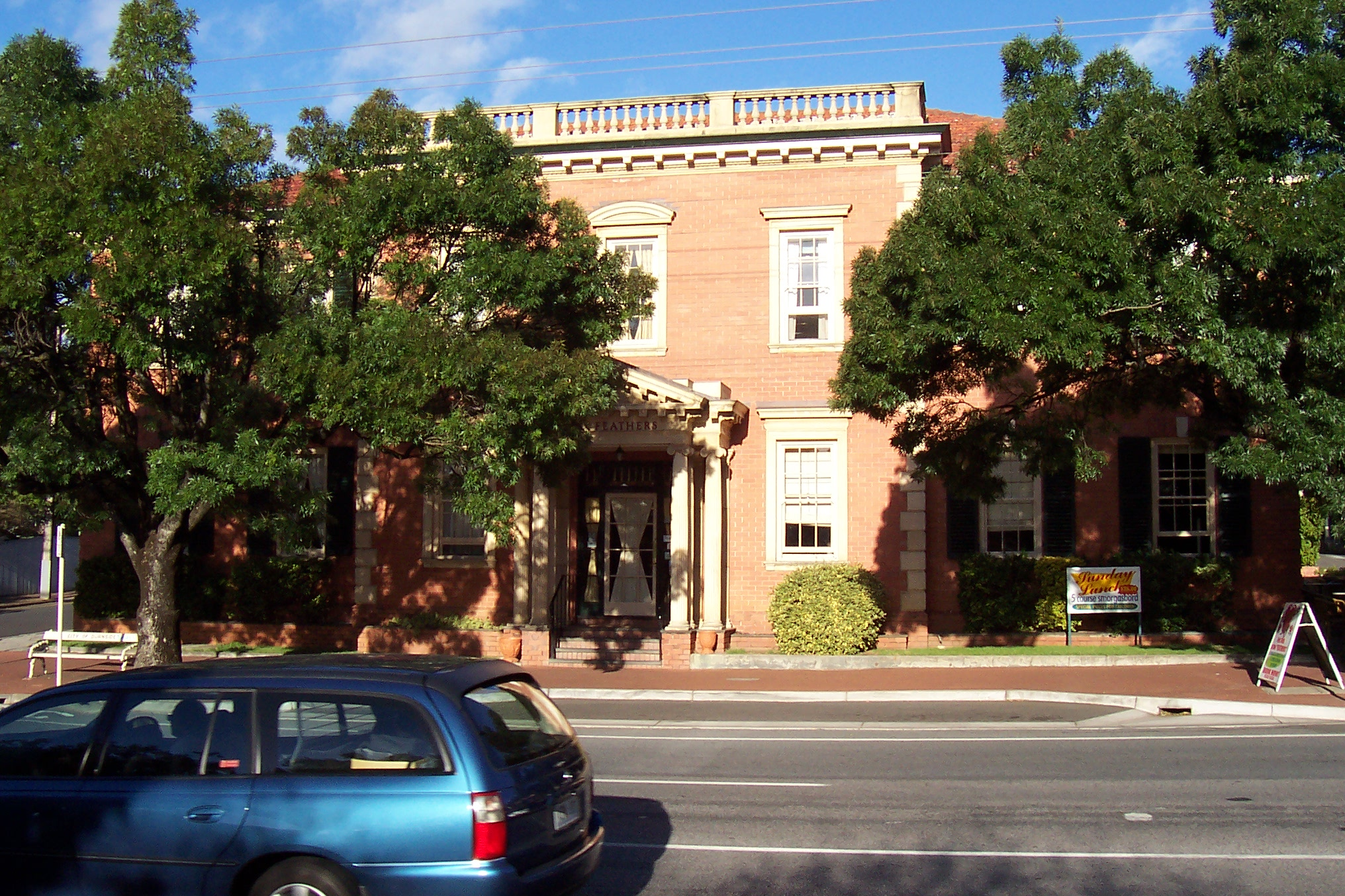
- The Feathers Hotel and Pub

- Country: Australia
- State: South Australia
- City: Adelaide
- LGA: City of Burnside

Population
  - Total: 3,060 (SAL 2021)
- Postcode: 5066
Suburbs around Burnside
Leabrook	Erindale	Wattle Park
Hazelwood	Burnside	Stonyfell
Beaumont	Waterfall Gully	Greenhill

Burnside is suburb in the City of Burnside council area in the eastern suburbs of Adelaide. It is primarily a residential suburb. Burnside is 7.5 kilometres (4.7 mi) east of the Adelaide city centre by road.

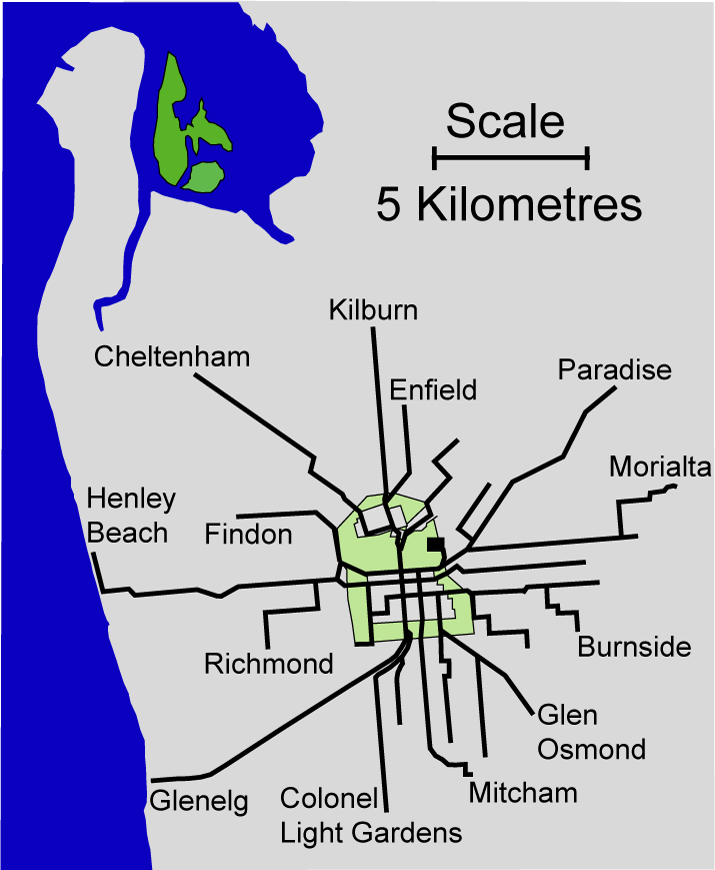
trams used to travel to Burnside and terminate there

== History ==
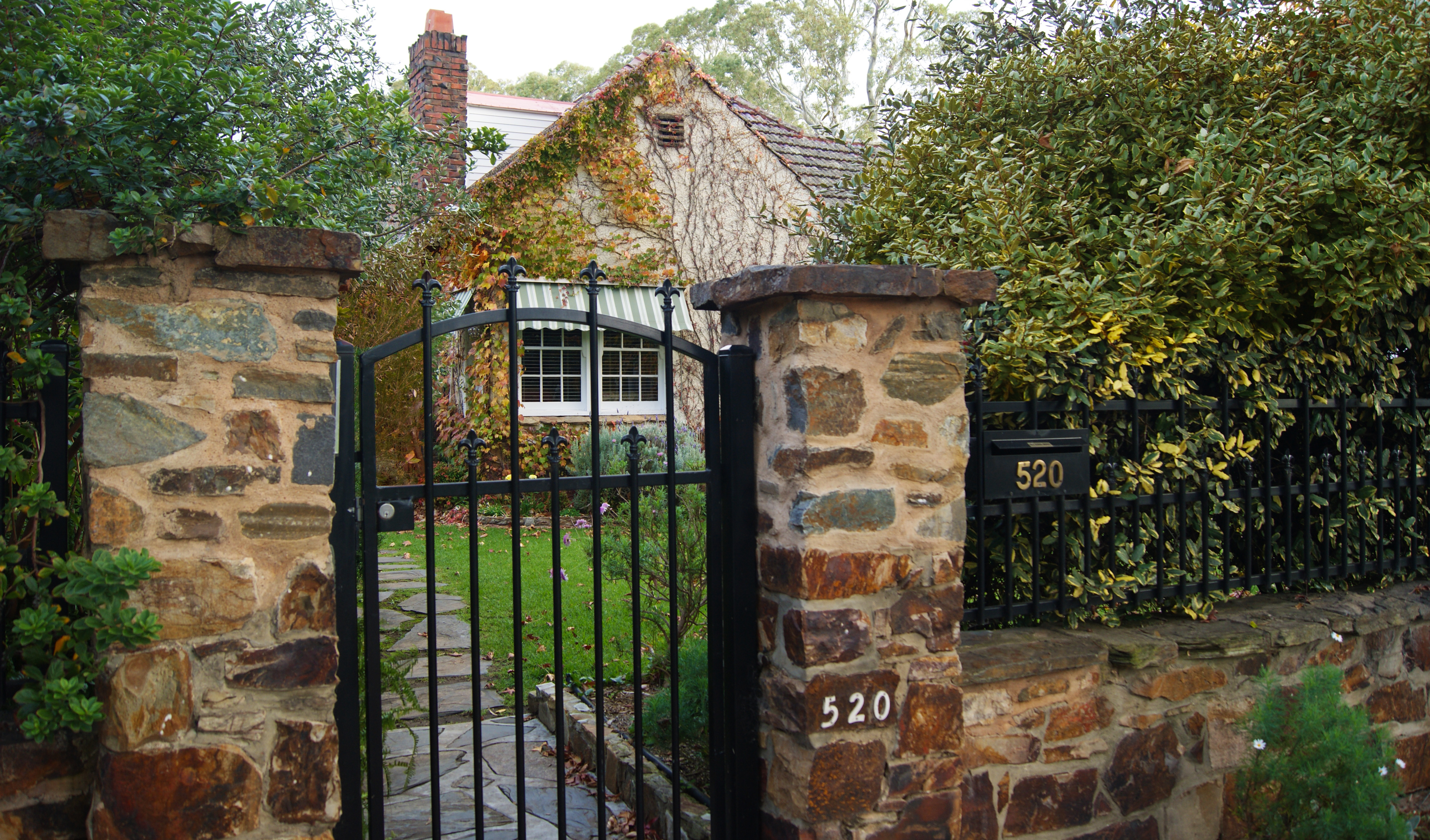
Home in Burnside

Burnside was established and named by Peter Anderson and his family who emigrated from Scotland in 1839. Anderson started a large farm on leased land near Second Creek. The farm had a large number of animals including pigs, poultry and cattle as well as barley and wheat crops. In 1848, the lease was assigned to William Randall who arranged for the town to be laid out around Second Creek.

It was named Burnside, an amalgamation of the Scottish word for creek, "burn" and "side" because of the original property's location on the side of Second Creek.

Burnside Post Office opened on 21 July 1863, and by the 1870s the area had developed into a small village.

== Facilities ==
There are a number of parks, but most noticeably bordering several that are shared with other suburbs. The Burnside Swimming Centre is located in nearby Hazelwood Park. Langman Reserve is part of both Burnside and Waterfall Gully and the large Newland Park has several ovals.

The Feathers Hotel, a Georgian style pub, is located within the suburb.

Burnside Primary School is a state government school.

A number of churches of various denominations, including Baptist, Lutheran, and Anglican, also call the suburb home. St David's Anglican Church occupies a prominent position at 484-494 Glynburn Road. The Catholic Church in the suburb is dedicated to St. John Vianney.

== Population ==
As of the 2021 Census, there were 3,060 people in Burnside in 1,257 households, with a median age of 43. 48.2% of people were male. 57.4% were married. 66.0% were born in Australia, with the next most common countries of birth being England (5.2%) and China (5.2%). 73.6% of people only spoke English at home. Other languages spoken at home included Mandarin at 7.1% and Arabic at 2.5%. The most common religions were No Religion at 41.3%, Catholic at 16.5% and Anglican at 11.3%.

62.7% of people were employed, 54.1% of whom are employed full-time. 6.8% of employed people worked in non-psychiatric hospitals. The majority of respondents did not report any long-term health conditions. 3.4% of residents served in the Australian Defense Force at some point prior to the census. The median weekly household income is A$2,257.

== Notable residents ==
- George Aiston (1879–1943), policeman and ethnographer
- Dorrit Black (1891–1951), artist
- Jimmy Melrose (1913–1936), aviator
- Christopher Pyne (born 1967), former federal Liberal MP and cabinet minister and alumnus of Burnside Primary School
- Sydney Talbot Smith (1861–1948), solicitor, freelance journalist and civic worker

== See also ==
- List of Adelaide suburbs
