= Leabrook, South Australia =

Leabrook
- Suburb
- Country: Australia
- State: South Australia
- City: Adelaide
- LGA: City of Burnside
- Location: 5 km (3.1 mi) E of Adelaide city centre

Government
  - State electorate: Bragg
  - Federal division: Sturt

Population
  - Total: 1,605 (SAL 2021)
- Postcode: 5068
Suburbs around Leabrook
Kensington	Kensington Park	Kensington Gardens
Marryatville, Heathpool	Leabrook	Erindale
Tusmore	Hazelwood Park	Burnside

Leabrook is a suburb of Adelaide, South Australia in the City of Burnside.

It is a primarily residential suburb in eastern Adelaide, and was the site of Coopers Brewery, until its relocation to Regency Park, South Australia.

Most of the suburb previously known as Knightsbridge now lies within Leabrook.
