= Heathpool, South Australia =

Heathpool
- Suburb
- Interactive map of Heathpool
- Country: Australia
- State: South Australia
- City: Adelaide
- LGA: City of Norwood Payneham St Peters

Government
  - State electorate: Bragg
  - Federal division: Sturt

Area
  - Total: 0.2 km^{2} (0.077 sq mi)

Population
  - Total: 596 (SAL 2021)
- Postcode: 5068
Suburbs around Heathpool
	Marryatville
Toorak Gardens	Heathpool	Leabrook
	Tusmore

Heathpool is a residential suburb of Adelaide, Australia, east of the city, in the City of Norwood Payneham St Peters.

== History ==
It was one of three large properties in the Marryatville area, and named by early settler George Reed, after his home in Hethpool, Northumberland.

The house at 11 Northumberland Avenue was owned by Henry Woodhouse Crompton for many years.
