= Hazelwood Park, Adelaide =

Park in South Australia, Australia

Hazelwood Park
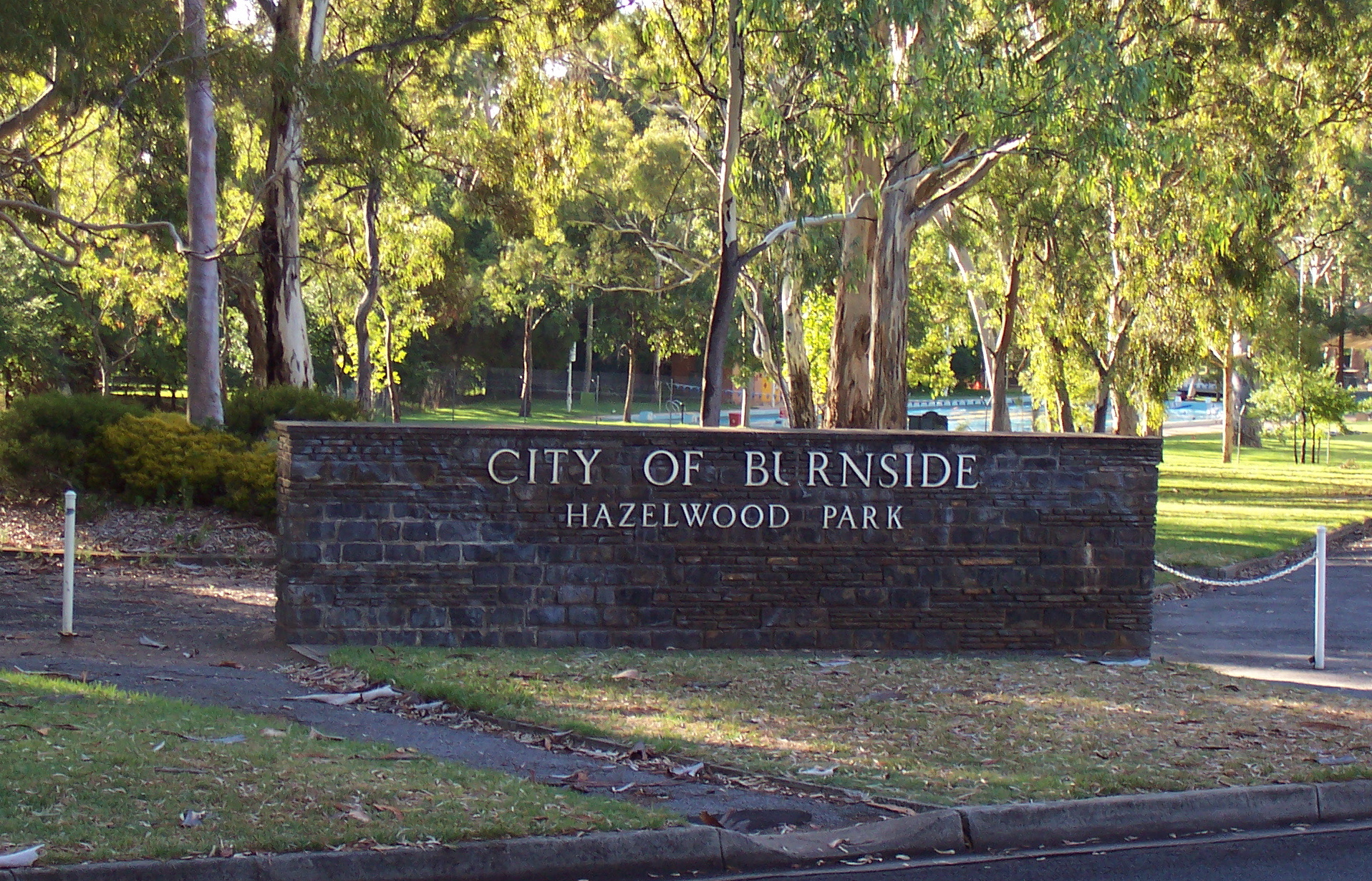
- Sign heralding Hazelwood Park from Greenhill Road

- Location within South Australia
- Location: Hazelwood Park, South Australia
- Coordinates: 34°56′17″S 138°39′20″E
- Created: 15 July 1915
- Operator: City of Burnside
- Website: https://www.burnside.sa.gov.au/Parks/Hazelwood-Park

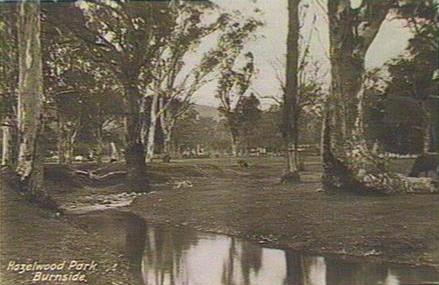
First Creek running through Hazelwood Park, 1920.

Hazelwood Park is a park in the Australian state of South Australia located in the suburb of Hazelwood Park within the Adelaide Metropolitan Area.

First creek continues its journey from the hills through the park, the water flowing from Waterfall Gully and into Tusmore. The park contains an assortment of play areas, picnic tables and barbecues. It is relatively large by suburban standards, but unusually there are no playing fields. It is strongly characterised by massive old eucalyptus trees that can be seen from blocks away. Although it is well facilitated, it is normally not as popular as the nearby smaller Tusmore Park.

Hazelwood Park was listed on the South Australian Heritage Register on 11 May 1995.

== George Bolton Swimming Centre ==

The park also contains the George Bolton Swimming Centre, sometimes referred to as the Burnside Swimming Centre, or just Burnside Pool, comprising an outdoor 50 metres (160 ft) lap pool, a 25 metres (82 ft) children's pool and a wading pool. There is also a sauna and steam room, two playgrounds and a kiosk. The facility is only open in the summer months, and is very popular on hot days in Adelaide (greater than 32 °C) when it is open until late in the evening.

=== History ===
The Burnside Swimming Centre is a large swimming complex in the park, opened in 1966. The swimming centre was a pet project of then-Mayor George Bolton; he had a grand vision of what he wanted Hazelwood Park to become. Bolton met unprecedented public opposition in 1964 when the idea was first unveiled. The substantial elderly population of Burnside (15%) was wholly opposed to the idea, suggesting the influx of troublemakers and noise was hardly worth the effort. The cost was estimated at £75,000. While architects were resigning over the scale of the proposed development and a number of residents were up in arms, the Adelaide newspapers had a ball; cartoonists spent many of their daily cartoons covering the debacle. With the failure of a poll to decide the fate of the idea on 24 March 1964, the Sunday Mail proclaimed the headline "Burnside Says NO to Swim Pool". Mayor Bolton was not dismayed by the result; he pushed further ahead with his idea, announcing new plans in December 1964. After a strong PR campaign and minor changes to the project, a poll in February 1965 voted strongly in favour of the idea. The Mayor had won his battle and it was named the George Bolton Swimming Centre in his honour upon opening in 1966.

== Gallery ==
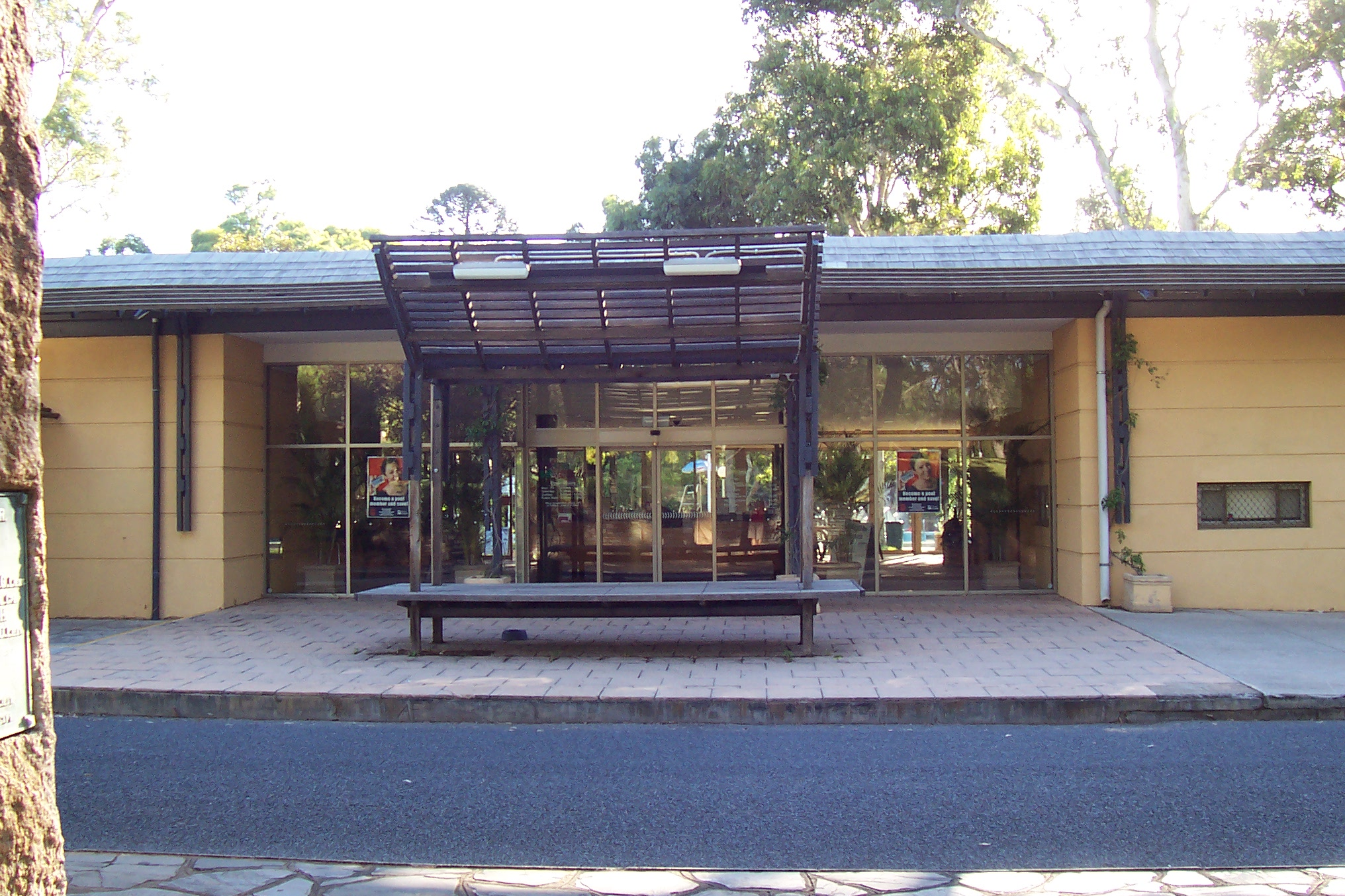
Front door

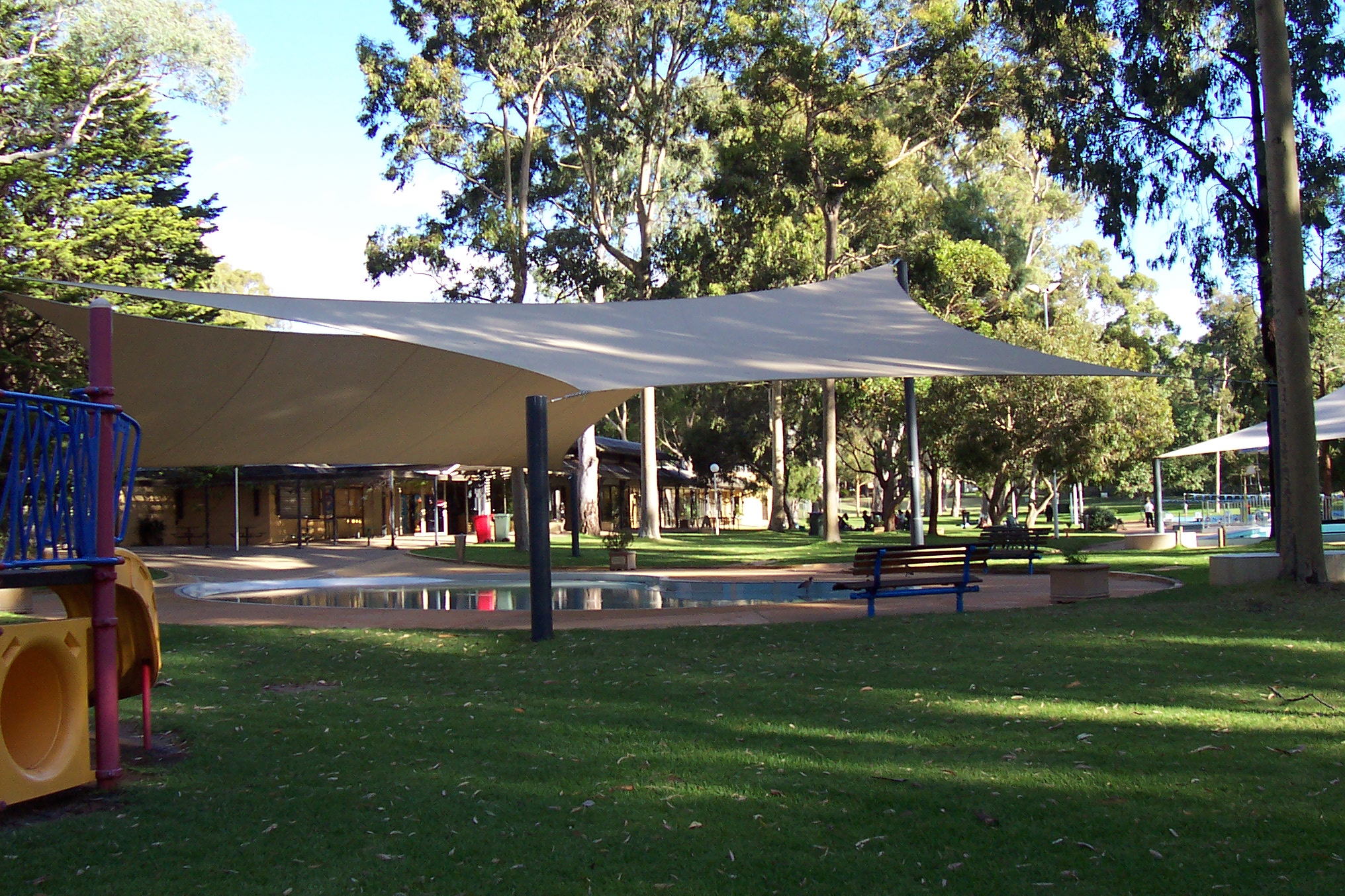
The smallest of the three pools

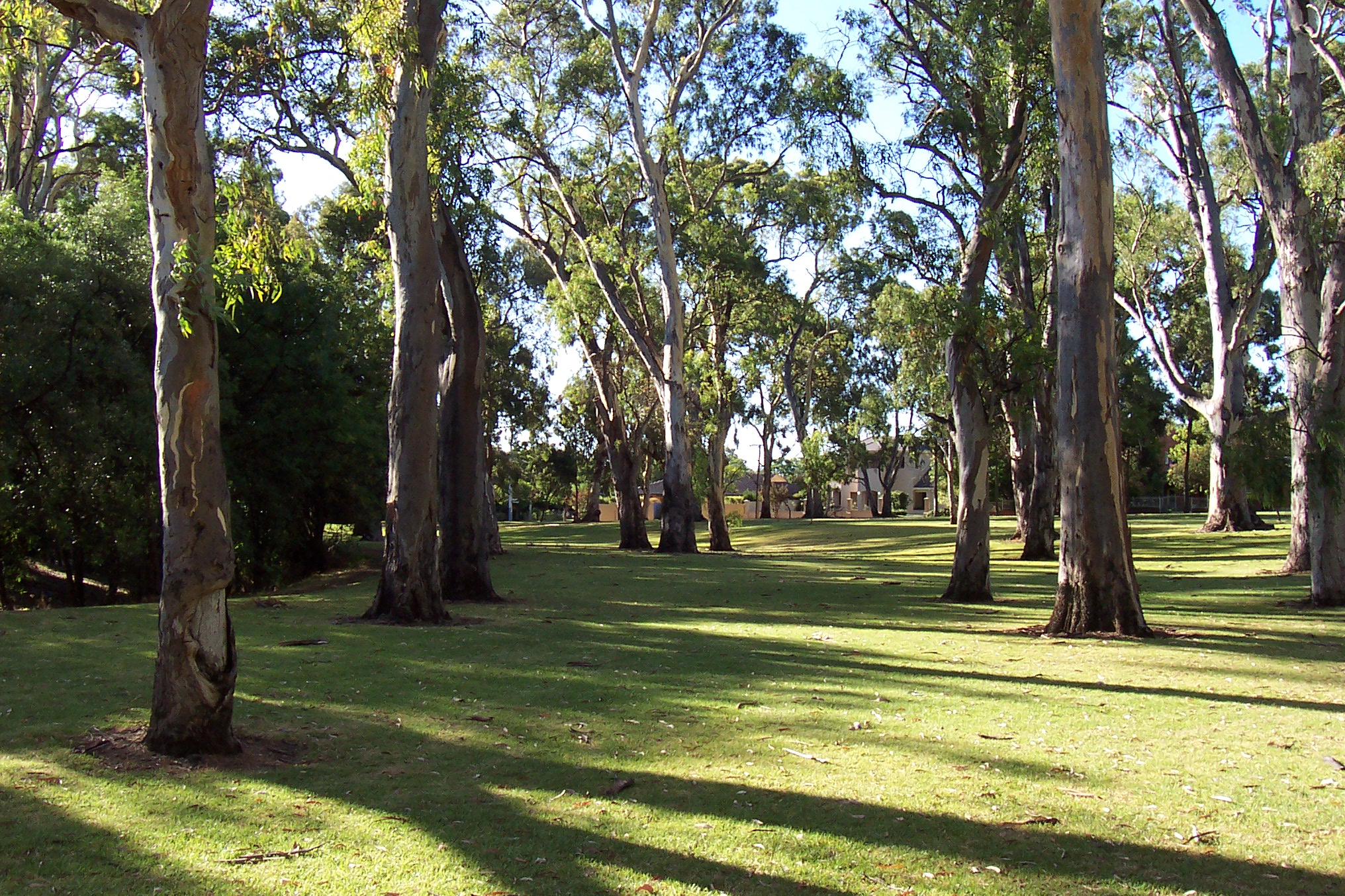
Open space and green grass at the park

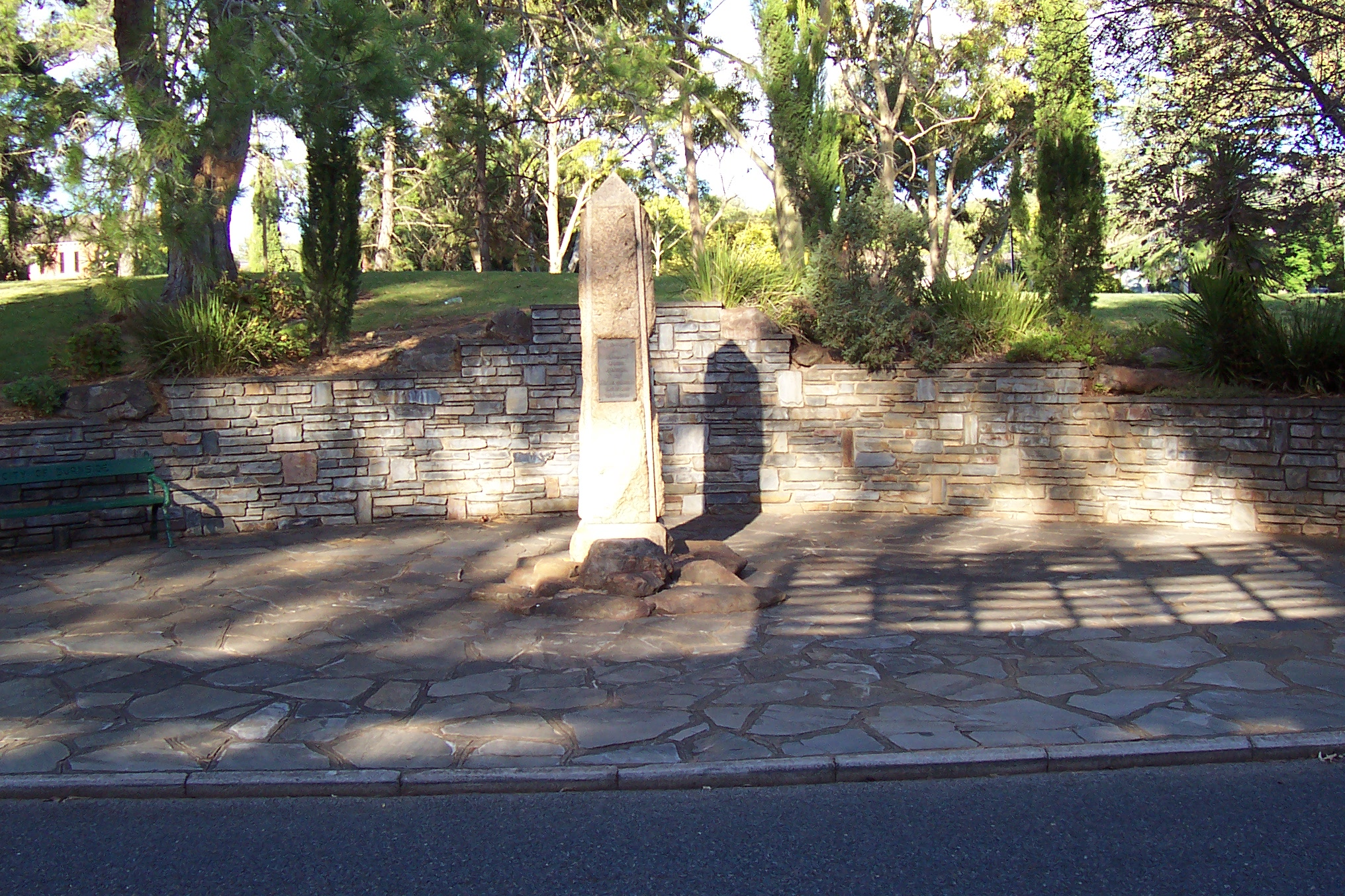
WWI memorial obelisk

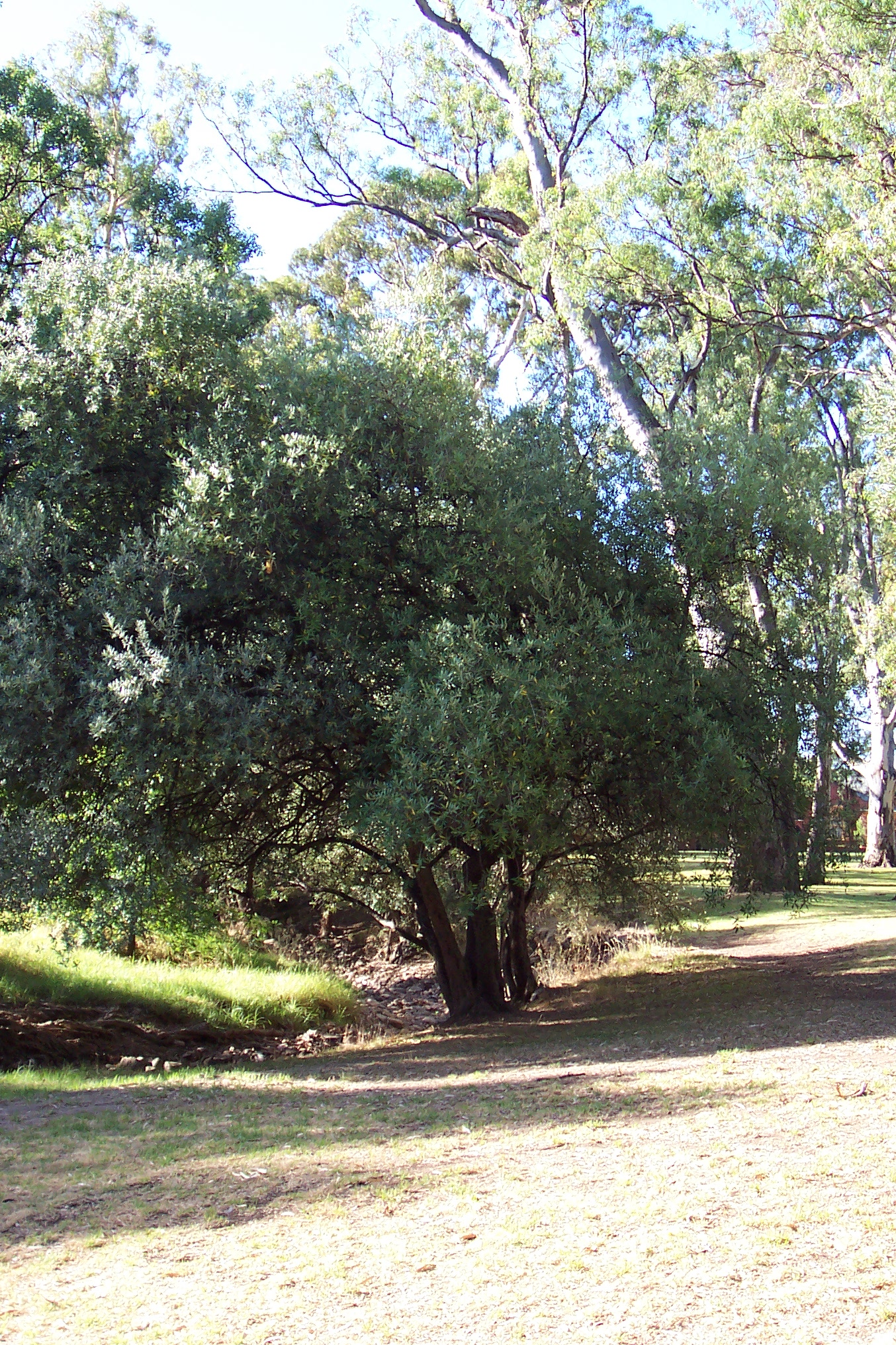
Olive trees in the park

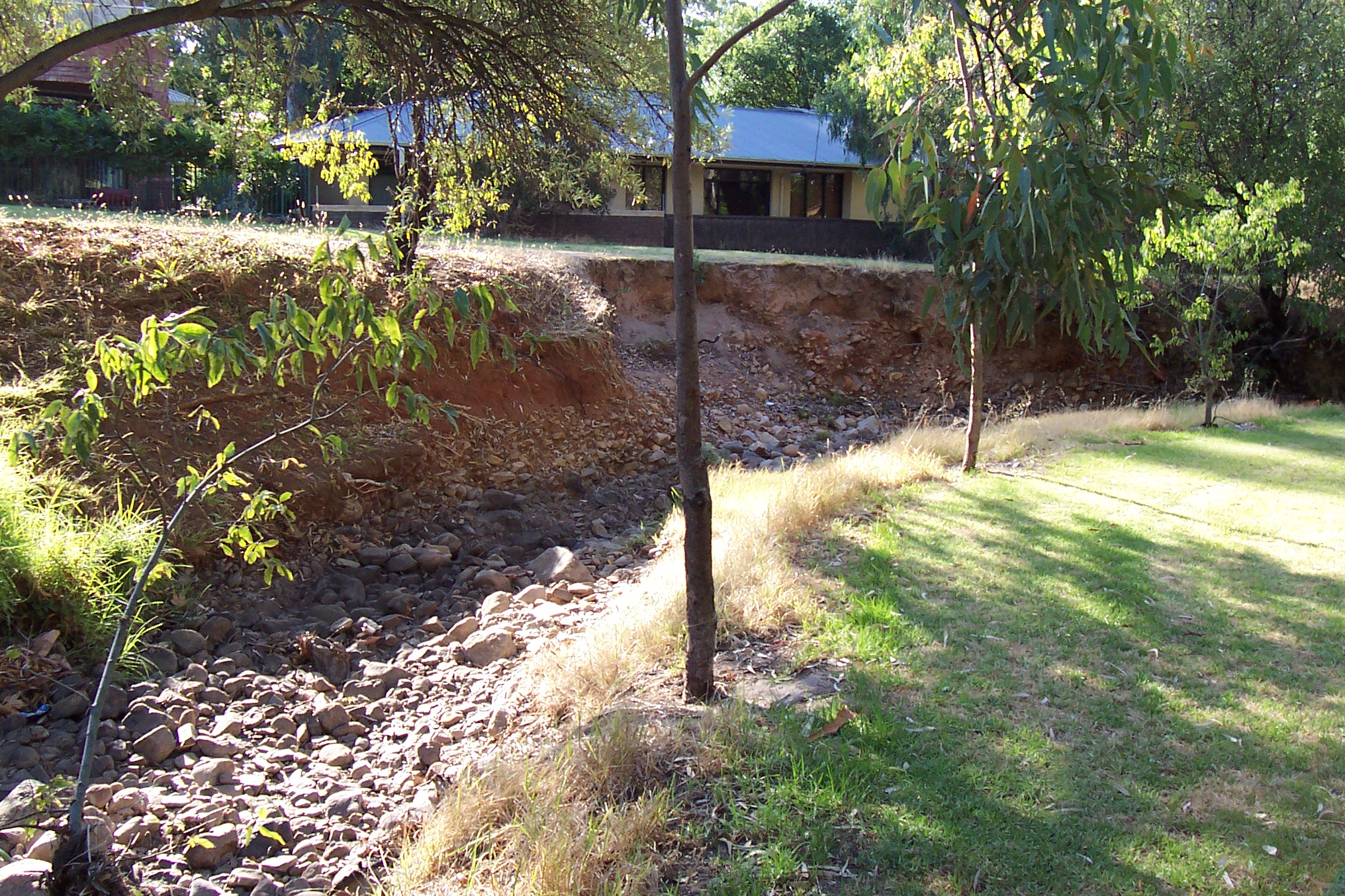
First creek in summer

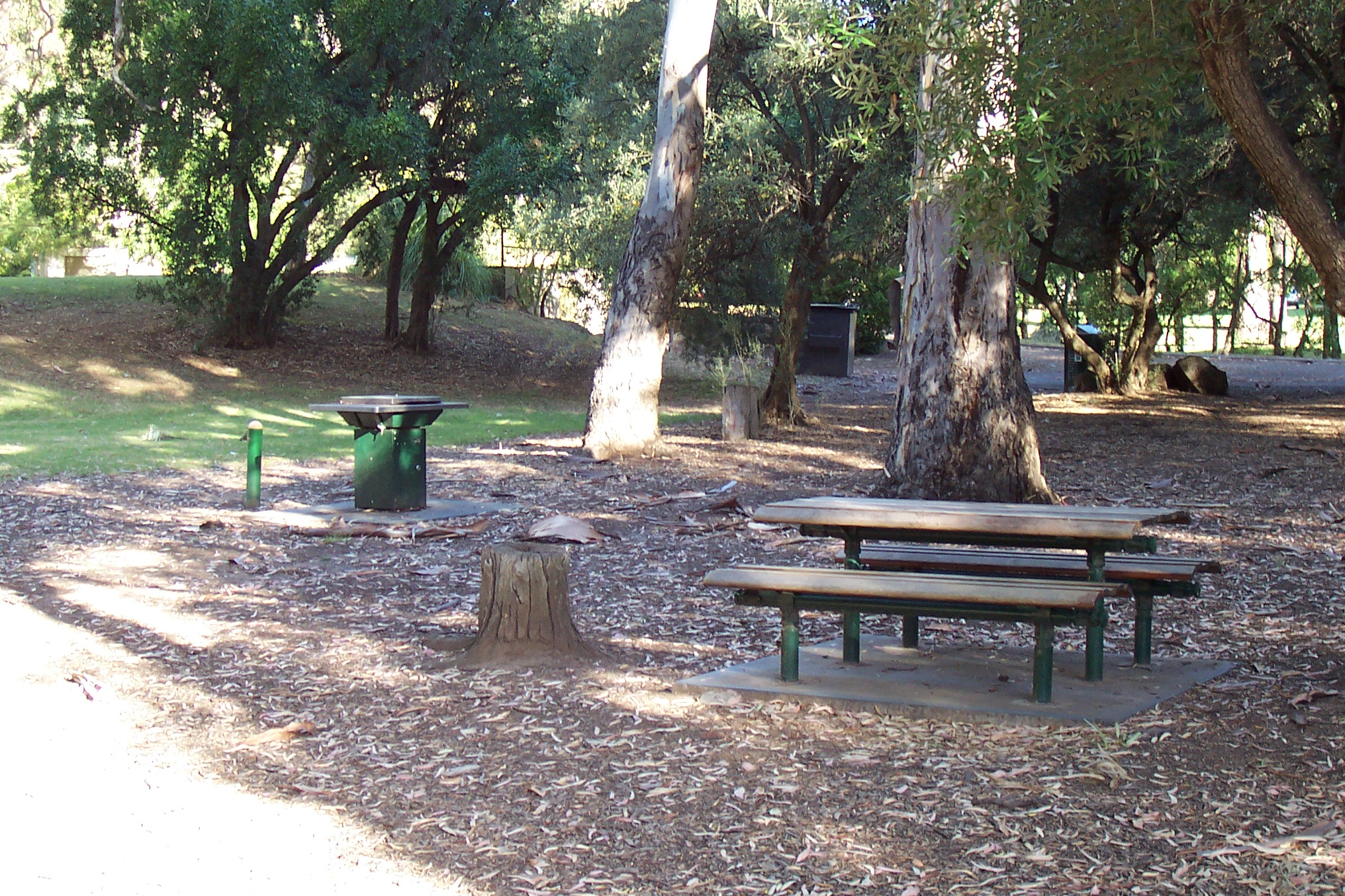
Barbecue and picnic bench for free use

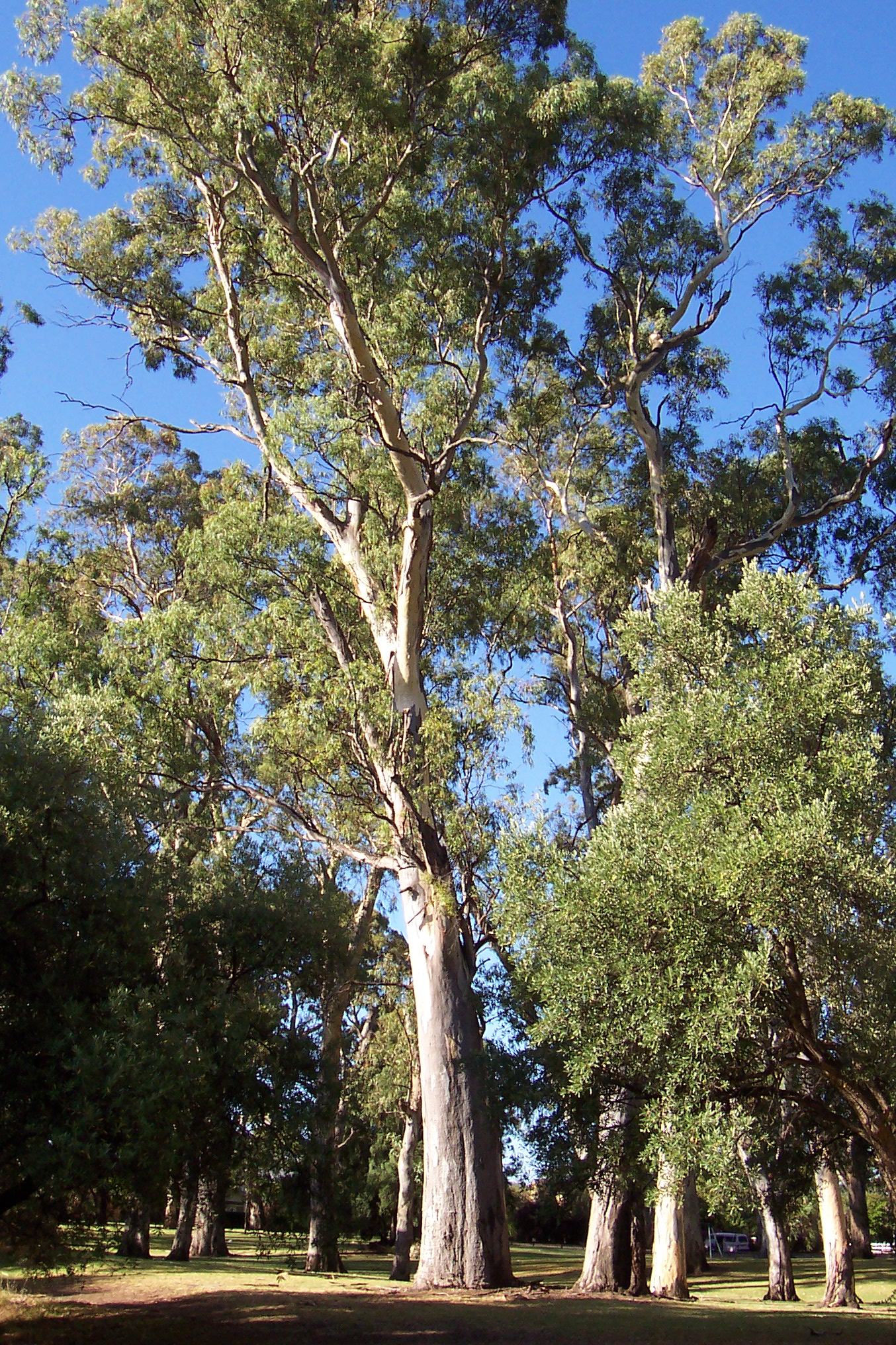
Gum trees in the park

== See also ==
- List of Adelaide parks and gardens
