= Kensington, South Australia =

Kensington
- Suburb
- Interactive map of Kensington
- Country: Australia
- State: South Australia
- City: Adelaide
- LGA: City of Norwood Payneham St Peters
- Location: 5 km (3.1 mi) east of Adelaide

Government
  - State electorate: Dunstan
  - Federal division: Sturt

Area
  - Total: 0.5 km^{2} (0.19 sq mi)

Population
  - Total: 1,808 (SAL 2021)
- Postcode: 5068
Suburbs around Kensington
| Norwood | Beulah Park | Kensington Park |
| Norwood | Kensington | Kensington Park |
| Toorak Gardens | Marryatville | Leabrook |

Kensington is a suburb of Adelaide, South Australia in the City of Norwood, Payneham & St Peters council area. Unlike the rest of the city, Kensington's streets are laid out diagonally. Second Creek runs through and under part of the suburb, which contains many heritage buildings as well as Norwood Swimming Centre and several schools.

== History ==
The stretch of Portrush Road alongside Kensington was originally known as Kensington Terrace. The village of Kensington was surveyed in November 1838 by J.H. Hughes, the first in the immediate area, and was named after Kensington Palace. The streets were laid out diagonally in order to minimise crossings of Second Creek, with the main streets, High Street and Regent Street, running parallel to the creek.

Wellington and Bridge Streets, in the south-western corner of the suburb, were first to be settled, and Bridge Street was the main street until a tramline was laid along High Street in the 1870s. The first dwelling in Kensington was built in Wellington Street by a Mr Thorpe for J. Marshall. John Roberts and other builders were responsible for building many brick residences after the 1840s.

The first public house, named the Kensington Arms, was built by Dr Henry Scott on the site of the present Kensington Hotel, at the corner of Thornton and Regent Streets, in a mud hut. No. 17 Wellington Street was built as a pub, the Freemason's Arms, in the 1840s, but closed after the first Robin Hood Hotel opened in 1845, and sold to Mortimer Burman. Scotland-born builder and artist James Shaw (1815–1881) lodged with Burman in 1859, and the two travelled down the coast to see the wreck of the Admella. (Note: Shaw produced two paintings of the ship, which are held in the Art Gallery of South Australia.) In the 1930s, the building was converted into two dwellings.

The Kensington line was the first of several trams in Adelaide, firstly horse-drawn (1878) and later electrified. The Adelaide & Suburban Tramway Company built and ran a horse-drawn tramway from Kensington to the Adelaide city centre, comprising double tracks that ran down The Parade. A single loop track ran up Regent Street and back down High Street.

=== Notable early residents ===
Early settler George Brunskill, who arrived in the colony of South Australia with his family in 1839, leased 67 acres (27 ha) from the South Australia Company, built a home which he called "Sandford" (after his birthplace in Westmorland), and cultivated crops in Kensington, later building more homes. By 1853 he owned only 30 acres (12 ha), and sold his property in 1858.

First Anglican bishop Augustus Short first lived in Kensington after his arrival in December 1847, on the corner of Bishop's Place and Regent Street.

The Colonial Secretary, then Alfred Mundy, lived in Kensington in 1848. This was before the village of Marryatville was developed over the road to the south.

Lavington Glyde, member of the Legislative Council, lived first on Kensington Terrace and later at the corner of Kensington Road and High Street.

A Catholic nun, now a saint, Mary MacKillop lived and worked in Kensington from 1872 until 1883, establishing the Sisters of St Joseph of the Sacred Heart Congregation. The Mary MacKillop Precinct is located site, and includes a museum, a conference centre, and St Joseph's Chapel. Mary MacKillop College is also within the precinct.

Surveyor Stephen King died at his home "calta Wurlie" on Kensington Terrace, Kensington, in October 1915, having retired there in 1912.

== Historic buildings ==
The suburb contains a large number of heritage-listed buildings, mostly dwellings and a few former shops. The Norwood Swimming Pool is also listed.

=== The Rising Sun ===
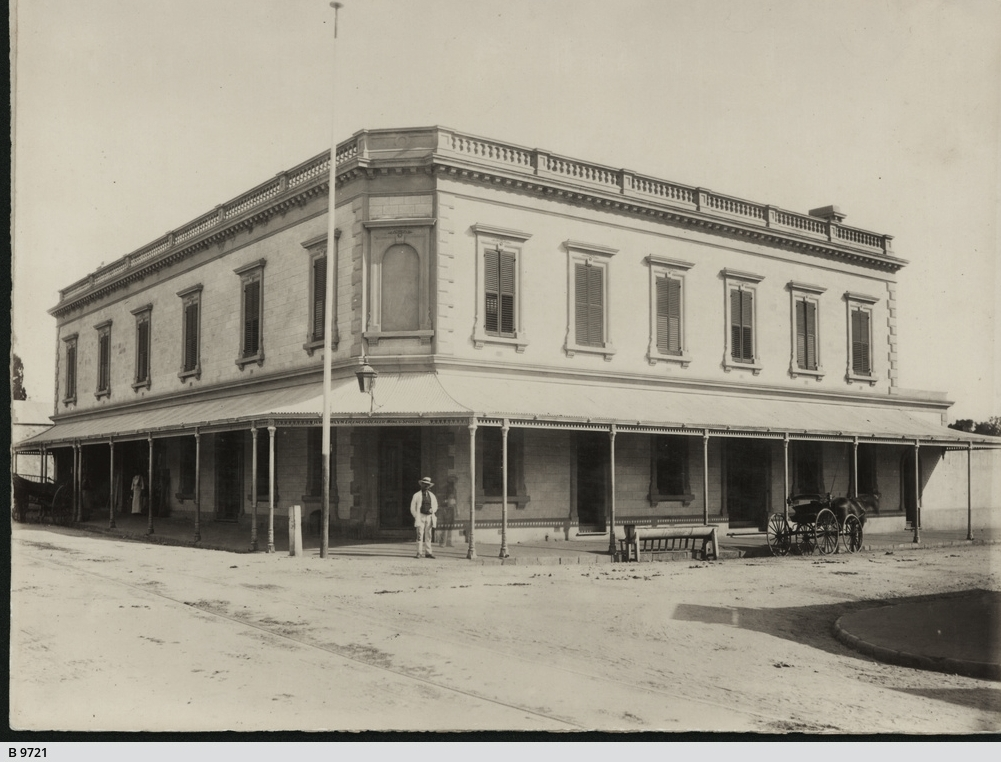
Building housing the Rising Sun Hotel 1882–1909

The Rising Sun Hotel was established in 1846 by William Beck, a "black African" man who had previously run the Kensington Arms; the hotel was later referred to as "Black Becks". The inn occupied the premises at 64 Bridge Street from 1848 to 1882, during which the Beck family was associated with it for its first two decades; Sarah Ann Beck and then Alexander Beck held the licence following William's death. In 1858 the inn was described as "a public house of brick, 7 rooms, bar, kitchen, stables, sheds and garden"; by 1864 it included a cellar. Edwin T. Smith, proprietor of Kent Town Brewery, bought the inn, and Benjamin Morey, who served as local councillor in 1863–64, held the licence until October 1878. Smith improved the building, adding an enclosed area at the front and fitting the interior with cedar woodwork. After Morey came William Hamlin Fairley and John Paul Dunk in 1879, followed by Henry White Newlyn in 1880.

Newlyn moved the inn to a new two-storey building on the corner of High Street in 1882, which remained as the Rising Sun Hotel until 1909, although he left proprietorship in 1885. Meetings of groups such as ratepayers and Oddfellows, as well as coronial inquests, were held at the hotel in the 1880s.

The old building, owned by Smith until 1913, was converted into three residential tenancies. It was used as a motorcycle factory from 1950 to 1972, manufacturing the only South Australian-produced motorcycles. After that the building lay derelict until it was converted into a boutique pub in 1983. It was heritage-listed on the South Australian Heritage Register as the "Rising Sun Inn" in the same year. The corner building which housed the hotel at the turn of the century was heritage-listed in 1990, as two attached shops and a residence.

The internationally renowned visual effects company, Rising Sun Pictures, took its name from the pub after its founders had their first meeting there in 1995.

In 2015 Grant Goodall took over the establishment from its previous owner of eight years, chef Tom Savis. Today it is known as simply "The Rising Sun".

== Location and governance ==
Kensington lies approximately 5 km (3.1 mi) due east of Adelaide city centre.

Nearby suburbs Kensington Park and Beulah Park are in the City of Burnside, while Norwood and Marryatville are also in Norwood, Payneham and St Peters council area.

== Schools ==
Marryatville Primary School is a state primary school, located in Kensington (not in Marryatville, as its name suggests), accommodating around 545 students from Reception to Year 7 as of 2022. Most students go on to attend Marryatville High School, with some students zoned to Norwood/Morialta High School. The school was established in 1883 at a site on Kensington Road, and moved to its current location in 1978. The first principal was William J. Kent.

Mary MacKillop College is a private Catholic girls' secondary school located in Kensington, founded by Mary MacKillop in 1872.

McKellar Stewart Kindergarten is a preschool on Regent Place.

The junior primary campus of St Joseph's Memorial School, catering for children from preschool to Year 1, is in Bridge Street, Kensington, while its other campus in William Street, Norwood, caters for Year 2 to Year 6.

A middle school STEM building for Pembroke School is located in Kensington, adjacent to the main middle school facilities in Kensington Park. The building was designed by architects Grieve Gillett Anderson and opened in 2019.

== Other amenities ==
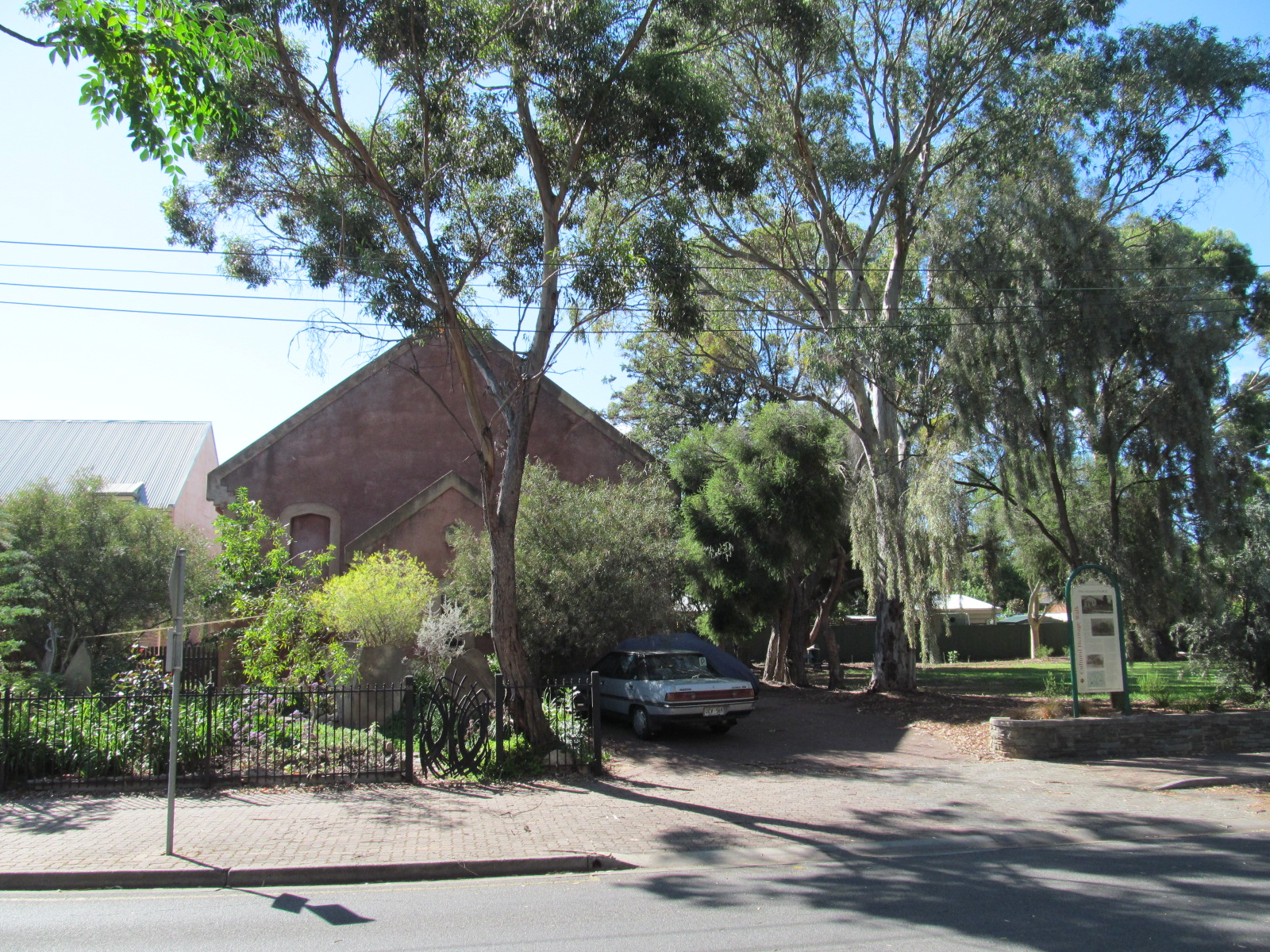
Village Church & Kensington Pioneer Park

=== Parks ===
Borthwick Park has its front entrance on Thornton Street, with two other entrances off Bridge Street and High Street via Heanes Lane. Second Creek runs through the park. Alby South (born c. 1920, who was a member of the KRA for 30 years, and was a Kensington Ward councillor for 10 years, was largely responsible for the creation of the park. It contains a number of large river red gum trees, and has been greatly improved since the 2000s by a revegetation project, undertaken by the Kensington Residents Association (KRA) in association with the council and the Adelaide and Mt Lofty Ranges Natural Resource Management Board. Since 2010, plantings by the volunteer group have helped to establish plants which were native to the area before the colonisation of South Australia, improving biodiversity by establishing new growth under the remnant gums, after removal of invasive kikuyu grass in these areas. Sedges and rushes to help protect banks of Second Creek from further erosion, and a nature play area has been established on one bank.

Kensington Pioneer Park was created on a former church graveyard in Maesbury Street, and was named in honour of the pioneers of the area who were buried in the cemetery between February 1849 to October 1864. It is a small park next to "The Village Church", a former church now converted into a residence. The church was non-denominational, later Congregational. The park was created by the local Apex Club in 1966. There is a large rock with a plaque listing the names of all those buried in the cemetery.

=== Other amenities ===
Norwood Swimming Centre, an outdoor pool owned by the council, is in Phillips Street.

High Street Cafe is next to Mary McKillop School.

Apart from the Rising Sun (mentioned above), there is another pub, the Kensington Hotel, aka "The Kensi", on Regent Street.

== Notable residents ==
Notable residents of Kensington have included:

- Dr John Benson (died July 1877), who lived at 50 High Street and practised in Kensington for ten years, and was much respected
- Arthur Henry Freeling, Surveyor General & Colonial Engineer
- Edward Castres Gwynne, Supreme Court Judge
- Mary MacKillop, Catholic nun and later saint
- Alfred Mundy, Colonial Secretary
- Augustus Short, first Anglican Bishop
- Dr Thomas Taylor, one of the state's first medical practitioners
- Charles Algernon Wilson (died 1884), Commissioner of Inland Revenue from 1858; first Chief Clerk at the Supreme Court from 1876
