= Erindale, South Australia =

Erindale
- Suburb
- Coordinates: 34.928°S 138.662°E
- Country: Australia
- State: South Australia
- City: Adelaide
- LGA: City of Burnside
- Location: 6 km (3.7 mi) from Adelaide

Population
  - Total: 1,172 (SAL 2021)
- Postcode: 5066

Erindale is a suburb of Adelaide in the City of Burnside. It is on the east side of Glynburn Road, where it borders Leabrook.

The suburb came into existence in 1912 by the sub-division of a property formerly belonging to the estate of James Cowan. Cowan purchased the property in 1889 from John Stuart Sanders and renamed it Erindale after his place of birth. The grand residence on the property was founded in 1855 as "The Waldrons" by H. W. de Mole.

== See also ==
- List of cities and towns in South Australia
