= Women's and Children's Hospital (Adelaide) =

Hospital in Adelaide, South Australia

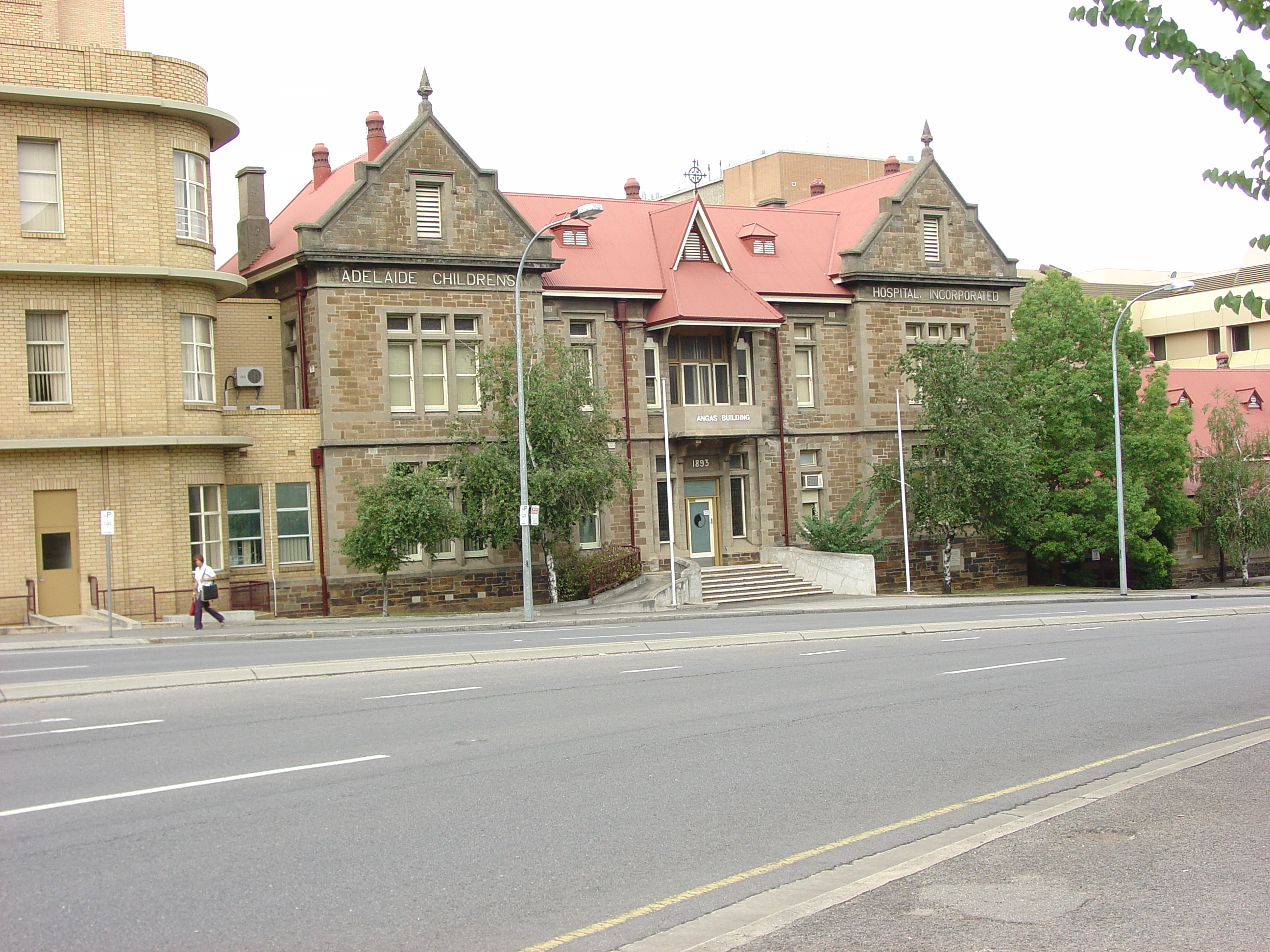
- view of the Angas Building from King William Road

Geography
- Location: 72 King William Rd, North Adelaide, South Australia, Australia
- Coordinates: 34.9114°S 138.5998°E

Organisation
- Care system: Public Medicare (AU)
- Type: Specialist
- Affiliated university: University of Adelaide, University of South Australia and Flinders University

Services
- Emergency department: Yes, Paediatric Emergency and women's health emergency
- Beds: 314
- Speciality: Obstetrics; Paediatrics

History
- Founded: 1876 (Adelaide Children's Hospital); 1902 (Queen Victoria Hospital); March 1989 (merger)

Links
- Website: www.wch.sa.gov.au
- Lists: Hospitals in Australia

The Women's and Children's Hospital (WCH) is a hospital for women and children in Adelaide, South Australia, Australia. It was established in March 1989, when the Queen Victoria Hospital and Adelaide Children's Hospital were amalgamated, initially named Adelaide Medical Centre for Women and Children, being renamed to its present name in 1995.

In September 2022 plans were announced by the Government of South Australia to build a new facility in Park 27, on the site of the Thebarton Police Barracks.

The hospital is part of the Women's and Children's Health Network.

== History ==
=== Adelaide Children's Hospital (1876–1989) ===
The Adelaide Children's Hospital (ACH) was founded in 1876 and officially opened in 1879. Initially funded by a number of wealthy patrons, subscriptions, fund-raising, and government grants, it was first intended only for poor and destitute children.

Architect Alfred Wells designed the Angas Building, the hospital's oldest major building still standing, which opened in 1894. He later designed Allen Campbell Building (opened 1897). Both are now heritage-listed.

The hospital became an incorporated institution in 1880.

ACH ran the Queen Victoria Convalescent Home for Children at Mount Lofty from 1898 until the 1940s, Mareeba Babies' Hospital in Woodville between 1951 and 1960, and it purchased Estcourt House at Tennyson, relinquishing it in 1978. Occasionally children were sent from the hospital to Seaforth Convalescent Home.

=== Queen Victoria Hospital (1902–1989) ===
The Queen Victoria Hospital started out as the Queen's Home in 1902, becoming the Queen Victoria Maternity Hospital in 1939. In 1966, after it had expanded beyond its original role, it was renamed the Queen Victoria Hospital. By 1982, its role was defined as "a specialist teaching hospital in obstetrics, gynaecology, and neonatology, with a specific role to provide normal and high risk obstetric and neonatal care". It was located at 160 Fullarton Road, Rose Park.

The 10,000-square-metre (110,000 sq ft) site, which includes a tower overlooking Victoria Park / Pakapakanthi as well as a heritage-listed building next door, was purchased by the Burnside War Memorial Hospital in late 1996 from Healthscope Ltd, for around A$2.5 million. In 1998 it was sold to private developers Harwood Investments, who had developed plans to convert it into luxury apartments and about 15 courtyard homes. The apartments are known as the Queen Victoria Apartments.

=== Amalgamation (1989) ===
On 15 March 1989 the Queen Victoria Hospital and the Adelaide Children's Hospital were amalgamated, forming an institution initially named the Adelaide Medical Centre for Women and Children. In 1995 it was renamed as the Women's and Children's Hospital (abbreviated as WCH).

== Description ==
The hospital is located on King William Road in North Adelaide, on the site of the former Adelaide Children's Hospital.

It is one of the major hospitals in Adelaide, and is a teaching hospital of the University of Adelaide, the University of South Australia, and Flinders University.

The children's and adolescents' wards cater for all paediatric specialities, while the women's wards cater for antenatal, gynaecology, neonatal, and postnatal disciplines.

The hospital is part of the wider Women's and Children's Health Network, which as of April 2023 includes Aboriginal Health; Child and Adolescent Mental Health Service (CAMHS; includes Helen Mayo House, for women experiencing post-natal depression); Child and Family Health Service (CaFHS; includes Torrens House); Metropolitan Youth Health; Encompass (which works with NDIS); Cedar Health (dealing with family violence); and Yarrow Place Rape and Sexual Assault Service.

The Women's & Children's Hospital Foundation is the primary charity for the hospital, and exists to raise money and invest initiatives that support the care and future health of South Australia's women, babies and children.

=== Wards ===
As of April 2023 the children's wards include:

- Adolescent Ward (Children's)
- Blood Disorders and Cancer
- Campbell Ward
- Cassia Ward
- Day of Surgery Admissions (DOSA)
- Day Surgery Unit
- Kate Hill Ward
- Mallee Ward (Children's)
- Medical Short Stay Ward
- Newland Ward
- Paediatric Intensive Care Unit (PICU)
- PED Emergency Extended Care Unit
- Rose Ward

As of April 2023 the women's wards include:

- Antenatal and Gynaecology Ward
- Delivery Suite
- Queen Victoria Operating Suite (mostly day surgery)
- Neonatal Intensive Care Unit
- Postnatal Unit
- Special Care Baby Unit

=== Emergency ===
The WCH Paediatric Emergency Department is open 24 hours, 7 day a week and is located on the ground floor, with access from Kermode Street, Sir Edwin Smith Avenue and Brougham Place.

The Women's Assessment Service is also a 24/7 service, which provides care for women in labour, experiencing problems during pregnancy or post-birth, as well as those with reproductive and gynaecological problems.

There is also the Child and Adolescent Virtual Urgent Care Service, available 7 days a week from 1.00 pm to 8.30 pm. via phone or computer. This potentially reduces the need to visit the Emergency Department.

== Future plans ==
In September 2021 it was announced that a new hospital would be built next to the Royal Adelaide Hospital, near the River Torrens.

In September 2022 plans were announced by the Government of South Australia to build the new WCH in Park 27, on the site of the Thebarton Police Barracks. The barracks comprise 10 buildings which are state heritage-listed, which would be demolished in order to allow construction ofths hospital, planned for opening around 2030–31. The site covers 20,000 m^{2} (220,000 sq ft). The South Australian Heritage Council, the Australian Institute of Architects, and many others have voiced their concerns about the loss of the historic building. The new WCH (or NWCH) would be 25 per cent larger than the present one.

== See also ==
- List of hospitals in Australia
- List of children's hospitals
