= Attunga =

Attunga may refer to:

- Attunga, Toorak Gardens, a mansion in the Adelaide suburb of Toorak Gardens, South Australia
- Attunga, New South Wales, a small farming community in the New England region
