= RPPS =

RPPS may refer to:

- Retropatellar Pain Syndrome, a knee condition
- Rockcliffe Park Public School
- Rose Park Primary School
- [Roxburgh Park primary school]
