= Kevin McCarthy (cricketer) =

Australian cricketer

Personal information
- Full name: Kevin Joseph McCarthy
- Born: 11 October 1945 (age 81); Rose Park, Adelaide, South Australia
- Batting: Right-handed
- Bowling: Right-arm fast-medium

Domestic team information
- Years: Team
- 1964–65 to 1972–73: South Australia

Career statistics
Competition	FC	List A
Matches	37	5
Runs scored	630	15
Batting average	15.36	7.50
100s/50s	1/0	0/0
Top score	127	7
Balls bowled	6083	292
Wickets	95	9
Bowling average	30.26	19.88
5 wickets in innings	1	0
10 wickets in match	0	–
Best bowling	6/114	3/27
Catches/stumpings	15/–	2/–
- Source: Cricinfo, 11 August 2019

Kevin Joseph McCarthy (born 11 October 1945) is a former cricketer who played first-class cricket for South Australia from 1964–65 to 1972–73.

== Cricket career ==
A strongly-built fast-medium bowler and useful tail-end batsman, McCarthy made his first-class debut for South Australia in the 1964–65 season when he was 19, playing five matches with only moderate success. Playing for Glenelg in the Adelaide competition in 1967–68, he took 73 wickets in 12 matches at an average of 12.9, twice taking nine wickets in an innings. He was awarded the medal for the outstanding player in the competition.

McCarthy returned to the South Australian team in 1968–69, taking 21 wickets at an average of 28.22 and forming an effective opening attack with Eric Freeman in South Australia's Sheffield Shield-winning team. Early in the season, in the match against the touring West Indians, he scored 127, having gone to the crease with the score at 7 for 166, adding a South Australian eighth-wicket partnership record of 171 in 131 minutes with Ian Chappell. He also played a leading part in South Australia's Sheffield Shield victory in 1970–71, opening the bowling with Jeff Hammond and taking 23 wickets at 19.00.

McCarthy's best first-class bowling figures were 6 for 114 in the first innings against New South Wales in 1970–71, out of a total of 7 for 441; the other wicket fell to a run out. Against Victoria in 1969–70 he was South Australia's highest scorer with 39 and 24, but did not take a wicket. He played a major part in South Australia's one-wicket victory over New South Wales in 1971–72, taking 2 for 44 and 3 for 42 and scoring 17 not out and 32 not out. In the second innings he and Mike Hendricks came together with the score at 9 for 214 when South Australia needed 263 to win, and they put on an unbroken 51 for the last wicket to win the match with five overs to spare.

McCarthy was a stalwart for Glenelg from 1962–63 to 1976–77. The Kevin McCarthy Trophy is now awarded annually to Glenelg's leading first-grade bowler. He also played 10 SANFL games for Glenelg in 1965, kicking 22 goals.
