= Toorak Gardens, South Australia =

Toorak Gardens
- Suburb
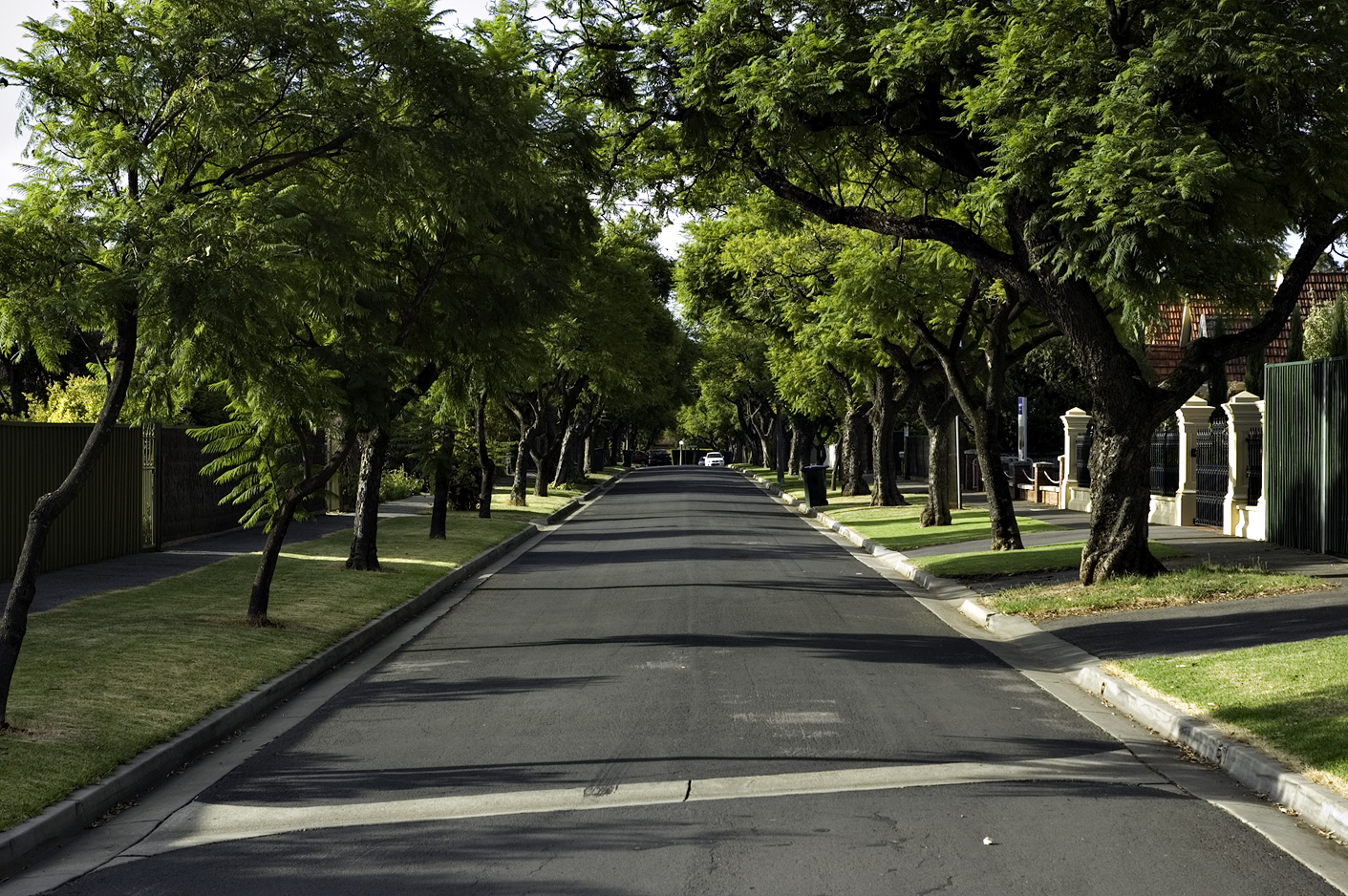
- Tree-lined street typical of the area.

- Country: Australia
- State: South Australia
- City: Adelaide
- LGA: City of Burnside
- Location: 2 km (1.2 mi) from Adelaide
- Established: 1917

Government
  - State electorate: Bragg
  - Federal division: Sturt

Area
  - Total: 1.11 km^{2} (0.43 sq mi)

Population
  - Total: 2,604 (SAL 2021)
- Postcode: 5065
Suburbs around Toorak Gardens
Norwood	Norwood	Kensington
Rose Park; Dulwich	Toorak Gardens	Marryatville; Heathpool; Tusmore
Glenside	Glenunga	Linden Park

Toorak Gardens is a leafy, mainly residential inner eastern suburb of Adelaide, South Australia, located 2 km east of the Adelaide city centre.

This is one of South Australia’s most expensive suburbs. It is characterised by tree-lined streets and detached single story villas, Tudor Revival and bungalow houses built in the 1920s and 1930s on allotments of around 0.25 acres (0.1 hectares).

The Toorak Gardens area was part of the then larger and now adjacent suburb of Rose Park. Between 1912 and 1917 it was named "Toorak" and subsequently "Toorak Gardens". Originally farmland owned by the Fergusson and Prescott families in the 19th century, it was subdivided and gained popularity in 1920s.

First Creek, part of the Torrens catchment, runs through the north-east corner of the suburb. Toorak Gardens is in the local government area of the City of Burnside, and is bounded to the north by Kensington Road, to the east by Portrush Road, to the south by Greenhill Road and to the west by Prescott Terrace and Warwick Avenue.

It contains the Burnside Hospital, the only hospital in the City of Burnside.

== History ==
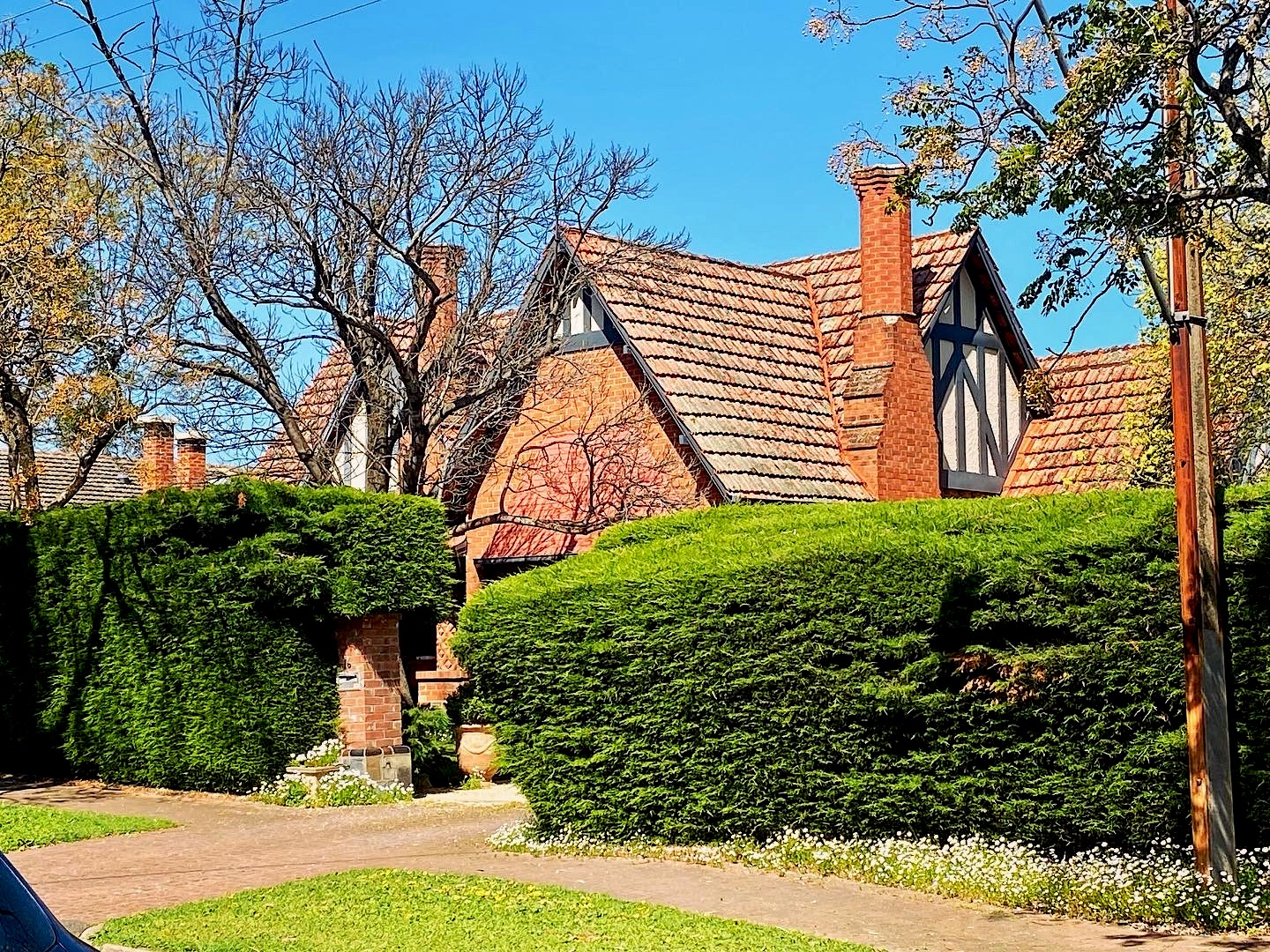
A Tudor Revival house in Toorak Gardens

Possibilities for derivation of the name Toorak are Torrak, an aboriginal word meaning tea-tree springs, toora an Aboriginal word for coot or malleefowl and other aboriginal words of similar pronunciation meaning reedy swamp and black crow. Today's suburb of Toorak Gardens is composed of parts of the Adelaide sections of 275 (Toorak) and 274 (Monreith Farm). Section 274 was bounded by (in clockwise order) Swaine Avenue, Portrush Road, Greenhill Road and Fullarton Road. Section 275 was bounded by Kensington Road, Portrush Road, Swaine Avenue and Prescott Terrace. The suburb of Toorak was first developed in 1912, largely on land that had previously been the eastern half of the Prescott Farm. Before its development into a village, it had been farmland up until that point with little settlement apart from the Prescott's home and worksheds as well as two large and extravagant houses.

Julia Hallett owned a spectacular mansion on Portrush Road (now located at No. 15) while Benjamin Burford had a grand mansion on Kensington Road that he named Attunga. When the suburb was first planned, laid-out and named there were many objections, primarily because of the association with the elite Melbourne suburb of Toorak (which remains wealthy and upper-class to this day). The real estate agents assigned to the suburb received many complaints due to this association, including one signed 'No Snobbery'. Extensive building restrictions were placed on development in the early suburb. After the first houses had been built, the Adelaide Mail reported on 18 May 1912:

"...only one house is allowed on each block, to cost not less than £600. Wood was naturally tabooed, the materials being set down as either brick, stone or reinforced concrete, with slate, iron or tile roofs. Nearly all the houses are being roofed with Marseilles tiles, giving a pleasant appearance to the suburb which is springing up there... where superior homes can be built of bought without fear of getting undesirable surroundings."

Toorak received considerable attention from real-estate businesses, the press and the community at large. The Adelaide papers paid particular notice to the suburb's developments, announcing council work on the suburb's paths and gardens. In 1912 when trees were planted on Grant and Alexandra avenues, in 1914 when flower strips were developed on the kerbs, in 1916 when a reserve was created on Giles Street; they were all quickly reported. The Toorak Bowling Club was also developed in this era, it stands to this day.

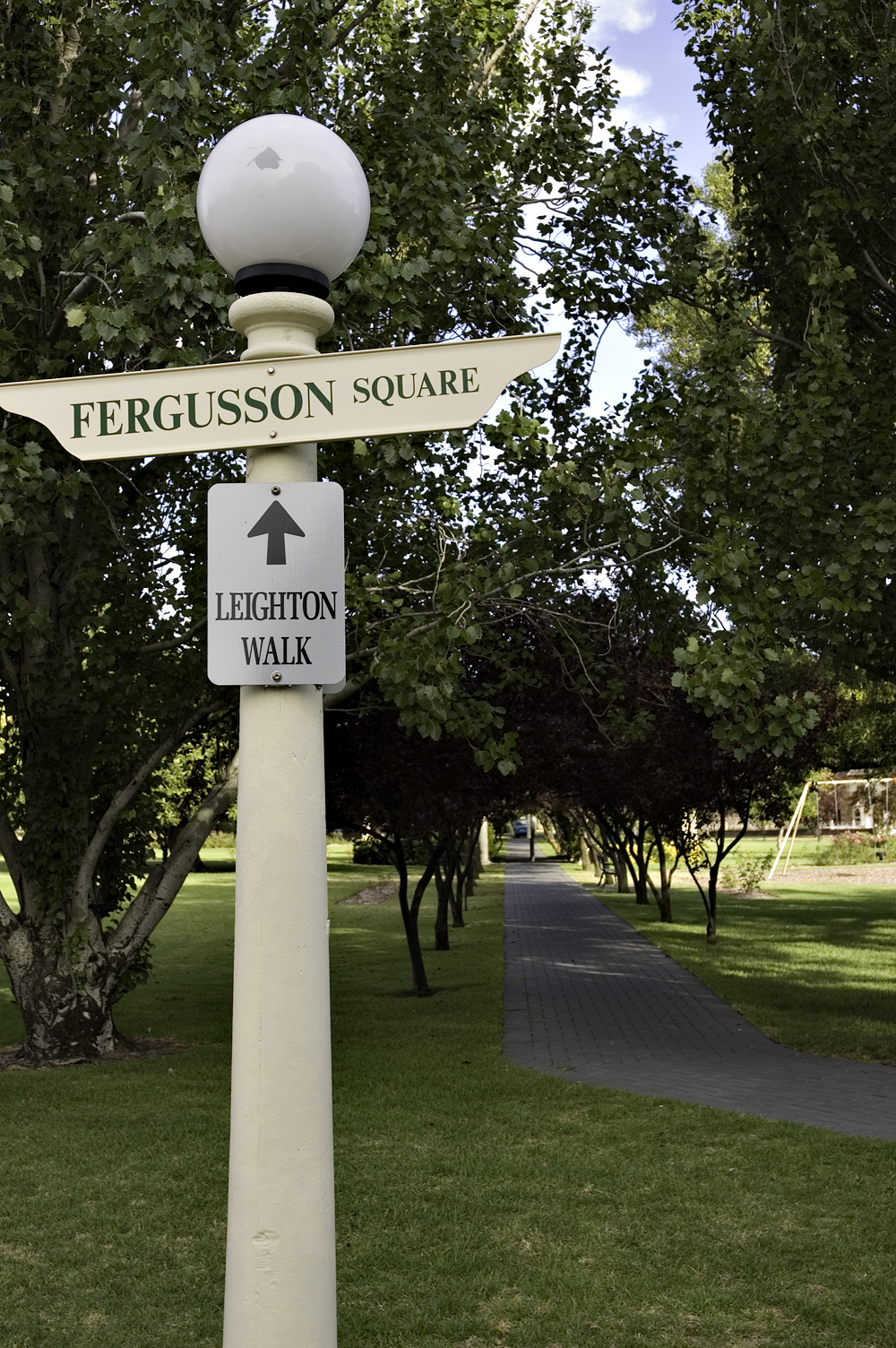
Fergusson Square, the only park in the suburb

Section 274 was bought by a Scottish family, the Fergussons. It was purchased along with property at Knoxville (today's suburbs of Glenunga and Glenside) and named by the family. They had come from the village of Monreith in Wigtown County, Scotland and gave that name to their new farm. The Monreith farm was steadily developed by the family, but with the death of Alexander Fergusson in 1869, the property passed into the hands of his widow, Agnes. She sold off parts of the farm in 1883 for £15,000, and the remainder in 1917 for £20,000. Before the farm was sold, the Fergussons had established a flour mill, horse stabling and were engaging in business ventures in various parts of the state. It was in 1917 that Monreith was given its modern name of Toorak Gardens. Developers started subdividing the new suburb on much the same lines as Toorak had been, with similar building restrictions and much media attention. The original Fergusson family home was demolished in 1923 and the family settled in separate houses on Cudmore Avenue. Miss Ivy Laver, a successful local businesswoman, was responsible for building the main park of Toorak Gardens, Fergusson Square. It remains as a monument to those who first settled the area.

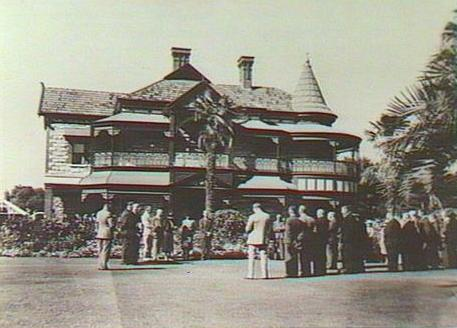
The Attunga property being inspected by the Burnside Council in 1944

Benjamin Burford's Attunga property contained the largest and most extravagant mansion built in the suburb, and with his passing it was bought in 1905 by an investor from Broken Hill, Otto Georg Ludwig von Rieben. Although living at the property for 37 years, maintaining it, and paying particular attention to the gardens, von Rieben eventually settled on a property at Mount Lofty in the Adelaide Hills. Attunga however, almost forty years after he gained it, was offered to the Burnside Council free of charge in 1944 for use as a hospital, on the condition that the house and grounds be maintained. A Council committee had previously suggested building a community hospital in August 1943, as part of its Post-War Reconstruction and Development Plan; it was to cost no more than £100,000, and was to remain as a memorial to honour Burnside's war dead. In April 1949 the first conversion of von Rieben's home was completed, as a convalescent home caring for 21 patients. It closed in September 1956, having cared for over 1,400 patients. The adjacent newly completed Burnside War Memorial Hospital opened in October, and received its first patients in November 1956.

== Geography ==
Toorak Gardens has an area of 1.11 km^{2} with a population density of 2,303/km^{2}. (2006 census) Situated on the Adelaide Plains at an average elevation of 80 metres above sea level and a kilometre east of the parklands, the suburb is rectangular shaped and wholly urbanised. There is only one notable park, Fergusson Square; the only other open space is provided by the Toorak Bowling Club.

Prior to European settlement, the area was heavily forested. Blue Gum and River Gum trees grew on the floodplains around First and Second creeks. Grey box woodlands, known to early settlers as the 'black forest', grew around and south of Greenhill Road. Native Australia flora and fauna inhabited the plains.

With the advent of colonisation, much of the forest was cleared and replaced by farmland, on which wheat and barley were grown. First Creek provided a reliable source of water, and crops flourished. In the late 19th century, the area that today comprises Toorak Gardens was almost completely free of native vegetation. When the land was sold and subdivided, with streets beginning to run through it, lush gardens were grown. The new wealthy white inhabitants, both of their own preference, and under duty from the land deed, put much effort into the suburb's greenery.

== Facilities and attractions ==
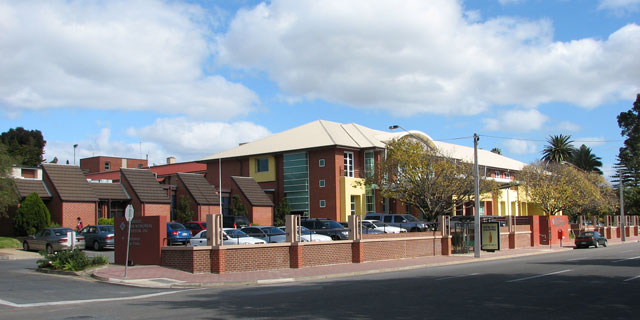
Burnside Hospital from Kensington Road

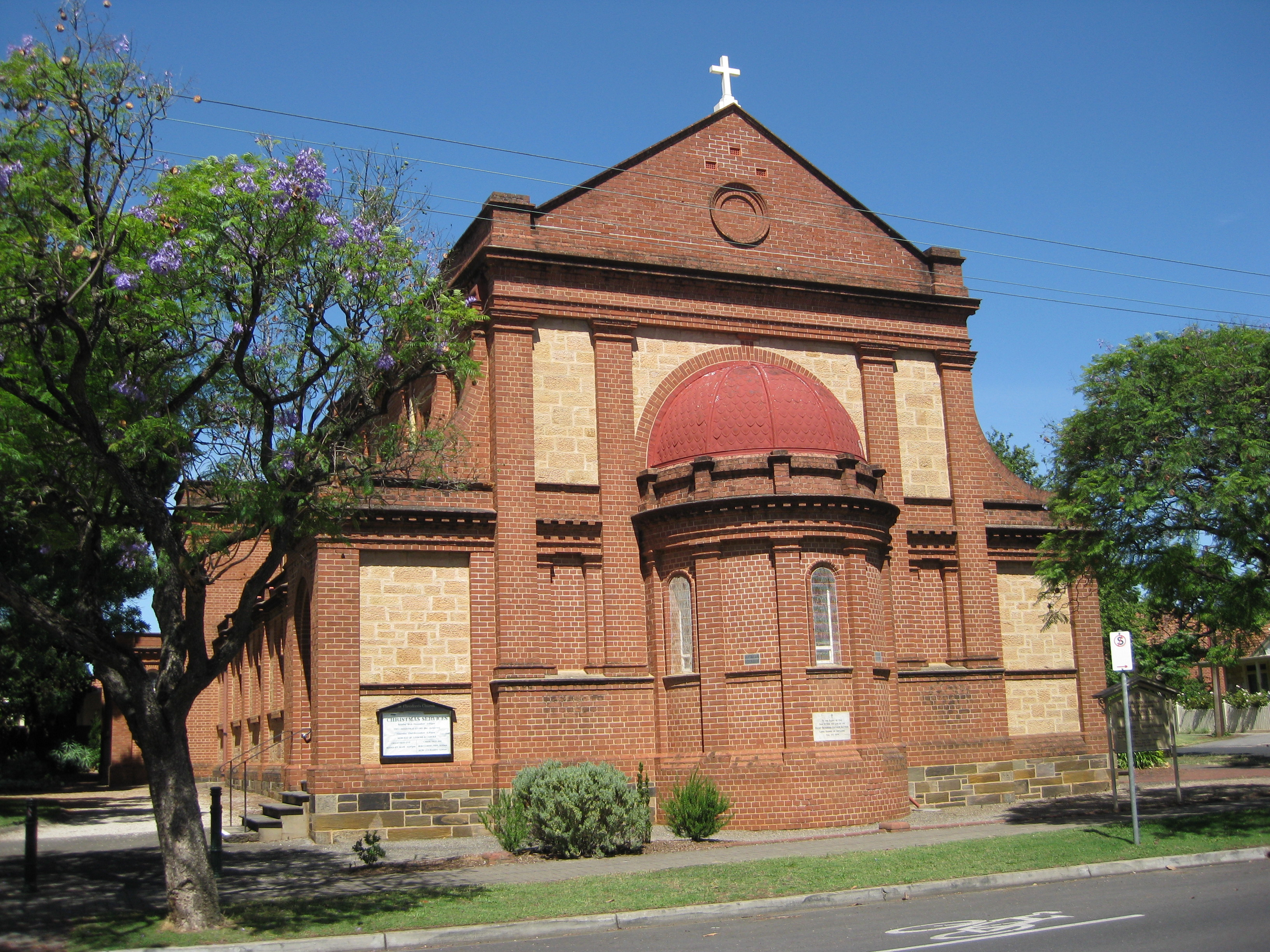
St Theodore's Anglican Church

Burnside Hospital, which was converted from the grand mansion Attunga in 1949, is Burnside's only hospital. It is a private hospital.

While Toorak Gardens is a small mainly residential suburb, there are several attractions of note. The only shopping inside the suburb is at the Greenhill Rd / Portrush Rd corner, where there is a small precinct of shops. This is popular because of its close proximity to Burnside Village (i.e. Burnside village is in the other side of Greenhill Road). One of the most popular places is the Trak Cinema–this is a small cinema which is well known for its arthouse screenings, but it also shows mainstream releases. A restaurant, Grimaldi's, is situated in the same group of shops and is popular with locals and visitors.

The only park in the suburb is Fergusson Square (named after the Fergusson family), which was developed by Ivy Laver shortly after World War I.

The Anglican Church of St Theodore is located on the corner of Prescott Terrace and Swaine Avenue. It was originally established in what is now the Rose Park Primary School, and then moved to the current site.

The Toorak Burnside Bowling Club Inc, surrounded on three sides by Grant Ave, Alexandra Ave and Giles St, has two greens and up to four weekly competitions.

== Governance ==
Toorak Gardens is part of the state electoral district of Bragg, which has been held since 2002 by Liberal MP and current South Australian Attorney-General Vickie Chapman. In federal politics, the suburb is now part of the division of Sturt, which has been represented by James Stevens since 2019. As Toorak Gardens does not have a booth at state or federal level, the results shown are from the Rose Park Primary School polling booth in nearby Rose Park.

At local government level, Toorak Gardens is part of the City of Burnside, and falls within the Rose Park and Toorak Gardens ward.

== Demographics ==
According to the 2001 Census, the population of the Toorak Gardens census area was 2,595 and stable, with only a minor decrease in population between the 1996 and 2001 censuses. 55.0% of the population was female, 80.3% were Australian born and over 92% of residents were Australian citizens.
