= Albert Gillespie =

Australian cricketer and Royal Air Force officer

Personal information
- Full name: Albert George Gillespie
- Born: 7 June 1912; Rose Park, South Australia, Australia
- Died: 7 August 1938 (aged 26); Great Barton, Suffolk, England
- Batting: Unknown
- Bowling: Unknown

Career statistics
Competition	First-class
Matches	1
Runs scored	11
Batting average	5.50
100s/50s	–/–
Top score	10
Balls bowled	90
Wickets	1
Bowling average	48.00
5 wickets in innings	–
10 wickets in match	–
Best bowling	1/33
Catches/stumpings	–/–
- Source: Cricinfo, 19 February 2019

Albert George Gillespie (7 June 1912 – 7 August 1938) was an Australian first-class cricketer and Royal Air Force officer.

Gillespie was born in the Adelaide suburb of Rose Park. He studied medicine in Adelaide and Melbourne, before moving to London in 1937 to further his studies. With the looming threat of Nazism across Europe, Gillespie cut short his studies to enlist in the Royal Air Force, joining as an acting pilot officer in February 1937. He played first-class cricket in August of the same year for a Combined Services cricket team against the touring New Zealanders at Portsmouth. Batting twice during the match, he scored a single run in the Combined Services first-innings before being dismissed by Lindsay Weir, while in their second-innings he was dismissed by Jack Cowie for 10 runs. He also bowled fifteen overs across the match, taking the wicket of Martin Donnelly in the New Zealanders first-innings. He was confirmed in the rank of pilot officer in November 1937.

Gillespie was one of five fatalities when the Handley Harrow he was aboard crashed in heavy fog and rain during exercises near Great Barton during the early hours of August 7, 1938. He was subsequently buried at St Nicholas' Church, Feltwell.
