= Marie Brown =

Activist in South Australia; founder of the Mothers and Babies Health Association

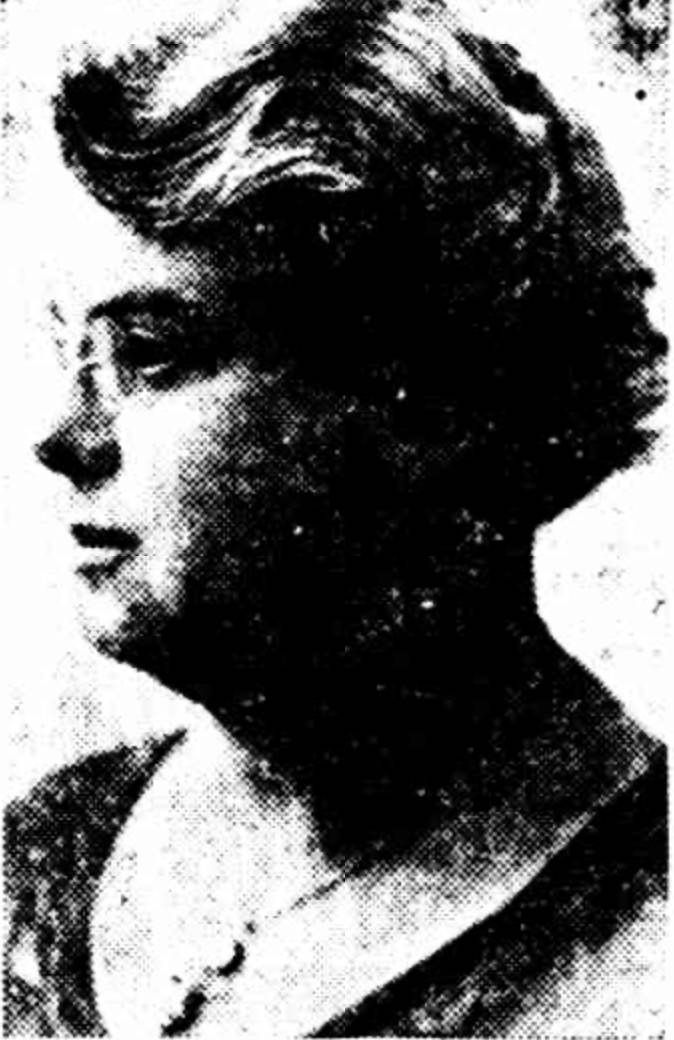
- Born: 1883
- Died: 22 November 1949 (aged 65–66)
- Occupation: Medical doctor

Marie Brown (née Simpson; 1883 – 22 November 1949) was a medical doctor and activist in South Australia. She was a founder of the Mothers and Babies Health Association.

== Biography ==
Marie Simpson was born in Nottingham, England. She qualified MB, BS at the University of London in 1907. In 1913, she was awarded a Diploma in Public Health at Sheffield University. She arrived in South Australia on the Mongolia on 13 November 1914.

She married Dr. Gilbert Brown (14 August 1883 – 1960) that same day, and for a time lived and worked at Snowtown. They had a son Ian on 29 May 1917 and lived for a while at Strangways Terrace, North Adelaide, then at 31 Watson Avenue, Rose Park for a few years. They settled at 36 Walkerville Terrace, Gilberton.

Brown had a strong empathy with public health and women's and children's welfare organizations. She became involved with the School for Mothers (later the Mothers and Babies Health Association) in 1920, and for many years served as their honorary medical officer, deputy Chief Medical Officer and director of their ante-natal clinic. She was particularly known for her lectures on children's health. She was also honorary medical officer of the Kindergarten Union and a member of the National Council of Women.

In 1922, she stood unsuccessfully as a candidate for the City Council's MacDonnell Ward, under the auspices of the Women's Non-Party Association (later the League of Women Voters).
