= Attunga, Toorak Gardens =

Mansion in Toorak Gardens, South Australia

Coordinates: 34°55′40″S 138°38′17″E

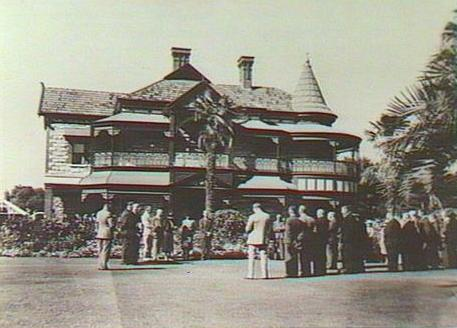
The official handover of "Attunga" by Otto von Rieben to the City of Burnside.

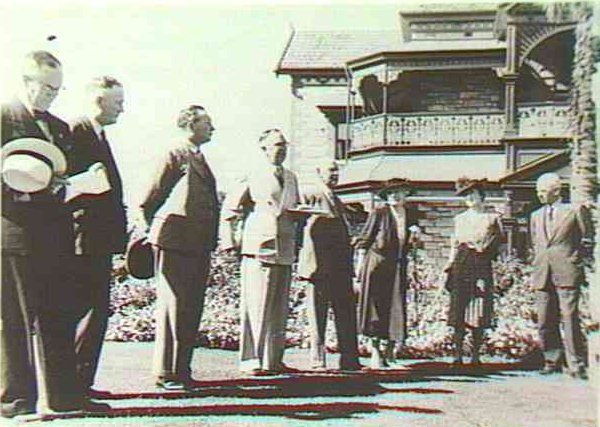
Official party at "Attunga" to inspect the gift of Otto von Rieben to the City of Burnside: l-r Rt. Hon Lord Mayor, Mr. R. Walker; Chief Sec. Mr. Lyell McEwin; Premier Mr. Thomas Playford; Mayor Mr. Philip R. Claridge; Mr Otto Von Rieben; Miss Gertrude Engelhart (von Rieben's niece); Mrs Philip R. Claridge; Cr. T.R. Mellor

Attunga was a mansion which now forms part of Burnside Hospital, in Toorak Gardens, South Australia.

== History ==
The mansion was designed by F. W. Dancker for Benjamin Burford in 1900. It was built on 4.5 acres (1.8 ha) at 120 Kensington Road, in what was then Rose Park, (an inner eastern suburb of Adelaide, South Australia). Containing 14 rooms, the two-storey house is the largest and most extravagant mansion built in the area that became known as the suburb of Toorak Gardens.

With Burford's death in 1905, the property was bought by an investor from Broken Hill, Otto Georg Ludwig von Rieben. (Note: Von Rieben is also the name of a noble family from Mecklenburg, Germany; see: de:Rieben (Adelsgeschlecht) (in German)) While maintaining and paying particular attention to the property, von Rieben eventually settled at "Pomona" at Mt Lofty in the Adelaide Hills.

In August 1943, a committee of Burnside Council suggested building a community hospital as part of the council's Post-War Reconstruction and Development Plan. In November 1943, the council adopted the committee's recommendation to spend up to £100,000 on the building of a hospital, which was intended to be the district's principal memorial to honour Burnside's war dead. In 1944, almost 40 years after he purchased it, and having lived in it for 37 years, Von Rieben (then aged 82) offered Attunga to the Burnside Council free of charge, for use as a hospital, with the stipulation that the house and gardens be preserved. In February 1944, Mayor P.R. Claridge announced von Rieben's donation. The council subsequently unanimously accepted the donation.

By April 1949, the first stage of the conversion of the mansion had been completed, with Attunga having been converted into a convalescent hospital caring for 21 patients. When it closed in September 1956 it had cared for over 1,400 patients. In October 1956, the adjacent new 45-bed Burnside War Memorial Hospital, built at a cost of £145,000, was opened.

== Current use ==
Since March 1989 the mansion has been used as the "Attunga Medical Centre". In the 21st century, the mansion and its well-kept formal gardens continue to occupy nearly all of the western half of the original 4.5 acres (1.8 ha), with multi-story hospital buildings covering most of the eastern half of the original area.
