= Barry Norsworthy =

Australian rules footballer (1951–2021)

Personal information
- Full name: Barry Graham Norsworthy
- Born: 16 October 1951; Queen Victoria Maternity Hospital, Rose Park, South Australia
- Died: 17 September 2021 (aged 69)
- Original team: Central District (SANFL)
- Height: 173 cm (5 ft 8 in)
- Weight: 72 kg (159 lb)

Playing career^{1}
Years	Club	Games (Goals)
1977–1979	Melbourne	21 (18)
- ^{1} Playing statistics correct to the end of 1979.

Barry Norsworthy (16 October 1951 – 17 September 2021) was an Australian rules footballer who played for Central District in the South Australian National Football League (SANFL) and Melbourne in the Victorian Football League (VFL) during the late 1960s and 1970s.

== Family ==
The son of Graham Ernest Norsworthy, and Marjorie June Norsworthy, née Hill, Barry Graham Norsworthy was born at the Queen Victoria Maternity Hospital at Rose Park, South Australia on 16 October 1951.

== Football ==
Barry Norsworthy, a rover, and the older brother of Mark Norsworthy, began his career in the South Australian National Football League (SANFL) in 1969 with Central District.

He won their 'best and fairest' award in 1975; and, in the same year, represented South Australia in interstate matches against Victoria and Tasmania.

After another 'best and fairest' the following season he transferred to the Melbourne Football Club, but had little success. He returned to Central District once his Melbourne stint was over and retired after playing 158 SANFL games.
