= Helen Mayo =

Australian medical doctor and medical educator (1878–1967)

Helen Mayo OBE
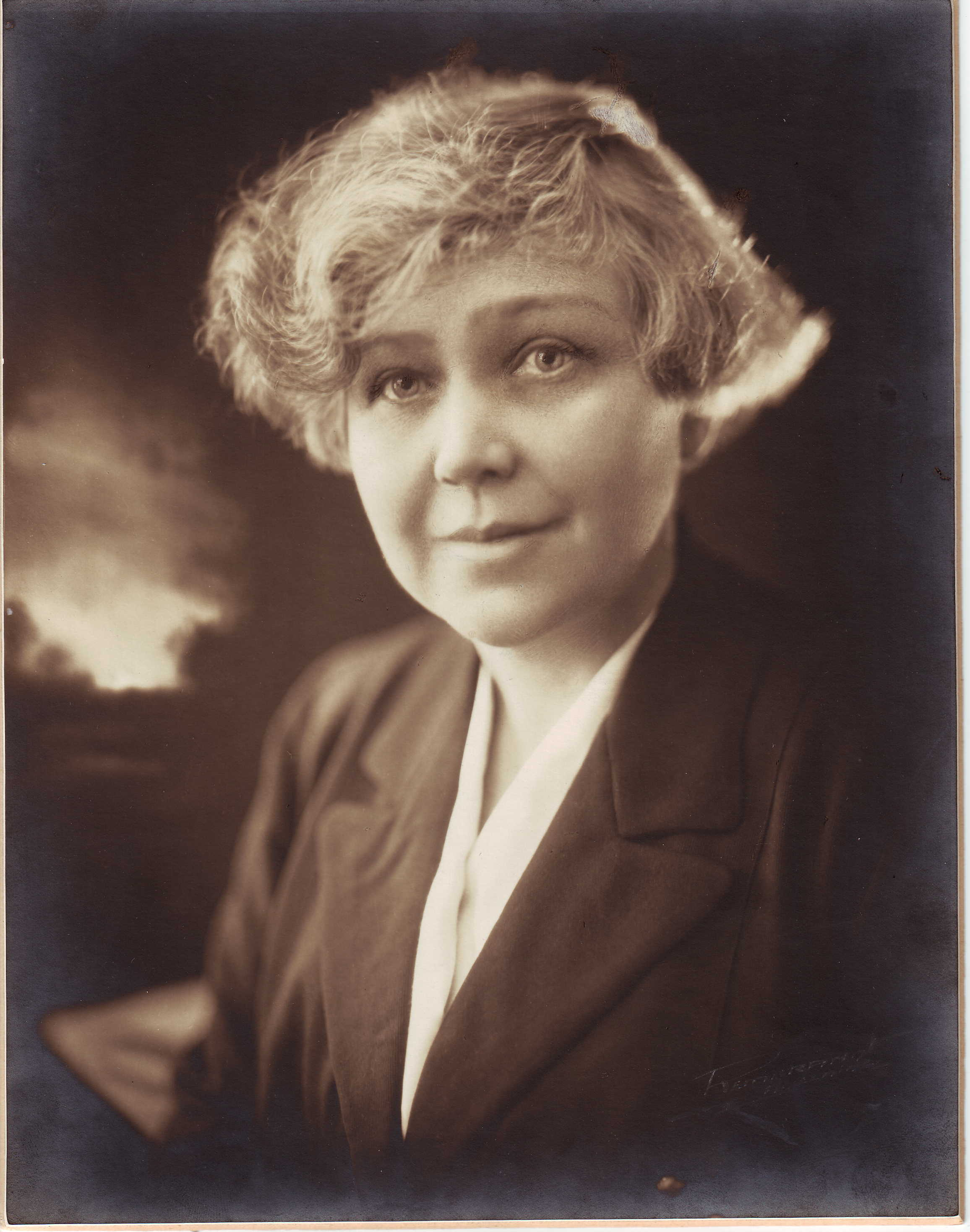
- Mayo, c. 1914
- Born: 1 October 1878; Adelaide, Province of South Australia
- Died: 13 November 1967 (aged 89); Adelaide, Australia
- Occupations: Medical doctor; medical educator

Helen Mary Mayo OBE (1 October 1878 – 13 November 1967) was an Australian medical doctor and medical educator, born and raised in Adelaide. In 1896, she enrolled at the University of Adelaide, where she studied medicine. After graduating, Mayo spent two years working in infant health in England, Ireland and British India. She returned to Adelaide in 1906, starting a private practice and taking up positions at the Adelaide Children's Hospital and Adelaide Hospital (later the Royal Adelaide).

In 1909, she co-founded the School for Mothers, where mothers could receive advice on infant health. This organisation, which became the Mothers' and Babies' Health Association in 1927, eventually established branches across South Australia and incorporated a training school for maternal nurses. In 1914, after unsuccessfully campaigning for the Children's Hospital to treat infants, Mayo co-founded the Mareeba Hospital for infants.

In addition to her medical achievements, Mayo participated in a number of other organisations. She was heavily involved in the University of Adelaide, serving on the university council from 1914 to 1960 (the first woman in Australia to be elected to such a position) and establishing a women's club and boarding college there.

She was also the founder of the Adelaide Lyceum Club, an organisation for professional women. Mayo died in 1967, with the Medical Journal of Australia attributing the success of South Australia's infant welfare system to her efforts.

== Early life and education ==
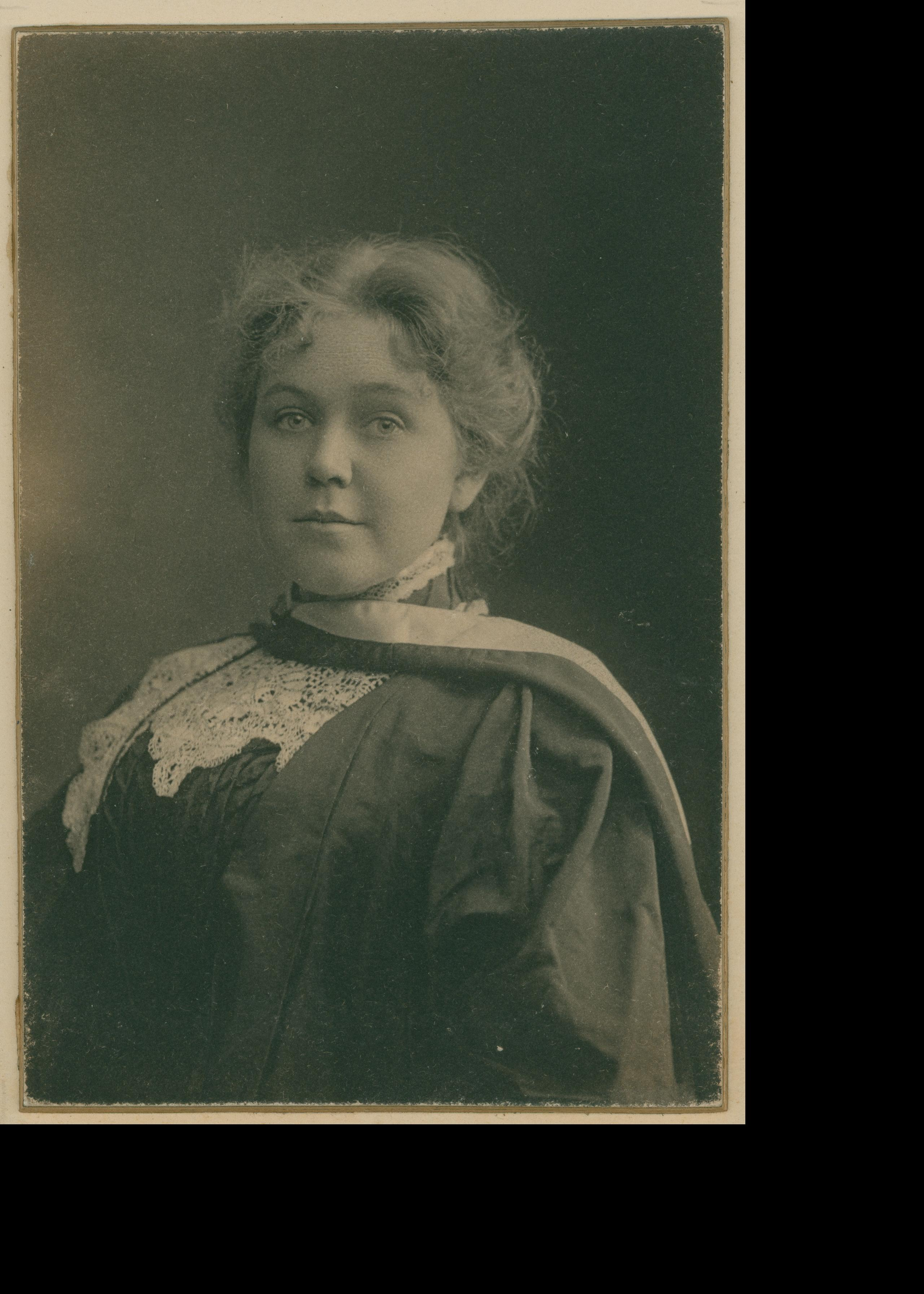
Helen Mayo c 1902

Helen Mary Mayo was born in Adelaide, Australia on 1 October 1878. She was the eldest of the seven children of George Gibbes Mayo (1845–1921), a civil engineer, and Henrietta Mary Mayo, née Donaldson, (1852–1930) and granddaughter of George Mayo, a prominent Adelaide doctor, and Maria Gandy. Her formal education commenced at the age of 10, when she began receiving regular lessons with a tutor. At the age of 16, she was enrolled in the Advanced School for Girls on Grote Street (a forerunner of Adelaide High School), from which she matriculated after one year, at the end of 1895.

Despite never having heard of female doctors, from an early age Mayo had been set on pursuing a career in medicine. However, Edward Rennie, then a professor at the University of Adelaide advised Helen's father that she was too young to commence study in Medicine, so in 1896, Mayo enrolled in the Faculty of Arts at the University of Adelaide. The death of her younger sister Olive at the end of her first year of study meant that Mayo was unable to sit her final exams for that year, and when she repeated her first year in 1897, she failed two of her five subjects (Latin and Greek). Having gained her father's permission, Mayo enrolled in medicine in 1898. She was a distinguished medicine student, coming top of her class and winning the Davis Thomas scholarship and the Everard Scholarship in her fourth and fifth years of study, respectively.

== Medical career ==
Upon her graduation at the end of 1902, Mayo took up a position as a resident medical officer at the Adelaide Hospital. In February 1904, she left for England to gain practical experience. There she worked as a clinical clerk at the Hospital for Sick Children in Great Ormond Street, London. To gain experience in midwifery, she went to Coombe Women's Hospital in Dublin, and after returning to London to complete a course in tropical medicine, she travelled to India where she worked for a year as a midwife in a Cambridge Mission to Delhi hospital for women and children. In 1906, Mayo returned to Adelaide and started a private practice in premises owned by her father on Morphett Street, next to the family home. With spare time on her hands, she began laboratory work at the Adelaide Hospital and took up an appointment as honorary anaesthetist at the Adelaide Children's Hospital.

=== Mothers' and Babies' Health Association ===
In May 1909, Mayo presented a paper to an interstate conference on the subject of infant mortality. In it, she addressed the high infant mortality rate in South Australia, and claimed that more needed to be done to educate women for motherhood. Later that year, after hearing a talk about the success of a school for mothers in London, she and Harriet Stirling (the daughter of Edward Stirling) founded the School for Mothers in Adelaide. The Kindergarten Union made a room in its offices available for one afternoon a week, where a nurse would weigh babies and Mayo and Stirling would give advice.

At the first annual meeting of the School a prominent medical doctor criticised the organisation for thinking that spinsters could teach mothers, who were guided by the "mother instinct" (both Mayo and Stirling were childless). In spite of this, the organisation flourished, and in 1911 a cottage in Wright Street was purchased and became the headquarters of the School. In 1927, the organisation became the Mothers' and Babies' Health Association (MBHA), and by 1932, it had branches throughout South Australia.

Mayo's colleagues during this period included Dr. Marie Brown (1883–1949). Mayo served as the honorary medical officer of the association until her death in 1967, by which time the organisation gained a training school for maternal nurses and a hospital. In her honour, the Association inaugurated the annual Helen Mayo lecture. Eventually, in 1981, the Mothers' and Babies' Health Association was incorporated into the Department of Health of the South Australian Government. After visiting Melbourne to learn how to make vaccines, in 1911 Mayo was appointed clinical bacteriologist at the Adelaide Hospital, a position she would hold for 22 years.

=== Mareeba Hospital ===
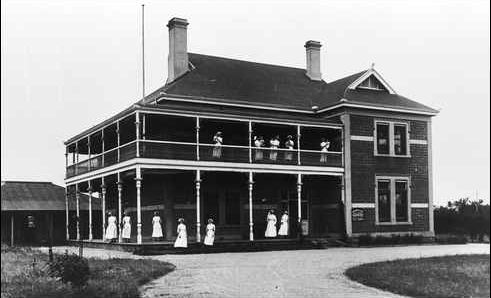
The Mareeba Hospital, c 1917

In the early part of the 1910s, there was an urgent need for medical facilities to treat infants in South Australia since, due to the risks of cross-infection, the Adelaide Children's Hospital (ACH) would not treat those under the age of two. In 1913, Mayo and Stirling called a meeting of medical practitioners to discuss the prospect of a hospital for these children. After doubts about the practicality of such a plan were expressed, the group raised some funds and presented to the board of the ACH a plan to use the funds to build a separate ward on the grounds of the hospital. The board rejected the proposal, so Mayo and her group rented a two-storey house in St. Peter's and opened a hospital for infants in 1914.

Financial difficulties became overwhelming and the state government took over the hospital in 1917. moving it to Woodville and renaming it the Mareeba Hospital, or Mareeba Babies' Hospital.

Mayo played a central role in establishing Mareeba Hospital and forming its policy, serving as honorary physician, and as honorary responsible officer from 1921 to 1946. To combat the risks of cross-infection, she instituted a policy of strict isolation of babies from other patients. Each child had their own locker, where their own equipment would be kept, gowns used by nurses to tend to one child would only be used for that child, and blankets, bottles and floors were all sterilised. Mareeba eventually became a 70-bed hospital, complete with a surgical unit and a ward for premature babies.

ACH ran the hospital from 1951 to 1960, when it was absorbed into the Queen Elizabeth Hospital, as the Mareeba Children's Annex.

=== Later medical career ===
In 1919, The Adelaide Children's Hospital advertised for honorary physicians. Believing that her gender would prevent her being given the position, Mayo initially declined to apply. However, following a recommendation by Adelaide surgeon Henry Simpson Newland, Mayo applied for the post, and that year was appointed honorary Assistant Physician in charge of outpatients. With positions at the Royal Adelaide Hospital, the Children's Hospital and the Mareeba Hospital, as well as commitments at her private practice, Mayo commenced her Doctor of Medicine degree in 1925. She used her experiences as a clinical bacteriologist at the Adelaide Hospital as the basis for her thesis, which she was forced to write on the weekends, such was the volume of her workload. The following year, she became the first woman to receive an MD from the University of Adelaide. She was subsequently appointed honorary physician to inpatients at the Children's Hospital, and a clinical lecturer at the University of Adelaide. In May 1935 Mayo was appointed an Officer of the Order of the British Empire (OBE) "for services in connection with maternal and child welfare in the state of South Australia."

She retired in 1938 and became an honorary consulting physician at the Children's Hospital, but when the Second World War broke out, she returned to the hospital as senior paediatric adviser, at the same time organising the Red Cross donor transfusion service. Dr Elma Linton Sandford-Morgan (22 February 1890 – 1983), author of ABC of Mothercraft, was appointed medical officer for MBHA in 1937. She was a daughter of industrialist and politician A. Wallace Sandford.

== Other activities ==
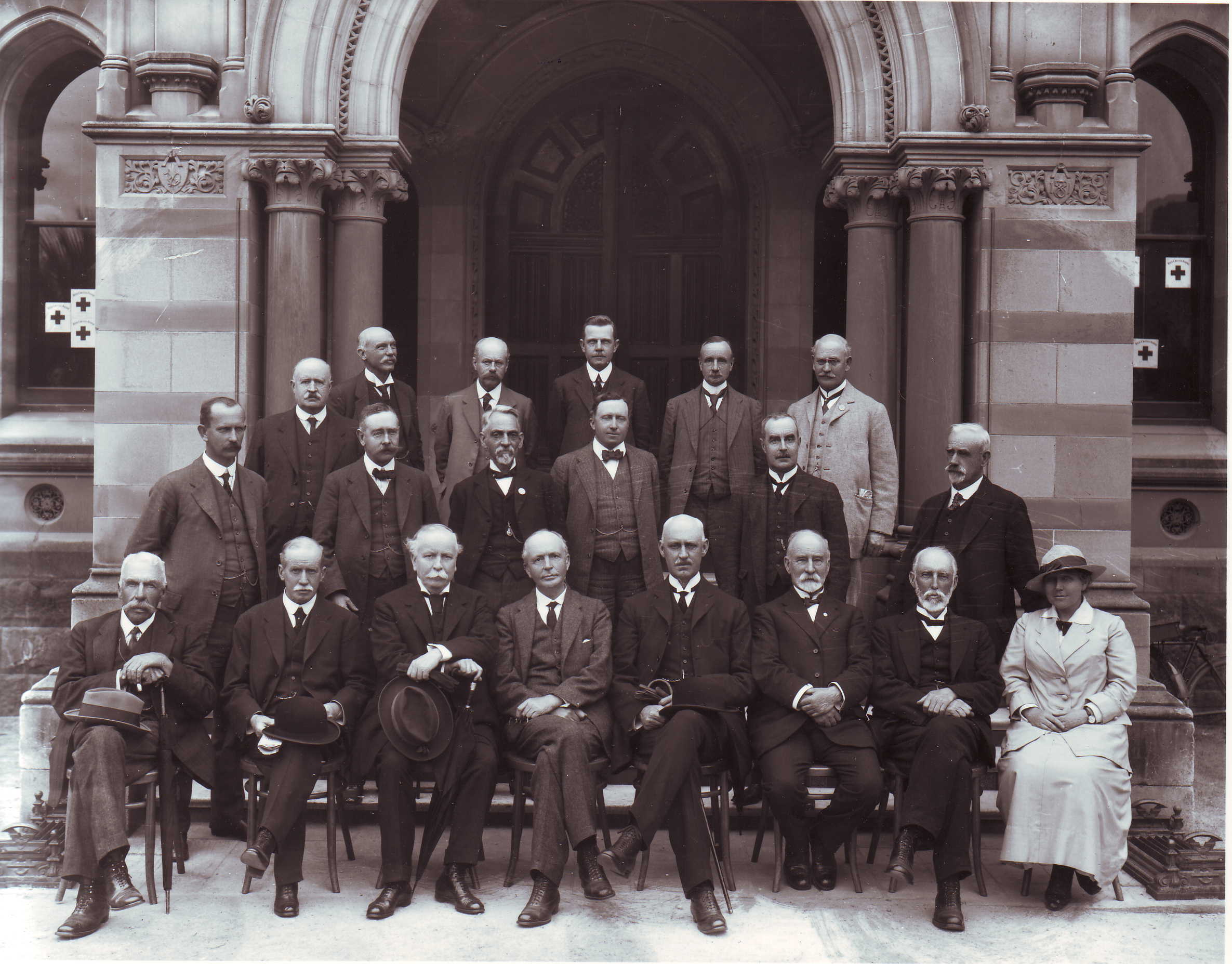
The University of Adelaide Council in 1919. Helen Mayo is first on the right in the front row.

Mayo became the first woman in Australia to be elected to a university council when, in 1914, she was elected to the Council of the University of Adelaide, a position she held for 46 years. She founded, in 1922, the Adelaide Lyceum Club, and was its inaugural president. The club provided a place for women who were leaders in their respective fields to meet, and aimed to "advance the status of women in the world of arts and letters".

Mayo was also heavily involved in the life of female students and graduates of the University of Adelaide. She spearheaded the foundation of the Women Student's Club (eventually the Women's Union) in 1909, and in 1921 initiated efforts to unify the various student bodies at that University into what would eventually become the Adelaide University Union. The construction of the Lady Simon Building for the Women's Union was due in large part to her efforts, as was the founding of St. Ann's College, where she served as chairperson from 1939 to 1959.

Mayo died 13 November 1967, aged 89. In its obituary, the Medical Journal of Australia described her as "the doyen of medical women in South Australia (and most probably Australia)", and credited her with the efficiency of South Australia's infant health welfare system.

Helen Mayo Crescent in the Canberra suburb of Bonython is named in her honour, as is the Federal Division of Mayo. She was posthumously inducted onto the Victorian Honour Roll of Women in 2001.

== Family ==
Helen Mayo never married, but shared a house at North Adelaide with her partner, Dr. Constance Finlayson, and Miss Gertrude Young, sister of Walter James Young. The psychologist Elton Mayo (1880–1949) and judge Sir Herbert Mayo (1885–1972) were her brothers.
