= Dean Trowse =

Australian cricketer

Personal information
- Full name: Dean Frederick Trowse
- Born: 18 October 1931; Rose Park, South Australia
- Died: 24 September 2005 (aged 73); Auchenflower, Queensland
- Batting: Right-handed

Domestic team information
- Years: Team
- 1951–52 to 1955–56: South Australia

Career statistics
Competition	First-class
Matches	22
Runs scored	911
Batting average	23.97
100s/50s	1/4
Top score	102
Balls bowled	–
Wickets	–
Bowling average	–
5 wickets in innings	–
10 wickets in match	–
Best bowling	–
Catches/stumpings	15/0
- Source: Cricinfo, 6 May 2014

Dean Frederick Trowse (18 October 1931 – 24 September 2005) was a first-class cricketer who played for South Australia from 1952 to 1955.

His best season was 1952–53, when he scored 471 runs at an average of 33.64, including three fifties and his only century, 102 against New South Wales. In the next match he made 98 in 165 minutes against Queensland, the top score of a match which South Australia won by an innings, clinching the Sheffield Shield for the first time since 1938–39. Earlier in the season he made 74 against the touring South Africans, prompting the South Africa captain Jack Cheetham to call him "one of the best of the younger players in Australia" who "should have been taken to England with the Australian side" in 1953.

Failing to develop as a batsman, Trowse lost his place in the South Australian team in 1955-56 and lived for some time in Canada. When MCC toured Canada in 1959 he made 87 not out against them for Toronto Cricket Club in a one-day match, and 46 and 59 for Canada in a three-day match.

He worked as a chartered accountant. He later lived in the Brisbane suburb of Chapel Hill.
