= Renfrey Potts =

Australian mathematician (1925–2005)

Ren Potts
- Born: 4 October 1925; Adelaide, South Australia
- Died: 9 August 2005 (aged 79); Adelaide, South Australia
- Education: The University of Adelaide; Oxford University
- Known for: Potts model Ising-type models in mathematical physics Car-following and traffic flow Operations research, especially networks Difference equations Robotics
- Awards: ANZIAM Medal (1995)
- Scientific career
- Fields: Mathematician
- Workplaces: The University of Adelaide
- Thesis: The Mathematical Investigation of Some Cooperative Phenomena (1951)
- Doctoral advisor: Cyril Domb

Renfrey Burnard (Ren) Potts AO (1925–2005) was an Australian mathematician and is notable for the Potts model and his achievements in: operations research, especially networks; transportation science, car-following and road traffic; Ising-type models in mathematical physics; difference equations; and robotics. He was interested in computing from the early days of the computing revolution and oversaw the first computer purchases at the University of Adelaide.

== Personal ==
The fourth child of Gilbert MacDonald Potts and Lorna Potts (née West), named after family friend and medical doctor Renfrey Gershom Burnard, Potts was educated at Rose Park Primary School and Prince Alfred College, where his father was Second Master. Potts was an outstanding lecturer who drew large audiences to his talks. In addition to mathematics, he was interested in sports and music. His sporting activities included long distance and marathon running, hockey, tennis, squash, badminton, bushwalking, and swimming. He played both the piano and the clarinet and was a volunteer disc jockey at a local radio station. He married Barbara Kidman in Oxford on 1 July 1950. They had two daughters, Linda and Rebecca. They also had four grandchildren, Frank, Zoe, Jack and Georgia.

== Summary ==
- 1925 Born: 4 October 1925 Adelaide, South Australia, Australia
- 1930–1936 Rose Park Primary School
- 1937–1942 Prince Alfred College
- 1943–1947 University of Adelaide Bachelor of Science (First class honours in mathematics)
- 1948 Rhodes Scholar, Queen's College, Oxford
- 1949 Barbara Kidman graduated with first class Honours in Physics
- 1949–1951 D Phil, (Oxford), Dissertation: The Mathematical Investigation of Some Cooperative Phenomena, Advisor: Cyril Domb
- 1950 Married Barbara Kidman in Oxford on 1 July 1950
- 1951–1957 Lecturer in Mathematics at the University of Adelaide
- 1955–1956 Postdoctoral Scientist at the University of Maryland, USA
- 1956 Barbara Kidman awarded a PhD
- 1957–1959 Associate Professor at the University of Toronto in Canada
- 1958–1959 Consultant to General Motors in Detroit
- 1959 Awarded the Lanchester Prize for research in operations research
- 1959 Appointed to a newly created chair in applied mathematics at the University of Adelaide
- 1959–1990 Professor, Chair and popular lecturer of applied mathematics at the University of Adelaide
- 1966 Dr Kidman returns to workforce as lecturer in the (then) new area of Computer Science
- 1968 Doctor of Science (DSc) received from the University of Oxford
- 1975 fellow of the Australian Academy of Science (FAA)
- 1976 Appointed (Sir Thomas) Elder Professor of Mathematics
- Foundation President of the South Australian Computer Society (the forerunner of the Australian Computer Society). He is recognised as the founder of the Australian Computer Society, and was elected a Fellow of that society (FACS).
- 1978–9 chairman, Division of Applied Mathematics of the Australian Mathematical Society (the progenitor of ANZIAM)
- 1983 Fellow of the Australian Academy of Technological Sciences and Engineering (FTSE)
- 1987 Dr Kidman retires
- 1990 Prof Potts retires
- 1991 Emeritus Professor of Applied Mathematics at the University of Adelaide
- 1991 Officer of the Order of Australia (AO)
- 1991–1993 After his retirement from Adelaide, he taught as a visiting professor at the National University of Singapore for three semesters.
- 1994 Fellow of the Australian Mathematical Society (FAustMS)
- 1995 Inaugural recipient of the ANZAAS (Australian and New Zealand Association for the Advancement of Science) Medal
- 1995 Awarded first ANZIAM Medal
- 2001 Centenary Medal received from the Australian Government
- 2004 Inducted to the Pearcey Hall of Fame (The Pearcey Foundation)
- 2005 Died: 9 August 2005 Adelaide, South Australia, Australia.

== Publications ==
Most-cited publication:

- Potts, R. B. (1952). "Some Generalized Order-Disorder Transformations". Mathematical Proceedings of the Cambridge Philosophical Society. 48 (1): 106–109. doi:10.1017/S0305004100027419.

Some others:
(Ren published about 90 research papers)

=== Books ===
- With Robert Oliver, "Flows in Transportation Networks"
- 1978 Potts, R. B., "Transport in Australia: Some Key Issues", Australian Academy of Science, Canberra, 1978, 159 pp. ISBN 0-85847-048-9

=== Book chapters ===
- 1990 Potts, R. B., "Wilton, John Raymond (1884–1944), Mathematician", in John Ritchie (ed.), Australian Dictionary of Biography, vol. 12, Melbourne University Press, Melbourne, 1990, pp. 533–534

=== Journal articles ===
- 1959 Harold Willis Milnes, Renfrey B. Potts: "Boundary Contraction Solution of Laplace's Differential Equation" J. ACM 6(2): 226–235 (1959)] Article
- 1959 Robert Herman, Elliott W. Montroll, Renfrey B. Potts, and Richard W. Rohtery, "Traffic Dynamics: Analysis of Stability in Car Following", Operations Research 7, pp. 86–106 (January–February 1959)
- 1959 Denos C. Gazis, Robert Herman, and Renfrey B. Potts, "Car-Following Theory of Steady-State Traffic Flow", Operations Research 7, pp. 499–505 (July–August 1959).
- 1962 "The Measurement of Acceleration Noise—A Traffic Parameter", Trevor R. Jones, Renfrey B. Potts, Operations Research, Vol. 10, No. 6 (Nov. – Dec. 1962), pp. 745–763 Abstract
- 1982 "Differential and Difference Equations", Renfrey B. Potts, The American Mathematical Monthly, Vol. 89, No. 6 (Jun. – Jul. 1982), pp. 402–407 doi:10.2307/2321656 Abstract
- 1985 Potts, R. B., "Mathematics at the University of Adelaide, Part 3: 1944–1958", Australian Mathematical Society Gazette, vol. 12, no. 2, 1985, pp. 25–30.
- 1988 Tamar Flash, Renfrey B. Potts: "Discrete trajectory planning". October 1988, International Journal of Robotics Research, Volume 7 Issue 5 ACM PortalAbstract
- 2004 Wall, G. E., Pitman, Jane and Potts, R. B., "Eric Stephen Barnes, 1924–2000", Historical Records of Australian Science, vol. 15, no. 1, 2004, pp. 21–45. (Also available at http://www.publish.csiro.au/paper/HR03013.htm and https://web.archive.org/web/20090929205257/http://www.science.org.au/academy/memoirs/barnes.htm)

== Affiliations ==
- 1959 General Motors Corporation, Detroit, Michigan
- 1960s–1980s P.G. Pak-Poy & Associates, Adelaide
- 1988 Weizmann Institute of Science, Rehovot, Israel

== Awards ==
- Officer of the Order of Australia (AO) 1991
- Centenary Medal 2001

== See also ==
- Mathematics Genealogy Project
- Bright Spacs Biography entry
- Portrait — date unknown, St Andrews
- Portrait — date unknown, St Andrews
- Biography, St Andrews
- Obituary, Australian Mathematics Trust
- Obituary, Australian Academy of Technological Sciences and Engineering
- "Obituaries", Australian Academy of Science Newsletter, vol. 63, August–November 2005, pp. 10–11.
- E O Tuck, Obituary — Professor Renfrey Burnard Potts, The Adelaidean (October 2005).
- E O Tuck, Obituary : Renfrey B. Potts, 4/10/1925–9/8/2005, Austral. Math. Soc. Gaz. 32 (4) (2005), 291–292.
- E O Tuck, Retirement of Professor R. B. Potts, AO, Austral. Math. Soc. Gaz. 18 (4) (1991), 111–112.
- 2003 photo of Dr Barbara Kidman and Emeritus Professor Ren Potts, Adelaidean, Volume 12 Number 7 August 2003, pg14
- Biography of Renfrey Potts from the Institute for Operations Research and the Management Sciences
