= Mike Hendricks =

Australian cricketer (born 1942)

Personal information
- Full name: Michael Hendricks
- Born: 21 December 1942 (age 83); Corrimal, New South Wales, Australia
- Source: Cricinfo, 31 December 2016

Mike Hendricks (born 21 December 1942) is an Australian cricketer. He played 41 first-class and 9 List A matches for New South Wales and South Australia between the 1969/70 and 1974/75 seasons.

== See also ==
- List of New South Wales representative cricketers
- List of South Australian representative cricketers
