= Burnside Hospital =

Hospital in Adelaide, Australia

Coordinates: 34.9278°S 138.6386°E

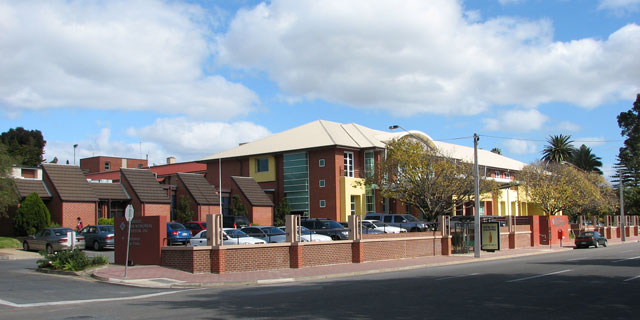
The hospital from Kensington Road.

Burnside Hospital, formerly Burnside War Memorial Hospital, is the only private community hospital in the City of Burnside, Adelaide, South Australia.

Burnside Council suggested building a community hospital in August 1943, as part of its Post-War Reconstruction and Development Committee; it was to cost 100,000 pounds and to remain as a memorial to honour Burnside's war dead. A local resident of Toorak Gardens, Otto George Ludwig von Rieben, offered his property, a mansion called Attunga, for use as a community hospital free of charge in 1944. In April 1949 the first conversion of Von Rieben's home was complete, and the hospital was caring for 21 patients. The hospital closed for a month in 1956 and when it reopened was given the name Burnside War Memorial Hospital. By then it had cared for over 1,400 patients.
