= Rose Park Primary School =

Location
- Alexandra Ave; Rose Park, South Australia; Australia
- Coordinates: 34.9316°S 138.6289°E

Information
- Type: Public
- Motto: Latin: Vincit Qui Se Vincit; He conquers who conquers himself
- Established: 1893
- Principal: Di Burrell
- Enrolment: Approximately 580
- Campus: Suburban
- Colours: Blue and gold
- Website: www.roseparkps.sa.edu.au

Rose Park Primary School is a coeducational R–6 school (5- to 12-year-olds) located in the Adelaide inner suburb of Rose Park. The school is located at 54 Alexandra Avenue and occupies the land between Alexandra and Grant Avenues. It is one of South Australia's earliest established Primary Schools and currently has an enrolment of approximately 580 students who come from different cultural backgrounds.

== History ==
The school is named after the Right Hon. Sir John Rose, who was the chairman of the South Australia Company at the time it subdivided the district. The land was purchased for £800 in 1892, and the original building was planned to accommodate 500 children. The original school building comprised seven classrooms with verandahs and two shelter sheds at the back.

The school was opened on 30 January 1893 with C A Wittber Headmaster, 4 assistants and 294 pupils. By the end of the year, 591 children had enrolled. The eastern wing was built in 1899, to provide a total of 9 classrooms. The verandahs at the back were removed and a large classroom was added on each of the eastern and western corners. The Grant Avenue building was completed in 1923, and extensive alterations were carried out during 1977 to make it suitable for contemporary teaching methods.

The old St. Theodore's Church was purchased in 1924 for £925 and was opened as a woodwork centre in 1925. The building has served a number of roles such as a drama area, creative dance area and even as a lunch-time recreational area supervised by a roster of parents.

After the opening of Linden Park Primary School, student numbers gradually declined, levelling off at around 400. Developments in the buildings since the 1950s have related to curriculum changes, rather than to pressures of numbers. Thus, the Grant Avenue building was remodelled as an Open Unit, in 1977 and subsequently re-divided in 1981. A strong library/resource centre developed, with particular space requirements. Activity rooms were set aside from ordinary classrooms for multi-purpose usage, assemblies, music, dance and drama and wet-weather activities.

Since 1970 the school grounds have been expanded by the purchase of two properties adjoining the school on the east, three properties on Grant Avenue and the take-away shop on the corner of Alexandra Avenue and Victoria Terrace, previously known as Gurney Road. The closure of Victoria Terrace to through traffic in 1976 and the development of the park helped to reduce crowding. The 1989 re-routing of the service lane enabled the final linking up of the original school with the church building and the shop block. Adjoining houses east of the school on Grant Avenue were demolished and the two sites developed to form the "block" currently used for after-school sport.

1993 was the Centenary Year of the school and celebrations were held throughout the year.

== Headmaster / principal ==
Name	Years	Notes
C.A. Wittber	1893–1906	
R. Llewellyn	1907–1910	
E.W. Gallagher	1911	
F.L. Gratton	1912	Locum for Gallagher
A.T. Drake	1913–1915	
C.E. Hamence	1916–1918	
F.N. Leak	1919	
T.S. Bosch	1920	
F.N. Leak	1921–1930	
R.J. Morgan	1931–1936	
C.R. Butterworth	1937	
W.S. Hutley	1938–1941	
W.R. G. Sharp	1942–1950	
A.C. Cattle	1951–1953	
A.R. Francis	1954–1956	
E.C.W. Priest	1957–1960	
E. Daenke	1961–1963	
R.D. Brown	1964	
G.J. Walker	1965–1967	
M.A. Byass	1968–1970	
W.R. Tresize	1971–1977	
D.K. Tassell	1978–1983	
T. Boreham	1984–1990	
G.J. Percy	1991	Acting 3 months
J.R. Turner	1991 – Jan 2000	
?	2000	
K. Spencer	2001 – Aug 2002	
D. Folber	Oct 2002 – April 2004	Acting
T. McLeod	April 2004 – Sept 2006	
K. Cotter	October 2006 – July 2007	Acting
J. Chinnery	July 2007 – October 2007	Acting
Brett Darcy	2008 – June 2016	
Rebecca Patterson	June–December 2016	Acting
Di Burrell	2017	
Rebecca Weber (née Patterson)	2019	

== Present day ==
Rose Park Primary School has an enrolment of approximately 580 students in 24 classes from Reception to Year 6. About 15% are School Card Holders, who are exempt from some school and associated fees. Classes are arranged in composite year groupings.

== Old Scholars Association ==
An Old Scholars' Association meets periodically and holds a reunion each year in October. Old Scholars maintain an archival collection; the archives provide a history of the school since its inception.

== Notable students ==
Name	Years attended	Notes
Frank Fenner	1920–1926	Professor of Microbiology at the John Curtin School of Medical Research between 1949 and 1967. Awarded the Copley Medal in 1995. Awarded the Prime Minister's Award for Science in 2002.
John Dowie	1921–1924	Australian painter, sculptor and writer. Member of the Order of Australia in 1981.
Renfrey Potts	1930–1936	Rhodes Scholar. Developed the Potts model. Professor, Chair and lecturer of applied mathematics at the University of Adelaide 1959–1990. Officer of the Order of Australia 1991. ANZIAM Medal 1995.
