= Rose Park, South Australia =

Rose Park
- Suburb
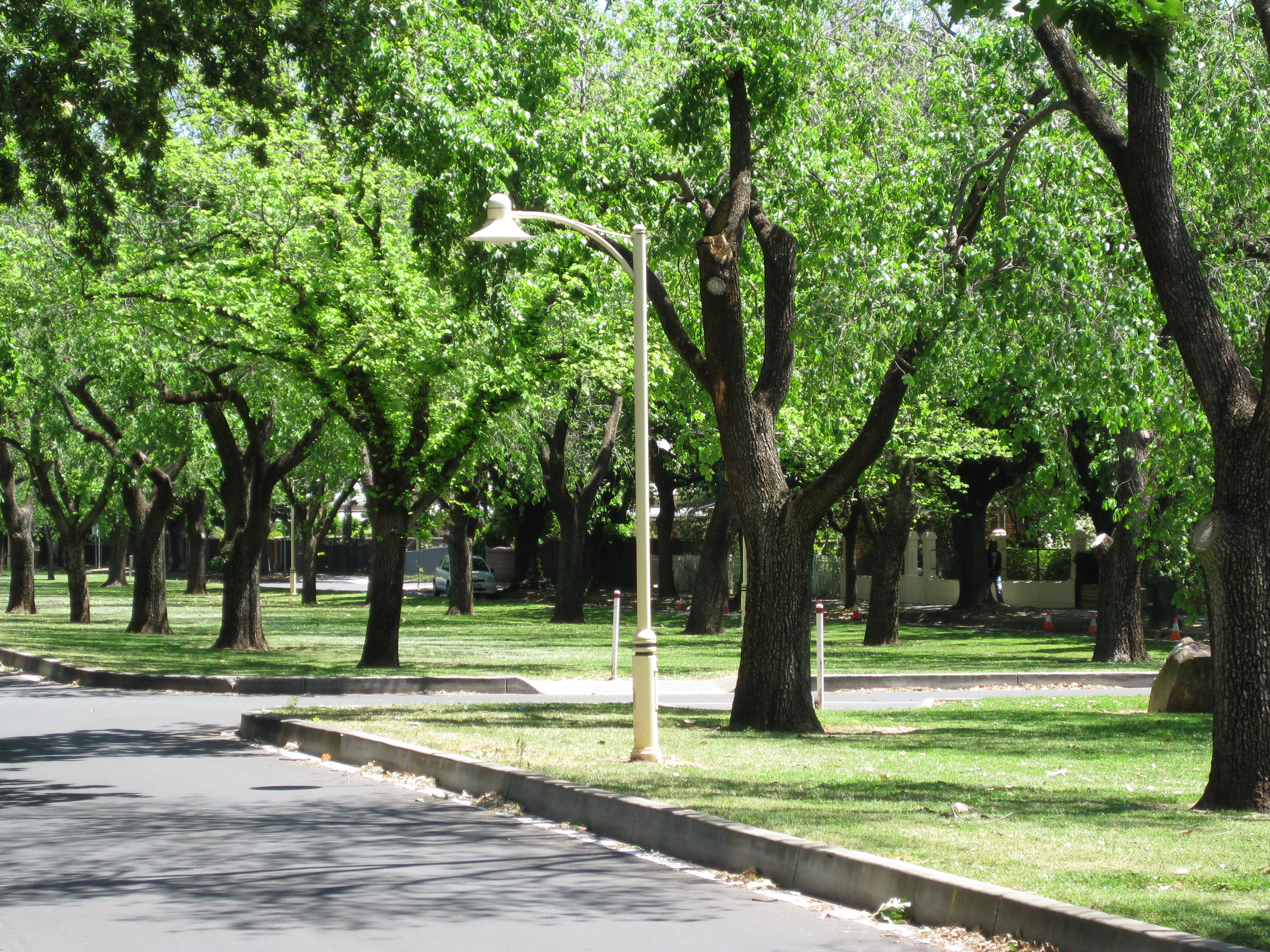
- Alexandra Avenue, Rose Park

- Country: Australia
- State: South Australia
- City: Adelaide
- LGA: City of Burnside
- Established: 1878

Government
  - State electorate: Bragg (2022 - present) Dunstan (2018 - 2021) Bragg (1970 - 2017)
  - Federal division: Sturt

Population
  - Total: 1,375 (SAL 2021)
- Postcode: 5067
Suburbs around Rose Park
Kent Town	Norwood	Norwood
Adelaide; Parklands	Rose Park	Toorak Gardens
Adelaide; Parklands	Dulwich	Toorak Gardens & Dulwich

Rose Park is a suburb in the South Australian capital city of Adelaide. It is located 1 kilometre (0.62 mi) east of Adelaide's central business district. Rose Park is a leafy, tree-lined and wealthy inner suburb containing a number of historical and contemporary attractions. Much of the area's 19th-century housing stock has been recognised with heritage protection.

Part of the Burnside Council, it is bounded to the north by Kensington Road, to the east by Prescott Terrace, to the south by Dulwich Avenue and to the west by Fullarton Road. The area is mainly residential in nature, with commercial buildings along Fullarton Road, Kensington Road, and Dulwich Avenue. This places it on the very edge of the Adelaide Park Lands, bordering Victoria Park.

== History ==
Laid out in 1878 on part section 262, Hundred of Adelaide by the South Australia Company. Named after Sir John Rose, chairman of the company for fourteen years in the latter half of the nineteenth century. Rose Park Post Office opened on 1 October 1946 but was renamed Norwood South in 1966.

== Heritage-listed buildings ==
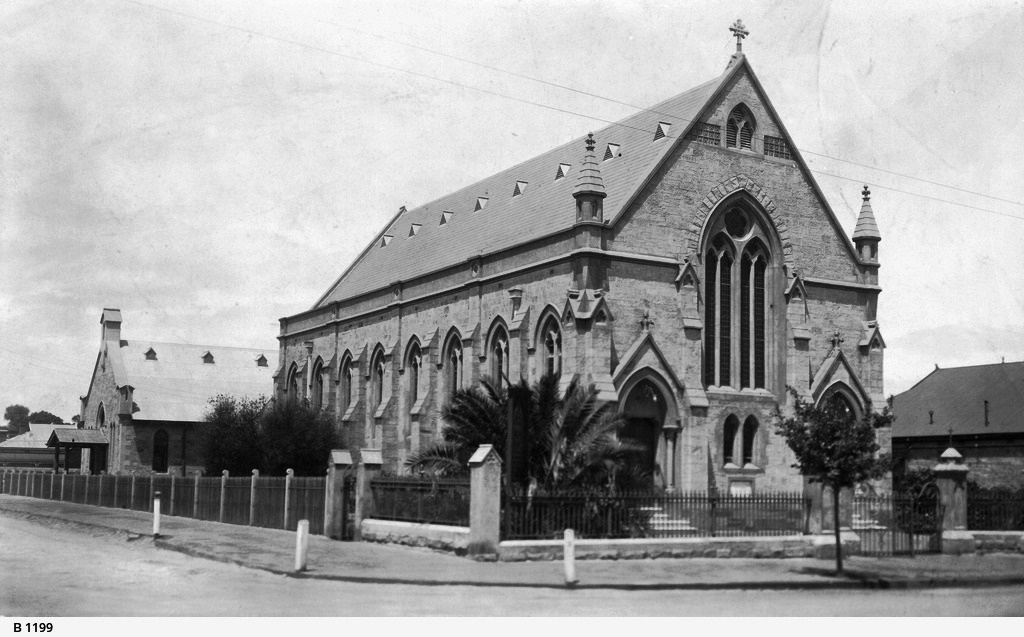
Gartrell Memorial Church, February 1923

The Gartrell Memorial Church, located on Prescott Terrace between Alexandra and Grant Avenues, was designed in 1914 by architect Herbert Jory in the Gothic Revival style when he was in the architectural practice of Woods, Bagot & Jory, and built as a Methodist church in 1915. Jory also designed the Gartrell Memorial Schoolroom. The church and its hall were state heritage-listed in November 1989, with the hall estimated to be built at a later date, probably c.1925.

The church was named after James Gartrell, who was a parishioner and benefactor. He contributed generously to its building and paid for the pipe organ.

== Demographics ==
In the 2016 census, the population of the Rose Park was 1,374 people. This compares with 2,663 in 2001 (when the census area included adjoining Dulwich) with a very slight decrease in population between the 1996 and 2001 censuses. In the 2006 census, the population of the Rose Park (without Dulwich) was 1,293 people.

In 2016 there were 352 families in 615 private dwellings, with a median weekly household income of A$2,060.

== Notable people ==
- Olympia Aldersey, rower
- Marie Brown, doctor and activist
- Jim Deane, Australian rules footballer
- Andrew Fairweather, mine manager
- Dorothy Kell Finnis, physiotherapist
- John Gardner, politician
- Albert Gillespie, cricketer and Royal Air Force officer
- Heidi Girolamo, politician
- Molly Goodman, rower
- William Humphrey Harvey, politician
- William Thornborough Hayward, doctor
- Paul Hetherington, poet
- Ray McArthur, Australian rules footballer
- Kevin McCarthy, cricketer
- James Moseley, politician
- Barry Norsworthy, Australian rules footballer
- Mary Anstie Overbury, artist and teacher
- Joshua Palmer, swimmer
- Frank Potter, politician
- Leila Rankine, Aboriginal community worker and musician
- William Sandover, hotelier and politician
- Brian Seidel, painter
- James Stevens, politician
- Adrien Sturt, basketballer
- Vincent Tarzia, politician, former South Australian Leader of the Opposition
- Jim Toohey, politician
- James Troisi, soccer player
- Dean Trowse, cricketer

== Education ==
Rose Park Primary School is located in Rose Park. The Adelaide Japanese Community School, Inc. (ACJS; アデレード日本語補習授業校 Aderēdo Nihongo Hoshū Jugyō Kō), a part-time Japanese educational programme, holds its classes in Rose Park Primary School.

== Politics ==
Rose Park is part of the state electoral district of Bragg, which has been held by Jack Batty since the 2022 Bragg state by-election. The suburb briefly formed part of the electoral district of Dunstan and was represented by South Australian Premier Steven Marshall during this time.

In federal politics, the suburb has been part of the Division of Sturt since 20 July 2018, and has been represented by Labor MP Claire Clutterham since the 2025 election. Rose Park was formerly in the division of Adelaide and was represented by Labor MP Kate Ellis from 2004 until her retirement in 2019.
