= Glover Playgrounds =

Playground in North Adelaide, South Australia

The Glover Playgrounds are three playgrounds in the Adelaide Park Lands in Adelaide, South Australia. They were established by Charles Glover, a Lord Mayor of Adelaide and a philanthropist. Despite maps to the contrary he had no relationship with the West Terrace playground.

== South Terrace, Adelaide ==
The playground in Park 20 on South Terrace near Pulteney Street was established in 1918. The original shelter shed is still present. Its coordinates are 34.935762°S 138.604707°E

== LeFevre Terrace, North Adelaide ==
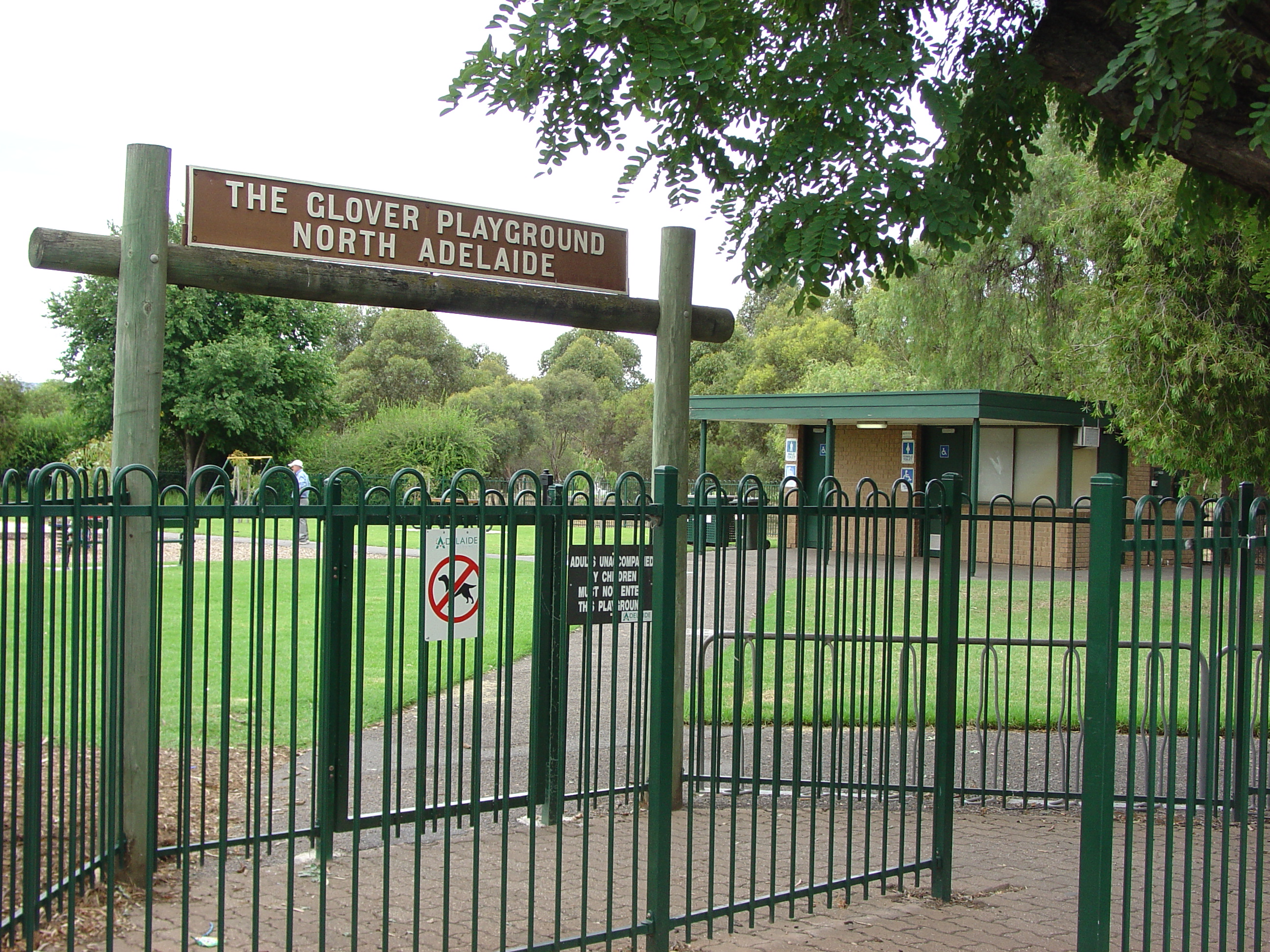
Entrance to LeFevre Terrace playground

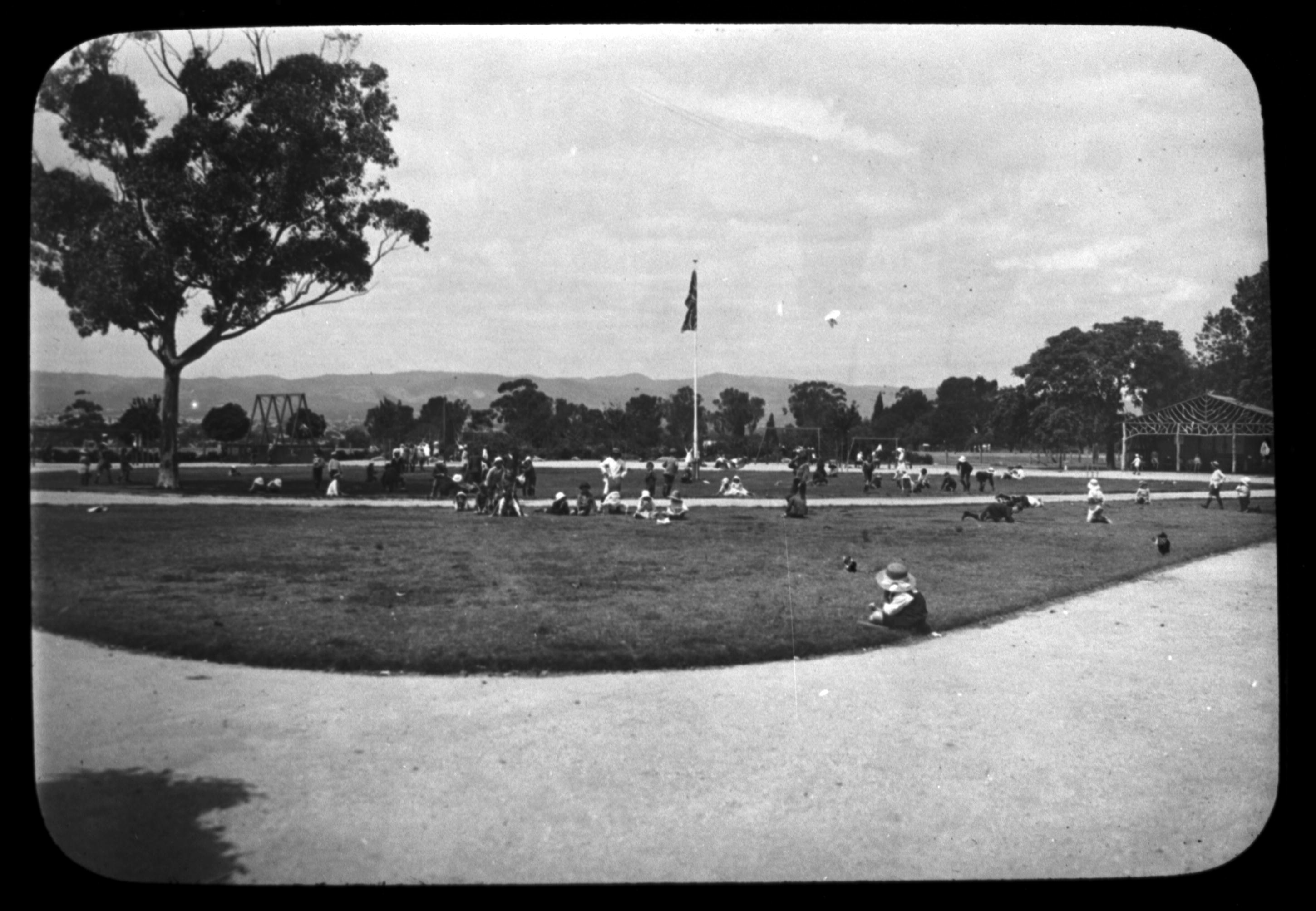
LeFevre Terrace Playground in 1922 showing children playing, shelter shed, swings and dominated by a large gum tree

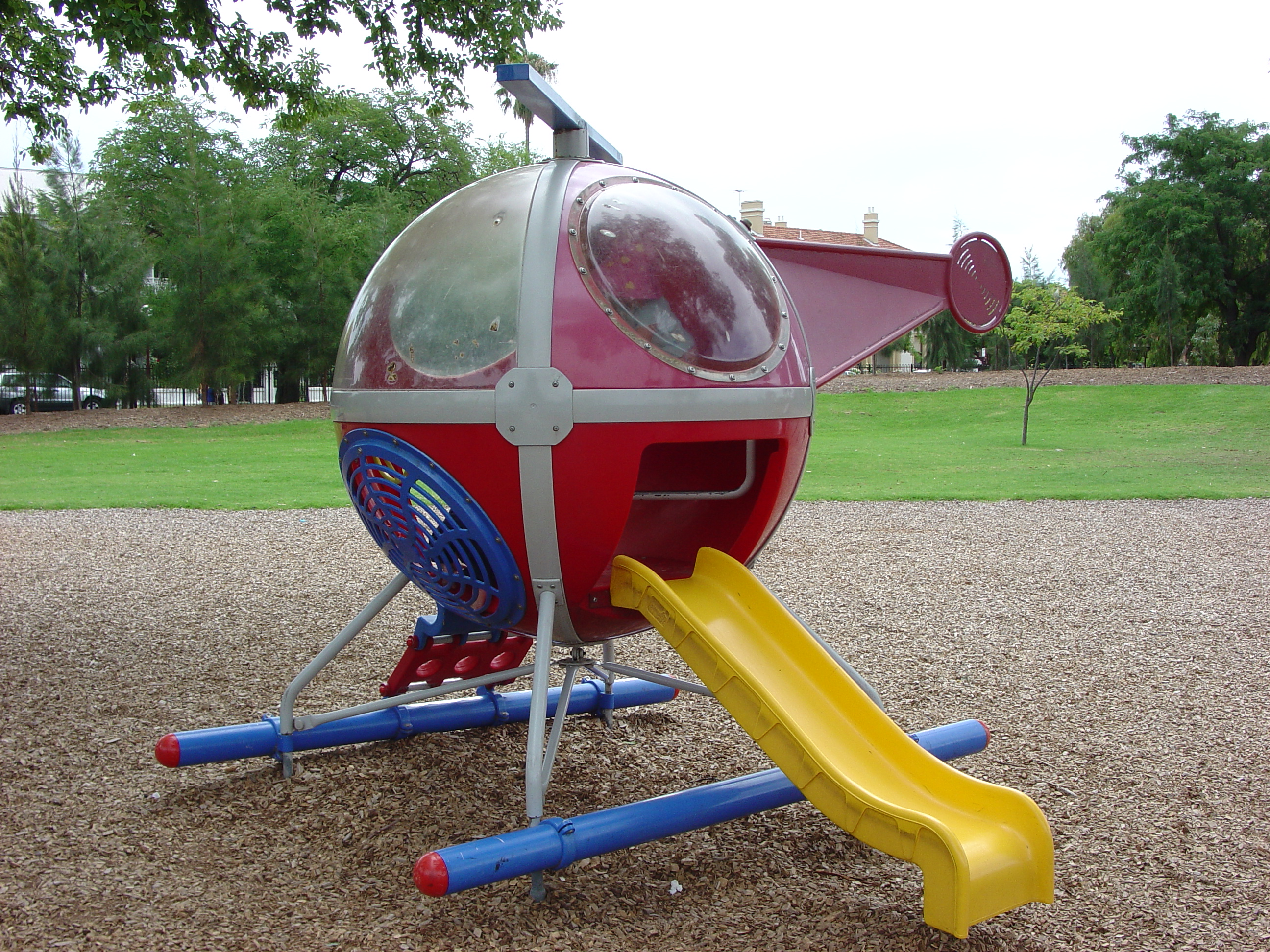
Helicopter, LeFevre Terrace playground

The playground in Park 6 on LeFevre Terrace opposite the corner with Tynte Street was established in 1920 with a donation of £500 from Glover. It is locally known as the helicopter playground after one of the current pieces of equipment.

On 2 November 2014, a "Little Library for Little People in a Little Park" was established, which is a small free library for book-swapping. The books are all aimed for children using the playground or nearby. The library was set up by a trio of volunteers (Julia Blanka, Valdis Dunis and Viviana Waller) with support from the Adelaide City Council, and is affiliated with the Little Free Library organization.

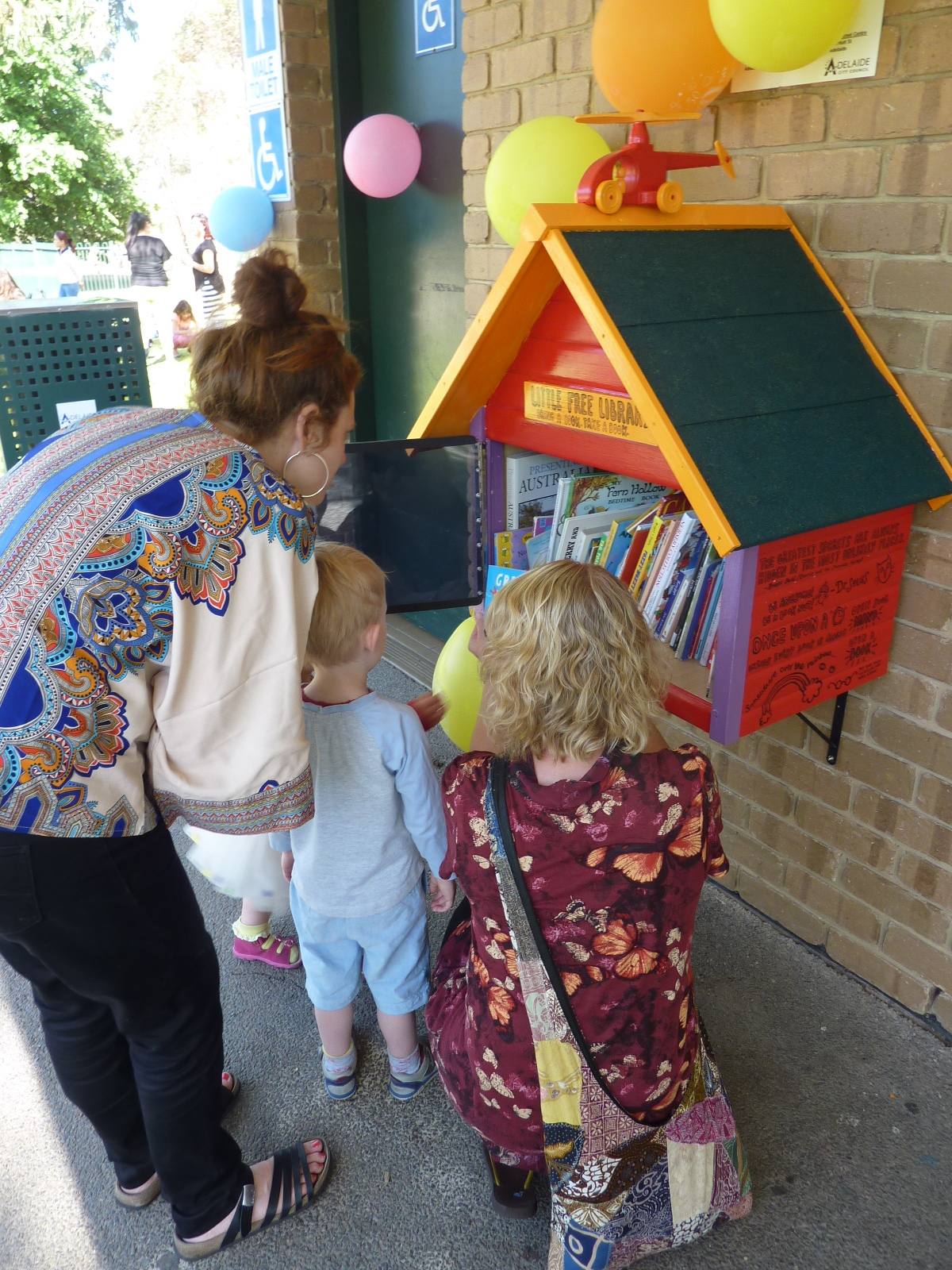
Little Library on opening day

The playground has electric barbecues, picnic tables and toilets as well as playground equipment.

The toilet block contains a kiosk, now closed. Its co-ordinates are 34.904625°S 138.60069°E

== East Terrace, Adelaide ==
The playground in Park 15 on East Terrace, near the corner with Wakefield Street, was established in 1925 . The original shelter shed is still present. Its co-ordinates are 34.927326°S 138.614415°E
