= Adelaide Park Lands =

Parks in Adelaide, South Australia

Coordinates: 34.9°S 138.6°E

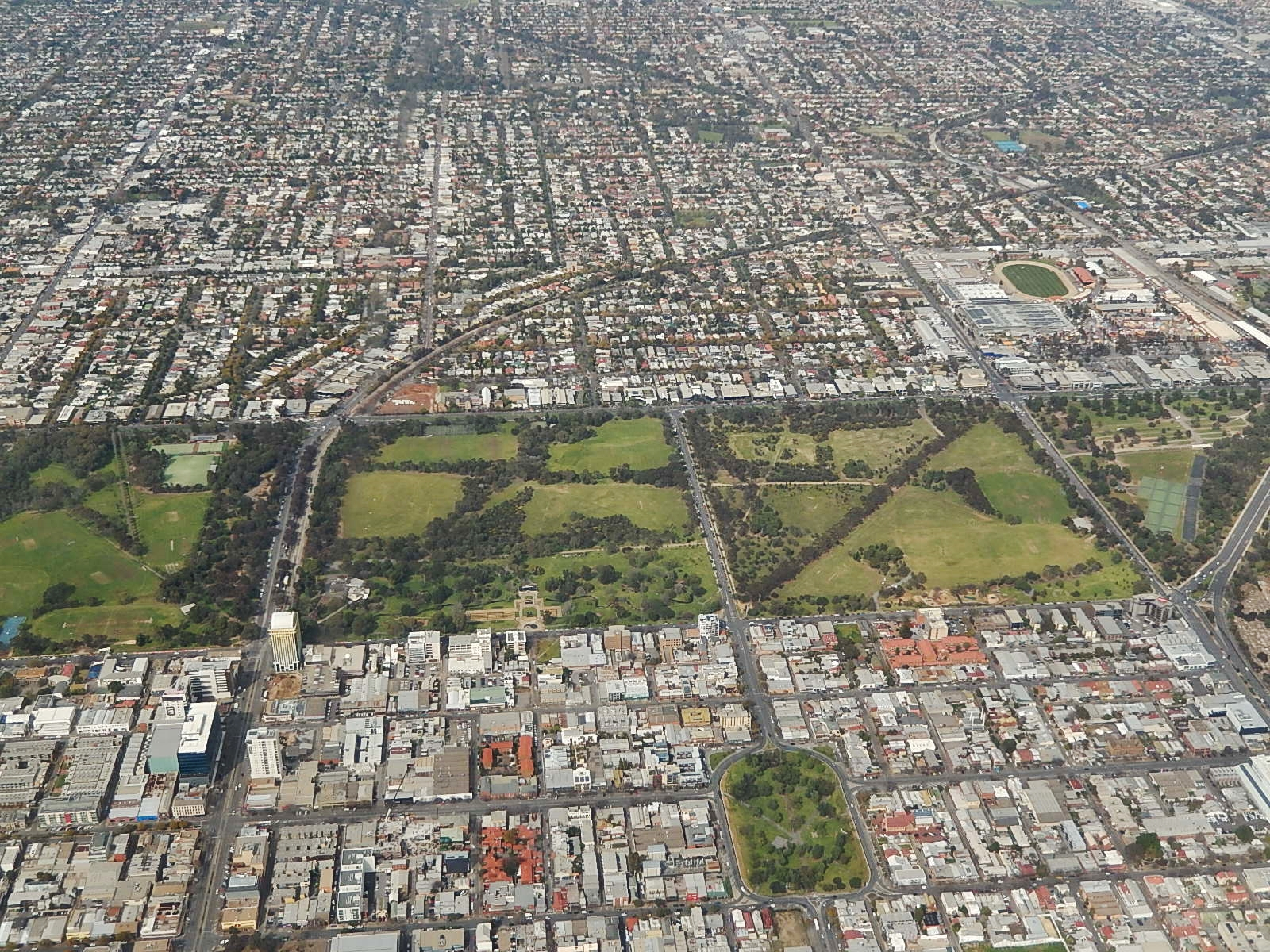
Aerial view of South Park Lands showing Parks 20, 21, 22 and Whitmore Square in the lower right.

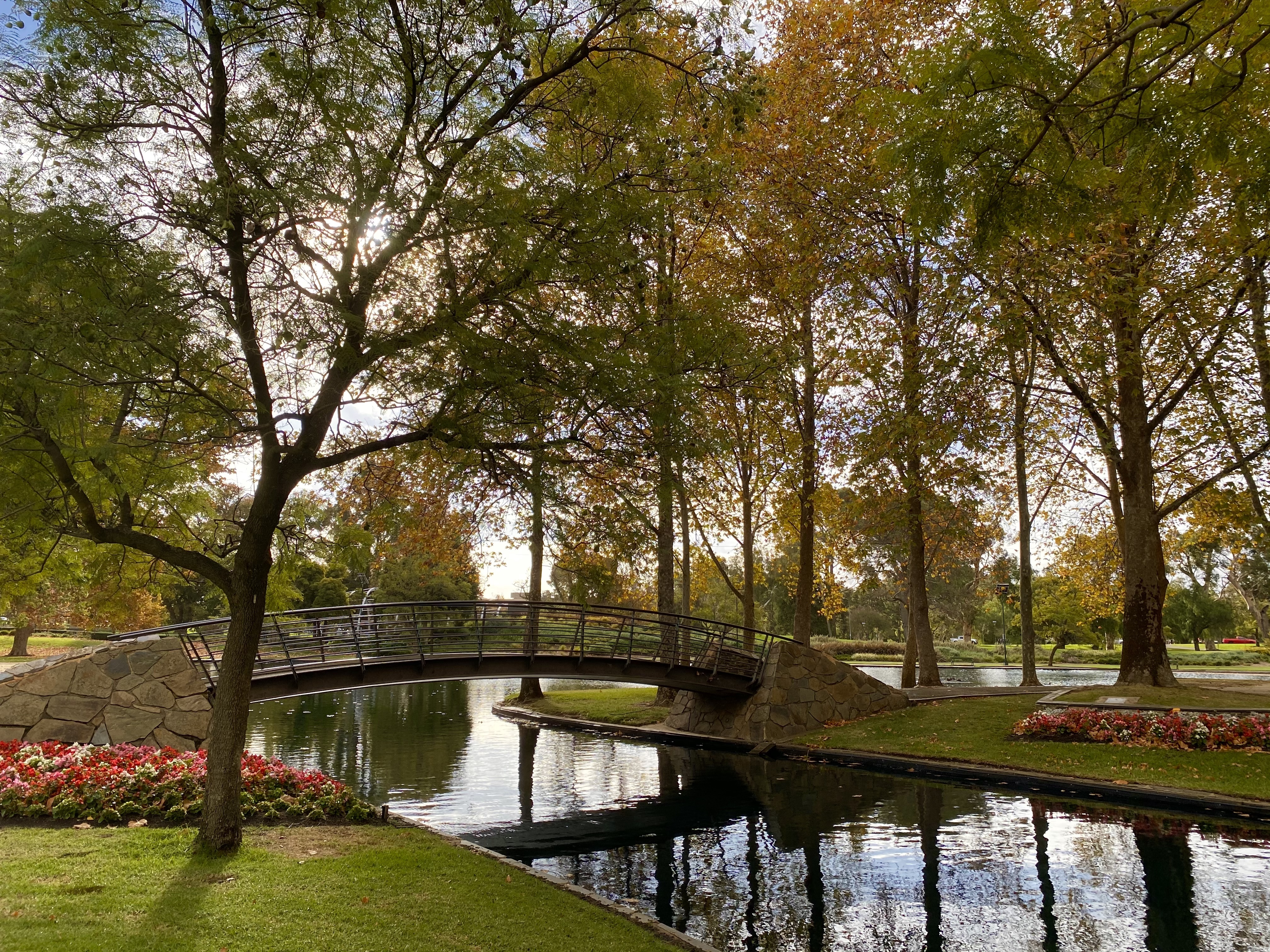
Rymill Park / Murlawirrapurka (Park 14), a popular part of the Park Lands

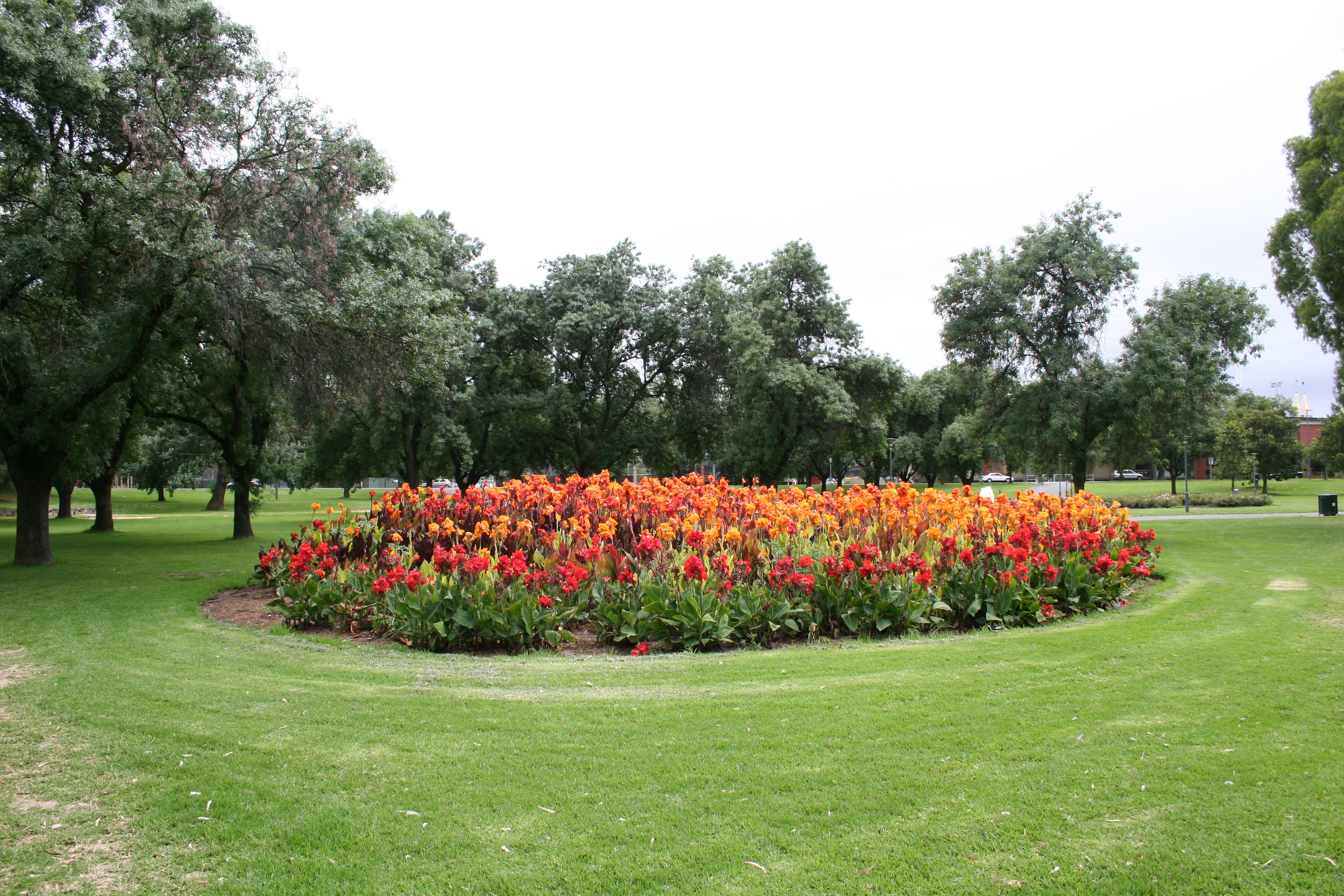
Flower bed in Pinky Flat / Tarntanya Wama (Park 26)

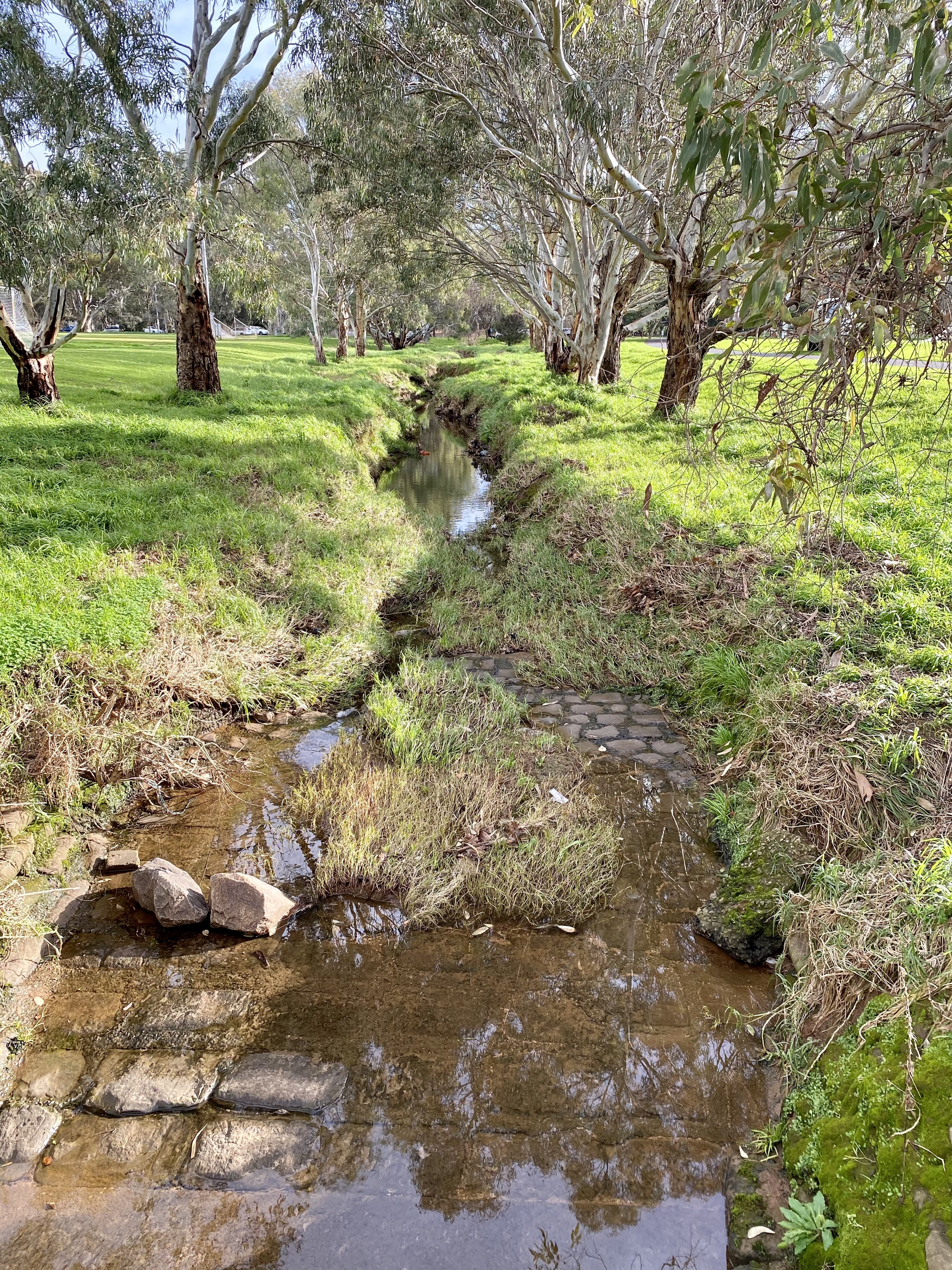
Gum trees and a creek in Park 20

The Adelaide Park Lands are a green belt forming a figure-eight configuration of open space on both banks of the River Torrens between Hackney and Thebarton, which encloses and separates the City of Adelaide area (including both the Adelaide city centre and North Adelaide) from the surrounding suburbia of greater metropolitan Adelaide, the capital city of South Australia. They were laid out by Colonel William Light in his design for the city, and originally consisted of 2,300 acres (930 ha) "exclusive of 32 acres (13 ha) for a public cemetery". One copy of Light's plan shows areas for a cemetery and a Post and Telegraph Store on West Terrace, a small Government Domain and Barracks on the central part of North Terrace, a hospital on East Terrace, a Botanical Garden on the River Torrens west of North Adelaide, and a school and a storehouse south-west of North Adelaide.

Over the years there has been constant encroachment on the Park Lands by the state government and others. Soon after their declaration in 1837, 370 acres (150 ha) "were lost to 'Government Reserves'". In 1902, The Herald noted that a total area of 489 acres (198 ha) had been taken from park lands. In 2018, the loss is about 568 acres (230 ha). The part of the Park Lands not in the "Government Reserves" have been managed and maintained by the Adelaide City Council since 1852, and since February 2007, the Adelaide Park Lands Authority has advised council and government.

On 7 November 2008 the Federal Minister for Environment, Heritage and the Arts, Peter Garrett, announced that the Adelaide Park Lands had been entered in the Australian National Heritage List as "an enduring treasure for the people of South Australia and the nation as a whole". In fact, large areas of the Adelaide Park Lands along the north side of the complete length of North Tce, and along the north side of Port Road from West Terrace to the Thebarton Police Barracks, (in Parks 11, 12, 26 and 27), and also the rail reserves, (in Parks 25, 26 and 27), were excluded from the "Adelaide Park Lands and City Layout National Heritage Place" listing.

== History ==
Adelaide is a planned city, and the Adelaide Park Lands are an integral part of Colonel William Light's 1837 plan. Light chose a site spanning the River Torrens (known as Yatala by the Kaurna people), and planned the city to fit the topography of the landscape, "on rising ground".

The Emigration Regulations appearing in the South Australian Gazette and Colonial Register published in London on 18 June 1836 instructed that the site of the first town be divided into 1,000 sections of an acre each.

In early 1837, William Light proposed to the Resident Commissioner James Hurtle Fisher that the figure-eight of open space, which Light later referred to as "Adelaide Park", be reserved as "Park grounds". Light drew up a plan that included 700 acres (2.8 km^{2}) south of the River Torrens and 342 acres (1.38 km^{2}) north of the river. In addition, he included 38 acres (0.15 km^{2}) of city squares: Hindmarsh, Hurtle, Light, Whitmore and Wellington Squares (each comprising six acres), Victoria Square (eight acres), four one-acre Public Reserves (with frontages to Victoria Square), and 2,300 acres (9.3 km^{2}) for the Park Lands.

Adelaide's characteristic geometrical grid pattern is not unique: apart from earlier precedents going back to ancient Greece, it follows part of a series of rules created by Spanish planners for their colonial cities, known as the "Law of the Indies". They included the grid pattern with a main thoroughfare, centred around a main square. There are many historical precedents for five squares, including Philadelphia in America, designed in 1682 by surveyor Thomas Holme. There are however no records showing that Light deliberately copied any cities or rules for planning.

In 1838 the Colonization Commissioners for South Australia authorised South Australia's Resident Commissioner to purchase the Adelaide Park Lands, and these instructions were carried out in 1839.

By 1839 the Park Lands were threatened by extensive timber cutting, rubbish dumping, brick-making, quarrying, squatting, and grazing. To check this, a body of special constables was instituted on 9 October 1839 by George Gawler and Superintendent Henry Inman. Inman appointed Nick Boys Bull (c. 1800-1846), formerly a police sub-inspector, as Keeper of the Park Lands. Bull led an initial team of six park rangers, most being convalescent migrants thrown on government support. This dropped to two by 1840, then back to four by June 1841. Pay and rations were provided by the police department.

Since 1852, the areas of the Park Lands placed in the custodianship of the municipal corporation have been managed and maintained by the Adelaide City Council. Public use of the Park Lands was controlled by a ranger who patrolled the parks, regulating sporting and recreational activities in the parks and supervising the depasturing of stock grazing there.

Rifle butts were established in the South Park Lands in 1860 for training the volunteer military force. On 6 June 1877, a deputation including the mayor of Unley and councillor William Shierlaw asked Chief Secretary Sir Henry Ayers to have them removed, citing danger to passing members of the public and increased traffic expected from a new road connecting Unley with King William Street. The rifle range was closed in early 1878 and relocated to a site near Dry Creek railway station.

A variety of now absent wildlife was still present in the Park Lands in the late 1800s, with the Greater Bilby reported as still being numerous in 1890. The former prevalence of the species - which went by the local name of pinky or pingku - is recognised as the likely origin of the place name Pinky Flat. The once abundant species was presumed completely extinct in the wild in South Australia by 1930.

The Park Lands saw development during the 19th Century, for example the Adelaide Botanic Garden, hospital, South Australian Institute, Adelaide Oval, Victoria Park Racecourse. Extensive felling of trees, quarrying and dumping of rubbish continued, which combined to give the Park Lands an unsightly appearance. In the late 19th century John Ednie Brown, the government's Conservator of Forests, was commissioned by the City Council to prepare a blueprint for the beautification of the Park Lands. Brown presented his Report in 1880, but it was not acted upon until the turn of the 20th century when A.W. Pelzer became the City Gardener. Major progress was made in planting and landscaping the Park Lands during his tenure (1899–1932) and further improvements such as creation of new gardens and boating lakes were carried under the authority of William Veale, the Town Clerk (1947–1965).

In July 2007 part of the Adelaide Park Lands and City of Adelaide layout (North and South Adelaide) were granted National Heritage Listing status. The first remarks on the assessor's report were: "The Adelaide Park Lands and City Layout is a significant example of early colonial planning which has retained key elements of its historical layout for over one hundred and seventy years. The 1837 Adelaide Plan attributed to Colonel William Light and the establishment of Adelaide marks a significant turning point in the settlement of Australia."

== Park Lands today ==
In the 2010s, about 25% of the Park Lands are the location of government, public and cultural buildings. Of the remaining approximately 700 hectares (1,700 acres), many parts have been sculpted into planned gardens and playing fields. Some of the remainder is remnant or regenerated Adelaide Plains grasslands or grassy woodlands, of which 230 hectares (570 acres) have been designated and developed by the city council as areas for native fauna and flora. Developments in the early 2000s focused on maintenance and upgrading of recreational facilities, and removal of remnant grasslands and open grassy woodlands, particularly through urbanisation and the Greening of Adelaide tree planting and replacement programs.

In the early 2000s there were proposals to redevelop Park16 (Victoria Park), with the construction of a grandstand to cater for the Clipsal 500 and horse racing events. Due to lobbying by local resident groups, the Adelaide Park Lands Preservation Association, the media and many residents of greater Adelaide, this plan was eventually rejected by the Adelaide City Council and subsequently no longer pursued by the South Australian Government.

In December 2006 the state government passed the Adelaide Park Lands Act 2005, which established the Adelaide Park Lands Authority and a series of statutory protections for the Park Lands. At the time the Act was proclaimed, Premier Mike Rann announced that a major return of alienated Park Lands would be made at the western edge of the city. The area to be returned, 5.5 hectares of land at the west end of Park 25, occupied since 1879 by the Thebarton Water Depot, lies between East Terrace (now James Congdon Drive), Port Road and the railway lines. The plans were unveiled in 2011 and the land, which was mallee box woodland prior to European settlement, was developed and landscaped with more than 23,000 trees and shrubs as an urban forest. It features indigenous species, including native pine. In 2017–2018, land at the east end of Park 25 has been used by the South Australian Cricket Association for the development of the Karen Rolton Oval and associated facilities including car parking.

== Parks ==
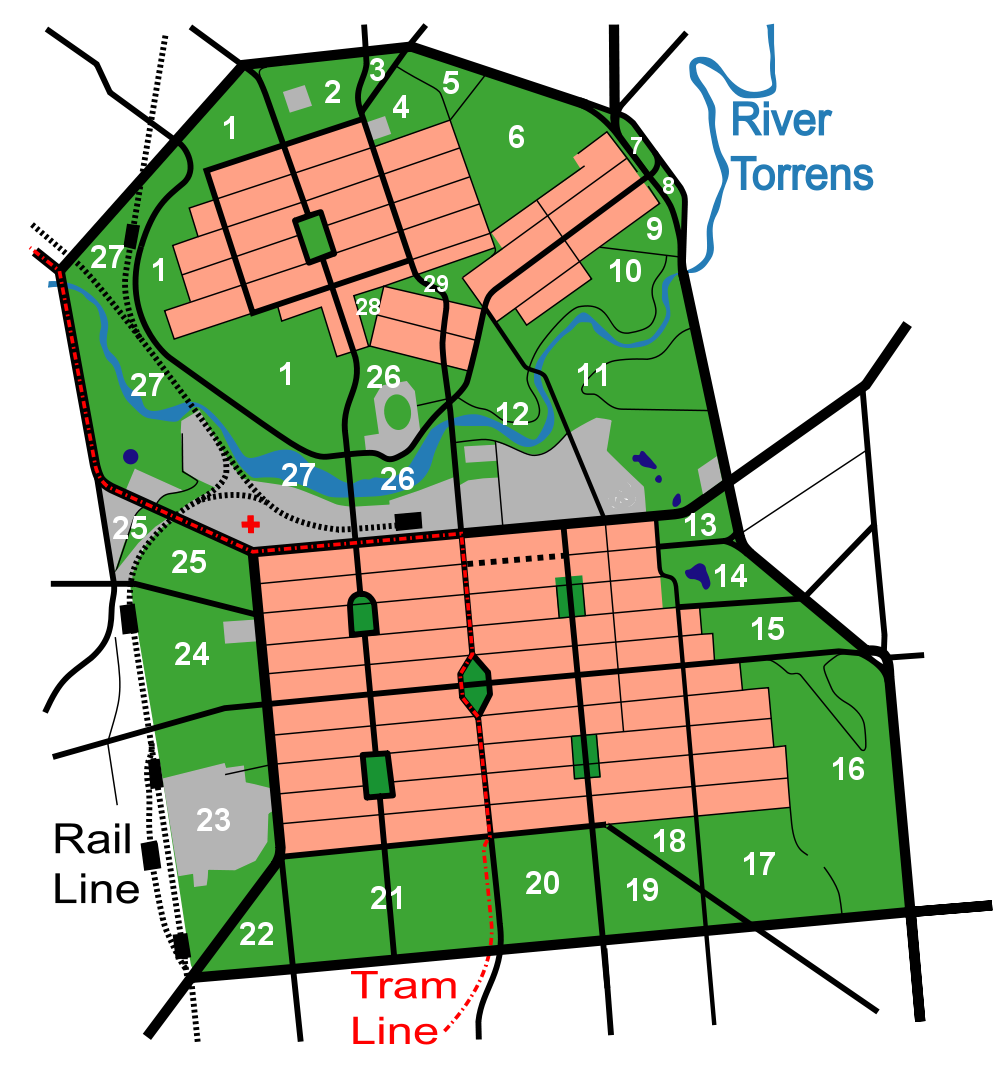
Adelaide and North Adelaide are surrounded by the Park Lands, divided into 29 numbered parks. Town acres are shown in pink, open park land in green, and built-up areas of park land in grey.

Although it is a single park, for management purposes the Adelaide City Council has used the last two digits of survey sections as labels to identify smaller areas within the Adelaide Park Lands. In some, but not all, cases, roadways crossing over the Park Lands coincide with the survey section boundaries that gave rise to council's numbering (from "Park 1" to "Park 29"). The numbering, which starts in the North Park Lands (at the Adelaide Golf Links), and increases clockwise around the perimeter, was applied in September 1882.

Some of the parks are more commonly known by a commemorative name (e.g. Rymill Park), but others, such as Park 10, are still known mostly by their number.

=== Dual naming ===
Since the Adelaide City Council drew up a Reconciliation Vision Statement in 1997, they committed to a dual naming project, working with Kaurna Warra Pintyanthi, a Kaurna language project run by the University of Adelaide in collaboration with Kaurna advisors. The dual naming covers the city centre and North Adelaide, including the six public squares and Adelaide park lands. Erection of signs in each of the parks was completed on 30 June 2004, with some of the spellings being revised in the 2010s. Also at that time, the numbered parks that still had no English name were assigned one.

Victoria Square, in the centre of Adelaide city, is now also known as Tarntanyangga. All 29 Parks around the city have been assigned a Kaurna name, and the River Torrens is now also named Karrawirra Parri. The renaming of 39 sites was finalised and endorsed by the council in 2012. The full list of square and park names, along with meanings and pronunciations, is available on the Council website.

=== Park 1: Possum Park / Pirltawardli ===
Kaurna park name and translation: Pirltawardli "possum home" (Pirltawardli/Piltawodli – pilta = possum, and wodli = house or home). 76 hectares. The name of the site has in the past been spelt Pilta-wodli or Piltawodlingga (in KWP's New Spelling 2010, Pirltawardli and Pirltawardlingga).

Of an irregular shape, Possum Park / Pirltawardli wraps around the western end of North Adelaide in a vaguely crescent or banana shape. The southern and western boundaries are provided by War Memorial Drive, with Park 27 (which includes Bonython Park on the other side. The eastern boundary, from south to north, is formed by Montefiore Rd, the western end of North Adelaide (i.e. Strangways Terrace, Mills Tce and Barton Tce West) and Jeffcott Rd. The northern boundary is formed by Park Tce. It contains the Adelaide Golf Links.

==== Kaurna and missionary history ====
The history of Park 1 is bound up with that of Park 27 and Bonython Park, after a succession of Protectors of Aborigines first set up a "Native Location", of which elements moved between the north and south sides of the River Torrens.

Bromley's Camp, the first of these, was established in April 1837 on the south side of the river by Captain Walter Bromley, the second interim Protector. He initially pitched his tent in the vicinity of the old Adelaide Gaol, on land on or near the present Bonython Park (also known as the "Aborigines Location" and later as the "Old Location").

After a few weeks, Bromley moved camp to the north side of the river at the request of the Kaurna people, to the site known as Piltawodli (later revised to Pirltawardli), meaning "possum place" and also known as the "Aboriginal Location". It was probably a campsite used by the Kaurna, and may have had some importance for ceremonies. This site is now within the area of the Par 3 golf course adjoining the North Adelaide Golf Links, and is marked by a memorial plaque at the carpark by the weir, erected on 26 May 2000.

Pirltawodli was designed by the colonial government to keep Aboriginal people confined and settled in a type of reserve, so that the rest of the land could be systematically colonised. However, it became very important for the history and later study of the Kaurna language.

In October 1838 two German missionaries, Christian Teichelmann and Clamor Schürmann (and later Samuel Klose) arrived, setting themselves first up at the "Old Location" on the southern side, studying the Kaurna language and teaching in that language. This was the first mission in South Australia. In December 1839 Schürmann opened a school, supported by Governor George Gawler, which taught only in the Kaurna language, teaching the children to read and write in their language.

In 1839 the school was moved across to the north side of the river to Pirltawardli. In August 1840, Klose took over the running of the school. The second interim Protector (1837–1839), William Wyatt was also involved in the running of the school and was a frequent visitor to Pirltawardli.

In the 1840s, Pirltawardli comprised a fenced area of 5.7 hectares (14 acres). However the whole site, including the school, was dismantled in July 1845, on the orders of Governor George Grey, who thought it best to take the children away from their parents, and a new "Native School" run by the government, which taught only in English, was established near what is now Kintore Avenue. The people's houses were destroyed by soldiers. (The Native School closed in 1851, with the remaining children taken to Poonindie Mission at Port Lincoln on the Eyre Peninsula).

A few people continued to camp near the house of Klose, the only remaining missionary, at Pirltawardli. In 1846 the government build some brick sheds in part of this area, and also across the river behind the new Adelaide Gaol. One was for the "Murray tribe", who had moved to the area, and a smaller number of sheds for what was left of the "Adelaide tribe".

==== Significance of Pirltawardli ====
Pirltawardli is still of great significance to Kaurna people, as well as non-Indigenous South Australians. Nearly all of the recorded language and early written records of Kaurna culture stem from this place, documented by the missionaries, who also shared their views on race relations in the new colony. The linguistic work of Teichelmann and Schürmann there had far-reaching effects, influencing later missionaries to teach in local languages, aiding the work of linguists, and laying the foundations for the 21st-century language revival of the Kaurna and also indirectly helping in the revival of other languages, after other missionaries and linguists had followed their example with other local languages.

==== Records ====
Apart from the missionaries, other Europeans such as William Wyatt, William Williams, William Cawthorne and Matthew Moorhouse wrote about the "Adelaide Tribe" in their memoirs.

William Williams was keeper of the Colonial Store at nearby Tininyawardli (or Tinninyawodli), which was just south of where Strangways Terrace was built. He published a list of 377 Kaurna words, published in the Southern Australian on 15 May 1839 and republished in the South Australian Colonist in the following year.

William Cawthorne, a frequent visitor and close friend of Kadlitpina ("Captain Jack"), loved the Kaurna Palti "corroboree" and their material culture, and was responsible for recording many names of artefacts. His Rough Notes on the Manners and Customs of the Natives, written in 1844, was published in the 1925-26 Proceedings of the Royal Geographical Society of Australasia (SA Branch).

Moorhouse, Protector from 1839 until 1857, lived at Pirltawardli and worked closely with the missionaries. There is only one remaining page of his diary, containing several Kaurna songlines not recorded elsewhere, but much information has been gleaned from his reports and official correspondence.

==== Golf course re-development ====
A $45 million redevelopment of the golf course was announced by the state Malinauskas Labor Government in 2025, and faced significant community backlash in 2026 over the removal of 585 trees. Public servant Edwin Kemp Attrill and Kaurna Traditional Owner Janette Milera launched a Federal Court action to have the works referred to Federal Environment Minister Murray Watt for assessment. Attorney General Kyam Maher stated that Attrill and Milera could face over $4 million in damages, legal fees and other expenses, which the government would seek to claim if the action was unsuccessful.

=== Park 2: Denise Norton Park / Pardipardinyilla ===
Pardipardinyilla 'swimming place' 17 hectares Denise Norton was the first South Australian to represent Australia at the Olympic or Commonwealth Games – in the sport of swimming.

Approximately square, the park is bounded by Fitzroy Tce (to the north), Prospect Rd (to the east), Barton Tce West (to the south) and Jeffcott Rd (to the west).

The Park provides a range of formal and informal facilities for cricket, swimming, tennis and family picnics. The north-west corner of the Park contains the Adelaide Aquatic Centre, picnic facilities and the Bush Magic playground. The remainder of the Park includes sporting facilities, open space and vegetation (designed and semi-natural landscapes).

- The Adelaide Swimming Centre was relocated to this Park in 1968/9 to replace the old City Baths on the current site of the Festival Centre. It was renovated, enclosed and renamed Adelaide Aquatic Centre in 1985. It was renovated again in 1998.
- The Bush Magic Play Park was designed in 1988, and is important as a precedent for the contemporary generation of play spaces around the Park Lands and metropolitan Adelaide. It was the first play park in SA to incorporate wheelchair access.
- Sporting facilities, which are currently held under an annual licence to Blackfriars Priory School, include change rooms, five playing fields and four tennis courts. The licence covers an area of approximately 35% of the Park. The school has first right of use of these areas on weekday afternoons after school, and on Saturday mornings.

=== Park 3: Yam Daisy Park / Kantarilla ===
Kantarilla 'kandara root place' 3.3 hectares

A small triangle bounded by Prospect Rd (west), Fitzroy Tce (north) and Main North Rd (east).

Contains open park.

=== Park 4: Reservoir Park / Kangatilla ===
Kangatilla 'kangatta berry place' 9.4 hectares

Approximately pentagonal, bounded by O'Connell Street (west), Main North Road (north-west), Lefevre Road (north-east and east) and Barton Terrace East (south).

Contains open and wooded park, with SA Water facilities at the western end. The former Fitzroy Croquet Club was located in the northern corner of the Park, and there were two ovals in the middle of the Park. The main structure of the SA Water facilities is a State Heritage-listed earth-covered reservoir, dating from the 1870s, that stores and supplies water to Adelaide. Associated with this are a two-storey red brick pumping station, a small brick pumping station "heavily painted in Brunswick green", and an electricity sub-station.

=== Park 5: Bragg Park / Ngampa Yarta ===
Ngampa Yarta 'ngampa root ground' In the late 1800s, Nobel Prize winners and University of Adelaide academics Sir William Henry Bragg and his son, Sir William Lawrence Bragg, lived nearby.

Of irregular shape, the park is bounded by Robe Terrace (NE), Medindie Road (SE), Lefevre Road (W) and Main North Road (NW).

Contains two small ovals, surrounded by wooded park. There is also a Tree Planting Memorial, erected in 1982 by the North Adelaide Society, to recognise the community tree planting efforts in the locality.

=== Park 6: Lefevre Park / Nantu Wama ===
Nantu Wama 'horse plain' or 'male grey kangaroo plain' One of Lefevre Park's borders is Lefevre Terrace; Sir J G Shaw-Lefevre (1797–1879), a British barrister, Whig politician and civil servant, was one of South Australia's colonisation commissioners.

Roughly trapezoidal, the park is bounded by Robe Terrace (NNE), Kingston Terrace (SE), Lefevre Terrace (WSW) and Medindie Road (NW).

Contains open park, mainly used for horse agistment. There are three main paddocks, four feeding yards, five horse troughs, and a number of sandpits for the horses to roll in. There is a limit of 20 horses, and those licensed pay a weekly fee. (In 2005, the fee was $19.50 per week.) According to the adelaideparklands.com.au website, "100,000 kg of horse manure is deposited by the resident horses on this park each year".

The open areas are surrounded by woodland. There is a playground on the western boundary (Lefevre Tce), one of the three Glover Playgrounds originally built in 1920, which also contains BBQ facilities and wide lawn spaces. The eastern third contains assorted playing fields, changing rooms, tennis courts and netball courts. Wilderness School holds a licence for eight tennis courts (also marked for netball), one cricket oval, two cricket practice nets, and three hockey/softball ovals. In 2005, there was also a green-painted brick structure with a flat roof, erected in the late 1960s, which "appears to have an undefined purpose and use".

=== Park 7: The Olive Groves / Kuntingga ===
Kuntingga 'kunti root place' (Park 7)

=== Park 8: The Olive Groves / Parngutilla ===
Parngutilla 'barngutta root place' (Park 8)

Parks 7 and 8 are small and elongated parks, with a combined area of 4.7 hectares, separating the east end of lower North Adelaide from Gilberton, and contain heritage listed olive groves. They act effectively as an enlarged median strip, with the major ring route of Park Terrace (southbound) and Mann Road (northbound) traversing the perimeter of both parks.

These parks were one of the first sites for the (European settlers) plantings of olives, and are the only section of the Park Lands that have kept the same use since the Council took over formal care of the Park Lands in the 1860s. The olive plantation is listed as a State Heritage Place.

=== Park 9: Bundey's Paddock / Tidlangga ===
Tidlangga 'tidla root place' William Bundey (1826–1889) was the Mayor of Adelaide 1883–1886.

A triangular shape, bounded by Mackinnon Parade (NE), Bundeys Road (S) and Hackney Road (W).

Contains assorted playing fields and changing rooms. An oval is licensed to Prince Alfred College on Saturday afternoons and Thursday evenings. In the past, contained a number of grass and bitumen tennis courts which have fallen into dis-repair and been removed.

=== Park 10: Bulrush Park / Warnpangga ===
Warnpangga 'bullrush root place' 19 hectares

Bounded by War Memorial Drive, Bundey's Road, MacKinnon Road, MacKinnon Parade, Finnis and Frome Road.

The Park is dominated by a number of sporting ovals and associated facilities licensed to the University of Adelaide, including a tennis pavilion, a grandstand, and changing rooms.

The Park also contains:

- The Adelaide Archery Club rooms, in the north eastern corner of the Park.
- The University Loop, a well used 2.2 km (1.4 mi) gravel running track, which encircles part of the Park.
- The Adelaide City Council Organic Recycling Depot/Nursery, (approx 1.6 hectares), comprising: an Office Building, 3 sheds, 6 glass houses, a shade house, and 6 propagating plant frames.
- The Lower North Adelaide Soldiers' Memorial Garden, located in the north of the Park.
- A number of sculptures, located in 1994 on the edge of the River Torrens.
- A small playground

=== Park 11: Mistletoe Park / Tainmuntilla ===
Tainmuntilla 'mistletoe place'

A quite large piece of land bounded by the River Torrens (north), Hackney Road (east), North Terrace (south), and Frome Road (west). It contains the Zoological Gardens, the Botanic Gardens, the Botanic Park, the Wine Centre, Frome Park / Nellie Raminyermmerin Park, the old Royal Adelaide Hospital (RAH) site, the Institute of Medical and Veterinary Science (IMVS), the old Medical School of the University of Adelaide site, and several University of South Australia buildings.

=== Park 12: Red Gum Park / Karrawirra ===
Karrawirra 'river red gum forest' ('karra' = red gum tree, 'wirra' = forest)

Contains many buildings, parks, memorials and statues – see Park 12 for a more complete list.

Park 12 is bisected by the river. The northern part contains the Peace Park, the Cross of Sacrifice, Pennington Gardens East, Angas Gardens, several boat-houses and several University playing fields. The southern part contains Grundy Gardens, the University of South Australia (City East campus), the University of Adelaide (main campus), Prince Henry Gardens, the Art Gallery, the Museum, the State Library, the War Memorial, Government House, the Torrens Parade Ground, Pioneer Women's Memorial Gardens, Esther Lipman Gardens, Jolly's Boat House, the Boer War Memorial, the Jubilee 150 Walkway, numerous statues, and quite a lot of other odds and ends.

=== Park 13: Rundle Park / Kadlitpina ===
Kadlitpina (formerly spelt Kadlitpinna) "Captain Jack" – named after the Kaurna elder painted by George French Angas. Kadlitpina was one of three burka, or elders, well-known to the colonists, the other two being Murlawirrapurka("King John") and Ityamai-itpina ("King Rodney") – see also Parks 14 and 15 below. His name was derived from kadli ("dingo"/"dog") + -itpinna (itpina) ("father of").

John Rundle (1791–1864) was a British Whig politician and businessman who was one of the original directors and financiers of the South Australia Company.

Since 2000, in February/March of most years, the park has been the site of the Garden of Unearthly Delights during the Adelaide Fringe.

=== Park 14: Rymill Park / Murlawirrapurka ===
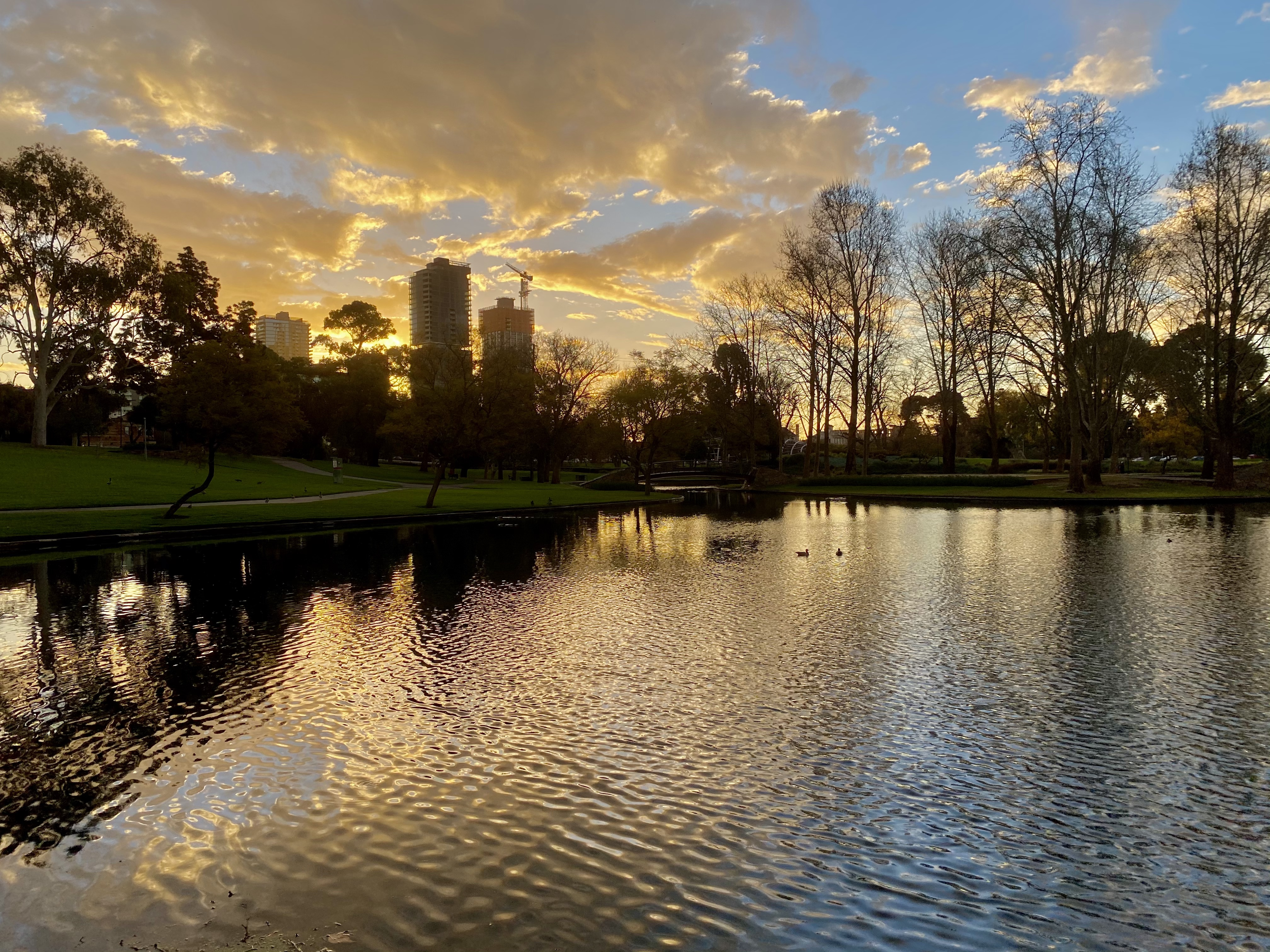
Rymill Park at sunset

Murlawirrapurka (Mullawirrapurka/Mullawirraburka) also known as "King John" "King Jack" or "Onkaparinga Jack", was the Kaurna leader (or burka, elder) of the Aldinga-Willunga area, and employed as a native constable. His name was derived from mulla ("dry") + wirra ("forest") + burka ("elder"). He was one of three elders well-known to the colonists (along with Kadlitpina, see above, and Ityamai-itpina, below), and more is known about him than any other Kaurna person of that time.

Sir Arthur Rymill (1907–1989) was Lord Mayor of Adelaide 1950–1953.

=== Park 15: King Rodney Park / Ityamai-itpina ===
Ityamai-itpina (formerly spelt Ityamai-itpinna), known to colonists as "King Rodney", was one of the three main Kaurna elders with whom the colonists negotiated, along with Mullawirraburka ("King John") and Kadlitpina ("Captain Jack"). He was one of the first Kaurna people met by the colonists, and was the father of Iparrityi and husband to Tangkaira. His name was derived from the name of a person student at Pirltawardli (see above) and -itpinna ("father of"). He was respected as an elder and negotiator, and his focus was on reconciliation between the settlers and the Kaurna people. There are no known photographs or drawings of Ityamai-itpina.

Ityamai-itpina contains one of the three Glover Playgrounds, the "Glover East Playspace". It has an olive grove planted in 1872, blue gums trees along Wakefield Road and an avenue of pepper trees dating from the early 20th century, and Botanic Creek runs through it. There are sports fields used by Christian Brothers College and others, including a basketball court and a skate park. In the middle of the Adelaide Street Circuit, it borders the Tour Down Under cycling event each January, and the international equestrian three-day event uses the park each November. There is a 1.6-kilometre (0.99 mi) walking trail around the park.

In 2021, due to the COVID-19 pandemic in Australia, the WOMADelaide music festival was held in King Rodney Park / Ityamai-itpina instead of its usual location at Botanic Park, so that the venue could comply with the restrictions necessary to prevent any possible spread of COVID-19 (although there was no community transmission at the time in Adelaide).

=== Park 16: Victoria Park / Pakapakanthi ===
Pakapakanthi/Bakkabakkandi derived from the Kaurna word meaning "to trot" (a term applied to horses), is a large park, comprising 72 hectares (180 acres)

This park used to contain the Victoria Park Racecourse, and the historic buildings are retained. There are sports fields in the centre, and the South Park Lands creek runs through the southern part, which has been revegetated with open woodland. In the late eighties and early nineties, part of the park was used for the Adelaide F1. It forms part of the Adelaide Street Circuit for the Adelaide 500 motor race, and it is used for the international equestrian three-day event in November.

=== Park 17: Carriageway Park / Tuthangga ===
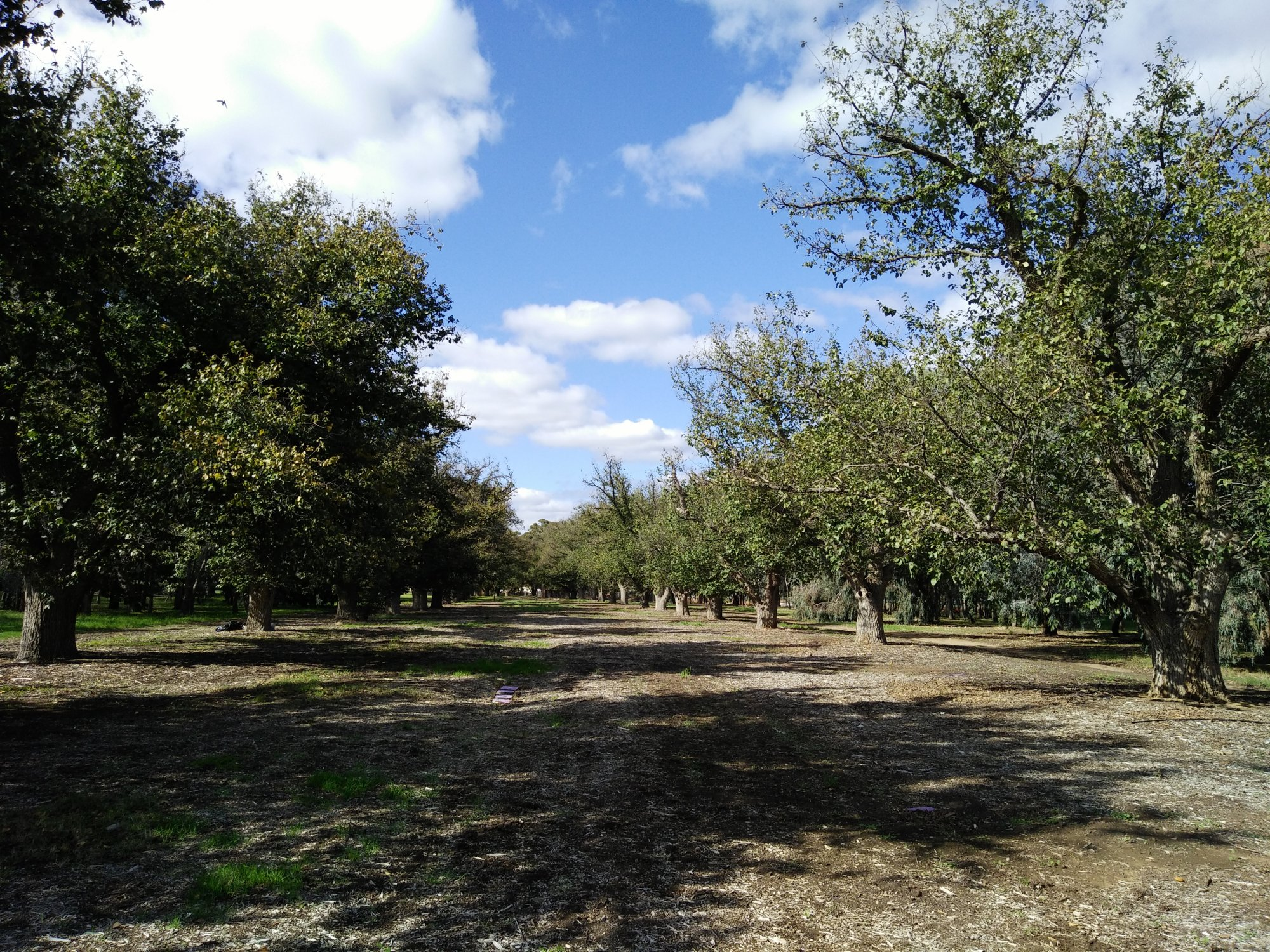

Tuttangga, meaning "grass place", has a double avenue, planned by John Ednie Brown, which was planted with elm trees in the 1880s.

The Park Lands Creek runs through the park. Historically (from 1837) the park was the site of Elm Avenue, Desert Ash Avenue and an Engineering and Water Supply (E&WS) reservoir. There are numerous licensees of sporting facilities and clubrooms, including the SA Dog Obedience Club, the Pembroke Old Scholars Women and Men's Soccer Clubs, and the SA Croquet Club.

On 14 May 2021, a scheduled cultural burn took place Tuthangga by representatives of the Kaurna people, in a highly symbolic moment after years of preparation to restore the ancient practice. The project, called Kaurna Kardla Parranthi, was undertaken with the support of the City of Adelaide, and was part of the ecological management plan for a key area of biodiversity in the park. Six months later, an informal inspection revealed about 12 species of native grass, and very few weeds in the area burnt. Bush for Life and various experts are continuing to monitor outcomes.

=== Park 18: Peppermint Park / Wita Wirra ===
Wita Wirra, meaning "peppermint grove/place" (wita, peppermint tree, + wirra, forest or bush).

This park, south of South Terrace, contains Adelaide Himeji Garden and Osmond Gardens.

=== Park 19: Pelzer Park / Pityarilla ===
Pityarilla/Pityarilla 'marshmallow root place' 23ha August Pelzer was Adelaide's city gardener from 1899 to 1932.

A large triangular park bounded by Glen Osmond Road. The Park Lands Creek runs across the middle of the Park. Open park and playing fields. Also contains The Marshmallow Park recreation hub.

In 2005 there were leases and licences to: Adelaide City Junior Soccer Club for five soccer pitches and club rooms; St Aloysius College for four tennis courts and change rooms; Adelaide Comets Soccer Club for a single soccer pitch and "building".

=== Park 20: Blue Gum Park / Kurangga ===
Kurrangga 'blue gum place' 30.1ha

Contains a boule/petanque area, assorted playing fields, a mountain-bike / BMX-bike track, one of the three Glover Playgrounds, et al.

Licences and leases include Pulteney Grammar School (6 ovals, cricket nets, 3 lawn tennis courts, 2 grass volleyball courts, and facilities), Adelaide Harriers Athletics Club (athletics oval / running track), Club d'Petanque d'Adelaide, TreeClimb (High Ropes Adventure Course) and others.

=== Park 21: Veale Park / Walyu Yarta ===
Veale Park contains Veale Gardens.

Walyu Yarta 'walyu root ground' 31ha

Contains Veale Gardens, assorted playing fields, et al.

=== Park 21W: Golden Wattle Park / Mirnu Wirra ===
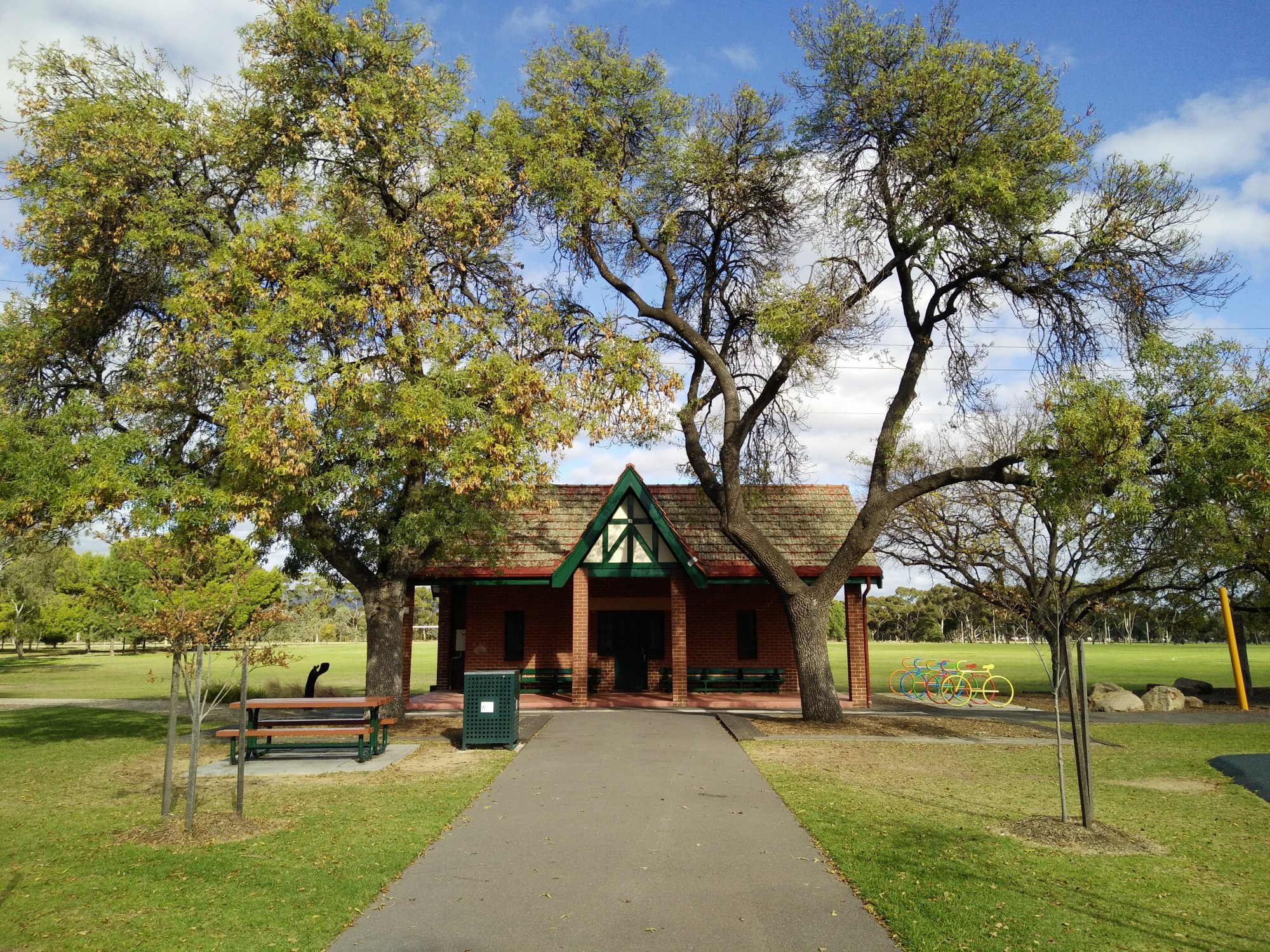

Mirnu Wirra 'golden wattle grove' 31ha Contains Princess Elizabeth Playground, Lundie Gardens, assorted playing fields, et al.

=== Park 22: Josie Agius Park / Wikaparntu Wirra ===
Wikaparntu Wirra / Wikaparndo Wirra 'netball park' (wika 'net' + parndo 'ball' + wirra 'forest; bush') 15.1ha

Josie Agius (1934–2016) was one of South Australia's first Aboriginal health workers, who supported girls' sport. She was honoured with the 2014 NAIDOC Award "for improving the lives and welfare of Aboriginal peoples in South Australia". She was a descendant of Kudnarto, and sister to Vince Copley.

The park contains about 20 netball courts, a small amount of seating for spectators, and a building containing a small kiosk, netball administration rooms, and a toilet block.

=== Park 23: G S Kingston Park / Wirrarninthi ===
G S Kingston Park contains Kingston Gardens.

Wirrarninthi / Warranendi 'to become transformed into a green and forested area'. 57.43 ha Sir George Strickland Kingston was Deputy Surveyor-General under Colonel Light, one of the party that found the River Torrens, and first Speaker of the South Australian House of Assembly.

Contains Edwards Park, West Terrace Cemetery, Kingston Gardens, West Terrace playground, et al.

The park is divided into northern and southern areas by the cemetery. The cemetery is a State Heritage Place managed by the Adelaide Cemeteries Authority, which reports to the State Government. The southern part of the park, used between 1939 and 2000 by the South Australian Netball Association, is called Edwards Park, named after Councillor A.A. Edwards.

=== Park 24: Ellis Park / Tampawardli ===
Ellis Park is one of the parks in Park 24.

Tampawardli Tampawardli/Tambawodli 'plain place' 35.7ha Val Bertram Harold Ellis served as City of Adelaide Director of Parks and Recreation from 1966 to 1983.

Contains the State Heritage-listed Adelaide High School buildings and assorted sports grounds. It was the site of the former, now demolished, Emigration Square 1837-1849, the former Observatory, and the Post and Telegraph Store (off West Terrace) depicted in Colonel Light's 1837 Plan for Adelaide.

=== Park 25: Gladys Elphick Park / Narnungga ===
Narnungga "native pine place" 24ha Gladys Elphick MBE was a Kaurna elder who, among other things, was founding president of the Council of Aboriginal Women of South Australia (1964–73).

The park is bisected by the Adelaide-Melbourne railway line. The eastern part contains assorted sports grounds, including the Karen Rolton Oval at the east end of the park. Until the buildings were demolished in November 2010, the park also contained SA Water land and buildings on the western side of the railway line; this western section has since been revegetated.

In October 2020, in the opening round of the 2020–21 Sheffield Shield season, Park 25 hosted its maiden first-class cricket match.

=== Park 26: Adelaide Oval / Tarntanya Wama ===
Although Adelaide Oval dominates the north part of the park, there are many other parks, gardens and buildings on both sides of the River Torrens in Park 26.

Tarntanya Wama / Tarndanya Womma 'Adelaide plain/oval' ('tarnda' = red kangaroo, 'kanya' = rock and 'womma' = plain/oval.) 54.1ha

Like Park 12, it is bisected by the River Torrens. The northern part contains the Adelaide Oval, Creswell Gardens, Memorial Drive Park, Pinky Flat, Oval Number 2, Stella Bowen Park, Light's Vision and Pennington Gardens West. The southern part contains Parliament House, Old Parliament House, Adelaide railway station, Adelaide Casino, the Riverbank development, the Convention Centre, assorted boat houses, the Festival Centre and Elder Park

=== Park 27: Bonython Park / Tulya Wardli ===
Park 27 / Tulya Wardli (also spelt Tulya Wodli) contains a number of parks, only one of which is Bonython Park. It is a large irregular-shaped area of bounded by the tram line (West Terrace and Port Road – south, south-west, west), Park Terrace (north-west), Memorial Drive (north-east, east, north-east, north) and the Morphett St Bridge (east). 118 ha (290 acres). It is dissected by railway lines and the River Torrens, and much of the south-eastern part of the park is occupied by the new Royal Adelaide Hospital and Medical Research and Teaching precincts, and is not accessible to the public. It contains several buildings, other structures, and features. The park is made up of a number of separate sections, several of which have "land managers" which are not the City of Adelaide. A strip of land between the river and the railway yards west of the Morphett Street Bridge, given to the council in the 1990s, contained contaminated land.

The park contains the Torrens Weir, restaurant and Par 3 putting course, the Dame Roma Mitchell Gardens, the Old Adelaide Gaol, the Bonython Park, the John E Brown Park (Park 27a), the Mary Lee Park, the Helen Mayo Park, the Kate Cocks Park, and the Deceased Workers Memorial Forest.

As of 2006, buildings and other structures included the Thebarton Police Barracks (which includes the Road Safety Centre); the new Royal Adelaide Hospital; SAHMRI (South Australian Health and Medical Research Institute); various hospital and University of Adelaide buildings on the former site of the City Sk8 Park; the remainder of the railway yard (the bulk of which was relocated to Dry Creek); assorted broad gauge and standard gauge railway lines and bridges, six tennis courts, some boat houses and rowing clubs' clubhouses.

As of 2017 it was planned that should the Women's and Children's Hospital be moved from North Adelaide, and relocated to Park 27. There were also plans for a second SAHMRI building and a private hospital. In September 2022, the state government announced that the Thebarton Police Barracks, comprising 10 buildings which are state heritage-listed, would be demolished to allow construction of a new Women's and Children's Hospital, planned for opening around 2030–31. The site covers 20,000 m^{2} (220,000 sq ft). The South Australian Heritage Council, the Australian Institute of Architects, and many others have voiced their concerns about the loss of the historic building.

=== Park 28: Palmer Gardens / Pangki Pangki ===
Pangki Pangki Pangki Pangki was a Kaurna person who was a tracker and guide. Colonel George Palmer (1799-1883) was a South Australian Colonisation Commissioner.

=== Park 29: Brougham Gardens / Tantutitingga ===
Tantutitingga/Tandotittingga 'Native lilac place' Lord Brougham (1778-1868) was Lord High Chancellor of the United Kingdom and founder of the London University.

Brougham Gardens are surrounded by Brougham Place, North Adelaide.

== Planned parks ==
Other parks are the location for institutions requiring large expanses of turf or other greenery. Planned parks such as these include:

- Adelaide Botanic Gardens (Park 11)
- Adelaide Botanic Park (Park 11)
- Adelaide High School's sports grounds (Park 24)
- Adelaide Himeji Garden (Park 18)
- Adelaide Golf Links (Park 1)
- Victoria Park Racecourse (Park 16)
- Adelaide Street Circuit (Surrounding Parks 14 & 15, and inside Park 16)
- Adelaide Oval (Park 26)
- Elder Park (Park 26)
- Veale Gardens (Park 21)

== Buildings/institutions within the Park Lands ==
- Adelaide Aquatic Centre (Park 2)
- Adelaide Botanic Garden* (Park 11)
- Adelaide Botanic High School (Park 11)
- Adelaide Convention Centre* (Park 26)
- Adelaide Festival Centre (Park 26)
- Adelaide Gaol (Park 27)
- Adelaide High School (Park 24)
- Adelaide Oval (Park 26)
- Adelaide Park Lands Terminal (Park 23)
- Adelaide railway station* (Park 26)
- Adelaide University Boat Club (Park 12)
- Adelaide Zoo (Park 11)
- Art Gallery of South Australia* (Park 12)
- Botanic Park (Park 11)
- Eos by SkyCity* (Park 26)
- Festival Tower* (under construction) (Park 26)
- Government House* (Park 12)
- Hellas Club Rooms (Park 27b)
- Institute of Medical and Veterinary Science (Park 11)
- Memorial Drive (Park 26)
- Mile End railway station (Park 24)
- National War Memorial* (Park 12)
- National Wine Centre (Park 11)
- North Adelaide railway station (Park 27)
- North Adelaide Golf Club Club Rooms (Park 1)
- Parliament House* (Park 26)
- Royal Adelaide Hospital* (Old site:Park 11, New site:Park 27)
- South Australian Museum* (Park 12)
- State Library of South Australia* (Park 12)
- Thebarton Police Barracks (Park 27)
- Torrens Parade Ground (Park 12)
- University of Adelaide City (main) campus* (Park 12)
- University of South Australia City East campus* (Park 12)
- Victoria Park Racecourse buildings (Park 16)
- West Terrace Cemetery (Park 23)

* North Terrace forms the southern boundary of these establishments.

Now-demolished buildings/structures which were built on the Park Lands include:

- Colonial Iron Store c. 1838–unknown (Park 1)
- Jubilee Exhibition Building* 1887–1962 (Park 12)
- Jubilee Exhibition Railway 1887–1927 (Park 12)
- Piltawodli Native School 1839-1845 (Park 1)

== Park Land preservation movement ==
Since the Park Lands were set apart by William Light as part of his original 1837 Plan of the City of Adelaide, and intended by the city founders to be reserved as public walks in perpetuity, any development can be seen to go against the founding ambitions for Adelaide and be a source of controversy in the community.

In response to incessant pressure and erosion, there have been many defenders of the Adelaide Park Lands. In 1987 a public meeting was held, which resulted in the formation of the Adelaide Parklands Preservation Association Inc, (APPA), which later corrected its name to Adelaide Park Lands Preservation Association Inc. and in 2021 removed "Preservation" from its name, which is now Adelaide Park Lands Association Inc (APA). Examples of such pressure and erosion are listed on APA's "Current Issues" page.

An example of one such source of controversy is the Victoria Park racecourse and associated areas south-east of the city centre which have been used for motor racing events for short periods of each year. In 2008 these parts of the Park Lands were targeted for development, incurring opposition from members of the community. The proposed plans included construction of a permanent corporate facility to provide hospitality and spectator facilities to select groups at events such as the Adelaide 500 motor racing event.

On 30 August 2007 veteran Adelaide heritage consultant and conservation architect Ron Danvers said it was "a myth" that Adelaide's founding fathers created the parklands [sic] exclusively for open space, and that it was "self-evident" that Colonel William Light's 1837 plan of Adelaide envisaged development of facilities beyond the CBD. In a submission to the Adelaide City Council, Danvers said the state government's $55 million plan for a grandstand at Victoria Park for horse and motor racing was "completely consistent with the founding principles for the city". "Under Light's direction, the intention to locate public facilities outside of the main street grid is beyond question", he said in a report commissioned by developers KBR.

After counter-arguments were expressed, the proposal was dropped.

== See also ==
- List of Adelaide parks and gardens
