= Strangways Terrace =

Road in North Adelaide, Australia

Strangways Terrace South Australia
- Coordinates: 34.9129°S 138.5925°E (East end); 34.9116°S 138.5836°E (West end)

General information
- Type: Street
- Length: 1.1 km (0.7 mi)
- Maintained by: City of Adelaide
- History: yes

Major junctions

Location(s)
- LGA(s): City of Adelaide

Strangways Terrace is a street in North Adelaide, South Australia. It is the southwestern boundary between the built environment and the Adelaide parklands including the Adelaide Golf Links.

Strangways Terrace is named after Thomas Bewes Strangways who was a member of the Street Naming Committee which met in 1837 to assign names to the streets of the new settlement. It includes a number of grand residences and other places from the early years of the colony which are recorded and protected in the South Australian Heritage Register. The Calvary North Adelaide Hospital maternity ward dating from the 1940s has local heritage listing.

Strangways Terrace was the site of the first Colonial Store operated by Thomas Gilbert to supply equipment to government parties.
