= Adelaide Himeji Garden =

Traditional Japanese garden in Adelaide, South Australia

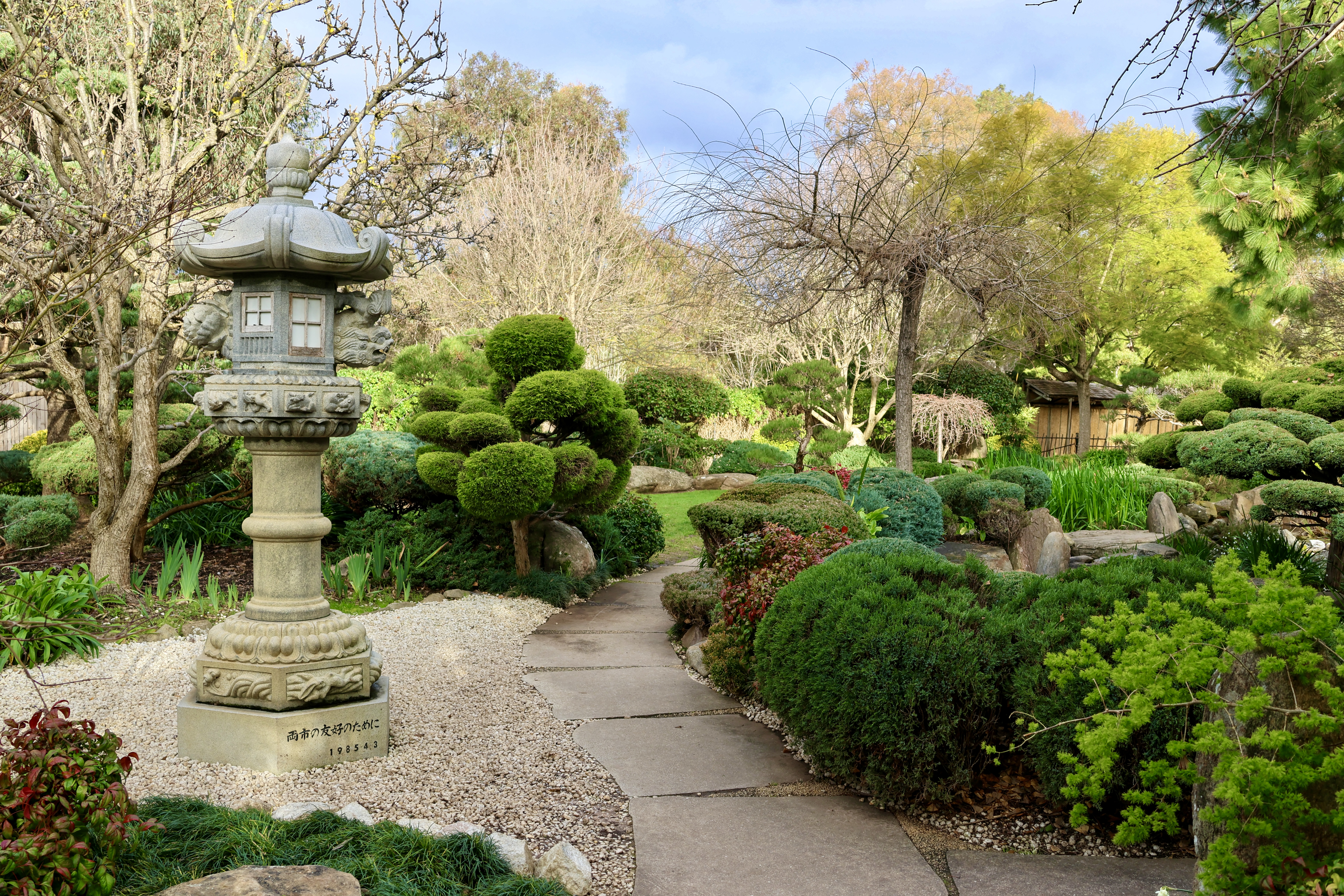
- Adelaide Himeji Garden in 2026
- Interactive map of Adelaide Himeji Garden
- Type: Japanese garden
- Location: Adelaide, South Australia, Australia
- Coordinates: 34.9358°S 138.6098°E
- Area: 2,250 m^{2} (0.56 acres)
- Established: 1985
- Designer: Yoshitaka Kumada
- Etymology: Himeji, Japan
- Operator: City of Adelaide

Adelaide Himeji Garden is a traditionally-styled Japanese garden, a gift from Adelaide's sister city, Himeji in 1982. It is located in Park 18 (Peppermint Park / Wita Wirra), one of the southern parts of the Adelaide Park Lands in Adelaide, South Australia. The entrance is from South Terrace, between Pulteney and Hutt streets.

== History ==
The garden was originally designed by council staff, in consultation with the Adelaide Japanese community, after Adelaide and Himeji entered a sister city relationship in 1982. However, aspects of the garden's design were criticised, including its cyclone fence and lack of attention to detail.

In 1986, Japanese landscape designer Yoshitaka Kumada drew up plans to refurbish the garden, which included the purchase of trees and shrubs from Melbourne, and stones from near Adelaide. After a Shinto ground-breaking ceremony in May 1987, the works began, with Kumada himself overseeing the project. The little lake was reshaped, the Sea of Sand was expanded, and the garden filled with carefully selected plants and ornamentation to complement the granite Okunoin lantern gifted by the City of Himeji in 1985. The redesign was finally implemented completely in 1989, but Kumada continued to visit each year during the early 1990s, tweaking details and teaching techniques to the council gardeners.

== Description ==
Many of Kumada's design principles are still in evidence. The paving stones are of a size that compels an adult walker to slow down. The garden is split into a sansui (山水), a "mountain and lake garden", and a kare-sansui (枯山水), a "dry rock garden", intended to evoke mountains surrounded by water, even the sea.

The council's horticulture team still use the techniques taught by Kumada himself, handed down as staff moved on. Maintenance of the Sea of Sand demands careful attention, to retain its basic pattern, showing waves coming into those islands and straight lines for the ocean.

== Gallery ==
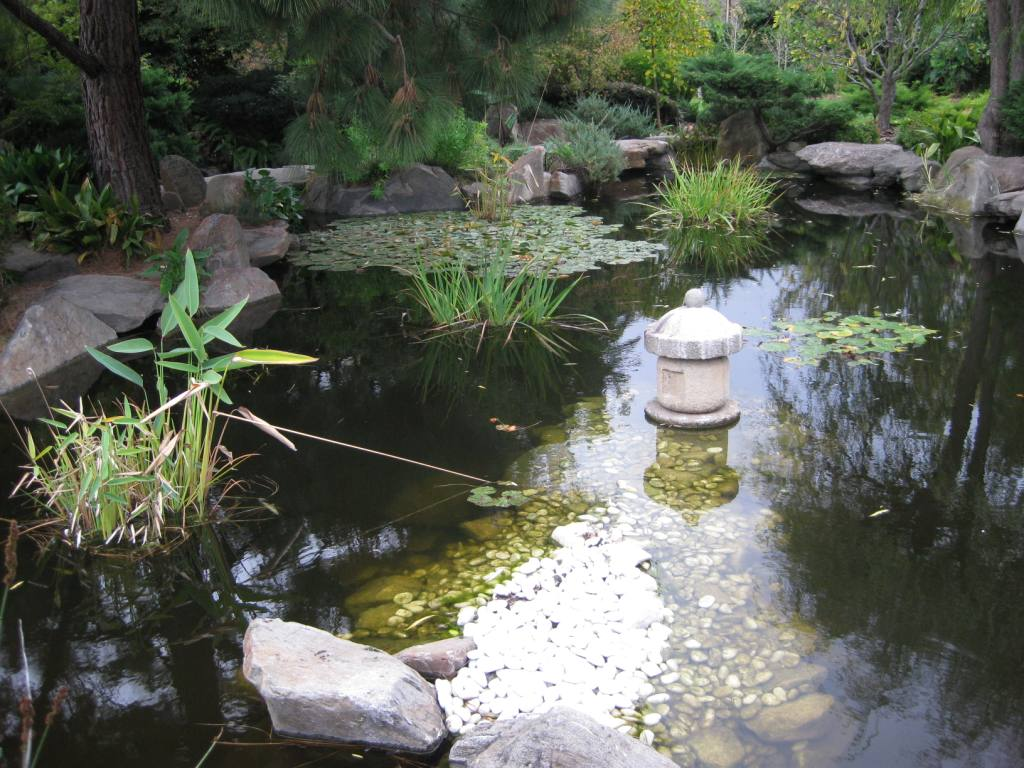
lake in Himeji Garden

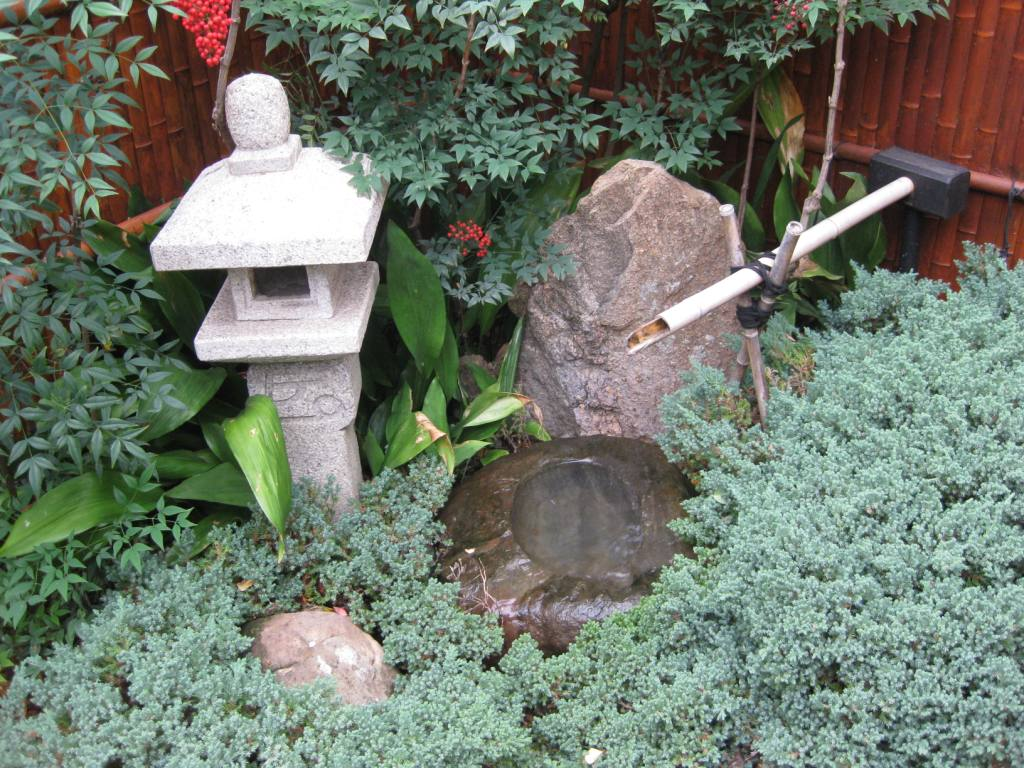

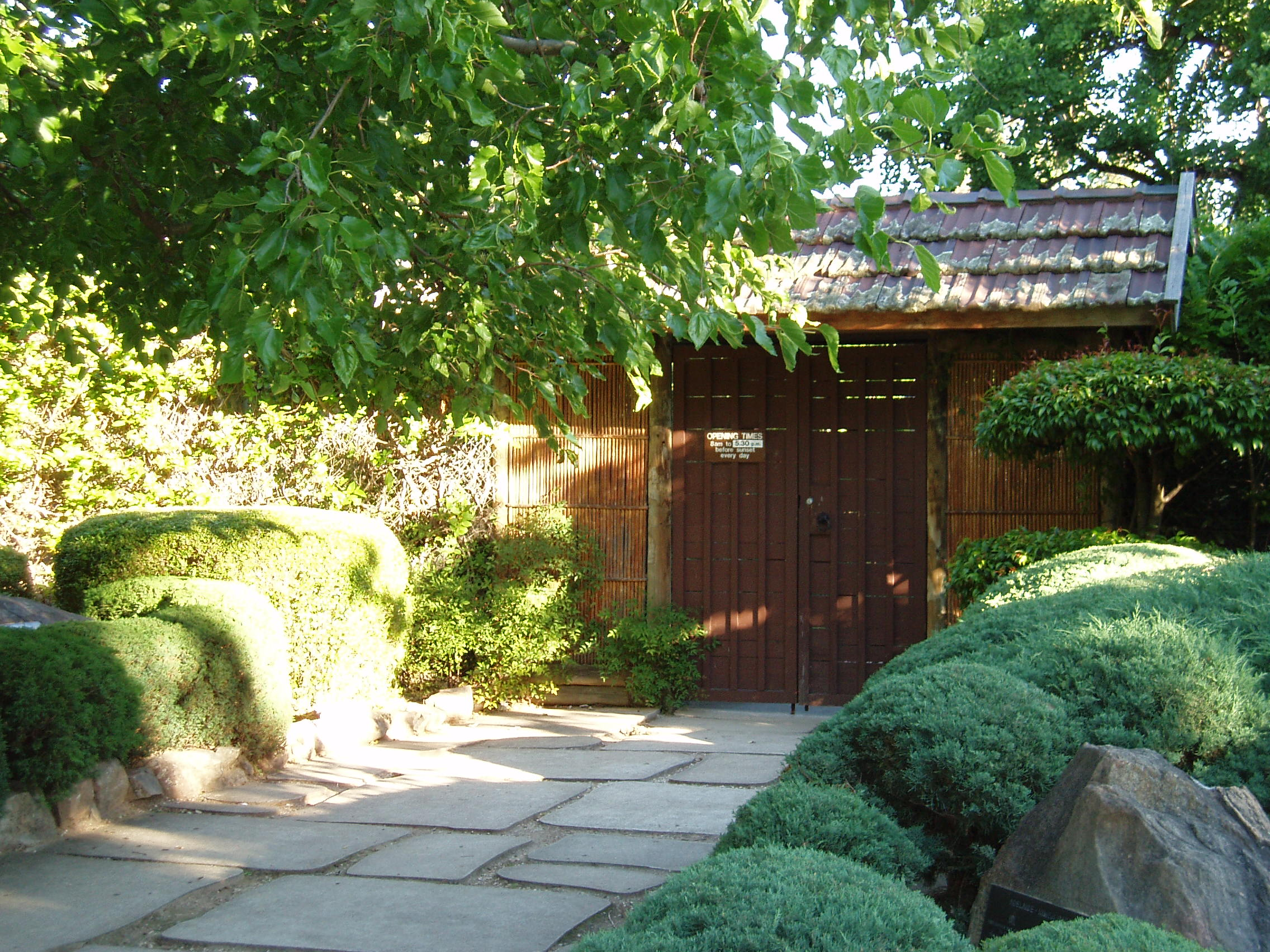
Entrance to Himeji Garden

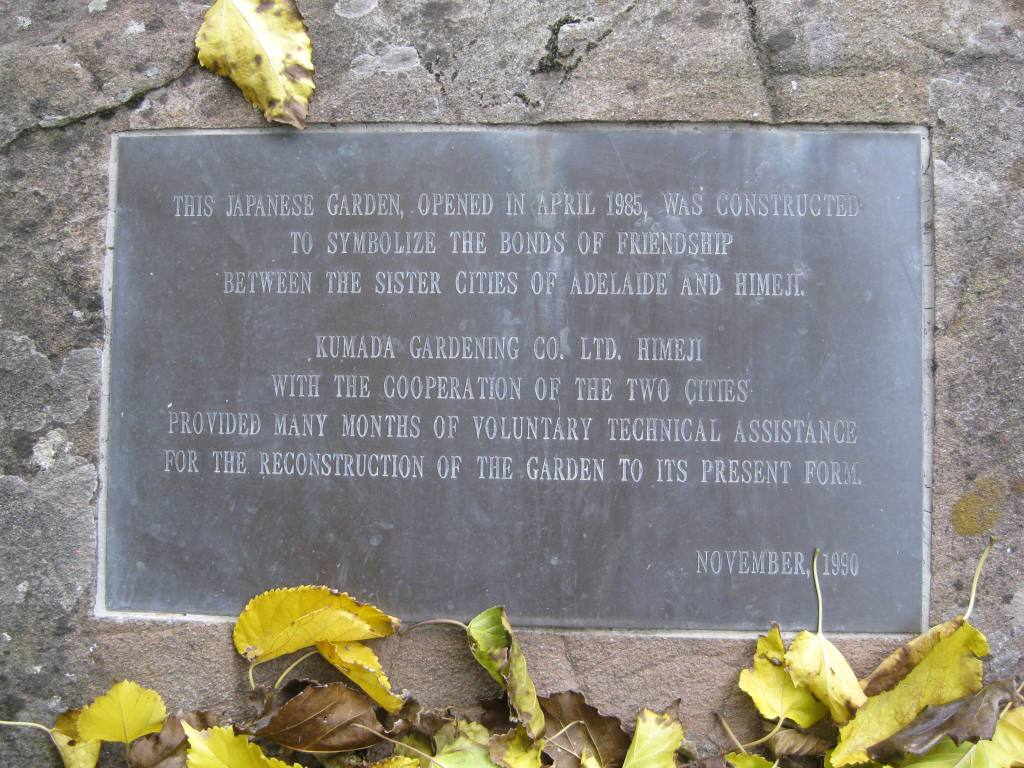
Information plaque

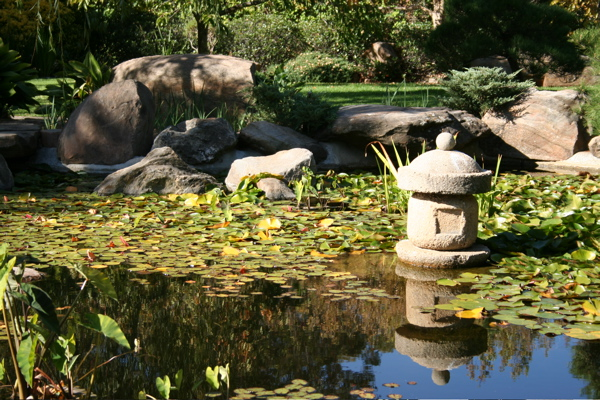
lake in Himeji Garden

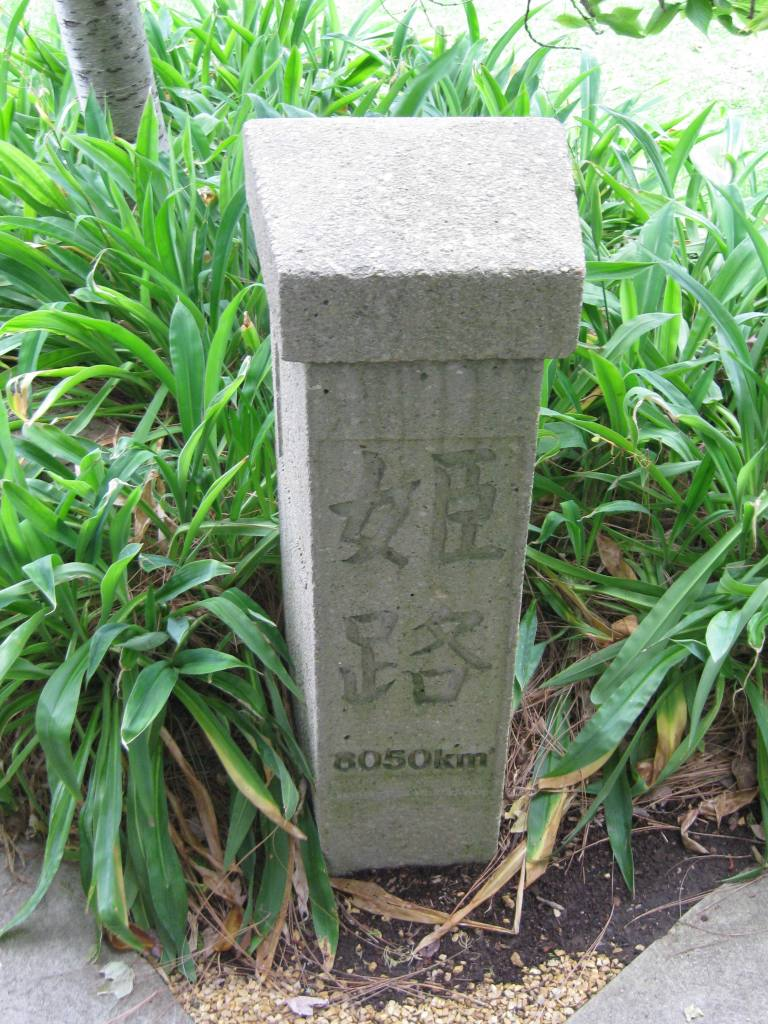
Pillar in the garden
