= Botanic Park, Adelaide =

Park in Adelaide, South Australia

Coordinates: 34°54′52.49″S 138°36′38.70″E

Botanic Park
- Tainmuntilla
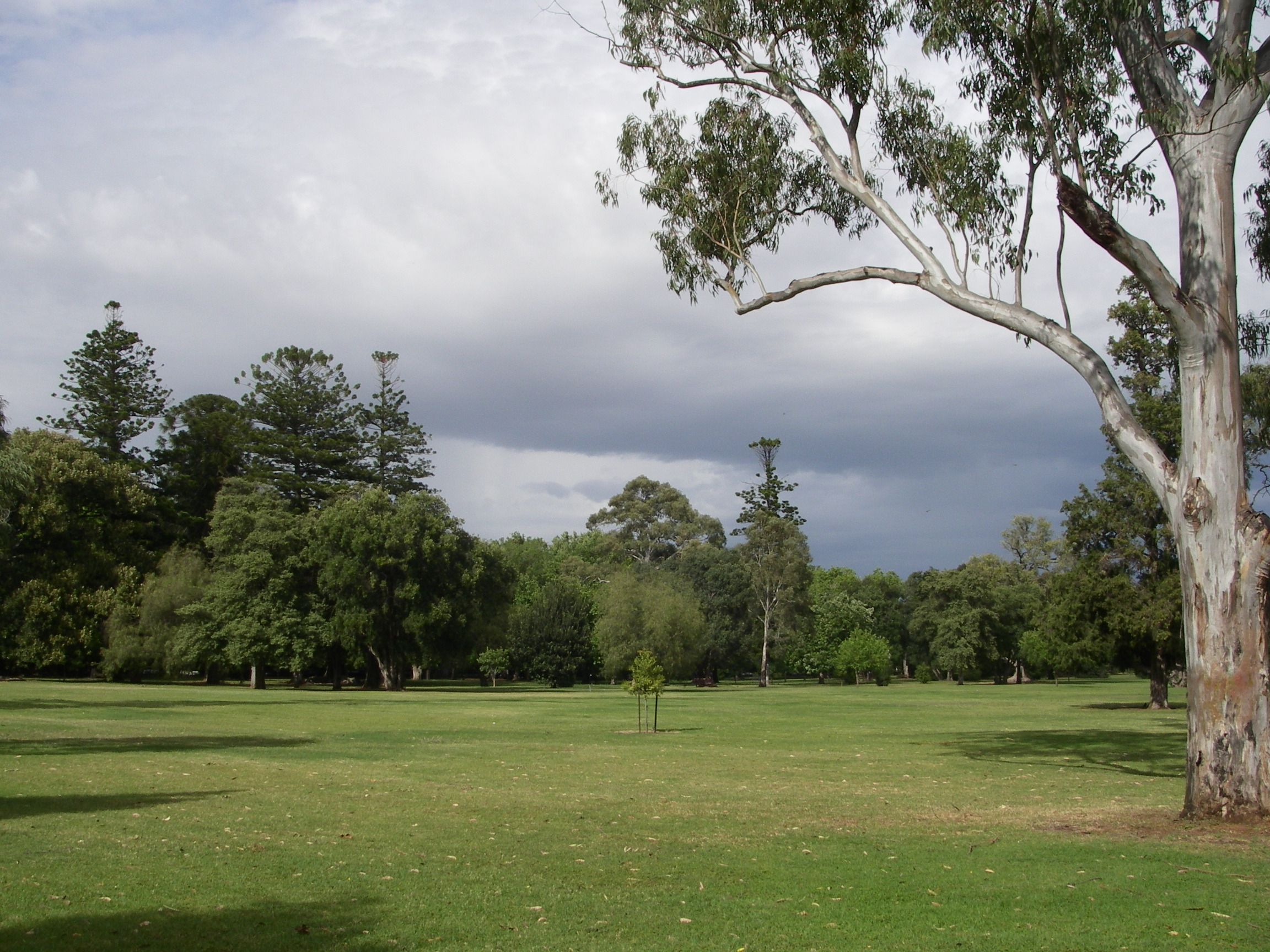
- Botanic Park in 2007

- Location within City of Adelaide
- Type: Public park and arboretum
- Location: Adelaide, South Australia, Australia
- Area: 34 ha (84 acres)
- Created: 1873
- Operator: Botanic Gardens and State Herbarium of South Australia
- Website: www.botanicgardens.sa.gov.au/visit/botanic-park-tainmuntilla

Botanic Park, part of Park 11 (also referred to as Mistletoe Park or Tainmuntilla), is a 34-hectare (84-acre) park in the Northeast Parklands of the South Australian capital of Adelaide. The park is bordered by Hackney Road and Frome Road. The University of South Australia, University of Adelaide, and the old Royal Adelaide Hospital are next to this park. The park also abuts the Adelaide Zoo and River Torrens.

== History ==
The park was acquired by the adjacent Adelaide Botanic Garden in 1866, and was formerly used as the venue for the Royal Adelaide Show from 1844 to 1859. On its northern side are an avenue of plane trees planted in 1874. It is also dotted with exotic species such as century-old Moreton Bay figs from Queensland. The park was the venue for the first open-air meeting in Australia of The Salvation Army on 5 September 1880.

The park has been compared to Hyde Park in London. With its own Speakers' Corner since the 1890s, Botanic Park is a venue for public debate on a wide range of topics. The Speakers' Corner continues, but with less prominence than in previous times. Today, the park is better known as a site for picnics, wedding-party photographs, and major events such as WOMADelaide, Gardens Alive and Moonlight Cinema.

== See also ==
- List of Adelaide parks and gardens
