= South Terrace, Adelaide =

Road in Adelaide, South Australia

South Terrace South Australia
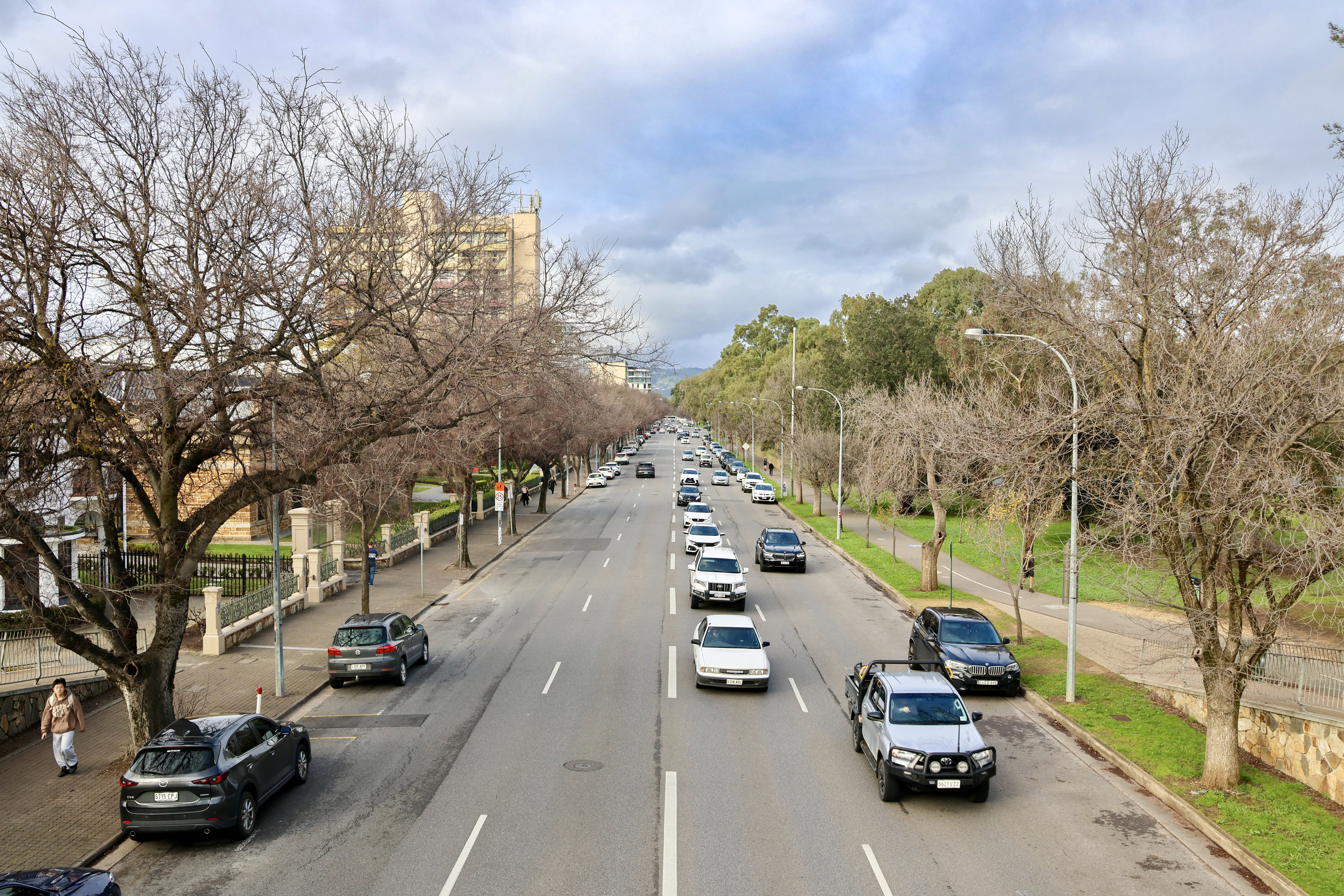
- Looking east in 2026
- Coordinates: 34.936285°S 138.588442°E (West end); 34.934777°S 138.617781°E (East end)

General information
- Type: Street
- Location: Adelaide city centre
- Length: 2.7 km (1.7 mi)
- Opened: 1837

Major junctions
- West end: West Terrace; Goodwood Road; Anzac Highway; Adelaide
- Morphett Street; King William Street; Frome Street; Pulteney Street; Unley Road; Glen Osmond Road; Hutt Street
- East end: East Terrace; Beaumont Road; Adelaide

Location(s)
- LGA(s): City of Adelaide

South Terrace is one of the four terraces which bound the city centre of Adelaide, the capital of South Australia.

It is the southern edge of the city centre, and is bounded by the Adelaide parklands to the south, including Veale Gardens and Adelaide Himeji Garden.

South Terrace runs east from the intersection of West Terrace, Anzac Highway and Goodwood Road. Other major intersections are with King William Street/Peacock Road, where the Glenelg tram line crosses, and the intersection of Pulteney Street and Glen Osmond Road.

Adelaide Trades Hall and Pulteney Grammar School are located on South Terrace, as is a large office tower owned by Optus.

South Terrace is also the location of a stop on the Glenelg tram line.

Preceding station	Adelaide Metro	Following station
City South towards Royal Adelaide Hospital, Adelaide Entertainment Centre or Festival Plaza	Glenelg tram line	Greenhill Road towards Moseley Square
