= W. C. D. Veale =

Australian engineer, surveyor and soldier

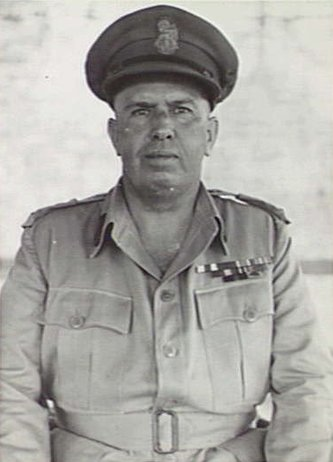
- Brigadier Veale in Lae, New Guinea, 1945
- Born: 16 May 1895; Bendigo, Victoria
- Died: 17 August 1971 (aged 76); North Adelaide, South Australia
- Military career
- Allegiance: Australia
- Branch: Australian Army
- Service years: 1916–1946
- Rank: Brigadier
- Commands: Moresby Base Sub-Area (1944); Engineer Training Centre (1942–44); Sparrow Force (1942); Royal Engineers, 7th Military District (1941); 2/3rd Pioneer Battalion (1940–41); 10th Battalion (1936–40); 10th/50th Battalion (1936)
- Conflicts: First World War; Western Front; Battle of Broodseinde; Battle of Mont Saint-Quentin; Second World War; Battle of Timor; New Guinea campaign
- Awards: Commander of the Order of the British Empire; Military Cross; Distinguished Conduct Medal; Efficiency Decoration; Mentioned in Despatches
- Other work: Engineer and surveyor, City of Adelaide

Brigadier William Charles Douglas Veale, CBE, MC, DCM, ED (16 May 1895 – 17 August 1971), generally known as W. C. D. Veale, was an Australian engineer, surveyor and soldier. He is best known as the longtime (1947–1965) town clerk of the Adelaide City Council, and had significant influence in the development and change of character of the City of Adelaide during that period. For example, in conjunction with four-time Lord Mayor of Adelaide, Arthur Campbell Rymill, Veale was responsible for significant improvements to the Adelaide Park Lands. He was also a senior soldier and military engineer who served in both the First and Second World Wars, and is notable for his involvement in the Battle of Timor and during the Japanese occupation of the Dutch East Indies.

Veale Gardens in Adelaide's South Parklands is named in his honour.

== Early years ==
Veale was born in Bendigo on 16 May 1895, and educated locally. He was later apprenticed to an engineer at the Whittlesea Council in Morang, Victoria.

== First World War ==
Veale enlisted in the Australian Imperial Force on 14 February 1916. In October 1917, while he was one of a party marking out an assembly position, the party came under fire and several of the party were seriously wounded. While under continuous shell fire, Veale attended to all of their wounds, got them to safety and then successfully marked out the assembly position. "For conspicuous gallantry and devotion to duty", he was awarded the Distinguished Conduct Medal.

Veale was commissioned lieutenant in May 1918. While on operations in the Somme, France, in August 1918, in a single night when under enemy shelling, he supervised the construction of two bridges required for use by the infantry next morning, without alerting the enemy. For this deed he was awarded the Military Cross. The citation for the medal, appearing in The London Gazette in February 1919, reads as follows:

During operations on the Somme on the night of the 28th/29th September, 1918, bridges were required to cross the canal between Eterpigny and Peronne. In spite of the darkness and persistent desultory shell fire, he reconnoitred the banks for suitable sites, and then proceeded with the dangerous work of transporting materials. Constantly harassed by shell fire, darkness and shortage of time, by his fine example of courage and energy, he constructed two excellent bridges in time for use by the infantry next morning.

== Interbellum ==
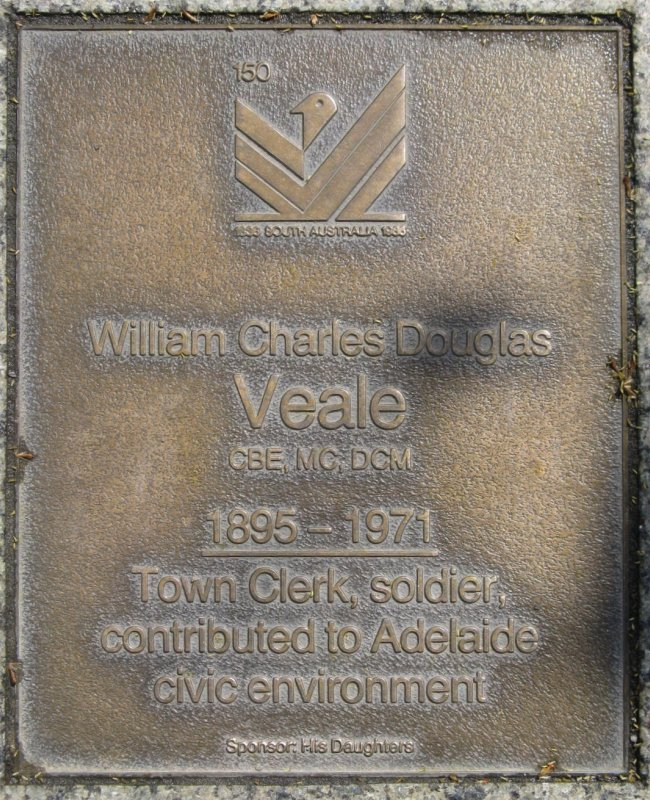
Plaque on the Jubilee 150 Walkway

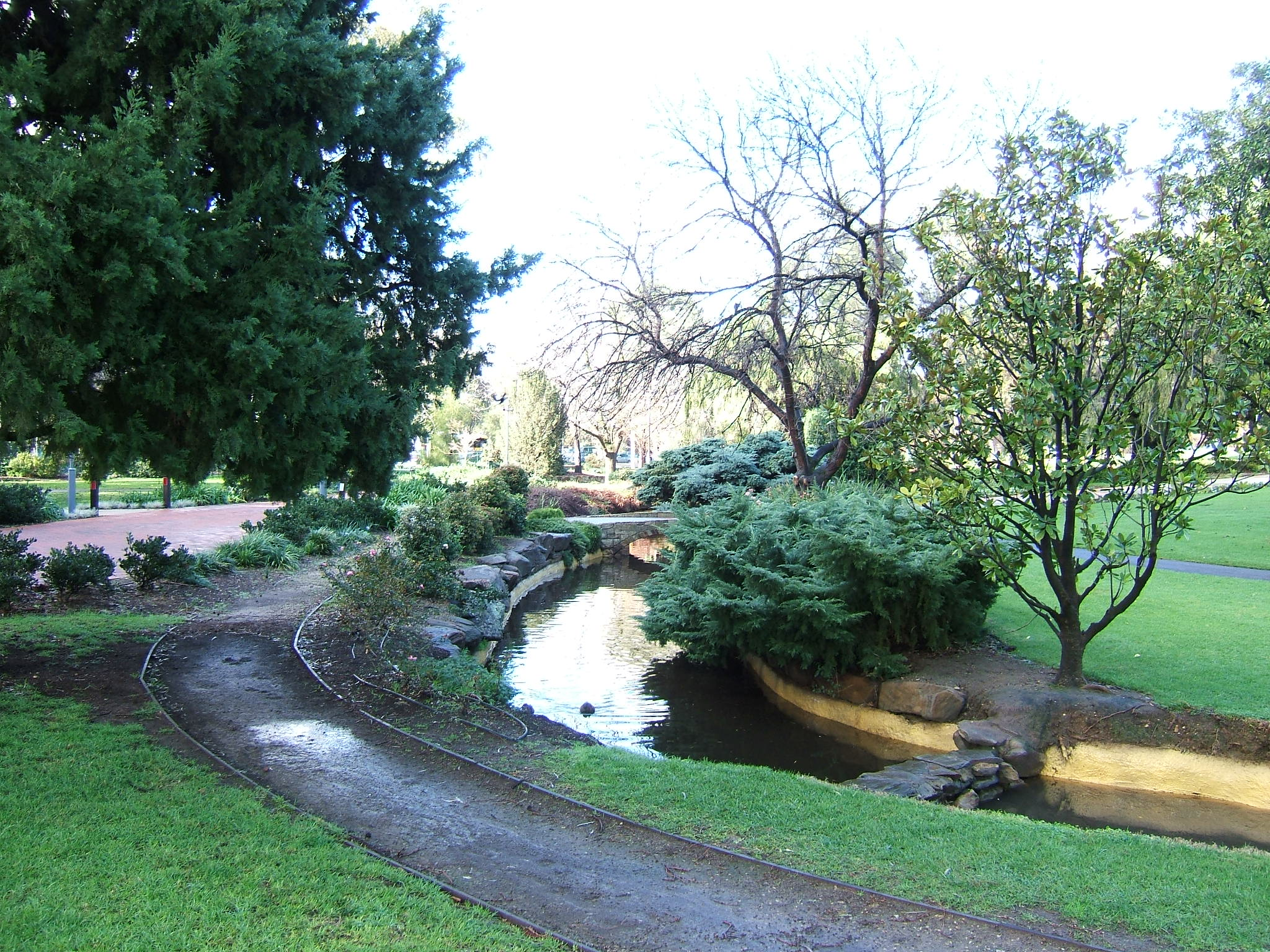
Veale Gardens

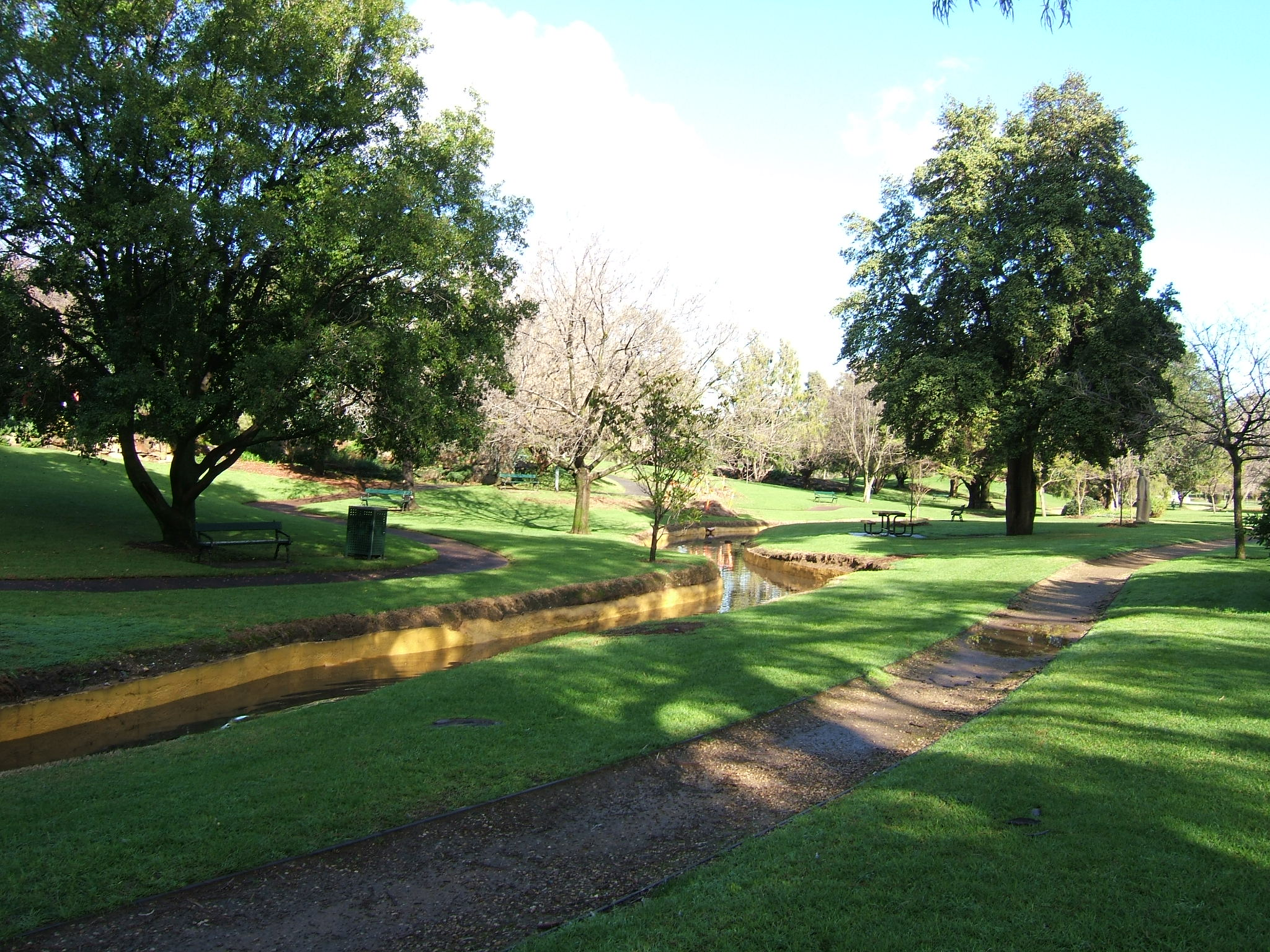
Veale Gardens

After a period working at Stoke-on-Trent and the Ministry of Transport in London, Veale returned to Victoria, serving as engineer to the Shire of Kowree Council at Edenhope. He married Eileen Guest at All Saints' Church of England, Bright, on 12 February 1923.

On 8 October 1923 Veale became Assistant City Engineer and Surveyor to the City of Adelaide at an annual salary of A£450. In 1926 he became Deputy City Engineer, and City Engineer in 1929. During this period he served with the Citizens Military Force, rising to the rank of colonel.

== Second World War ==
Prior to and during the Second World War, Veale held the following positions and commands:

1936	Commanding Officer 10/50th Infantry Battalion
1936–1940	Commanding Officer 10th Infantry Battalion (Note: He was also chairman of the Air Raid Precautions Committee)
1940–1941	Commanding Officer 2/3rd Pioneer Battalion
1941	Commander Royal Engineers 7th Military District
1941–1941	Chief Engineer 7th Military District
1942	Commanding Officer Sparrow Force (Battle of Timor)
1942	Commandant of Engineer Training Centre New South Wales
1944	Commanding Officer Moresby Base Sub-Area
1944–1945	Chief Engineer 2nd Australian Army
1945	Chief Engineer 1st Australian Army
1946	Reserve of Officers honorary brigadier

== Post-war and retirement ==
Veale was appointed town clerk in January 1947, and retired in November 1965.

He died on 17 August 1971, aged 76, in North Adelaide and was cremated.

== Honours and awards ==
- Commander of the Order of the British Empire (CBE) – 10 June 1954
- Military Cross (MC) – 1 February 1919
- Distinguished Conduct Medal (DCM) – 1918
- Efficiency Decoration (ED)
- Fellow of the Royal Australian Planning Institute. He was federal president (1954–55).
- Fellow of the Institute of Municipal Administration
