= North Adelaide Golf Course =

Golf course in Adelaide, South Australia

- Location in Australia Location in South Australia Location in greater Adelaide Location in the City of Adelaide
- 34.91°S 138.59°E

Club information
- Location: North Adelaide, South Australia, Australia
- Established: 1890 (club), 136 years ago 1905 (North); 1950 (South); 1960 (Par 3)
- Type: Public
- Total holes: 54
- Greens: Bent grass
- Fairways: Kikuyu grass
- Website: northadelaidegolf.com.au

North Course
- Par: 69
- Length: 4,534 m (4,958 yd)

South Course
- Par: 71
- Length: 5,884 m (6,435 yd)

Par 3
- Par: 54

North Adelaide Golf Course is a golf course in Adelaide, South Australia. The golf course is situated in the park lands which surround the City of Adelaide. The site consists of three courses: a North course, South course, and an 18 hole Par 3 course.

== History ==
Before 1870, there is no known record of golf having been played in South Australia. Sir James Fergusson was appointed as governor of South Australia in 1868, and upon his arrival in Adelaide in 1869 set about establishing Adelaide's first golf club with David Murray and several other men. This golf club played its inaugural game of golf on 15 May 1870, with two rounds of a seven-hole course in what is now Park 16 (Victoria Park / Pakapakanthi) of the Adelaide park lands. A nine-hole course was briefly established, but ultimately this early golf club was to be short lived, becoming defunct around 1876 following the departure of Governor Fergusson in 1873.

The North Adelaide Golf Club was formed in 1890 by William Pope and a group of professional men who lived in North Adelaide and the surrounding areas. This club played on a nine-hole course established at Montefiore Hill in modern-day Park 27 (Bonython Park / Tulya Wardli) of the Adelaide park lands. Cows, which had the run of the park lands at the time, were a frequent hazard on this early course. Fences were erected around the greens to prevent damage from grazing cattle, and local rules allowed golfers to take a mulligan if the fencing interfered with a shot. Players were also permitted to lift their ball from cow pats without incurring a penalty stroke.

In 1905, the North Adelaide Golf Course was officially opened as a municipal course. In 1921 the Adelaide City Council took over the original 9-hole course, extending it to 18-holes and creating the second public course of its kind in Australia (after Moore Park in Sydney). In 1950, holes on the existing course were reshuffled as the second 18-hole course was constructed in modern-day Park 1 (Possum Park / Pirltawardli). In 1959 the names of the courses were changed from No.1 and No.2 to North and South, respectively. In 1960 the 18 hole Par 3 course was opened as the first of its kind in Australia. Several holes have been realigned in the intervening years, and club membership waxed and waned. In 2005 the North Adelaide Golf Club celebrated its 100th year as a municipal golf club.

== Redevelopment ==
In 2025, the Malinauskas Labor state government announced a $45 million redevelopment plan to upgrade the North Adelaide Golf Course to a "world-class" standard capable of hosting major international tournaments, such as LIV Golf. To enable the redevelopment, the state government passed the North Adelaide Golf Course Act, which took control of the land from the Adelaide City Council and bypassed standard state planning and environmental laws.

The project faced significant community and political backlash, including over the planned removal 585 trees, including historic River Red Gums and Sugar Gums in Possum Park / Pirltawardli (Park 1). In May 2026, protesters engaged in direct action by chaining themselves to machinery and gates at the War Memorial Drive entrance during the tree clearing, resulting in eight arrests by South Australia Police. A 78 year old former Adelaide City Council Citizen of the Year, Mij Tanith, was arrested after entering the redevelopment site with her walking frame. She later received no conviction for the offence.

A protester standing next to tree removals in the Adelaide Park Lands.

On May 13, 2026, more than 2,000 people attended a "Stop the Chop" rally outside Parliament House.

The Adelaide City Council unanimously opposed the state government's forced intervention. Led by Lord Mayor Jane Lomax-Smith, the council passed motions appealing to the Federal Department of Climate Change, Energy, the Environment and Water, seeking an emergency investigation into whether the tree clearing violated the national Environment Protection and Biodiversity Conservation Act (EPBC Act).

In June 2026, a public servant Edwin Kemp Attrill and Kaurna traditional owner Janette Milera launched a Federal Court action to halt the works and have the redevelopment referred to the Federal Environment Minister Murray Watt for assessment. The trial commenced in August 2026, before Justice Natalie Charlesworth.

On 19 August 2026, protesters marched to Parliament House to present a petition of 43,000 physical signatures against the development, tabled by parliamentary clerks.

== Current Features ==
South Course

The South Course is a Par 71 measuring in at 5884 meters in length. From the women's tees, the course is a 5404-metre Par 73. The course features a variety of holes, from Par 3s to Par 5s. Mature trees line the Santa Ana couch tees, Kikuyu grass fairways, and Bent grass greens.

North Course

The North Course is a Par 69 measuring in at 4534 metres in length. From the women's tees the course is a 4320 metre Par 70. It hosts a mix of short, tight holes and longer, open fairways.

Par 3 Course

The North Adelaide Golf Course Par 3 sits between the River Torrens and War Memorial Drive, and hosts 18 holes ranging in length from 56 to 140 metres. Tee's are of synthetic turf while the fairways and greens are Kikuyu grass, and Bent grass as in the North and South Courses.
