= Veale Gardens =

Park in Adelaide, South Australia

- Veale Gardens in 2026
- Interactive map of Veale Gardens
- Type: Public gardens
- Location: Adelaide, South Australia, Australia
- Coordinates: 34.9367°S 138.5972°E
- Area: 9.6 ha (24 acres)
- Established: 1963
- Designer: William Veale
- Etymology: William Veale
- Operator: City of Adelaide

Veale Gardens is part of the Adelaide Parklands throughout and surrounding the City of Adelaide. It is located in the South Parklands surrounded by Greenhill and Peacock Roads, South Terrace, and Sir Lewis Cohen Avenue. The gardens can be entered by entrances on South Terrace.

Veale Gardens is named after William Charles Douglas Veale, who was Adelaide's Town Clerk from January 1947 to November 1965, and close friend of mayor A. C. Rymill.

== Features ==
Featuring a garden of roses with over 50 varieties of rose on display, the gardens include two rose beds containing the City of Adelaide rose, located at the South Terrace entrance, and Queen Adelaide rose, located at the corner of South Terrace and Sir Lewis Cohen Avenue. There are many walks through the parks taking you through gardens of water features, past the greenhouse, and through more lush shady areas. The gardens are also home to the Adelaide Pavilion restaurant and function centre, and is a popular location for weddings and wedding photography shoots.

== Meeting place ==
For many years, Veale Gardens had a reputation as a gay beat. There was much debate over the years about whether to police the area more closely in response to public complaints about loitering and lewd behaviour, or to provide a safer and more amenable meeting place for gay men.

In the absence of any agreement, in late 2006 the public toilets were bulldozed and new toilets built on the South Terrace frontage. The entrance off Sir Lewis Cohen Avenue was closed and the street returned to park land to reduce late night parking.

In more recent times Veale Gardens and adjacent parkland again became controversial because of its popularity with visiting Aboriginal people, looking for a cheap, safe, and convenient place to camp.
