= West Terrace, Adelaide =

Street in Adelaide, South Australia

West Terrace South Australia
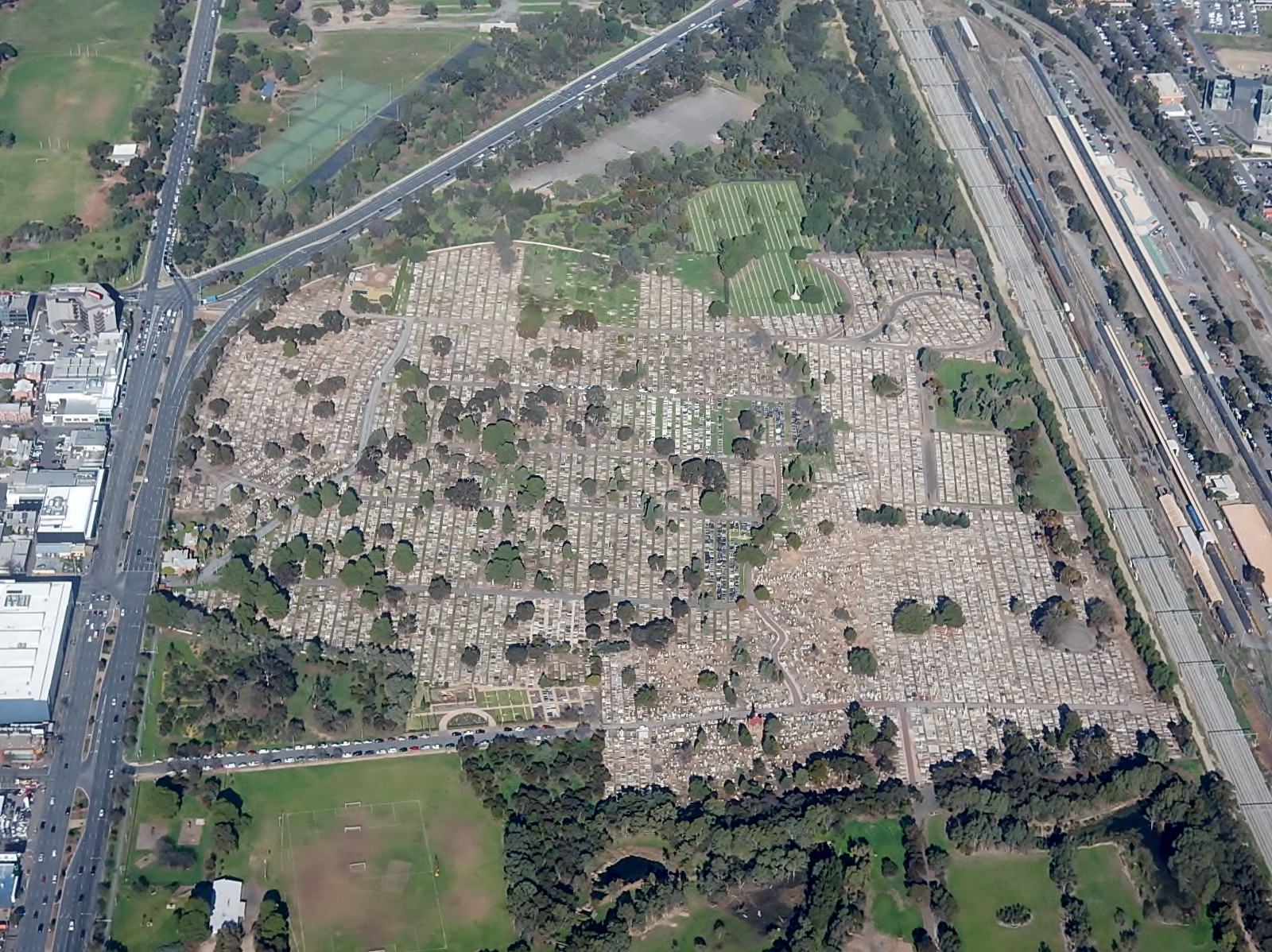
- South-facing aerial view of West Terrace Cemetery, westerly adjacent to West Terrace and northerly adjacent to Anzac Highway
- Coordinates: 34.922091°S 138.587265°E (North end); 34.936285°S 138.588442°E (South end)

General information
- Type: Street
- Location: Adelaide city centre
- Length: 1.6 km (1.0 mi)
- Opened: 1837
- Former route number: A21 (1998–2017)

Major junctions
- North end: North Terrace; Port Road; Adelaide
- Currie Street; Grote Street; Sir Donald Bradman Drive; Sturt Street
- South end: South Terrace; Goodwood Road; Anzac Highway; Adelaide

Location(s)
- LGA(s): City of Adelaide

West Terrace is a street in Adelaide, South Australia. It is the westernmost street of the Adelaide city centre. It ends at North Terrace and South Terrace, and connects to Port Road and Anzac Highway.

The southern end of West Terrace, where it connects to Goodwood Road and Anzac Highway, is home to a Rydges Hotel and the West Terrace Cemetery. The northern reaches are occupied by several car dealerships, and hq, Adelaide's largest nightclub. The remainder of West Terrace is occupied by fast food outlets and smaller shops.

The Royal Adelaide Hospital is also located near West Terrace, having moved from premises at the eastern end of North Terrace in 2018.

West Terrace is also the location of Adelaide High School, South Australia's oldest government high school.

Traffic on West Terrace can be very heavy, as it is a major route in and out of the city, and some areas are designated traffic black spots.

There is a tram stop at the junction of West and North Terraces near the Royal Adelaide Hospital.
