= War Memorial Drive =

Road in Adelaide, South Australia

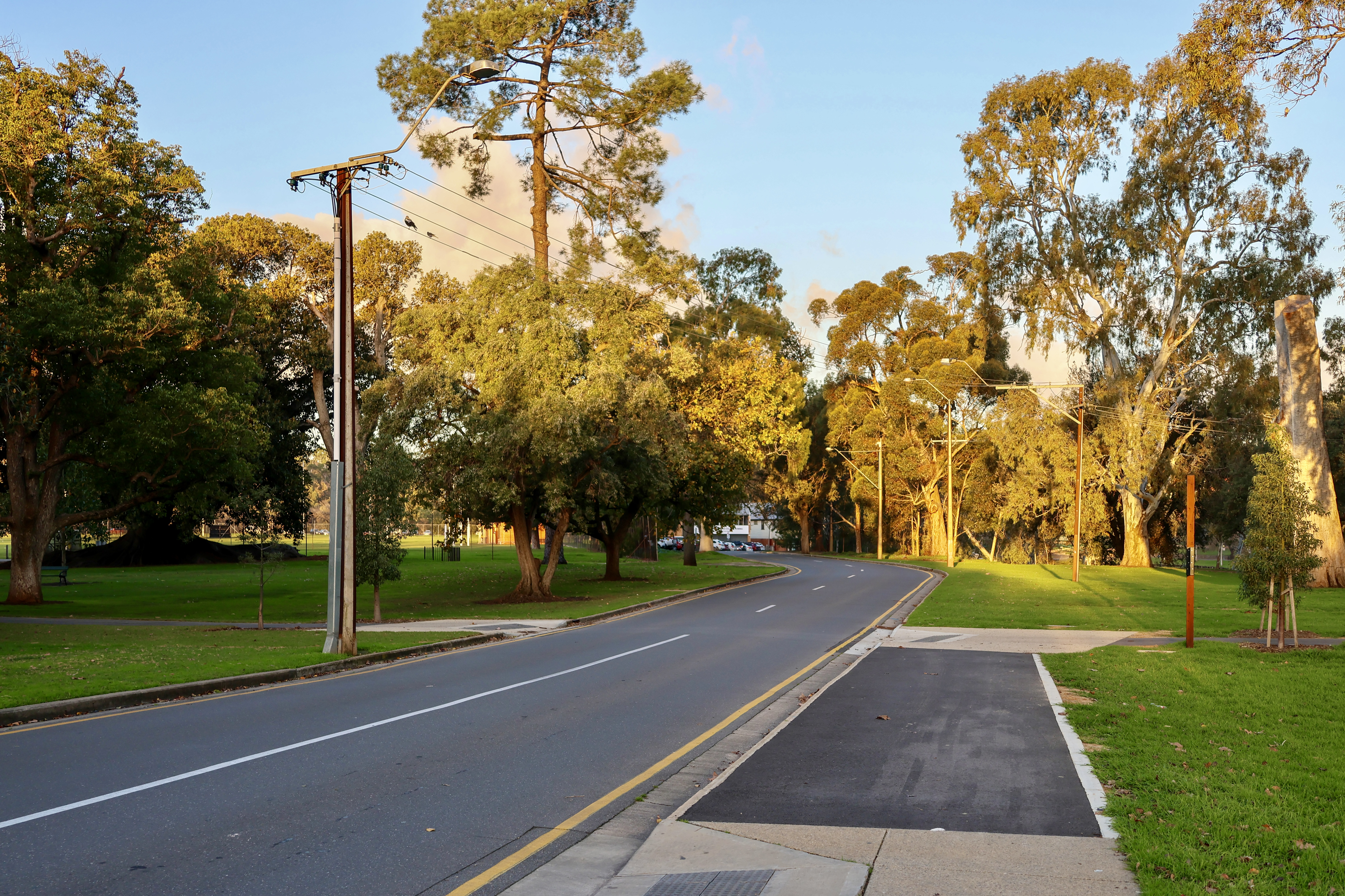
- The street looking east in North Adelaide
- Coordinates: AUSTRALIA 34.909053541256824°S 138.61154881622264°E (East end); AUSTRALIA 34.90306828892873°S 138.5843622135706°E (West end)

General information
- Type: Street
- Location: Adelaide city centre

Major junctions

Location(s)
- LGA(s): City of Adelaide

Highway system
- Highways in Australia; National Highway • Freeways in Australia

War Memorial Drive is a connecting road in the South Australian capital of Adelaide. It starts from Bundeys Road near Princes Highway, runs in a western direction following the River Torrens, past the Adelaide Zoo, Adelaide University, Adelaide Oval and past Bonython Park into North Adelaide. Along the road, there are numerous statues of significant Australians and war heroes. The drive was dedicated and named after the heroes and victims of World War I.

== History ==
The first section of the road, between Frome Road and Sir Edwin Smith Avenue, was opened in 1919. It was built by returned soldiers, with funding from Adelaide City Council, the Federal Government, and a donation from Lord Mayor Charles Glover. The second stage of the road, from King William Road to Montefiore Road was constructed in 1920.
