= King William Street, Adelaide =

Street in Adelaide, South Australia

King William Street King William Road, Peacock Road South Australia
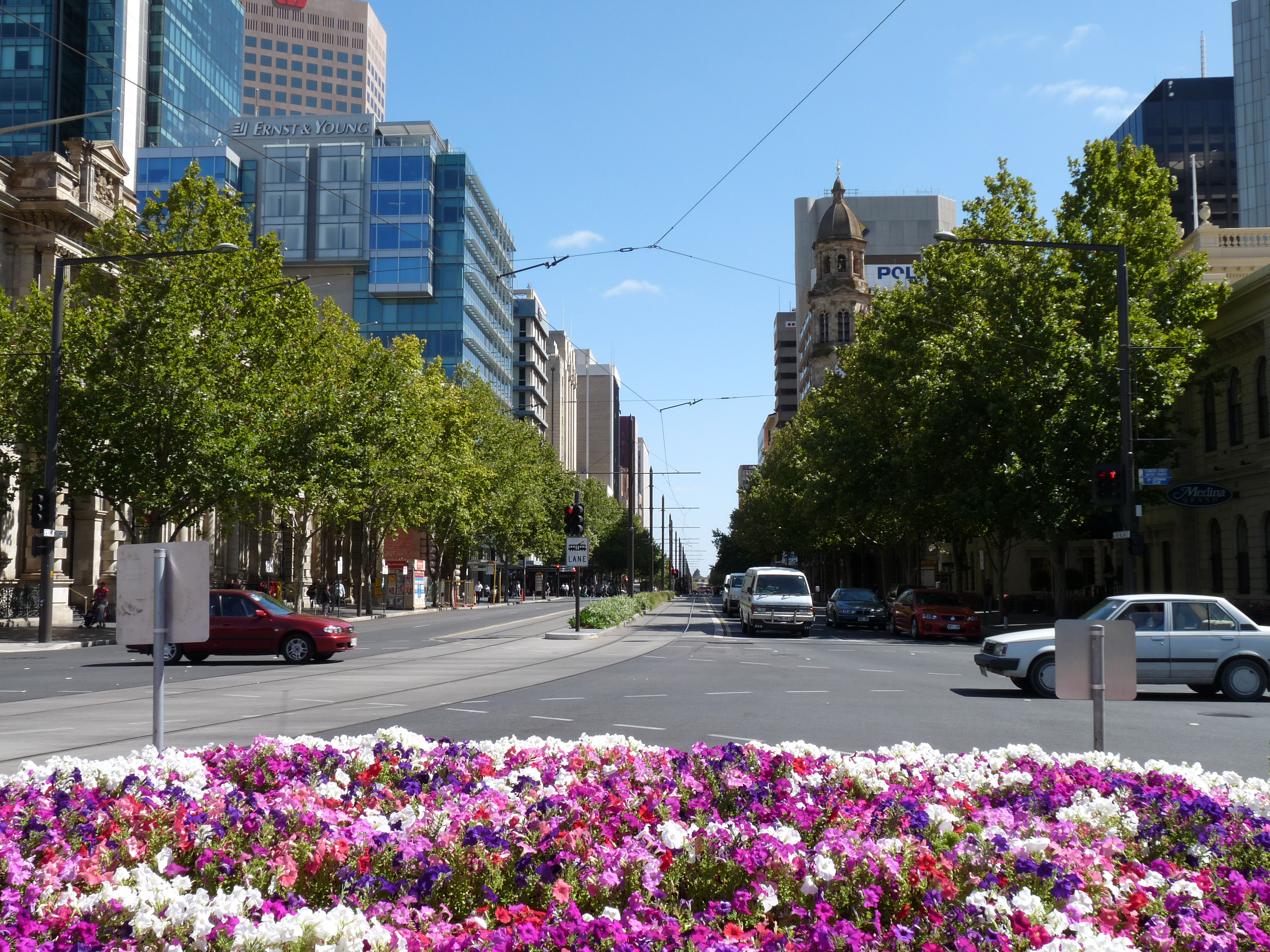
- King William Street, looking north from Victoria Square, February 2009
- Coordinates: 34.909398°S 138.597112°E (North end); 34.960504°S 138.600395°E (South end)

General information
- Type: Street
- Location: Adelaide city centre
- Length: 5.9 km (3.7 mi)
- Opened: 1837

Major junctions
- North end: O'Connell Street; North Adelaide
- North Terrace; Currie Street; Grenfell Street; Victoria Square; Grote Street; Wakefield Street; Sturt Street; Halifax Street; South Terrace; Greenhill Road
- South end: Northgate Street; Unley Park, Adelaide

Location(s)
- LGA(s): City of Adelaide

King William Street is the part of a major arterial road that traverses the CBD and centre of Adelaide, continuing as King William Road to the north of North Terrace and south of Greenhill Road; between South Terrace and Greenhill Road it is called Peacock Road. At approximately 40 metres (130 ft) wide, King William Street is the widest main street of all the Australian state capital cities. Named after King William IV in 1837, it is historically considered one of Adelaide's high streets, for its focal point of businesses, shops and other prominent establishments. The Glenelg tram line runs along the middle of the street through the city centre.

== History ==
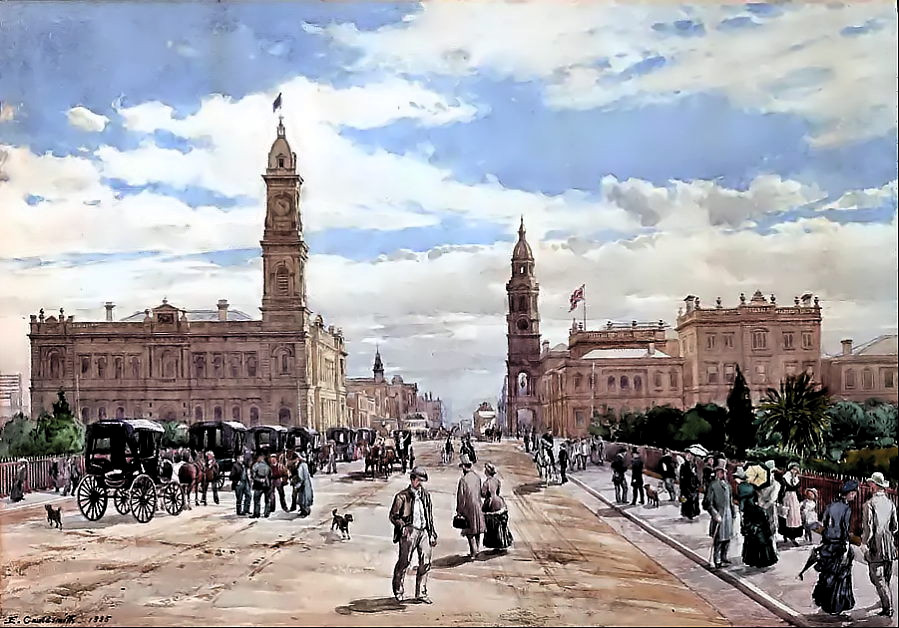
King William Street in 1885, by Edmund Gouldsmith

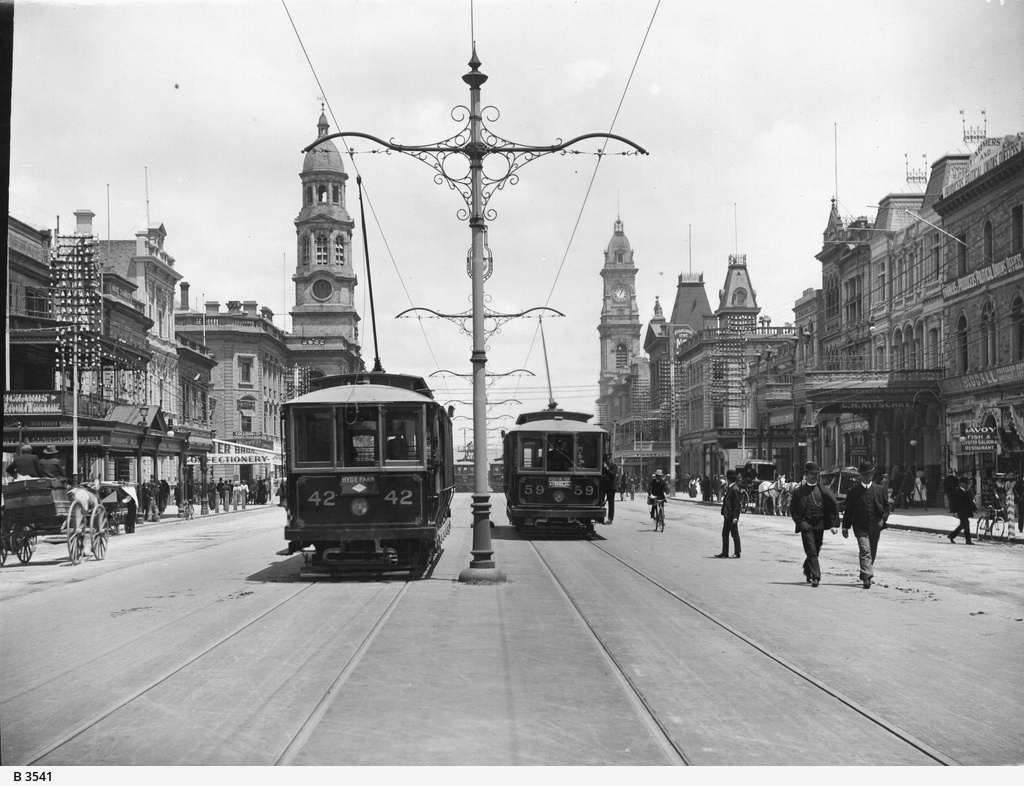
King William Street in 1909

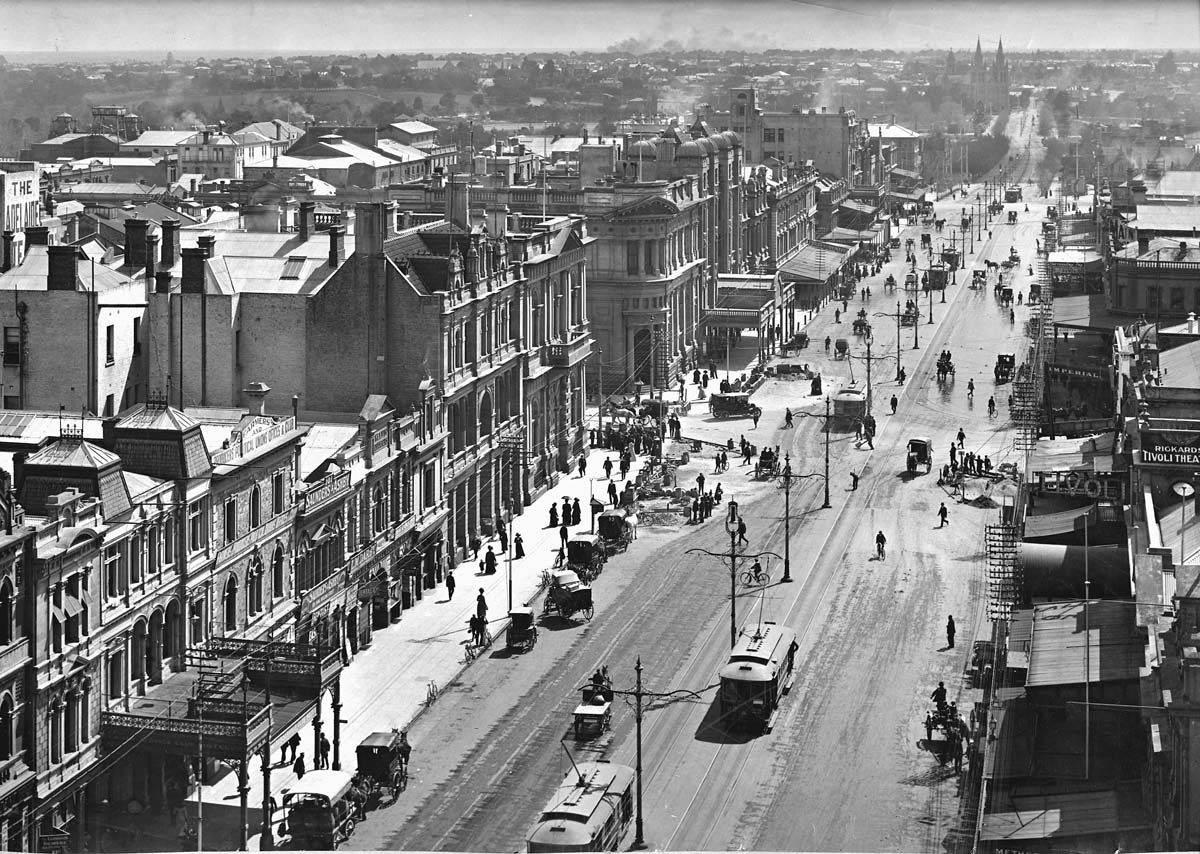
King William Street in 1914

King William Street was named by the Street Naming Committee on 23 May 1837 after King William IV, the then reigning monarch, who died within a month. It is historically considered one of Adelaide's high streets, for its focal point of businesses, shops and other prominent establishments.

In August 1977, the first bus lane in Adelaide opened along King William Street from Victoria Square to North Terrace.

== Description ==
The name King William is applied several times to the continuous stretch of road that begins in the inner southern suburbs and terminates in North Adelaide. Where it runs through the Adelaide city centre from South Terrace to North Terrace, it is named "King William Street"; elsewhere it is named "King William Road".

It starts in the south as King William Road, at the north edge of Heywood Park in Unley Park, and runs through Hyde Park and Unley to Greenhill Road. The road through the south parklands is named Peacock Road after Caleb Peacock who was Mayor of Adelaide from 1875 to 1877. Through the Adelaide city centre it is King William Street and continues north from North Terrace as King William Road to Brougham Place, North Adelaide.

At approximately 40 metres (130 ft) wide, King William Street is the widest main street of all the Australian State capital cities.

The road continues north to National Highway 1 as O'Connell Street, but the name King William is not again used. The northern section called King William Road (connecting the Adelaide city centre with North Adelaide) passes several of Adelaide's landmarks, including Government House, Elder Park, the Adelaide Festival Centre, Adelaide Oval and St Peter's Cathedral. The section from North Terrace over the Adelaide Bridge to Pennington Terrace was named King William Road at the opening of the bridge in 1877.

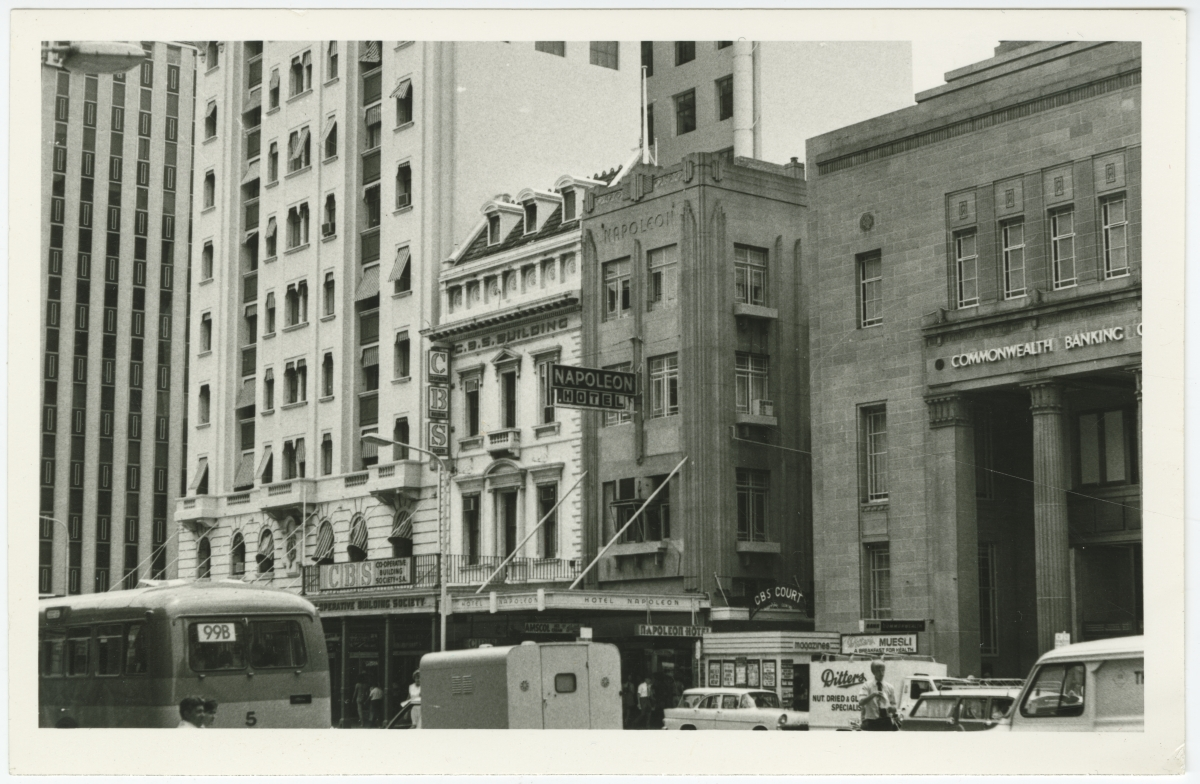
King William Street in 1973. The elaborate Commonwealth Bank building on the right has since been demolished, as have the two buildings next to it.

Until the 1960s, trams used King William Street as a major backbone of the network, with a grand union junction at North Terrace and only one pair of tracks missing between Grenfell and Currie Streets. When most of the tram lines were dismantled in the 1950s, only the Glenelg tram line remained, and it used King William Street between South Terrace and its terminus at Victoria Square.

In 2007, the tram line was extended to run the full length of King William Street again, turning left onto North Terrace and terminating at Adelaide railway station, later extended westwards via Port Road to the Adelaide Entertainment Centre. In 2018, another expansion of the tram routes replaced the turn at the intersection of North Terrace and King William Street with a junction, and a short spur to a stop outside the Adelaide Festival Centre as well as an eastward extension along North Terrace to the Adelaide Botanic Garden. Tracks go in all four directions, but not all turning movements are supported.

== Historic buildings ==
=== King's Theatre / Ballroom ===
The King's Theatre, at no. 318, was designed by the brothers-in-law David Williams (1856–1940) and Charles Thomas Good (1864–1926), who, working in their practice Williams & Good, also designed the New Tivoli Theatre (later Her Majesty's. The theatre was located on the north-east corner of King William and Carrington Streets, with main entrances on both, opened in February 1911 and closed in 1928. It had a seating capacity of 1500, on seats upholstered in blue velvet. Its proscenium arch was 26 ft (7.9 m) by 28 ft (8.5 m). It was built by Messrs Tolley. Intended mainly for vaudeville performances, the theatre was however reported to be a poor venue, "plagued by poor sightlines and inadequate ventilation". Adelaide Repertory Theatre staged at least two performances there, in 1919. The ceiling and other features of the theatre were damaged by fire on 26 September 1927.

The theatre was sold by Majestic Amusements (who had bought it from Fuller Theatres Ltd) in February 1928 to Mr P. J. A. Lawrence, and closed for remodelling on 28 March 1928, when it was completely rebuilt into a two-storey building. A large ballroom occupied the lower floor, (Note: Needs checking - photo looks as if it was more likely to be on the upper floor.) buffered with rubber, The building was opened as the Kings Ballroom on 22 August 1928 (also referred to as the King's Theatre Ballroom, and Golden Ballroom). With its entrance in Carrington Street, the ballroom was open to "suitably attired" members of the public each Wednesday and Saturday night, and competitions were held there.

A serious fire forced closure in 1975, after which it remained vacant for several years, eventually being transformed into legal offices in the 1980s.

=== Majestic / Warner Theatre ===
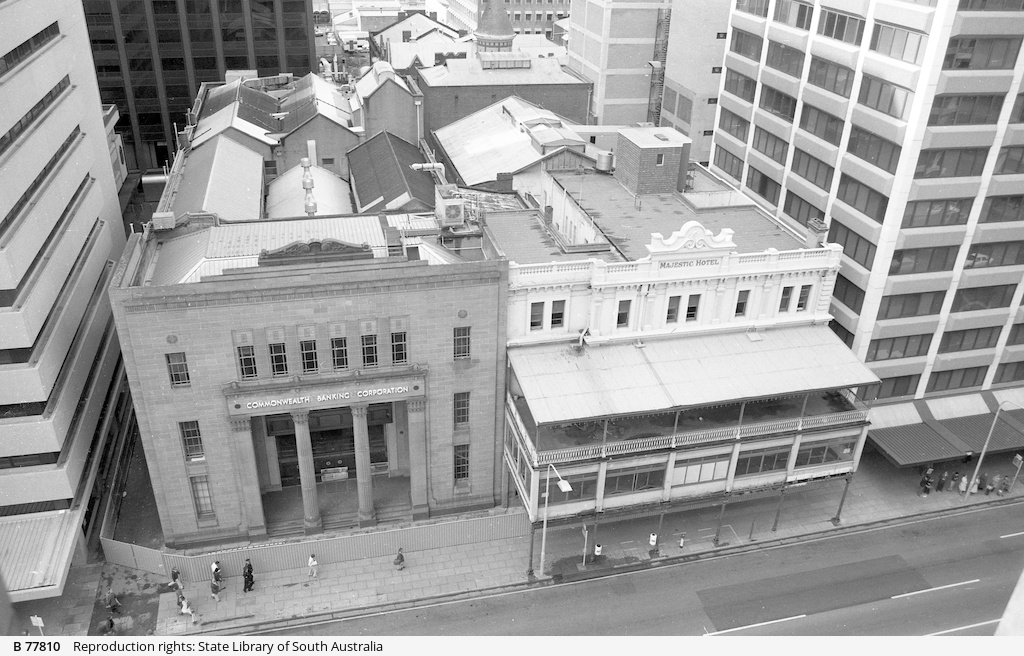
Commonwealth Bank & Warner Theatre (formerly Majestic), July 1980. Both buildings have since been demolished.

The building at 100 King William Street was also designed by Williams & Good. It was constructed in 1848, comprising a hotel and concert hall commissioned by proprietor George White and designed by George Strickland Kingston. White's Adelaide Assembly and Concert Room opened on 26 June 1856. It was refitted as Garner's Theatre (proprietor Alfred Garner) in 1886, with decorations by George Gordon. It was taken over by new proprietor Tommy Hudson, and renamed Hudson's Bijou in 1892. In 1900, Harry Rickards purchased the building and reopened it as the Tivoli Theatre, (Note: Not to be confused with the New Tivoli, built in 1913, later Her Majesty's Theatre.) which operated briefly as a cinema, called the Star Theatre.

The Majestic Theatre opened as a picture theatre on 3 June 1916, having undergone a conversion costing £18,000. It stood alongside the Majestic Hotel, and was described as "the most modern theatre in Adelaide" in that year. It was one of the city's leading picture theatres until 1967, when it was renovated and became the Celebrity Theatre and Restaurant. Two years later it was reinvented as a cinema and live theatre, called the Warner Theatre, owned by City Projects Pty Ltd from 1969. Notable performances at the Warner include the Eleo Pomare Dance Company of New York City in 1972, Don's Party in 1975, and The Rocky Horror Show in 1977. Rocky Horror only ran for around two months as it was not a successful production.

The theatre finally closed on 31 March 1979. Both the old theatre and hotel and the Commonwealth Bank buildings (both on the eastern side of the street) were demolished in 1980.

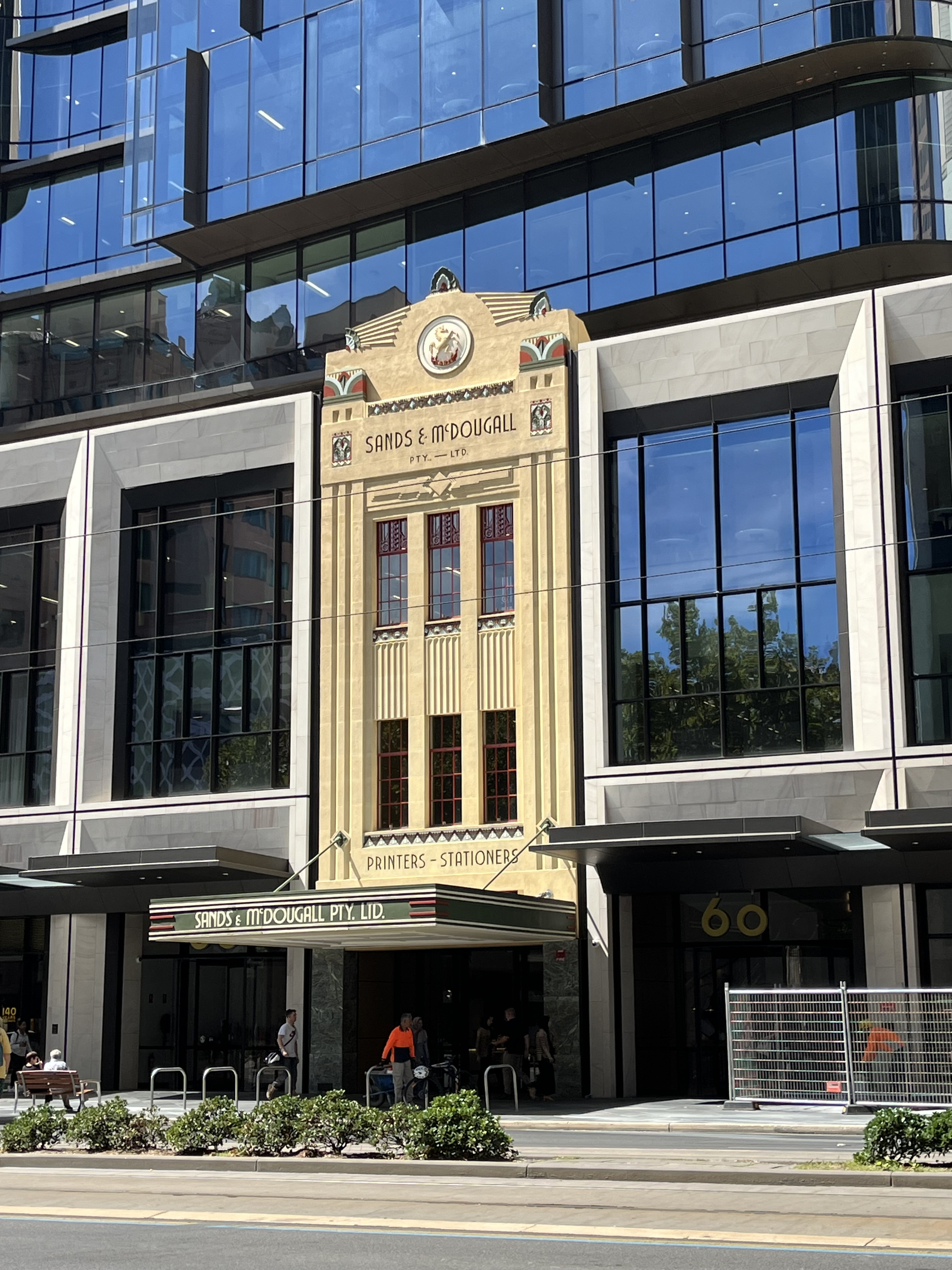
The Art Deco facade of Sands & McDougall building, no. 64

=== Sands & McDougall building ===
The facade of the Sands & McDougall Printers and Stationers building at 64 King William Street, Adelaide is an excellent early example of Art Deco architecture in South Australia. The facade of the 19th-century neoclassical building was redesigned in 1933, and was listed on the South Australian Heritage Register in December 2020.

== Junctions and street name changes ==
Between North Terrace and South Terrace, all east-west roads change their names as they cross King William Street. It is said this is because no one was allowed to "cross the path of a monarch". Travelling south from North Terrace, the street pairs are:

West Terrace ↓		Morphett Street ↓		King William Street ↓		Pulteney Street ↓		East Terrace ↓	Designed width
	North; Terrace		North; Terrace		North; Terrace		North; Terrace		4-lane
	Hindley; Street		Hindley; Street		Rundle; Mall		Rundle; Street		2-lane
	Currie; Street	Light; Square	Currie; Street		Grenfell; Street	Hindmarsh; Square	Grenfell; Street		4-lane
	Waymouth; Street	Light; Square	Waymouth; Street		Pirie; Street	Hindmarsh; Square	Pirie; Street		2-lane
	Franklin; Street		Franklin; Street	Victoria Square	Flinders; Street		Flinders; Street		4-lane
	Grote; Street		Grote; Street	Victoria Square	Wakefield; Street		Wakefield; Street		6-lane
	Gouger; Street		Gouger; Street	Victoria Square	Angas; Street		Angas; Street		4-lane
	Wright; Street	Whitmore; Square	Wright; Street		Carrington; Street	Hurtle; Square	Carrington; Street		2-lane
	Sturt; Street	Whitmore; Square	Sturt; Street		Halifax; Street	Hurtle; Square	Halifax; Street		4-lane
	Gilbert; Street		Gilbert; Street		Gilles; Street		Gilles; Street		2-lane
	South; Terrace		South; Terrace		South; Terrace		South; Terrace		4-lane

== In popular culture ==
King William Road was referenced in the John Schumann song "Hyde Park Calling (King William Road Scene 1)" on the 1993 album True Believers.

== Gallery ==
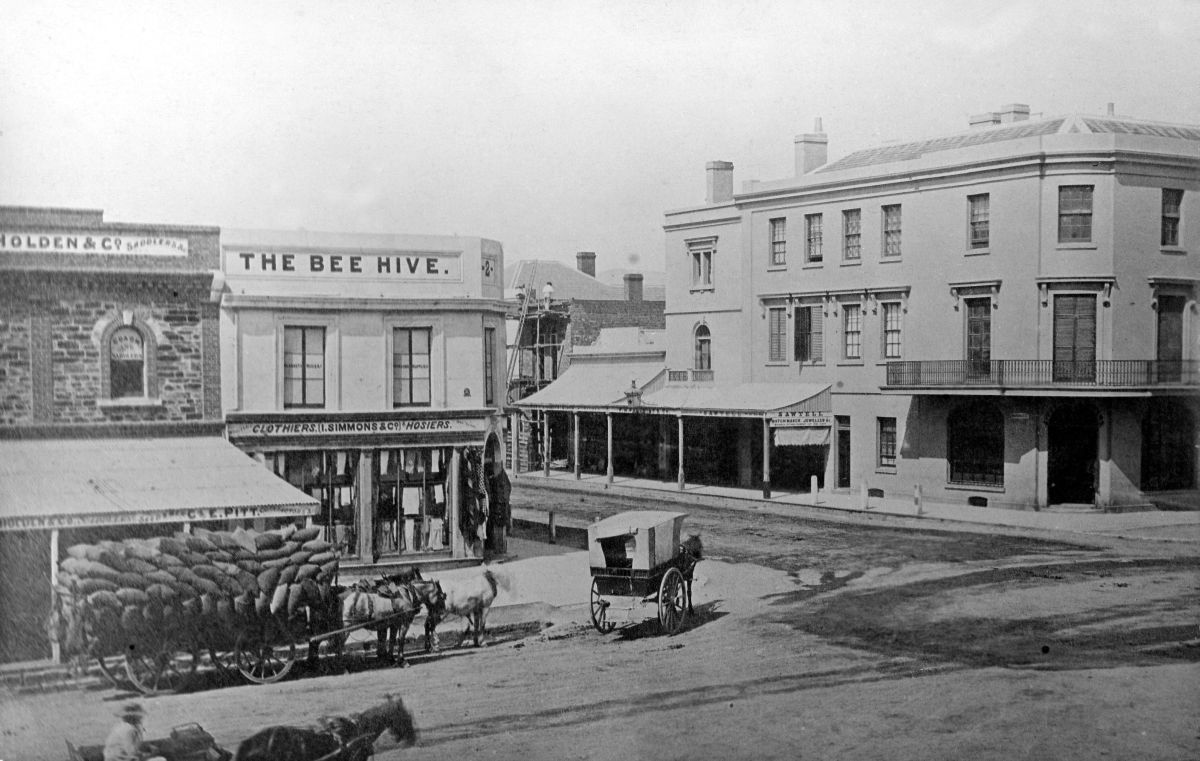
The street (running left to right), 1867

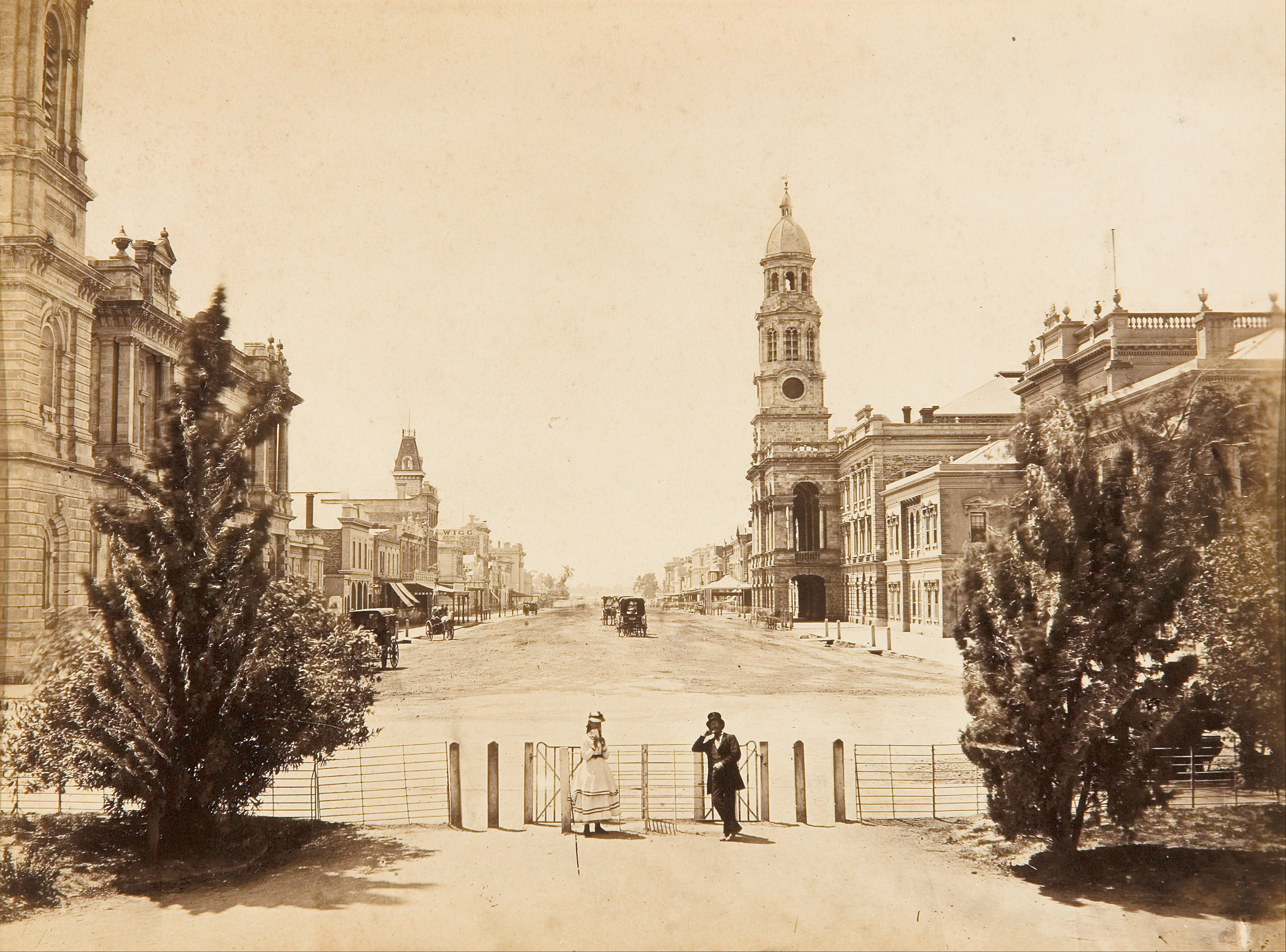
View from Victoria Square, 1870s

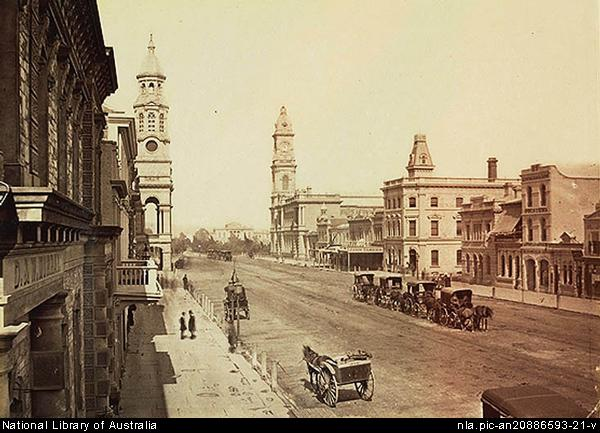
c. 1869–1889. Town Hall on left, Post Office on right

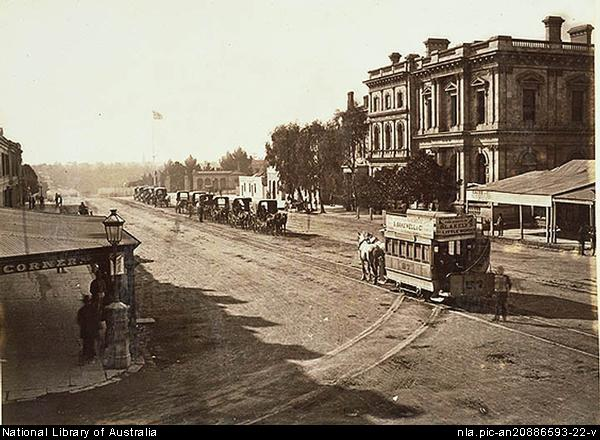
Sometime between 1869 and 1889.

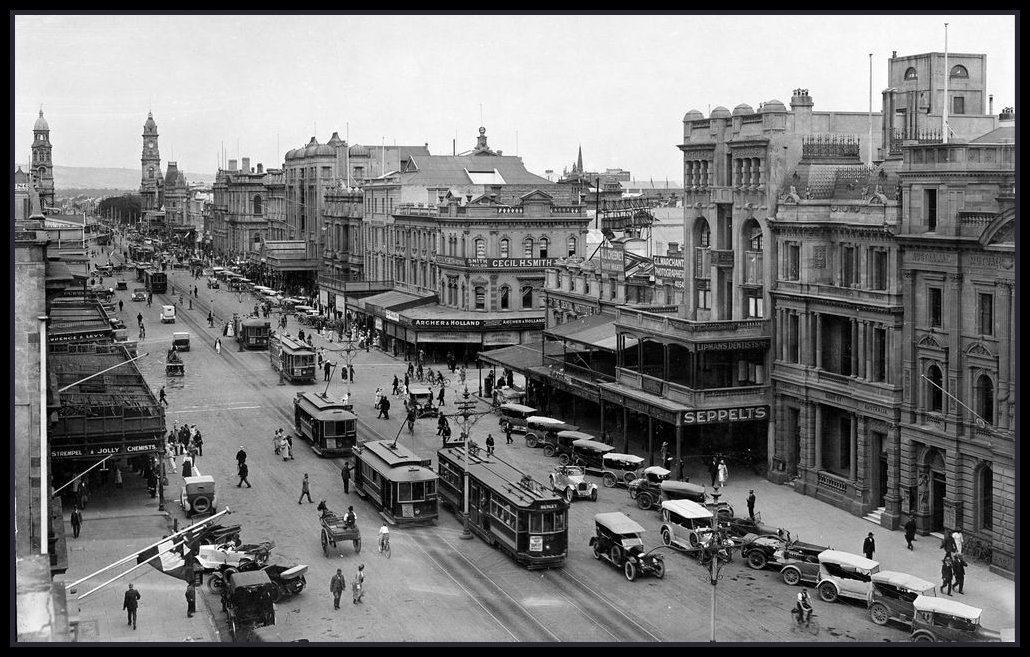
The street, 1923

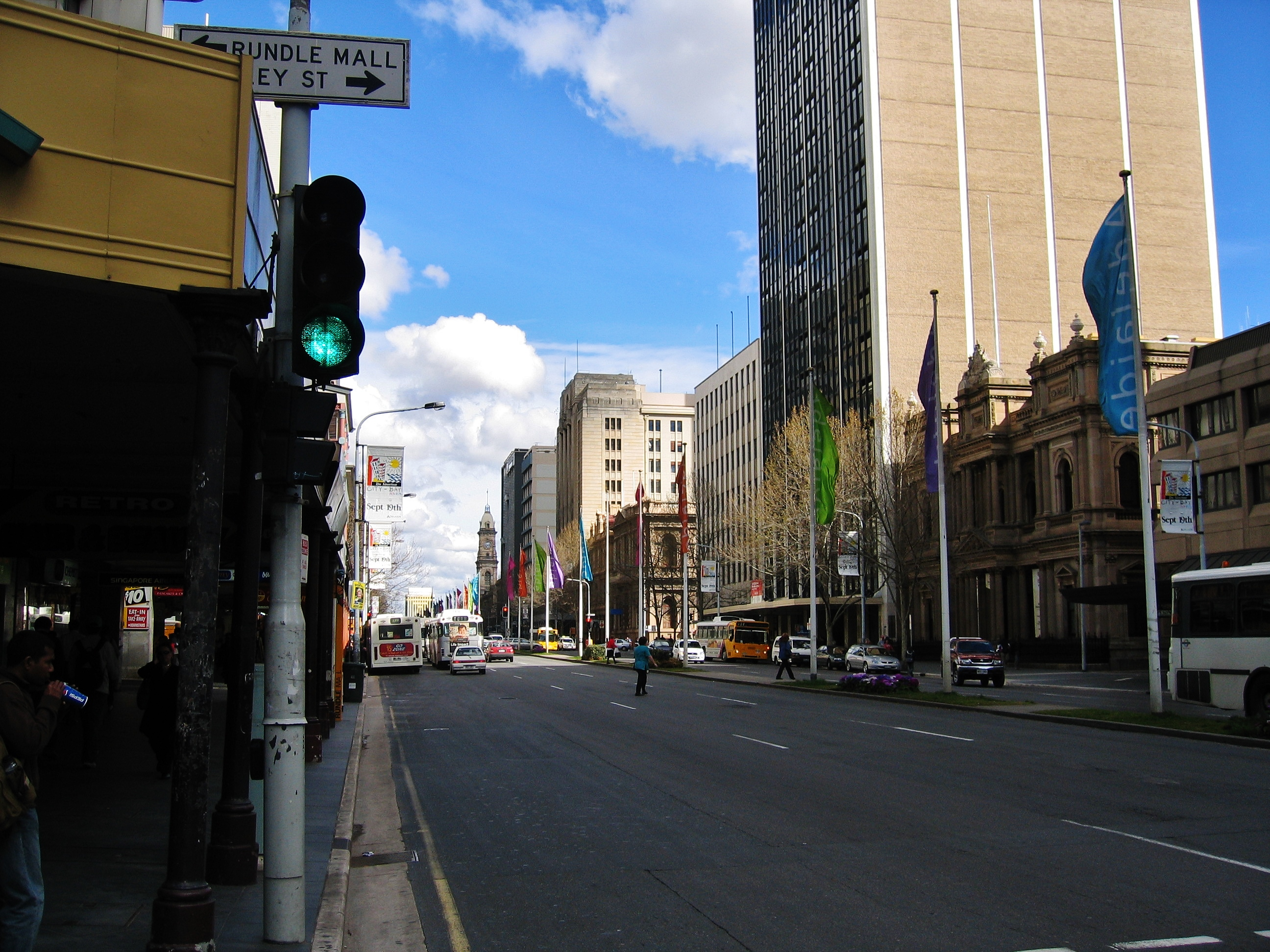
View south from Rundle Mall, 2004

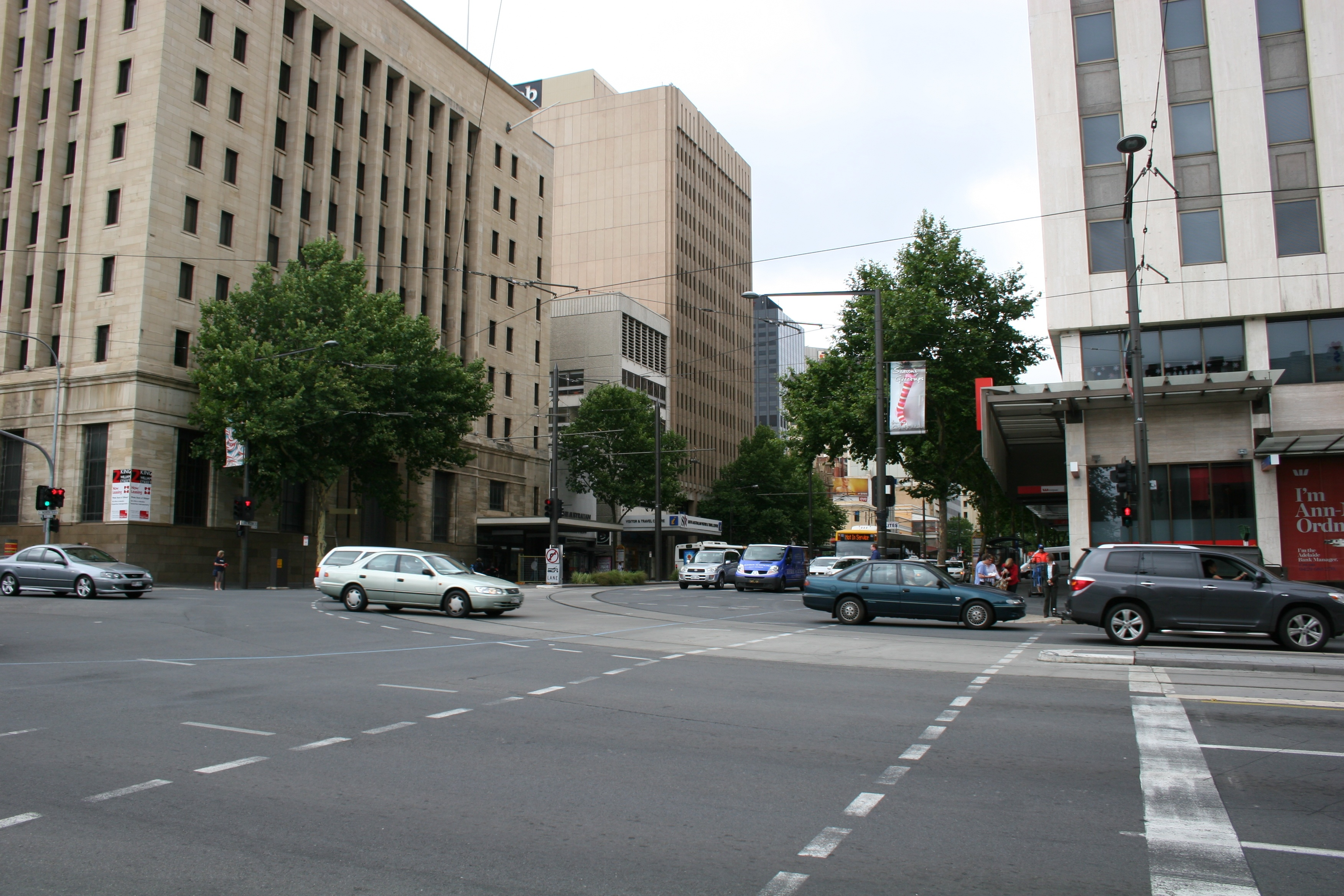
King William Street looking south, December 2010

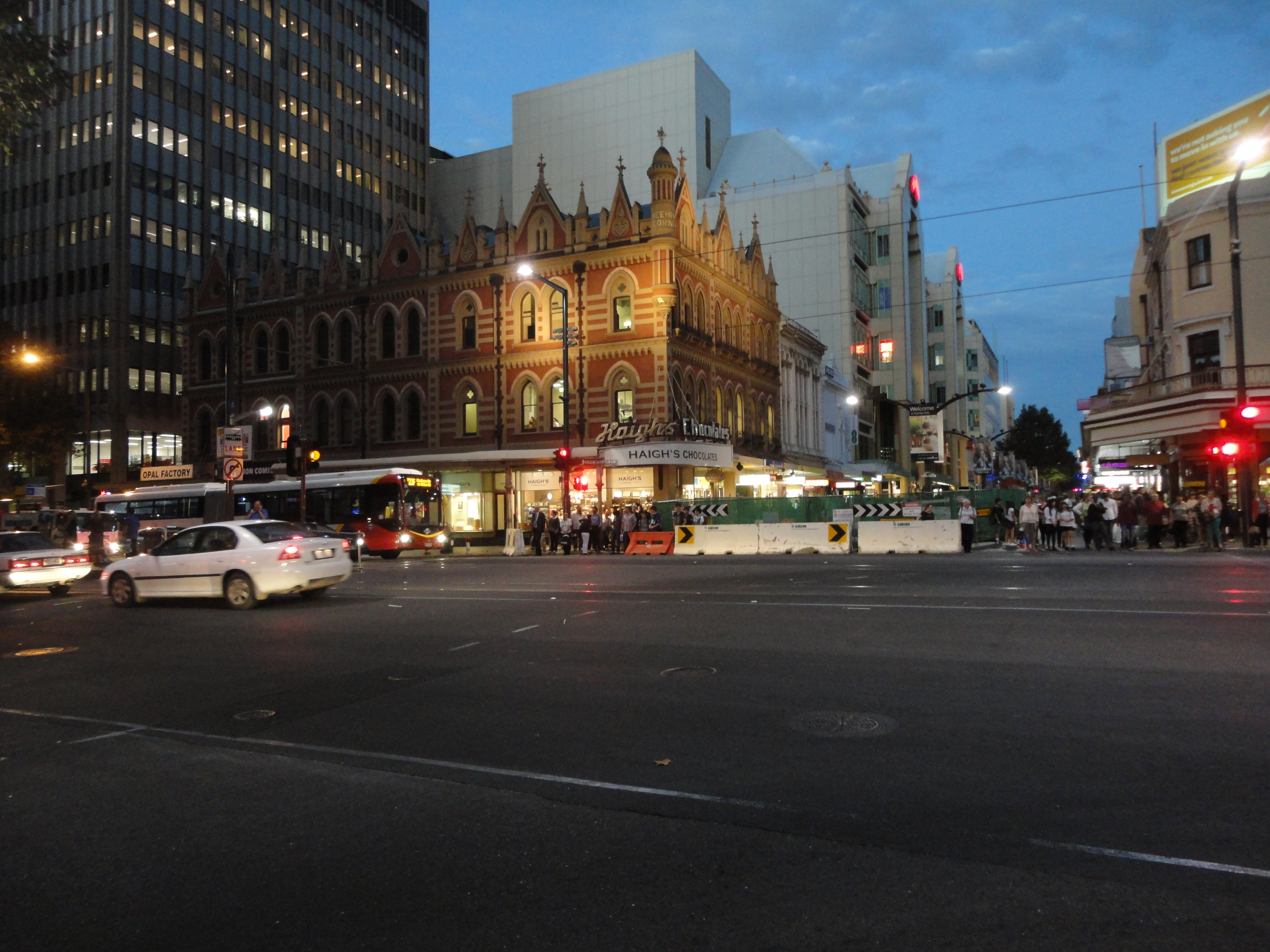
The intersection from King William Street, looking east towards Rundle Mall, 2013.

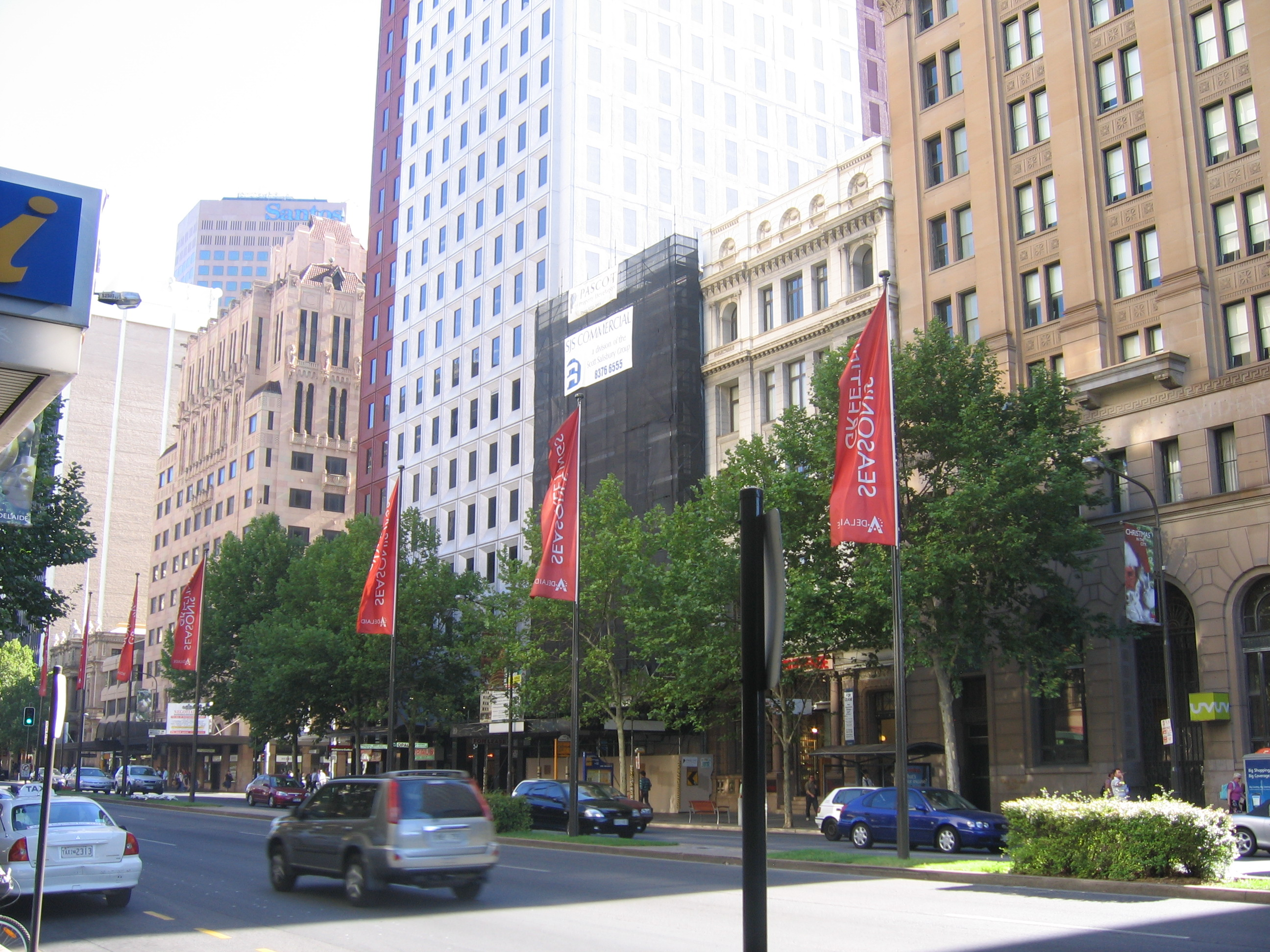
King William Street between North Terrace and Currie Street, looking south-west, November 2006

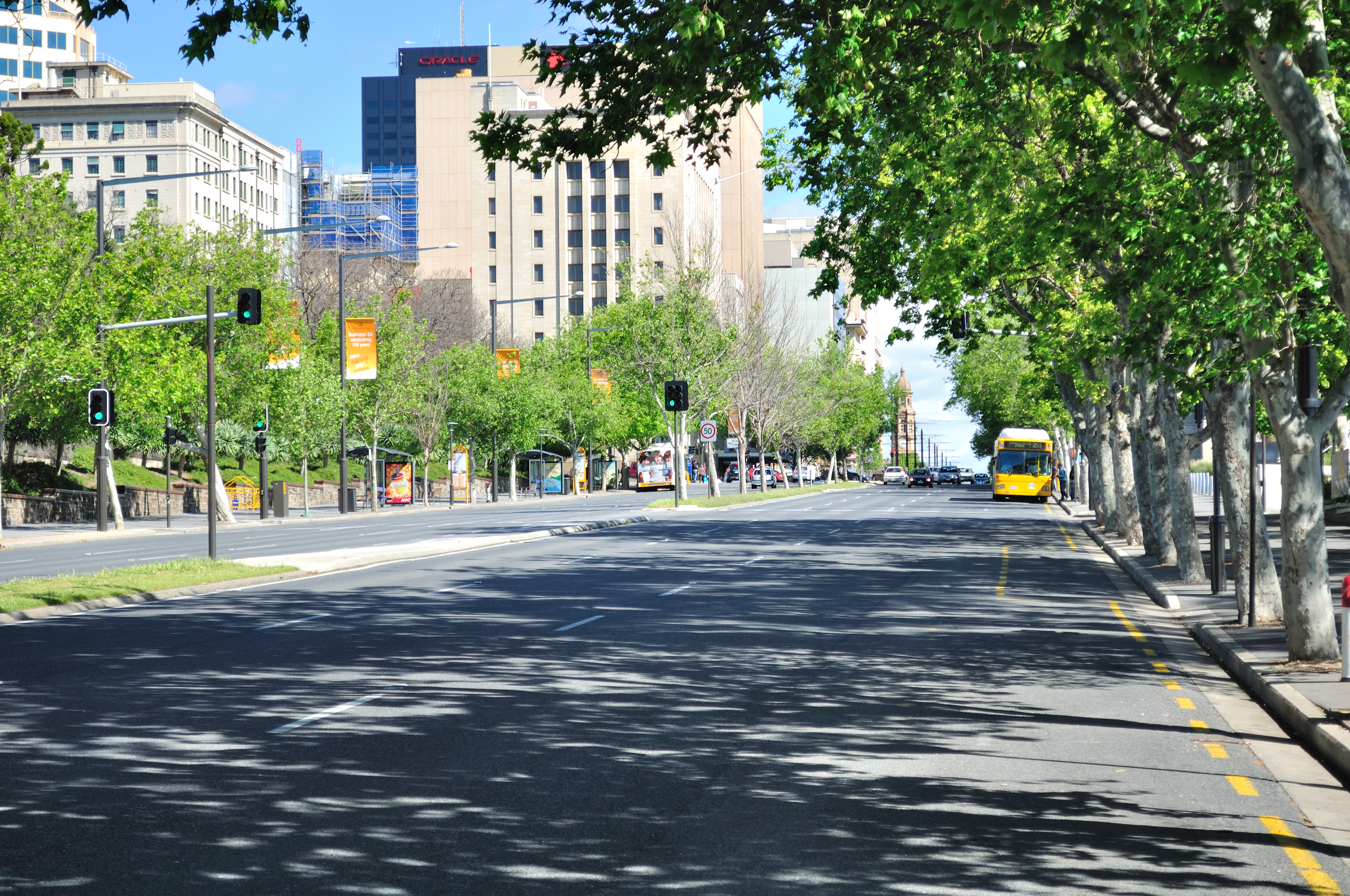
View south from the Festival Centre, before the Festival Centre tram stop was built.

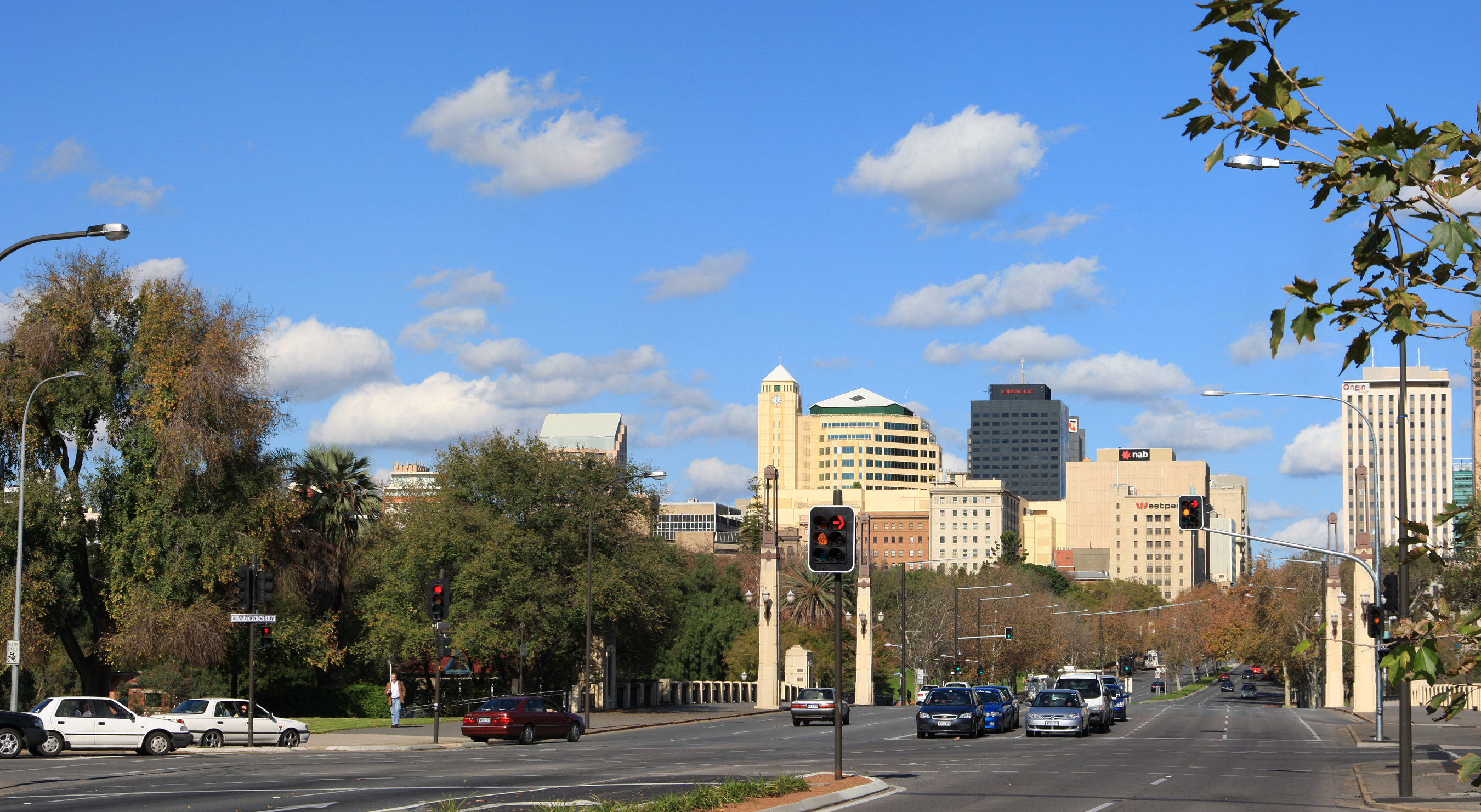
King William Road, North Adelaide, from the Adelaide Oval, looking south over the River Torrens towards North Terrace, King William Street and the Adelaide city centre, May 2009

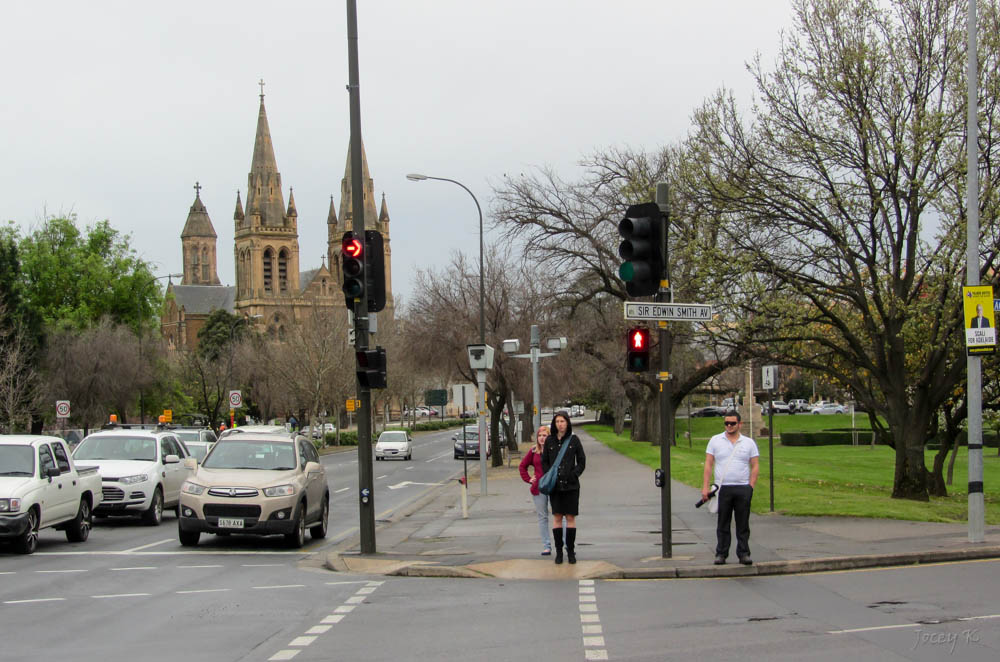
King William Street, looking north towards St Peter's Cathedral
