= G. T. Light =

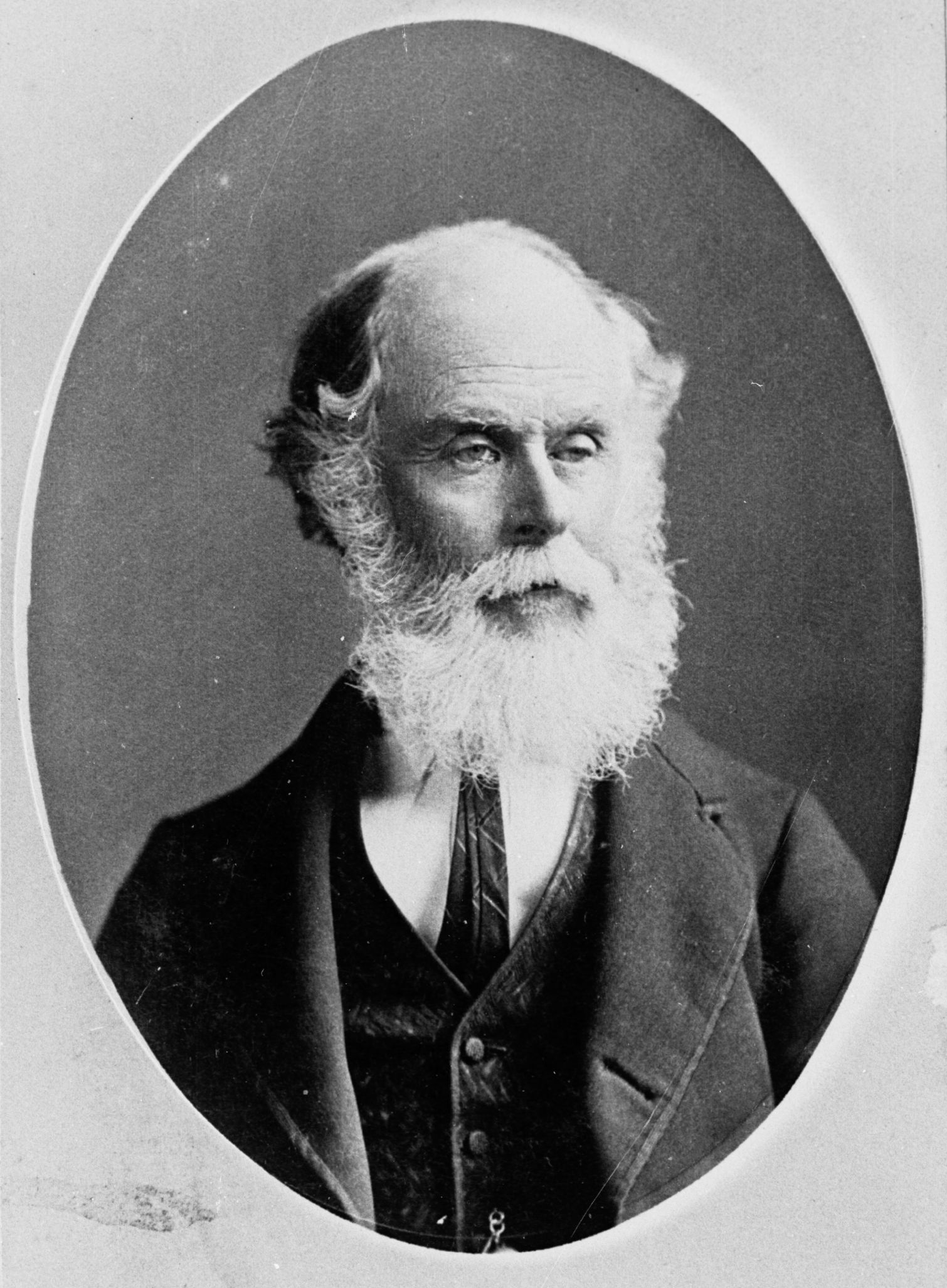
G. T. Light

George Thomas Light (1820 – 24 January 1896), commonly referred to as G. T. Light, was an organist, instrument-maker, and architect in the early days of the British colony of South Australia.

== History ==
Light was born in England in 1820, a son of music teacher Thomas Light, and christened at St Andrews Church, Clifton, on 18 September 1820. He was employed in the fields of musical instrument maker and technician, optician, modeller and engineering draftsman, as well as being a more than competent keyboard player. He emigrated to South Australia, ship unknown, arriving in 1848 or early 1849. (Note: Light was already in Adelaide in May 1849 when his cousins Arnold Alfred Light (died 1871) and Walter Light (about whom little is known) arrived by the William Hyde.) He married Marian Wilson in September 1850 at St Matthew's Church of England, Kensington; (Note: The Episcopal Church of St Matthew was consecrated by Bishop Short on 31 March 1849) they would have six children, of whom four survived infancy. He worked as a piano tuner and foundry draftsman in Adelaide.

By another account, Light was born in 1838, was employed as a musical instrument maker and draftsman at a foundry in Bristol, England, before emigrating to South Australia around 1854 (Note: This year of birth is problematical, as it entails his gaining experience as instrument maker and draftsman before emigrating at a very early age (16) if his arrival in South Australia were as late as 1854, but he had been officiating as organist for various churches since 1852.) and died in 1911. (Note: One George Light (no middle name) died in 1911, but evidence of Light's death in Western Australia in 1896 is clear.) None of these dates stands scrutiny.

Light joined the Colonial Architect’s office in 1856 as a temporary draftsman, made a permanent appointment on 1 January 1857. He became assistant architect when Edward John Woods was appointed Architect-in-Chief in 1874. In 1879 Light took leave of absence, joining J. A. Hornabrook in a partnership, with offices in Santo's Building. Light's wife died in 1882, and he left the Department in 1883. In 1884 he joined in partnership with the newly-arrived R. G. Holwell (died 1906) as Light and Holwell, at the Old Exchange. The partnership was dissolved in August 1884 and Light moved to Western Australia, where his sons had settled.

== Architect ==
Government

Light designed the royal coat of arms ornament on the Treasury building designed by Edward A. Hamilton in 1858. In 1859 Light designed the court house and police station at Goolwa. He was also credited with the police station at Auburn. In 1873 he drew formal plans for a new Parliament House to a sketch by G. S. Kingston. They were not used, but he was appointed to the panel of judges who selected the winning design from the competition which was held subsequently. In the period 1874–1878 while he was with the Engineer-in-Chiefs office, he would have been largely responsible for many of the department's designs, including the Guard House, work on the Treasury Buildings and House of Assembly Chamber, General Post Office and the Library and Museum on North Terrace. They supervised erection of German-made prefabricated Palm House in the Botanic Gardens designed by Gustav Runge and opened in 1877. They designed the North Adelaide Primary School. Light is believed to have designed the south-west section of Government House, the Jervois wing of the State Library of South Australia, the Norwood police station.

Private

No records have been found relating to his work with Hornabrook. Light and Holwell designed St Mark's Church at Woodside. Light and Holwell were architects of the Parkside post and telegraph office, an elaborate complex with an attached hall designed to accommodate 500 people. It is likely he prepared the plans for the replacement St John's church in Halifax Street where Light was the first organist. These plans were presented by Holwell alone to the church committee in December 1884, as were the plans for the tower and other improvements to St George's Church, Gawler.

== Musician ==
Light first came to public attention in September 1849, when he was giving recitals at the Pulteney Street school on Sundays after church service, presiding on the euphonicon, which instrument was reported as sounding like a pipe organ, and (erroneously) crediting its invention to Light though it may have been built by him in England before emigrating. By November 1849 he had established a workshop and showroom in Pirie Street, "adjacent Wilson's iron store" for manufacturing the euphonicon, and also had a Broadwood piano for hire.

In 1853 he had a shop on Rundle Street east, "nearly opposite the Exeter Hotel", advertising his services as piano and harmonium repairer and tuner, later having such instruments for sale. By August 1855 he was also advertising his services as a music teacher, and moved his place of business to Franklin Street east.

His first appointment as church organist was at St John's on Halifax Street until July 1852, when he moved to the Swedenborgian church on Carrington Street; at its first service playing on the euphonicon.

Light was in 1854 the first organist employed by St Andrew's Church, Walkerville, presiding at the harmonium at the Walkerville School's annual festival and the debut of the North Adelaide Choral Society and many concerts at which C. J. Kunze (died 1868) played piano, and at the Handel Festival at White's Rooms in 1859, perhaps his last public concert.

== Other activities ==
In 1859 he was Adelaide agent for the firm of L. P. Casella, (more info here) optical instrument manufacturer.

== Personal ==
Light has been named as a son of Colonel William Light. Their relationship was not so close however: the fathers of G. T. Light and his cousins Arnold Alfred Light and Walter Light were cousins of the founder of Adelaide.

He married Marian Wilson (c. 1828 – 31 March 1882) in September 1850. Their children included

- Agnes Marian Light (1851– ) married Cavendish Lister Nevile in 1875
- Alfred George Light (1853–1853)
- Ada Phillis Louisa Light (1854– ) married James William Wright in 1884
- Helen (or Ellen) Mary Light (1857–1858)
- Ernest Edward Light (1859–1920)
- Walter Charles Arnold (24 June 1861 – 19 October 1926) died in Mount Hawthorn, Western Australia.

They had a home, "Ashfield", on South Terrace, Adelaide. Their two youngest sons were prize-winning students of J. L. Young's Adelaide Educational Institution.

Light died in Guildford, Western Australia on 24 January 1896. His executor was his son, Ernest Edward Light M.I.C.E., who also lived in Guildford.
