= Carrington Street =

Street in Adelaide, South Australia

Carrington Street South Australia
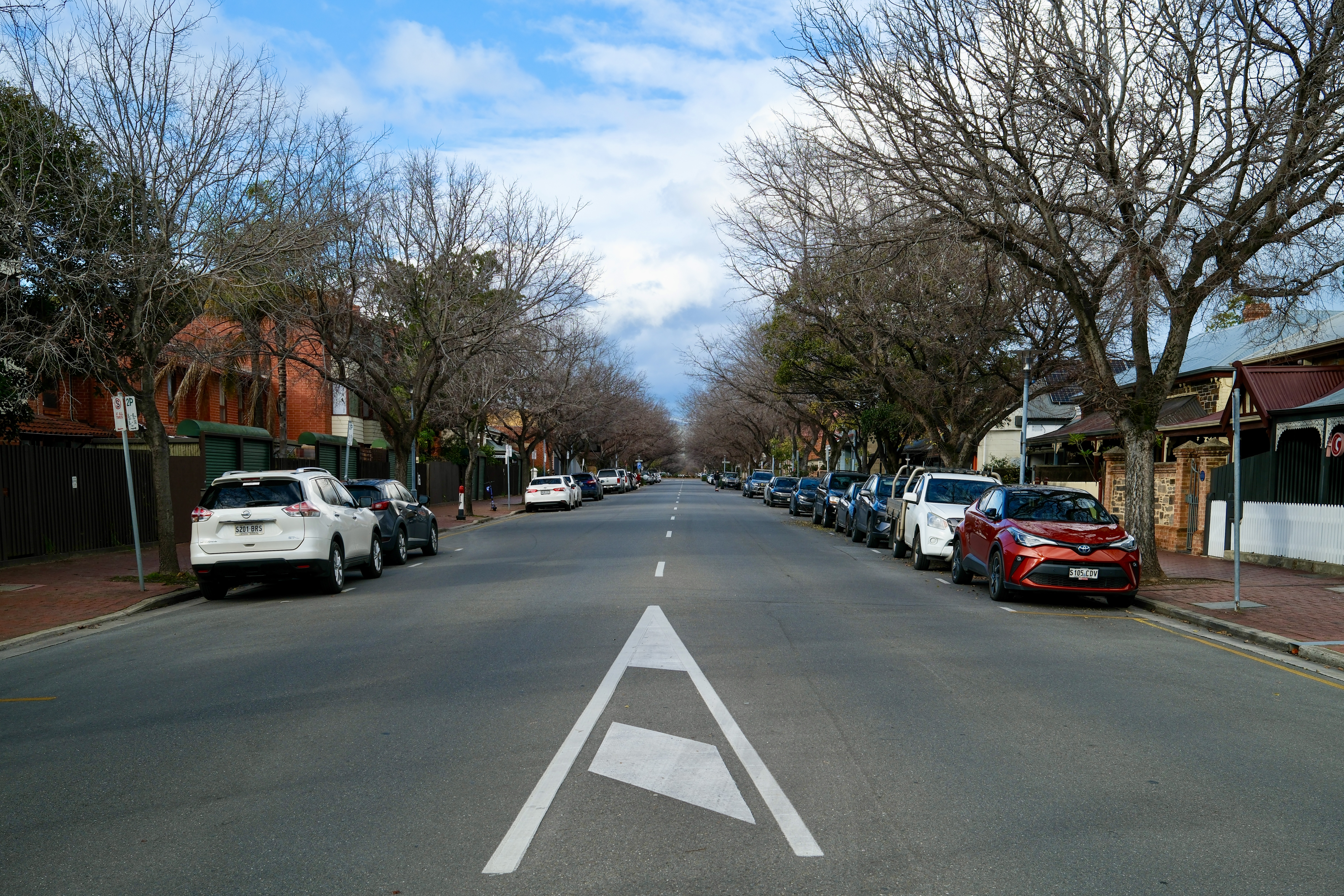

- Coordinates: 34.931521°S 138.600272°E (West end); 34.930688°S 138.616795°E (East end)

General information
- Type: Street
- Location: Adelaide city centre
- Length: 1.5 km (0.9 mi)
- Opened: 1837

Major junctions
- West end: King William Street; Adelaide
- Hurtle Square; Pulteney Street; Regent Street North; Hutt Street
- East end: East Terrace; Adelaide

Location(s)
- LGA(s): City of Adelaide

Carrington Street is a street in the south-eastern sector of the centre of Adelaide, South Australia. It runs east–west, from East Terrace to King William Street, blocked at Hutt Street and crossing Pulteney Street at Hurtle Square. It is one of the narrow streets of the Adelaide grid, at 1 chain (66 ft; 20 m) wide.

== History ==
Carrington Street was named by the Street Naming Committee on 23 May 1837 after John Abel Smith (Lord Carrington), a member of the National Colonisation Society of 1830.

A girls' school was founded and operated by Elizabeth Whitby from 1848. In 1851 the school was receiving government grants for 4 boys and 22 girls, and on the day of inspection she had 27 girls under instruction.

On 11 July 1852, a Swedenborgian church, also known as the New Church, opened on Carrington Street. Organist G. T. Light played at its first service. Jacob Pitman served as minister until 1859.

The Church of England's Orphan Home for Girls was established on Carrington Street in 1860 in a former German hospital, opening in October 1861. It was founded by Julia Farr, Mrs W. S. Douglas, Mrs Kent Hughes (Jane Hilditch), and one other. H. Kent Hughes (c.1814–1880), was treasurer for some years. The orphanage moved to Fullarton Road, Mitcham in August 1909, after the management of the home bought the residence of T. O'Halloran Giles (son of pastoralist Thomas Giles).

The King's Theatre was at 318 King William Street, designed by Williams & Good. It was located on the north-east corner of King William and Carrington Streets, with main entrances on both streets. It opened in February 1911. It closed in 1928, when it was remodelled into the King's Ballroom, with its entrance in Carrington Street. After closure in 1975 due to a serious fire, the building remained vacant for several years. It was transformed into legal offices in the 1980s.

== Junction list ==
Location	km	mi	Destinations	Notes
Adelaide city centre	0	0.0	King William Street	Continues as Wright Street
Adelaide city centre	0.55	0.34	Pulteney Street	On northern edge of Hurtle Square
Adelaide city centre	0.75	0.47	Regent Street North	North side only. Cyclists may continue to Regent Street South.
Adelaide city centre	1.1	0.68	Hutt Street	Median strip in Hutt Street prevents through traffic on Carrington Street
Adelaide city centre	1.5	0.93	East Terrace	
Adelaide city centre	1.000 mi = 1.609 km; 1.000 km = 0.621 mi: Incomplete access			
