= Henry Kent Hughes =

Australian politician

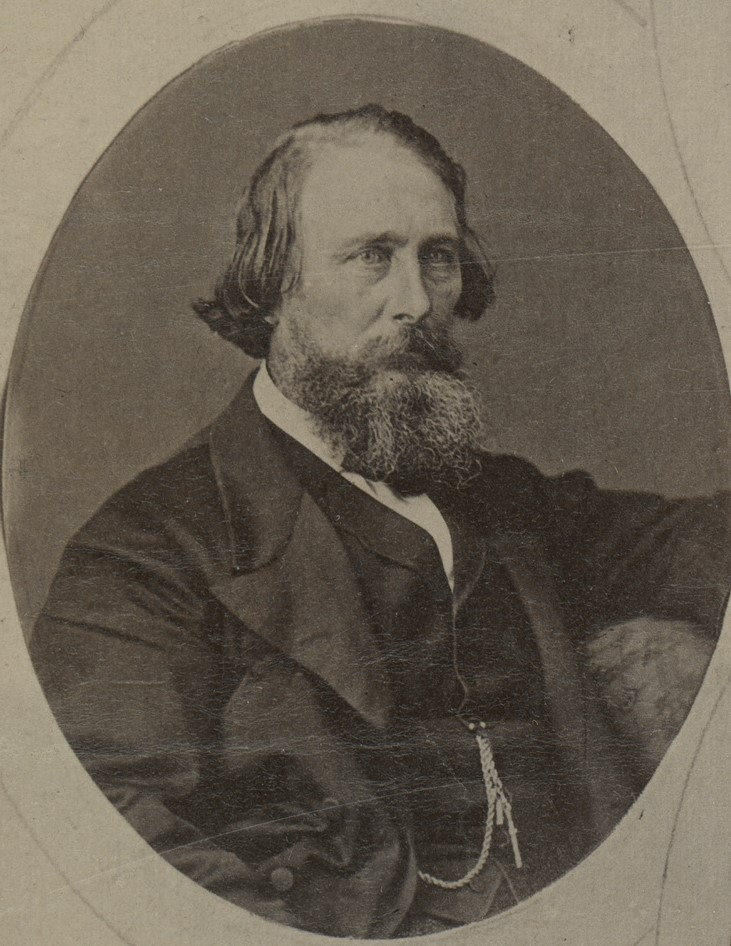

Member of the South Australian House of Assembly for Victoria
- In office 7 May 1868 – 1870

Member of the South Australian House of Assembly for Port Adelaide
- In office 5 April 1870 – 1875

Treasurer of South Australia
- In office 1868–1875

Member of the South Australian Legislative Council
- In office 1877–1878

Personal details
- Died: 30 August 1880

Henry Kent Hughes (c. 1814 – 30 August 1880), usually referred to as H. Kent Hughes, was a pastoralist and politician who sat in the South Australian House of Assembly from 1868 to 1875 representing the seats of Victoria and later, Port Adelaide.

== Early life ==
Hughes was born in England, possibly the son of Thomas Hughes, dyer, of Bunhill Row. He married Jane Hilditch (died 4 June 1890). They travelled to South Australia on the barque Raleigh, arriving at Port Adelaide on 15 January 1851.

Hughes was, for a considerable period (at least 1838 – 1844) in the colony of Victoria; he was one of a party, with Peter Snodgrass MLC, a Mr. Murdoch, a Dr. Dixon and one James Murdoch, who pioneered settlement in the Goulburn Valley in Victoria. With two brothers he founded the property, later the town, of Avenel, often cited as named for a Gloucestershire village with which had a connection (though information on its whereabouts is lacking), his previous property in England, or Sir Walter Scott's fictional castle and family, of which the White Lady of Avenel is the best known. There is also a reference to his property "Dropmore" which may or may not have been a separate holding.

Around 1854 he formed a business association with the future premier of South Australia, John Hart, in the company Hart & Hughes with offices in Waymouth Street, Adelaide. They built Port Adelaide's first flour mill, run by Hart and Company, of which he was a silent partner. In 1882 John Hart & Co. joined with Morgan, Connor & Glyde. (Note: William Morgan, C. H. T. Connor (1836–1926) and William Dening Glyde wheat and flour merchants with offices at 43 King William Street.) W. Duffield & Co., James Cowan & Co. and Harrold Brothers to form Adelaide Milling Co. or Adelaide Milling and Mercantile Company, with Connor as general manager until shortly before his death in 1926.

Hughes purchased extensive properties on the River Murray, including one near Wellington where he ran sheep in conjunction with his brother Edmund Chauntrell Hughes, S.M., which was quite successful, largely because of careful breeding and the attention they paid to prevention of diseases.

== Politics ==
In 1868 he put himself forward as M.P. for the Assembly District of Victoria, and was elected on 7 May with John Riddoch as a colleague. He remained in Parliament for three years, and went out at the dissolution in 1870, when he contested the seat of Port Adelaide and was elected with William Quin on 5 April 1870. He was Treasurer of South Australia in the 1868 Strangways ministry and the Ayers ministry of 1872. He left parliament at the dissolution of 1875, then was elected to the Legislative Council in 1877, but was forced in 1878 to resign on account of ill-health. He returned to England in an attempt to regain his health but died at Kew in 1880.

Among his bequests were £250 to the Orphan Home and £300 for St Peter's Cathedral, Adelaide. His wife donated the tower clock on Saint Andrew's Church, Walkerville in his memory.

== Other interests ==
He appears to have been a worshipper at Melbourne's St. Peter's Cathedral, briefly, around 1848.

He had a share in Section 2112, Port Adelaide which was subdivided by Private Act in 1852.

He was a director of the National Bank

His chief public service was to act as Secretary and Treasurer for the Church of England's Orphan Home for Girls on Carrington Street. His wife, Jane, who survived him, was, with Julia Farr, one of the Home's founders.

His home in Adelaide was "Avenel", a ten-roomed residence on Robe Terrace, North Adelaide. Its 20 acres, "Avenel Gardens", was subsequently owned by William Pope, founder of North Adelaide Golf Club, then subdivided in the 1890s.
