= Unley Road =

Road in Unley, South Australia

Unley Road South Australia
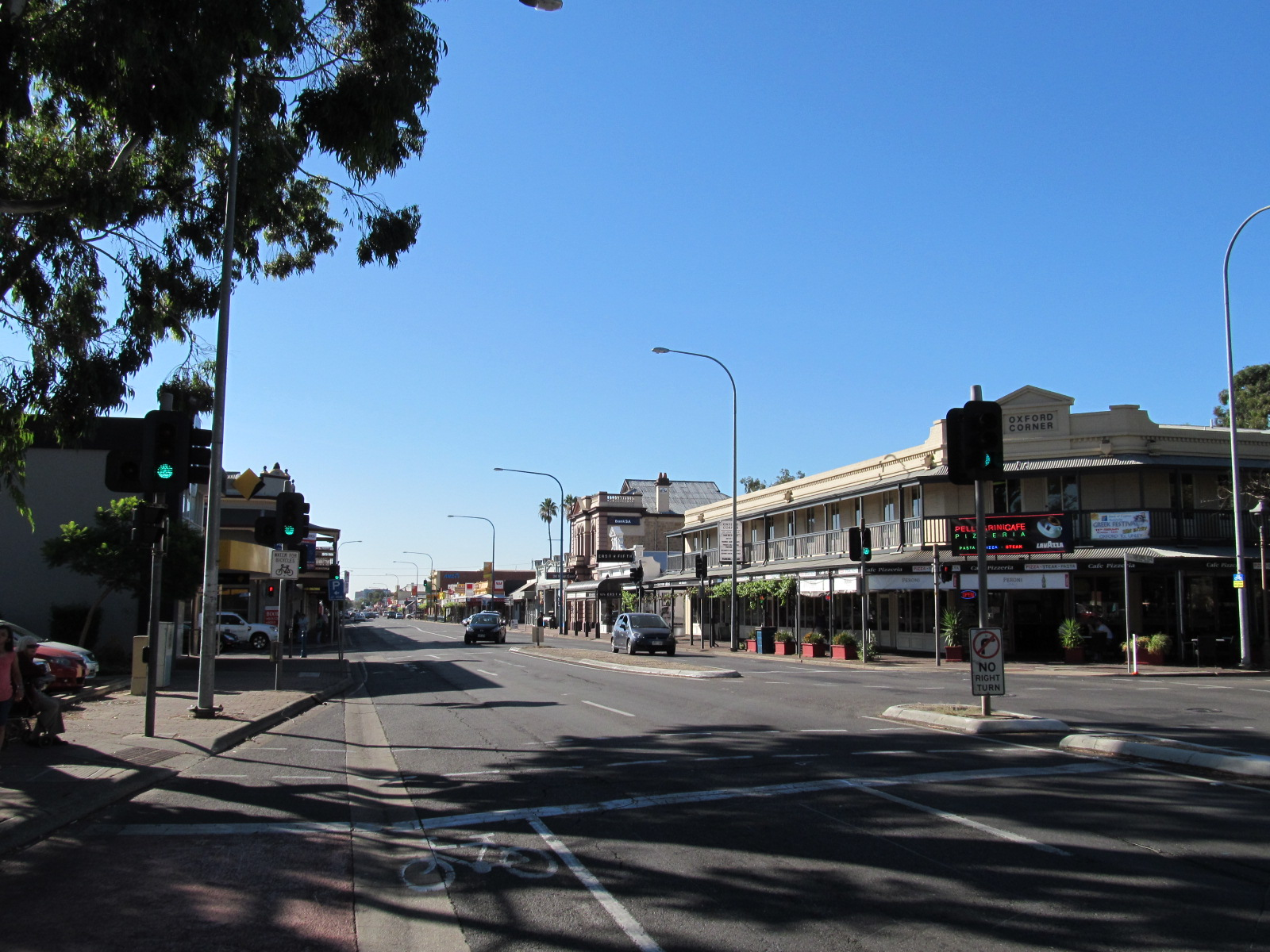
- Corner of Unley Road and Arthur Street, 2012
- Coordinates: 34.935362°S 138.606514°E (North end); 34.965470°S 138.608613°E (South end)

General information
- Type: Road
- Location: Adelaide
- Length: 3.4 km (2.1 mi)
- Route number(s): B29 (2020–present) (Unley–Unley Park)

Major junctions
- North end: Pulteney Street; Adelaide
- South Terrace; Greenhill Road; Cross Road
- South end: Belair Road; Kingswood, Adelaide

Location(s)
- Region: Eastern Adelaide

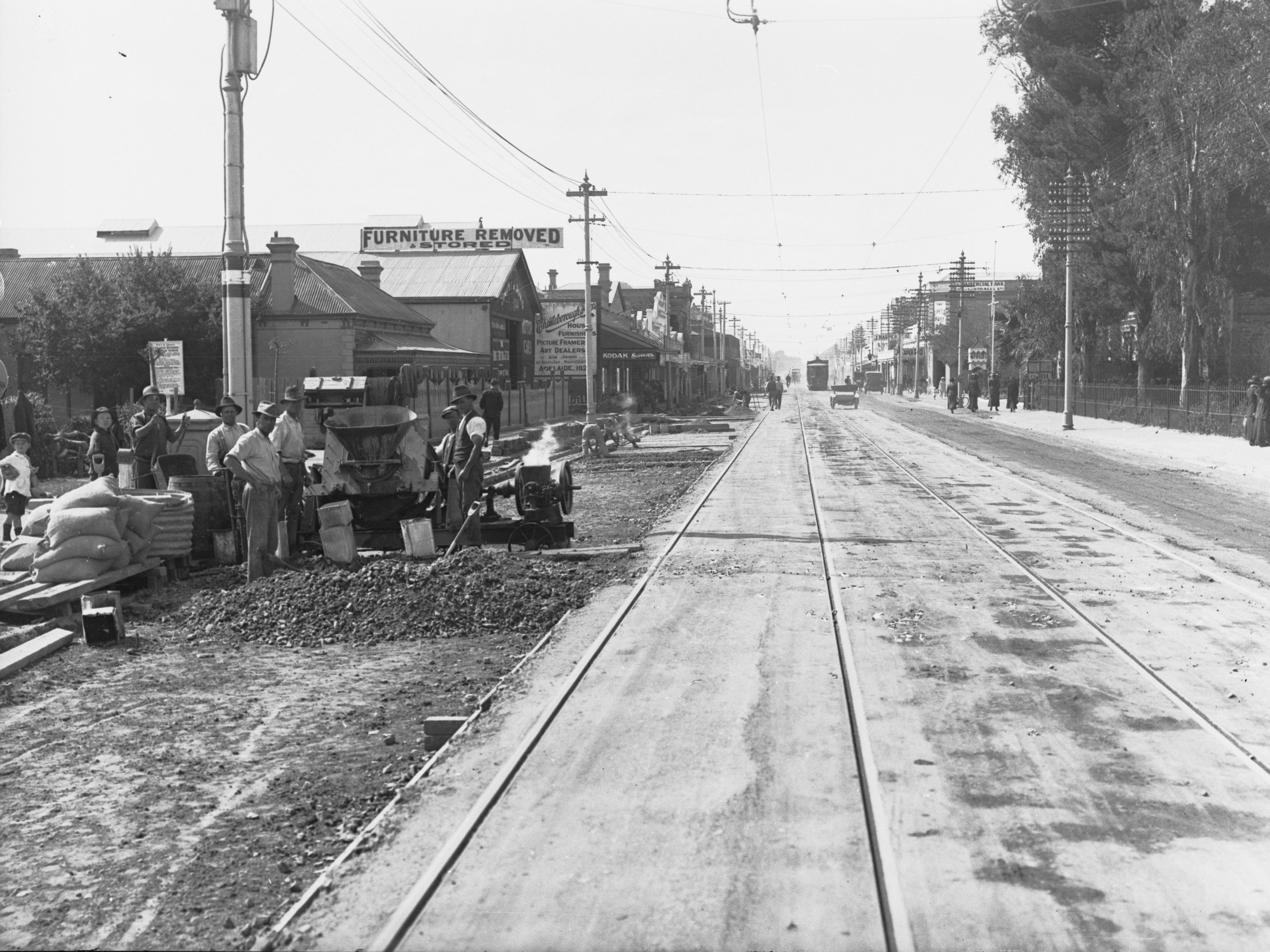
Unley Road from outside St Augustine's Church in 1921

Unley Road is a road in the City of Unley, located south of the City of Adelaide, the capital of South Australia. It runs from South Terrace to Cross Road, where it becomes Belair Road. The road was named after the family name of the wife of Thomas Whistler, owner of land in Unley which was laid out around 1857.

The road contains numerous cafés, restaurants, shops and churches. It is known for its boutique shopping scene selling designer fashion and artisan gifts and homewares. The road is two-lane with parking on both sides plus bicycle lanes. A tramline ran through the road up until the 1960s.

== Major intersections ==
LGA	Location	km	mi	Destinations	Notes
Adelaide	Adelaide	0.0	0.0	Pulteney Street – Adelaide CBD	Northern terminus of road
Adelaide	Adelaide	0.0	0.0	South Terrace – Adelaide CBD	
Adelaide–Unley boundary	Adelaide–Unley–Parkside boundary	0.6	0.37	Greenhill Road (R1) – Wayville, Burnside	Northern terminus of route B29
Unley–Mitcham boundary	Unley Park–Malvern–Hawthorn–Kingswood quadripoint	3.3	2.1	Cross Road (A3) – Plympton, Glen Osmond	
Unley–Mitcham boundary	Unley Park–Malvern–Hawthorn–Kingswood quadripoint	3.3	2.1	Belair Road (B29) – Torrens Park, Belair	Route B29 continues south along Belair Road
Route transition
