= Halifax Street =

Street in Adelaide, South Australia

Halifax Street South Australia
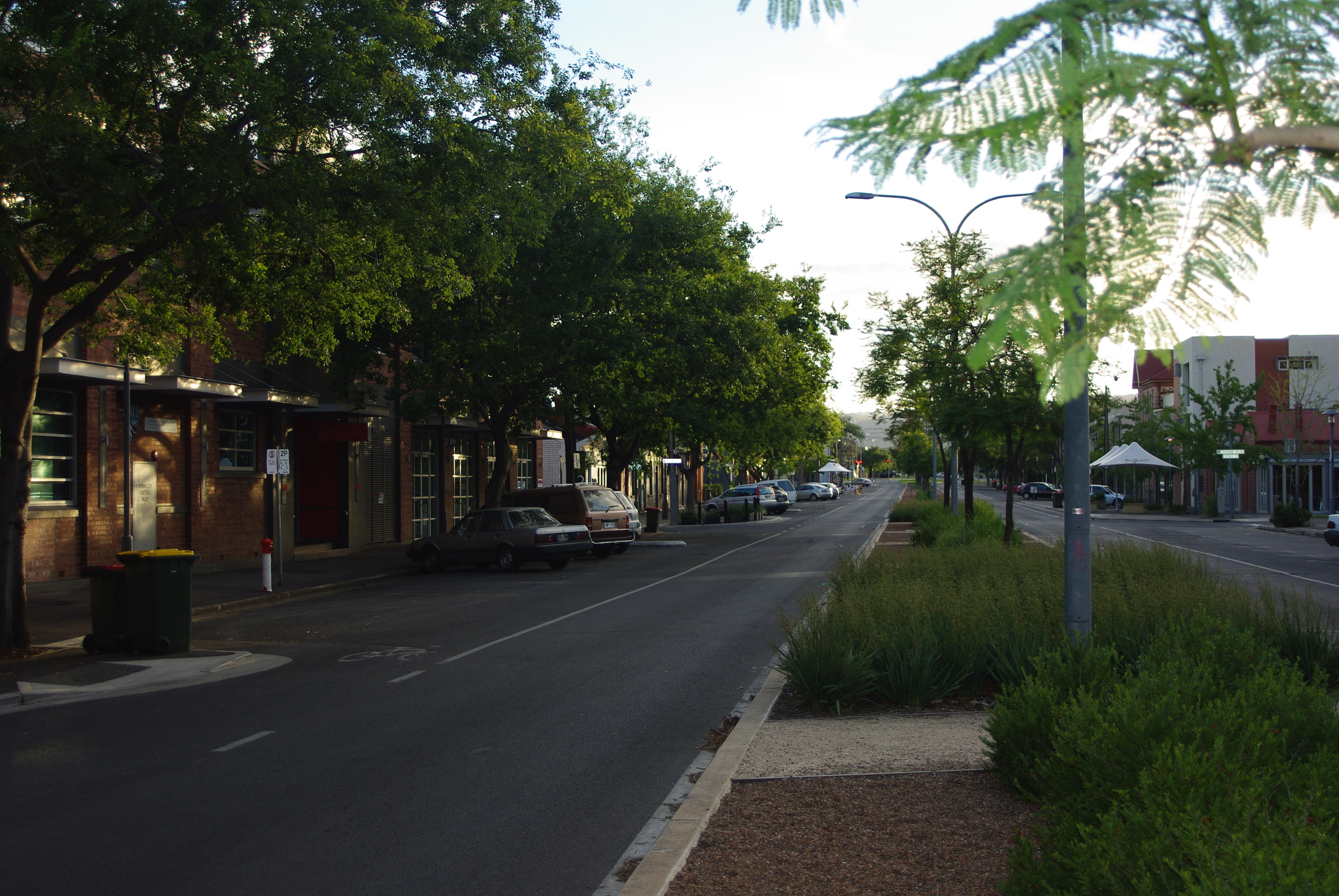
- View of Halifax Street facing east between King William and Pulteney Street Streets
- Coordinates: 34.932913°S 138.600301°E (West end); 34.932076°S 138.616902°E (East end)

General information
- Type: Street
- Location: Adelaide city centre
- Length: 1.5 km (0.9 mi)
- Opened: 1837

Major junctions
- West end: King William Street; Adelaide
- Hurtle Square; Pulteney Street; Hutt Street
- East end: East Terrace; Adelaide

Location(s)
- LGA(s): City of Adelaide

Halifax Street is a street in the south-eastern sector of the centre of Adelaide, South Australia. It runs east–west between East Terrace and King William Street, crossing Hutt Street and Pulteney Street and passing through Hurtle Square. It was named after Sir Charles Wood (later Charles Wood, 1st Viscount Halifax), British Member of Parliament for Halifax.

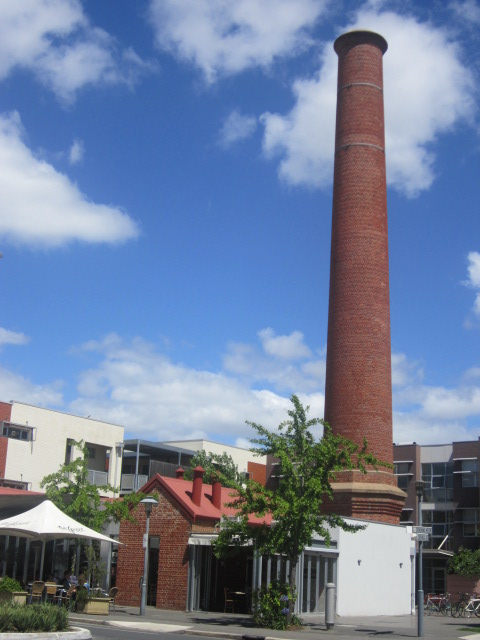
A local landmark, this 35-metre chimney on Halifax Street was built in 1909 and is what remains of a refuse incinerator that consumed the bulk of the city's rubbish until its closure in the early 1950s, its function being replaced by landfill.

Halifax Street is one of the intermediate-width streets of the Adelaide grid, at 1 1/2 chains (99 ft; 30 m) wide.

Circa 1844 Halifax Street became the location of one of Adelaide's first breweries, founded by William Henry Clark who later built a flour mill close by. The brewery and mill were sited on city acres 564 and 603 between Halifax and Gilles streets which, from 1909 to 1950, housed Adelaide's rubbish incinerator.

== Junction list ==
Location	km	mi	Destinations	Notes
Adelaide city centre	0	0.0	King William Street	Continues as Sturt Street
Adelaide city centre	0.55	0.34	Pulteney Street	In Hurtle Square
Adelaide city centre	1.1	0.68	Hutt Street	
Adelaide city centre	1.5	0.93	East Terrace	
1.000 mi = 1.609 km; 1.000 km = 0.621 mi
