= Pirie Street =

Street in Adelaide, South Australia

Pirie Street South Australia
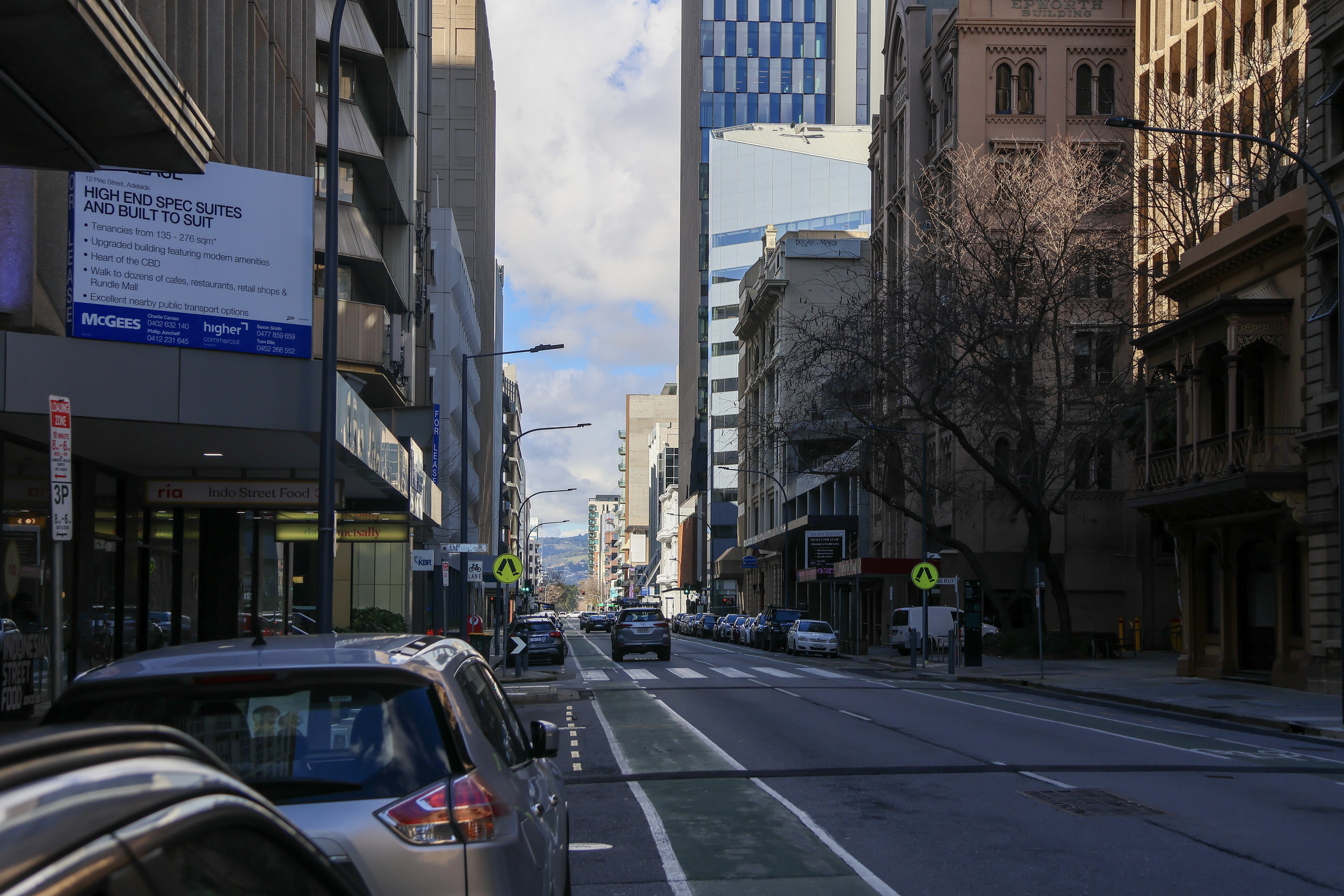
- Pirie Street looking east, 2026
- Coordinates: 34.925777°S 138.599776°E (West end); 34.925126°S 138.611827°E (East end)

General information
- Type: Street
- Location: Adelaide city centre
- Length: 1.1 km (0.7 mi)
- Opened: 1837

Major junctions
- West end: King William Street; Adelaide
- Hindmarsh Square; Pulteney Street; Frome Street; Hutt Street
- East end: East Terrace; Adelaide

Location(s)
- LGA(s): City of Adelaide

Pirie Street is a road on the east side of the Adelaide central business district, South Australia. It runs east–west, between East Terrace and King William Street. After crossing King William Street, it continues as Waymouth Street. It forms the southern boundary of Hindmarsh Square which is in the centre of the north-east quadrant of the city centre.

Pirie Street is served by a stop on the Glenelg tram line on King William Street. It is mainly occupied by office buildings, restaurants, and nightspots. It is one of the narrower streets of the Adelaide grid, at 1 chain (66 ft; 20 m) wide, and has a bicycle lane.

It has a number of notable buildings, including several heritage-listed ones, and was once home to the biggest brewery in the colony of South Australia, the Adelaide Brewery. In 2019 it was used as a location for the film Escape from Pretoria, starring Daniel Radcliffe, substituting for Cape Town, South Africa.

== History and notable buildings ==
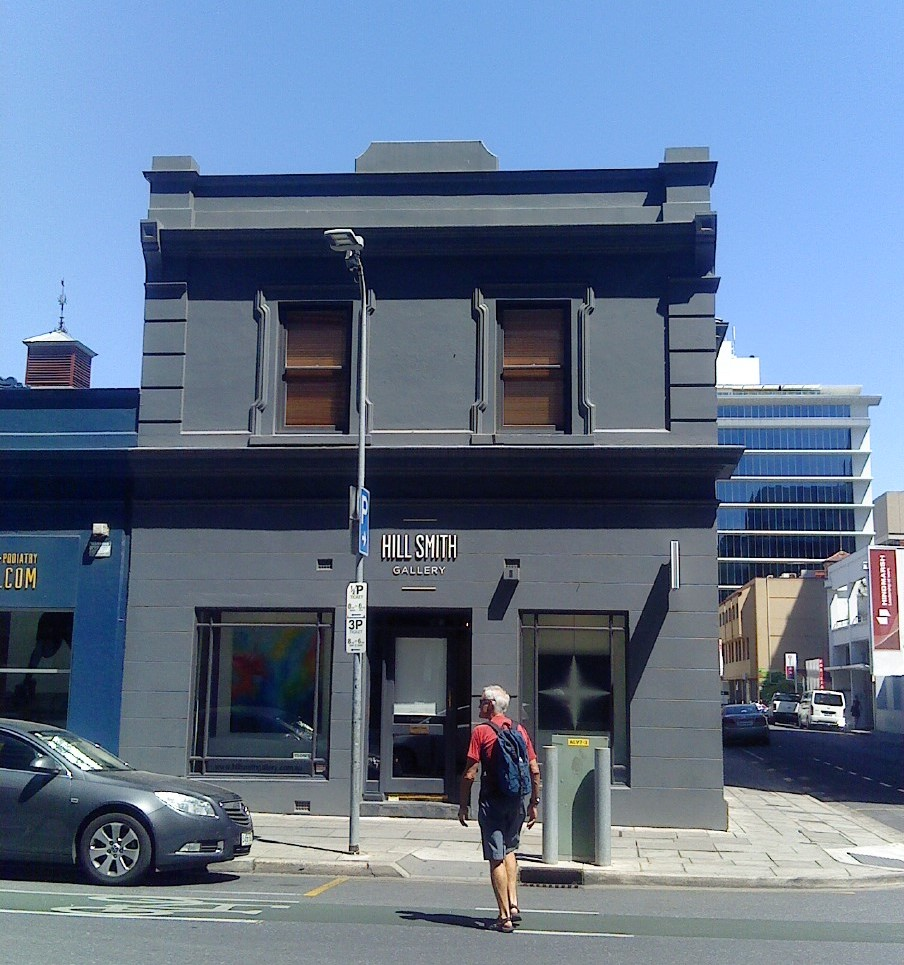
Former Hill Smith Gallery, cnr Pirie and Wyatt streets

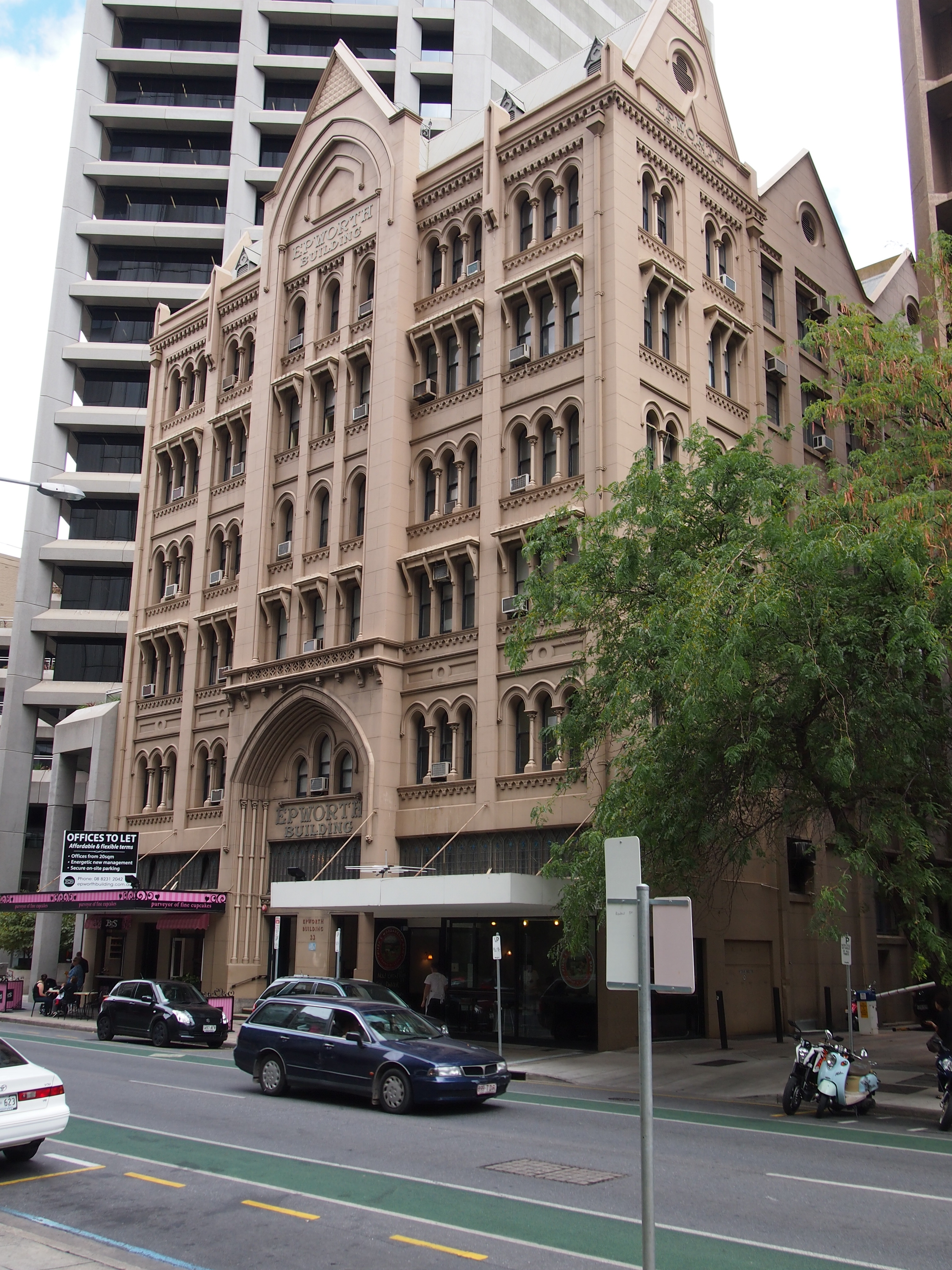
The Epworth Building on the south side of Pirie Street, between King William Street and Gawler Place

Pirie Street was named after Sir John Pirie, Lord Mayor of London and a founding director of the South Australian Company.

The Pirie Street Methodist Church was located on the site that is now the Adelaide Town Hall office building, with the 1862 Methodist Meeting Hall (see below) behind.

The Adelaide City Council headquarters are on Pirie Street.

The Pirie Street Brewery, later known as Adelaide Brewery, occupied a number of buildings down Wyatt Street, as well as no. 113 Pirie, which was occupied by the Hill Smith Gallery from July 1983 for 37 years. While no. 113 has not been heritage-listed, the other brewery buildings in Wyatt street were listed on the South Australian Heritage Register on 20 November 1986.

Buildings which are heritage-listed at state level as of April 2024 are:

- the Queen's Chambers at no. 19
- the Old Methodist Meeting Hall at no. 25
- Darlington House offices, formerly the Salvation Army's People's Palace, where Archie Roach met Ruby Hunter), and before that the original German Club building (1879)
- the old Tivoli Hotel at no.248 (state and local listing)

Other buildings which are heritage-listed as of local heritage interest as of April 2024 are:

- The Epworth Building at 31–35 Pirie Street was built in 1926 as a commercial property for the Methodist Church. Designed by the architectural practice of English and Soward, it is listed among 120 nationally significant 20th-century buildings in South Australia.
- A c.1920s façade of the former Bank of South Australia at no. 51; however, in August 2020, developers were given permission to demolish the whole building ahead of the construction of a new Hyatt Regency Adelaide Hotel

== Film location ==
In March 2019 a section of Pirie Street was closed for the day and transformed to represent Cape Town in the 1970s, for filming of the thriller film Escape from Pretoria, starring Daniel Radcliffe.

== Junction list ==
Location	km	mi	Destinations	Notes
Adelaide city centre	0	0.0	King William Street	Continues as Waymouth Street
Adelaide city centre	0.2	0.12	Gawler Place	
Adelaide city centre	0.55	0.34	Pulteney Street	At southern edge of Hindmarsh Square
Adelaide city centre	0.75	0.47	Frome Street	
Adelaide city centre	1.1	0.68	Hutt Street (to south), East Terrace (to north and east)	Continues as East Terrace for 100 m, then Bartels Road
1.000 mi = 1.609 km; 1.000 km = 0.621 mi

== Transportation ==
Pirie Street is also the location of a stop on the Glenelg tram line.

Preceding station	Adelaide Metro	Following station
Rundle Mall towards City West	Glenelg tram line	Victoria Square towards Moseley Square
