= Hurtle Square =

Public squares in Adelaide, Australia

- Tangkaira
- Hurtle Square, looking east in 2026

- Location within City of Adelaide
- Namesake: James Hurtle Fisher
- Maintained by: City of Adelaide
- Location: Adelaide, South Australia, Australia
- Postal code: 5000
- Coordinates: 34.9322°S 138.6063°E
- North: Pulteney Street
- East: Carrington Street; Halifax Street
- South: Pulteney Street
- West: Carrington Street; Halifax Street

Construction
- Completed: 1837

Other
- Designer: William Light

Hurtle Square, also known as Tangkaira, is one of five public squares in the Adelaide city centre, South Australia. Located in the centre of the south-eastern quarter of the city, it surrounds the intersection of Halifax and Pulteney streets. Its north edge is bounded by Carrington Street.

It is one of six squares designed by the founder of Adelaide, Colonel William Light, who was Surveyor-General at the time, in his 1837 plan of the City of Adelaide which spanned the River Torrens Valley, comprising the city centre (South Adelaide) and North Adelaide. The square was named in 1837 by the Street Naming Committee after James Hurtle Fisher, South Australia's first Resident Commissioner. In 2003, as part of the dual naming initiative by the Adelaide City Council, a second name, Tangkaira, was assigned in the Kaurna language of the original inhabitants.

== History ==
The street naming committee named the square after James Hurtle Fisher, South Australia's first Resident Commissioner, on 23 May 1837.

In March 2003, as part of the City of Adelaide's dual naming project, in association with the University of Adelaide's Kaurna Dictionary Project, the square was assigned the name "Tangkaira", a word which means "fungus", after a prominent Kaurna person. Tangkaira (also known as Charlotte), who came from the Clare district, was the wife of Ityamai-itpina (aka "King Rodney"), a key negotiator with the new colonists. She provided what would become an important resource for reviving the Kaurna language in recent times, by writing one of the earliest examples of the written Kaurna language: a letter by school children to Governor Gawler in 1841, pleading that he continue working as Governor.

== Description ==
Located in the centre of the south-eastern quarter of the city, the Square surrounds the intersection of Halifax and Pulteney Streets, with its northern edge is bounded by Carrington Street. The surrounding area is mostly residential.
