= Gilles Street =

Street in Adelaide, South Australia

Gilles Street South Australia
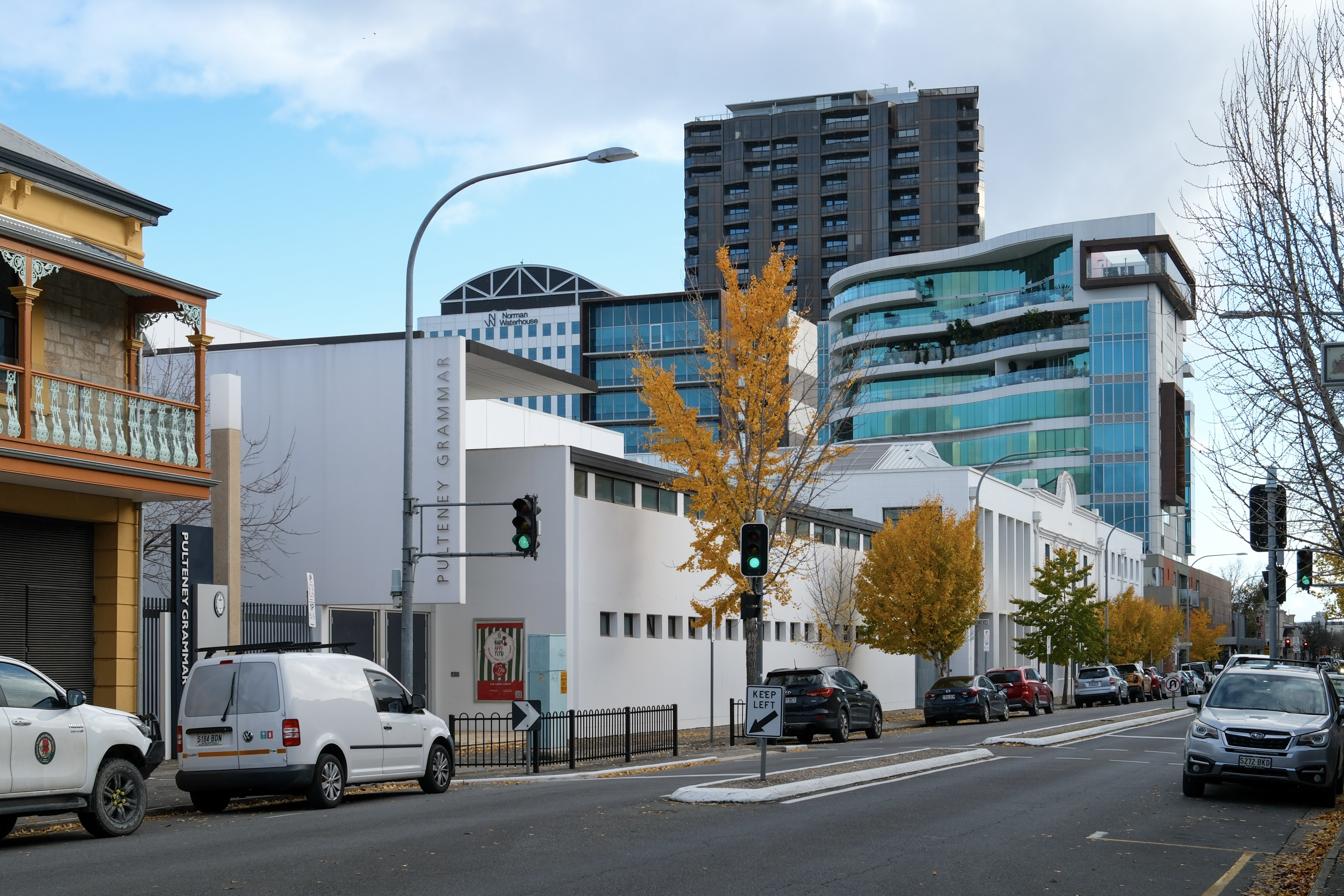
- Gilles Street looking west
- Coordinates: 34.934284°S 138.600444°E (West end); 34.933422°S 138.617728°E (East end)

General information
- Type: Street
- Location: Adelaide city centre
- Length: 1.6 km (1.0 mi)
- Opened: 1837

Major junctions
- West end: King William Street; Adelaide
- Pulteney Street; Hutt Street
- East end: East Terrace; Adelaide

Location(s)
- LGA(s): City of Adelaide

Gilles Street is a thoroughfare in the south-eastern sector of the centre of Adelaide, South Australia. It runs east–west between East Terrace and King William Street, crossing Hutt Street and Pulteney Street. Gilles Street Primary School and Pulteney Grammar School front the street.

== History ==
Gilles Street was named after Osmond Gilles, an early treasurer of the colony of South Australia, on 23 May 1837.

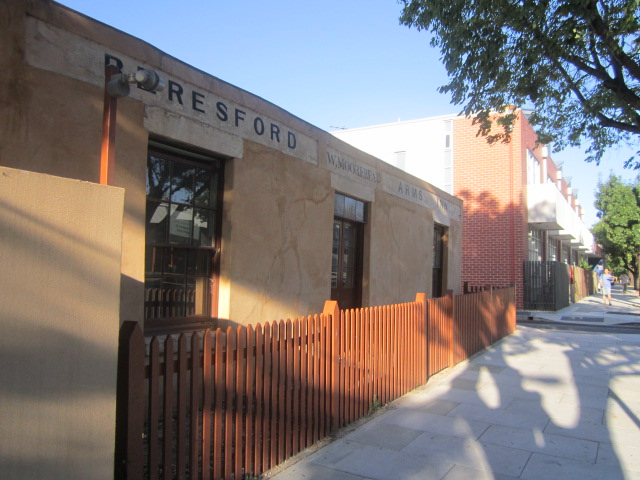
This heritage-listed building in Gilles Street traded variously as the Beresford Arms and later Oddfellows Arms from 1840 until 1861, and was sold to a German printer in 1873. The early landowner, following subdivision of the original acre plot, was John Martin, known also for his founding connection with John Martin's

In 2008, the Gilles Street Markets opened, located at Gilles Street Primary School. The founder of the market was Jennifer Centenera. The "sometimes weekly, sometimes fortnightly" market soon gained a reputation as "Adelaide's premier destination for all things fashion (from local designers to vintage classics)". After 10 years of trading in Gilles Street, the market moved to the Adelaide Showground in Wayville, rebranding itself as Gilles at the Grounds. As of 2025, the market opened on Sundays from 9am to 3pm, and Saturday Night Markets from 3pm to 9pm.

== Junction list ==
Location	km	mi	Destinations	Notes
Adelaide city centre	0	0.0	King William Street	Continues as Gilbert Street
Adelaide city centre	0.55	0.34	Pulteney Street	
Adelaide city centre	1.1	0.68	Hutt Street	
Adelaide city centre	1.6	0.99	East Terrace	
1.000 mi = 1.609 km; 1.000 km = 0.621 mi

== Notable features ==
Gilles Street is one of the narrower streets of the Adelaide grid, at 1 chain (66 ft; 20 m) wide.

Two school properties adjoin in Gilles Street:

- Gilles Street Primary School, at 101-119 Gilles Street, which was built in 1899 to designs by Charles Edward Owen Smyth and heritage-listed on the South Australian Heritage Register in 1986
- Pulteney Grammar School

== See also ==
- Gilles Street Primary School
