= Waymouth =

Waymouth is a surname. Notable people with the surname include:

- Edward Waymouth Reid (1862–1948), British physiologist
- Henry Waymouth (1791–1848), one of the British founding directors of the South Australian Company in 1835
- Louis Waymouth (born 1978), British writer and actor
- Nigel Waymouth (born 1941), American designer and artist
- Robert Waymouth (born 1960), American chemist
