= Pulteney Street =

Street in Adelaide, South Australia

Pulteney Street South Australia
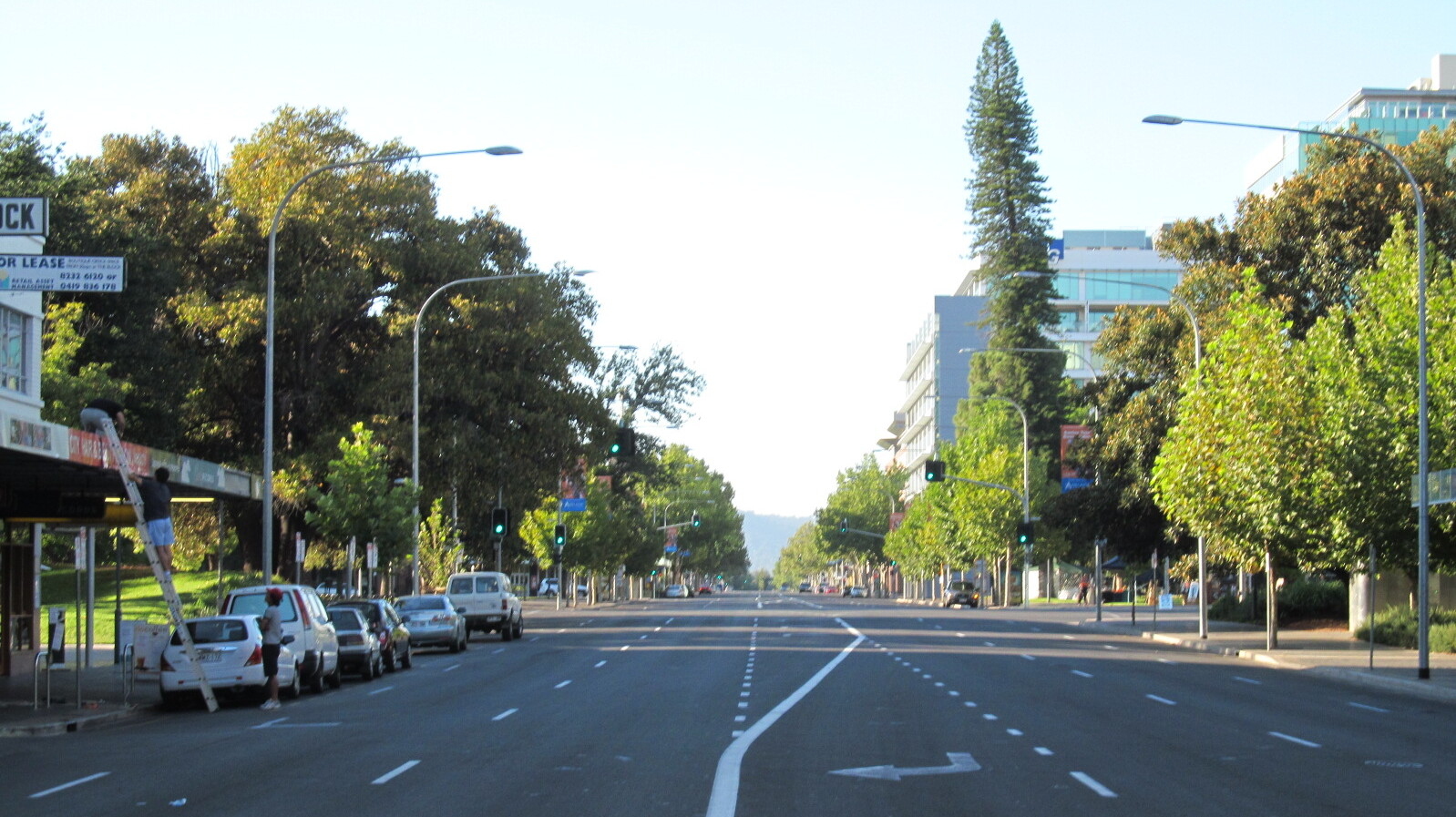
- Pulteney Street, looking south from near North Terrace
- Coordinates: 34.921252°S 138.605454°E (North end); 34.935361°S 138.606515°E (South end)

General information
- Type: Street
- Location: Adelaide city centre
- Length: 1.6 km (1.0 mi)
- Opened: 1837

Major junctions
- North end: North Terrace; Adelaide
- Hindmarsh Square; Grenfell Street; Wakefield Street; Hurtle Square; Halifax Street; South Terrace
- South end: Unley Road; Adelaide

Location(s)
- LGA(s): City of Adelaide

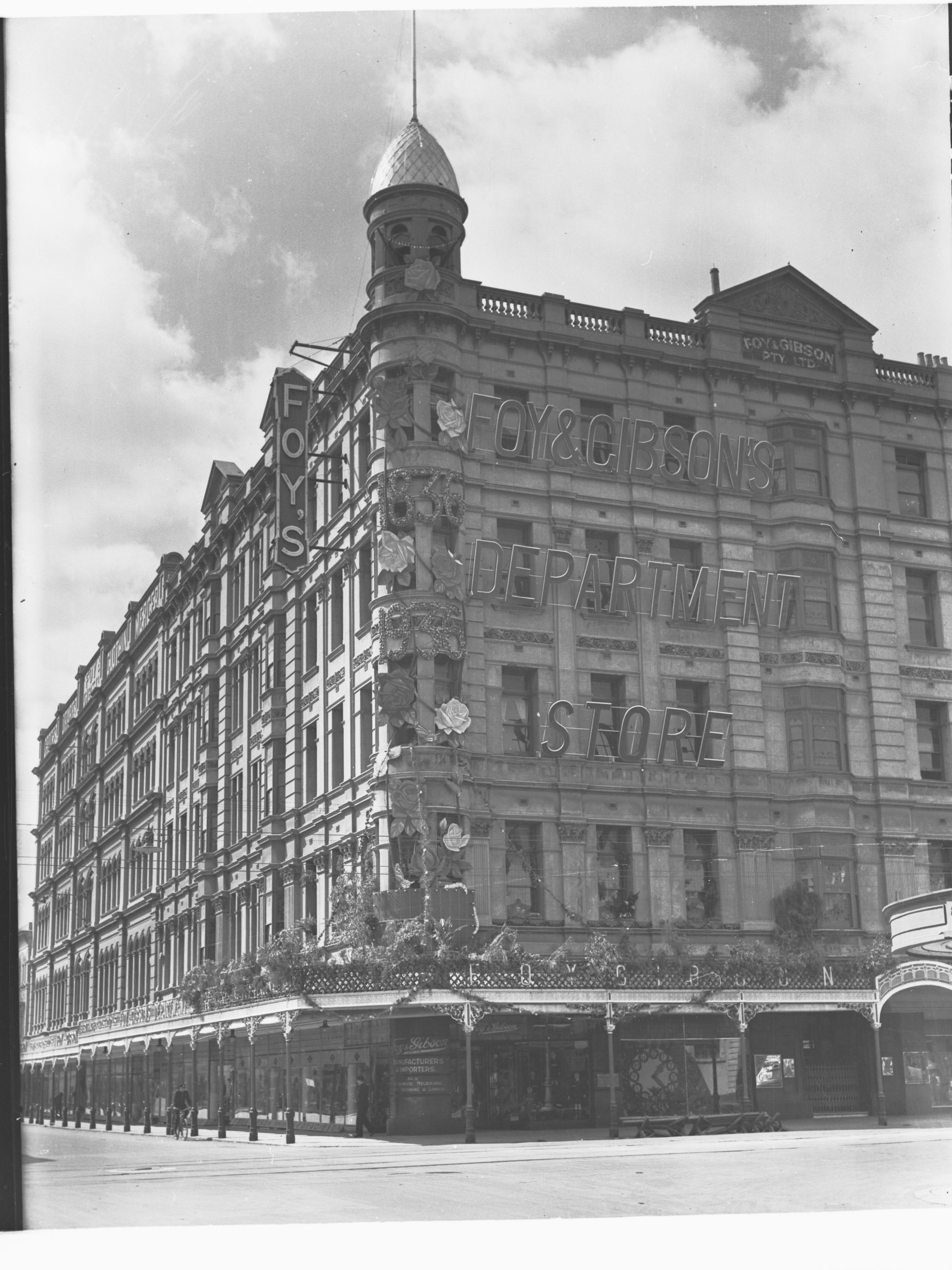
Foy and Gibson's department store (formerly the Grand Central Hotel), decorated for the centenary of Adelaide in 1936

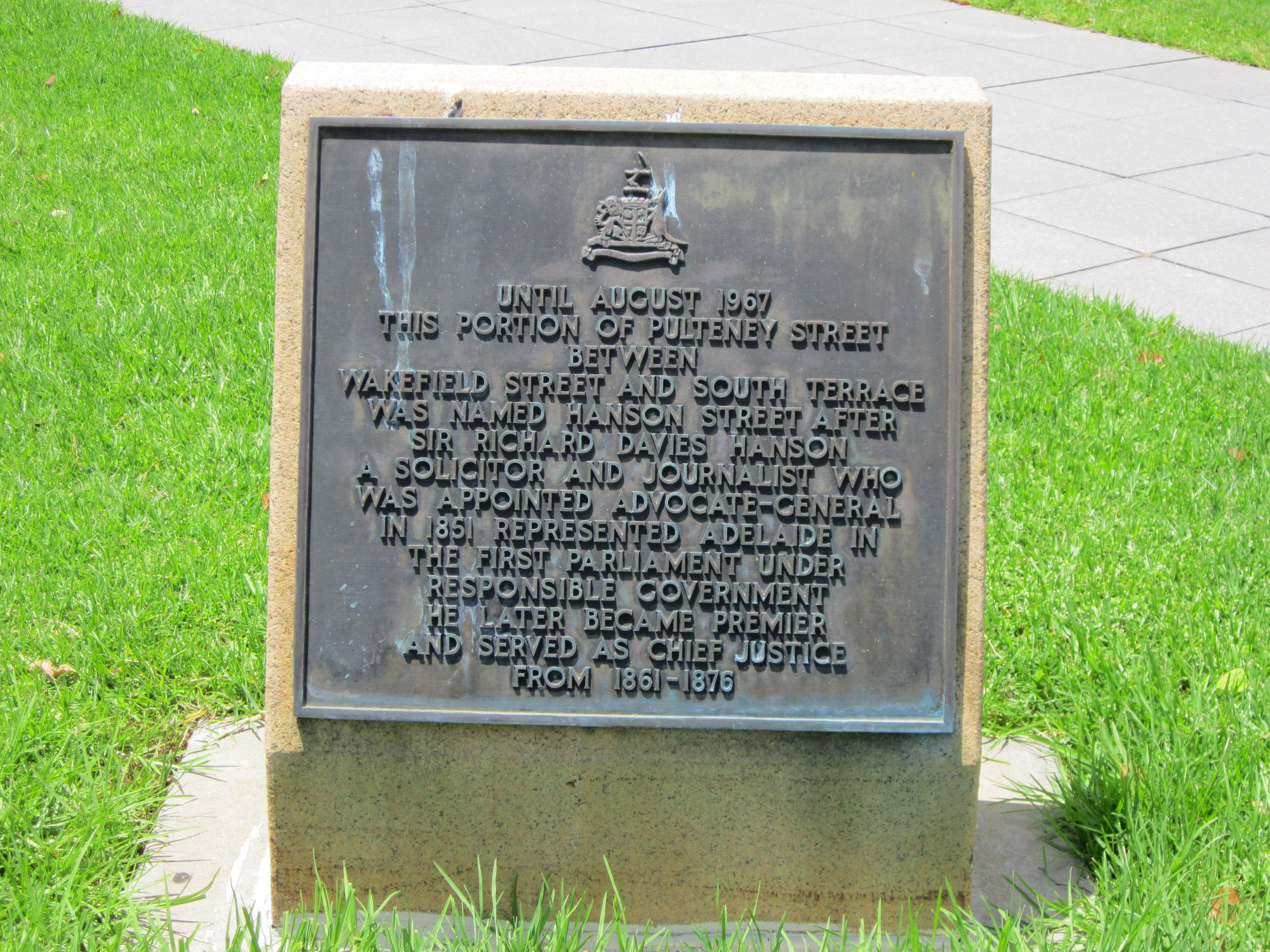
The plaque commemorating the former Hanson Street

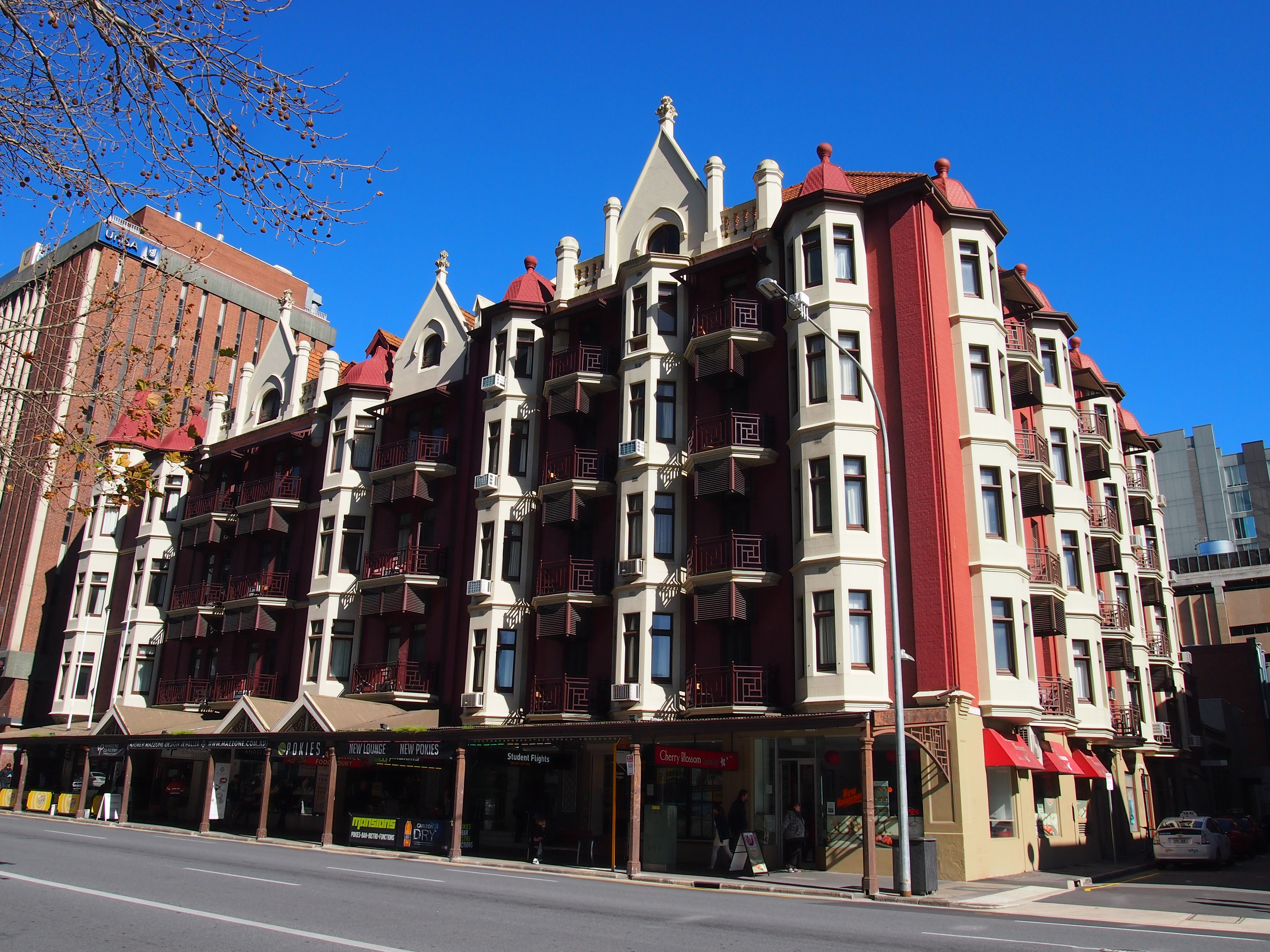
Ruthven Mansions

Pulteney Street is a main road which runs north-south through the middle of the eastern half of the Adelaide city centre, in Adelaide, South Australia. It runs north-south from North Terrace, through Hindmarsh and Hurtle Squares, to South Terrace, where it becomes Unley Road. It is the only one of the city centre's major north-south thoroughfares that does not continue northwards over North Terrace.

== History ==
Pulteney Street was named after Admiral Sir Pulteney Malcolm on 23 May 1837, at the behest of Governor Hindmarsh.

On the south-east corner of Pulteney and Rundle streets was the elegant York Hotel, built by entrepreneur and publican C. A. Hornabrook in 1849. This was replaced in 1911 by the palatial Grand Central Hotel, owned by Foy & Gibson. By 1924 the hotel had gone bankrupt, and was converted into Foy & Gibson's department store. After Foy & Gibson moved into Rundle Street as Cox Foys in the mid-1950s, the building was used as government offices, and eventually demolished to make way for a multi-storey car park in 1975–76.

The southern portion of Pulteney Street, between Wakefield Street and South Terrace, was originally named Hanson Street, after Richard Hanson (later Sir Richard), a London solicitor and journalist, and founding member of the South Australian Literary Society in August 1834. In 1846, nearly a decade after the naming, Hanson moved to South Australia, where he served as Premier (1857-1860), Chief Justice of the Supreme Court (from 1861) and as acting Governor (1872-1873). Hanson Street was subsumed into the expanded Pulteney Street in August 1967. The Hanson Street Memorial in Hurtle Square maintains the commemoration of Sir Richard.

Pulteney Street is the only one of the city centre's major north-south thoroughfares that does not continue north from North Terrace. This is due to Sir John Langdon Bonython donating over £50,000 to the University of Adelaide for it to build its Great Hall, (named Bonython Hall). One of the conditions of Bonython's bequest was that the hall be built on North Terrace opposite Pulteney Street, thus ensuring that the thoroughfare could not continue north through the parklands and divide the already small campus.

== Location ==
Pulteney Street runs north-south through the middle of the eastern half of the Adelaide city centre, from North Terrace, through Hindmarsh and Hurtle Squares, to South Terrace, where it becomes Unley Road, and subsequently, (at Cross Road), becomes Belair Road.

== Significant buildings ==
=== "The Mansions" ===
Ruthven Mansions, at 15−17 Pulteney Street (and occupying 1−7 Austin Street), is a large residential building, with commercial premises on the ground floor. It was built in two stages, in 1911–12 and 1915, for London investor Ruthven Frederic Ruthven-Smith, with the first stage designed by local architects Black and Fuller and built by A. R. Maddern and Son. Built as luxury apartments, it included automated vacuum cleaning, automated doors, mechanical ventilation, electric light and an electric lift. Stage one comprised 12 apartments, with an additional five storeys, comprising 28 apartments, added by builders W. C. Torode in 1915. The building is considered a good example of residential Gothic Revivalist and Art Nouveau architecture. Prominent inhabitants included members of the Kyffin Thomas family, proprietors of the South Australian Register, and William Alfred Webb, Commissioner of the South Australian Railways from 1922 to 1930.

Shortly after the second stage was completed in 1915, geologist and Polar explorer Sir Douglas Mawson, and his wife, community worker and writer Paquita Mawson, moved into Ruthven Mansions with their new daughter, Patricia Mawson, who later became a noted parasitologist. This was their first home together, but within a year Douglas was called to do war service in England, and Paquita and Patricia moved to Melbourne to be with her family in his absence. (They moved to a new home in Brighton after the war.)

The building was sold to the South Australian Government in 1954 and became neglected. By 1976, the building's balconettes had been removed, the interior was deemed unsafe, and the former occupants of the ground floor, the Chest Clinic, had moved out. One long-term and much-loved occupant through the middle of the 20th century was Adelaide bookseller Harry Muir's Beck Book Company (also known as Beck's Bookshop), which later became Wakefield Press.

After some time, the building was extensively renovated, including partial rebuilding of the exterior. The building was heritage-listed by the South Australian Heritage Register on 11 September 1986, recognised as an historically and architecturally important building. As of 2022 the building, known as "Mansions on Pulteney", is owned by La Loft, which lets the residences (all studio or one-bedroom size) as serviced apartments. The Mansions Tavern is in the Mansions Arcade, which has its entrance on Pulteney Street and runs through the middle of the building.

=== Astor Hotel ===
The Astor Hotel ("The Astor") is located on the north west corner of Gilles and Pulteney Streets. The first hotel on the site was the Labour in Vain in 1858, which was renamed Perseverance in 1862. In 1952 the Hanson Hotel was established, and after refurbishment became the Astor Hotel in 1991.

== See also ==
- Pulteney Grammar School
