= Parks and gardens of Adelaide =

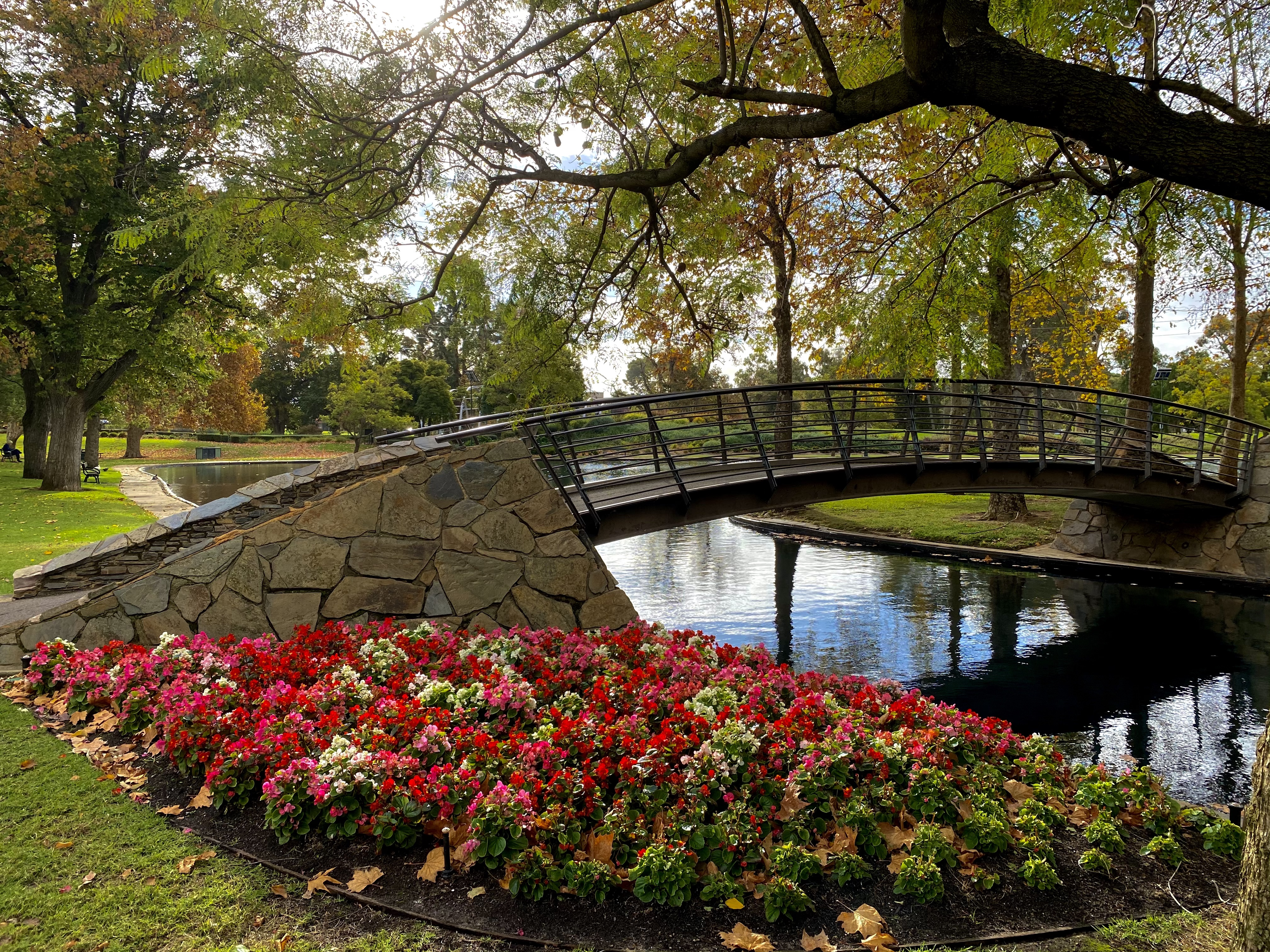
Rymill Park in autumn

List of Adelaide parks and gardens refers to parks and gardens within the metropolitan area in South Australia known as Adelaide.

== Northern Adelaide ==
The South Australian government region known as Northern Adelaide and which occupies the northern end of the Adelaide metropolitan area consists of the following local government areas: the City of Playford, the City of Salisbury, the City of Tea Tree Gully and the east half of the City of Port Adelaide Enfield.

=== Playford ===
- Dauntsey Reserve BMX Skate – Woodford Road, Elizabeth
- Fremont Park – Yorktown Road, Elizabeth
- Kalara Reserve – Bulkington Road, Davoren Park
- Ramsay Park – Womma Road, Edinburgh North
- Smithfield Civic Park – Anderson Walk, Smithfield
- Stebonheath Park – Davoren Road, Andrews Farm
- Womma Park – Womma Road, Edinburgh North

=== Port Adelaide Enfield (part) ===
- Jack Watkins Reserve – Churchill Road, Kilburn
- L.J. Lewis Garden Reserve – Grand Junction Road, Northfield
- Harry Wierda Reserve formerly Regent Gardens Reserve – Sir Ross Smith Boulevard, Oakden
- Stockade Botanical Park – Hoods Road, Northfield

=== Salisbury ===
- Baltimore Reserve – Meredith Street, Parafield Gardens
- Bolivar Road Reserve Dog Park – Bolivar Road, Bolivar
- Carisbrooke Reserve – Main North Road, Salisbury Park
- Dry Creek Linear Park – Walkleys Road, Walkley Heights
- Golding Oval Park Dog Park – Redhill Road, Para Vista
- Happy Home Reserve – Watloo Corner Road, Salisbury North
- Harry Bowey Reserve – Riverside Drive, Salisbury Park
- Jenkins Reserve – Fendon Road, Salisbury Park
- Kentish Green – Barina Avenue, Para Vista
- Linbolm Park – McCarthy Court, Pooraka
- Pitman Pioneer Park – Commercial Road, Salisbury
- Pooraka Triangle Park – South Terrace, Pooraka
- Salisbury North Sports – Bagsters Road, Salisbury North
- The Paddocks – Bridge Road, Para Hills West
- Thomas Turner Reserve – Nelson Road, Valley View

=== Tea Tree Gully ===
- Civic Park – North East Road, Modbury
- Goldenfields Reserve, The Golden Way, Golden Grove
- Bicentennial Drive Pet Park – Bicentennial Drive, Golden Grove
- Jubilee Reserve – Jubilee Way, Wynn Vale
- Modbury Sports Reserve – Ashley Avenue, Ridgehaven

== Western Adelaide ==
The South Australian government region known as Western Adelaide and which occupies the area in the Adelaide metropolitan area located to the north-west of the Adelaide city centre consists of the following local government areas: the City of Charles Sturt, the City of West Torrens and the western half of the City of Port Adelaide Enfield.

=== Charles Sturt ===
- Collins Reserve – Valetta Road, Kidman Park
- Henley Square – Seaview Road, Henley Beach
- Josiah Mitton Reserve / Brompton Park – Burley Griffin Boulevard, Brompton
- Point Malcolm Reserve – Military Road, Semaphore Park
- St. Clair Reserve – Woodville Road, Woodville
- West Lakes Aquatic Reserve – Hero Way, West Lakes

=== Port Adelaide Enfield (part) ===
- Alan Iverson Reserve, Langham Place, Port Adelaide
- Almond Tree Flat Reserve, Centre Street, Largs Bay
- Birkenhead Naval Reserve, Heath Street, Birkenhead
- Catherine Hutton Reserve, Lady Gowrie Drive, North Haven
- Company Square Reserve, Todd Street, Alberton
- Duffield Reserve, Russell Street, Rosewater
- E P Nazer Reserve, Swan Terrace, Semaphore South
- E S P Rogers Reserve, Ellaway Avenue, North Haven
- Eastern Parade Reserve, Eastern Parade, Ottoway
- Emerald Park Reserve, Rosewater Terrace, Ottoway
- Eric Sutton Reserve, Chad Street, Rosewater
- G E Hunter Reserve, Fraser Drive, North Haven
- Goldingham Reserve, Paringa Street, Taperoo
- I W Fotheringham Memorial Reserve, Lady Gowrie Drive, North Haven
- J B Dearing Reserve, Chusan Court, North Haven
- J S Morton Reserve, Fotheringham Road, North Haven
- James Bailey Reserve, Portland Road, Queenstown
- John Hart Reserve, Swan Terrace, Ethelton
- Joyce Snadden Reserve, Minories, Port Adelaide
- Kenmare Street Reserve, Kenmare Street, Taperoo
- Koombana Reserve, Koombana Terrace, Osborne
- Largs North Reserve, Victoria Road, Largs North
- Largs Reserve, Woolnough Road, Largs Bay
- Le Fevre Recreation Reserve Victoria Road, North Haven
- McNicol Reserve, McNicol Terrace, Rosewater
- Montpelier Square Reserve, Montpelier Square, Port Adelaide
- New Haven Reserve, The Walkway, North Haven
- Old Port Canal Gardens, Church Street, Port Adelaide
- One And All Drive Reserve, One And All Drive, North Haven
- Peter Cousins Reserve, Victoria Road, Osborne
- Peter Nicholls Reserve, Hargrave Street, Peterhead
- Phillips Reserve, Swan Terrace, Semaphore South
- Port Adelaide Reserve, Langham Place, Port Adelaide
- Portside Christian Reserve, Bower Road, New Port
- Promenade Newport Reserve, River Frontage, New Port
- R B Connolly Reserve, Grose Crescent, North Haven
- Robin Road Reserve, Robin Road, Semaphore
- Roy Marten Park, Military Road, Taperoo
- Second Street Reserve, Second Street, Wingfield
- St Patricks Square Reserve Melbourne Place, Alberton
- TC Diver Derrick Memorial Reserve, Carlise Street, Glanville
- Timeball Tower Reserve, Esplanade, Semaphore
- Wal Kilpatrick Reserve, Brunswick Avenue, North Haven
- Western Region Reserve, Old Port Road, Port Adelaide
- White Hollow Reserve, Lady Gowrie Drive, Taperoo
- Yandra Street Reserve, Yandra Street, Taperoo
- Yongala Reserve, Yongala Street, Taperoo

=== West Torrens ===
- Anderson Reserve – Anderson Avenue, West Beach
- Cowandilla Reserve – Marion Road, Cowandilla
- Frank Norton Reserve – Torrens Street, Torrensville
- Jubilee Park – Wellington Street, Glandore
- Kings Reserve – Ashwin Parade, Torrensville
- Lockleys Oval – Rutland Avenue, Lockleys
- Mile End Common – Bagshaw Way, Mile End
- Rex Jones Reserve – Park Terrace, North Plympton
- Weigall Oval – Urrbrae Terrace, Plympton
- West Beach Apex Park – Burbridge Road, West Beach
- West Beach Skate Park – Africaine Road, West Beach

== Eastern Adelaide ==
The South Australian government region known as Eastern Adelaide and which occupies the area to the immediate north, east and south of the Adelaide city centre consists of the following local government areas: the City of Adelaide, the City of Burnside, the City of Campbelltown, the City of Norwood Payneham & St Peters, the City of Prospect, the City of Unley and the Town of Walkerville.

=== Adelaide ===
- Adelaide Park Lands

Park Number	Kaurna name	English name	Park Number	Kaurna name	English name	Park Number	Kaurna name	English name
Park 1	Pirltawardli	Possum Park	Park 11	Tainmuntilla	Mistletoe Park	Park 21	Walyu Yarta	Veale Park
Park 2	Pardipardinyilla	Denise Norton Park	Park 12	Karrawirra	Red Gum Park	Park 21W	Mirnu Wirra	Golden Wattle Park
Park 3	Kantarilla	Yam Daisy Park	Park 13	Kadlitpina	Rundle Park	Park 22	Wikaparntu Wirra	Josie Agius Park
Park 4	Kangatilla	Reservoir Park	Park 14	Murlawirrapurka	Rymill Park	Park 23	Wirrarninthi	G S Kingston Park
Park 5	Ngampa Yarta	Bragg Park	Park 15	Ityamai-itpina	King Rodney Park	Park 24	Tampawardli	Ellis Park*
Park 6	Nantu Wama	Lefevre Park	Park 16	Pakapakanthi	Victoria Park	Park 25	Narnungga	Gladys Elphick Park
Park 7	Kuntingga	The Olive Groves	Park 17	Tuthangga	Carriageway Park	Park 26	Tarntanya Wama	Adelaide Oval*
Park 8	Parngutilla	The Olive Groves	Park 18	Wita Wirra	Peppermint Park	Park 27	Tulya Wardli	Bonython Park*
Park 9	Tidlangga	Bundey's Paddock	Park 19	Pityarilla	Pelzer Park	Park 28	Pangki Pangki	Palmer Gardens
Park 10	Warnpangga	Bullrush Park	Park 20	Kurangga	Blue Gum Park	Park 29	Tandotittingga	Brougham Gardens

*These are also the names of smaller parts of the park land within which they are located.

Park/garden	Park number	Locality
Adelaide Botanic Garden	Park 11	North Terrace (east)
Adelaide Golf Links	Park 1	War Memorial Drive (north)
Angas Gardens	Park 12	War Memorial Drive & King William Road
Barr Smith Walk	Park 26 (SW)	River Torrens
Bonython Park	Park 27 (NW)	Port Road (east)
Botanic Park	Park 11	Hackney Road
Brougham Gardens	Park 29	Brougham Place
Bush Magic Play Park	Park 2 (NW)	Fitzroy Terrace
City Sk8 Park*	Park 27 (SE)	North Terrace (west)
Creswell Gardens	Park 26	War Memorial Drive & King William Road
Cross of Sacrifice	Park 12 (NW)	Sir Edwin Smith Avenue & King William Road
Dame Roma Mitchell Gardens	Park 27	Within the walls of the Old Adelaide Gaol
Deceased Workers Memorial Forest	Park 27	near Bonython Park
Edwards Park	Park 23 (SE)	West Terrace
Elder Park	Park 26	King William Road
Ellis Park	Park 24	West Terrace
Esther Lipman Gardens	Park 12 (W)	King William Road & Victoria Drive
Frome Park / Nellie Raminyemmerin Park	Park 11 (W)	Frome Road
Glover Playgrounds	Park 6 (W)	LeFevre Terrace opposite Tynte Street
Glover Playgrounds	Park 15 (SW)	East Terrace & Wakefield Street
Glover Playgrounds	Park 20	South Terrace
Grundy Gardens	Park 12 (E)	Frome Road & Victoria Drive
Helen Mayo Park	Park 27 (SE)	Montefiore Road & River Torrens
Adelaide Himeji Garden	Park 18	South Terrace (east)
John E Brown Park	Park 27 (N)	River Torrens
Kate Cocks Park	Park 27 (SW)	Port Road (east)
Kingston Gardens	Park 23 (NE)	West Terrace
Light's Vision	Park 26 (NW)	Montefiore Hill
Lundie Gardens	Park 21W	South Terrace (west)
Mary Lee Park	Park 27 (N)	Park Terrace
Nellie Raminyemmerin Park / Frome Park	Park 11 (W)	Frome Road
Osmond Gardens	Park 18	South Terrace (east)
Palmer Gardens	Park 28	Palmer Place, North Adelaide
Peace Park	Park 12 (NE)	Sir Edwin Smith Avenue
Pennington Gardens	Park 26 (NE)	Pennington Terrace & King William Road
Pinky Flat	Park 26	War Memorial Drive
Pioneer Women's Memorial Gardens	Park 12 (W)	King William Road
Prince Henry Gardens	Park 12 (S)	North Terrace
Rundle Park	Park 13	East Terrace
Rymill Park	Park 14	East Terrace
Stella Bowen Park	Park 26 (NW)	Pennington Terrace & Montefiore Road
University Oval	Park 12	War Memorial Drive
Veale Gardens	Park 21	South Terrace
Victoria Park	Park 16	East Terrace
Wirranendi	Park 23 (NW)	Sir Donald Bradman Drive

*City Sk8 Park has been replaced by the Biomedical Precinct

- Hindmarsh Square / Mukata
- Hurtle Square / Tangkaira
- Light Square / Wauwi
- Victoria Square / Tarntanyangga
- Whitmore Square / Iparrityi
- Wellington Square / Kudnarto

=== Burnside ===
- Beaumont Common – The Common, Beaumont
- Bellyett Reserve – Cooper Angus Grove, Wattle Park
- Fergusson Square – Fergusson Square, Toorak Gardens
- Hazelwood Park – Greenhill Road, Hazelwood Park
- Kensington Park Reserve – The Parade, Kensington Park
- Langman Reserve,
- Kensington Gardens (Reserve) – The Parade, Kensington Gardens
- Ray Cooper Gardens – Linden Avenue, Hazelwood Park
- Tusmore Park – Rivington Grove, Tusmore
- Warrego Reserve – Warrego Crescent, Linden Park
- Mariner Oval – Mariner Street, Linden Park
- Tregenza Oval – Booth Street, Linden Park
- Austral Park – Austral Avenue, Linden Park

=== Campbelltown ===
- Cambelltown Skate Park – Darley Road, Paradise
- Foxfield Oval Reserve – Maryvale Road, Athelstone
- The Gums Recreation Ground – Shakesphere Avenue, Tranmere
- Thorndon Park Reserve – Hamilton Terrace, Paradise

=== Norwood, Payneham and St Peters ===
- Drage Reserve – Riverside Drive, Felixstow
- Koster Park – Avonmore Avenue, Trinity Gardens
- Payneham Oval – John Street, Payneham
- Richards Park – Osmond Terrace, Maylands

=== Prospect ===
- Broadview Oval – Myponga Terrace, Broadview
- George Whittle Reserve – Churchhill Road, Prospect
- Memorial Gardens – Menzies Crescent, Prospect
- Peppermint Gum Reserve – Barker Road, Prospect
- Prospect Estate Reserve – Prospect Road, Prospect
- St Helens Park – Prospect Road, Prospect

=== Unley ===
- Forest Avenue Reserve – Forest Avenue, Black Forest
- Forrestville Reserve – Ethel Street, Forrestville
- Goodwood Oval – Curzon Avenue, Millswood
- Heywood Park – Addiscombe Place, Unley Park
- Ridge Park Reserve – Glen Osmond Road, Myrtle Bank
- Souter Park – Florence Street, Goodwood
- The Orphanage Reserve – Mitchell Street, Millswood
- Unley Park – Langham Terrace, Unley
- Wayville Reserve – Le Hunte Street, Wayville

=== Walkerville ===
- Howie Reserve – Victoria Terrace, Walkerville
- Levi Park – Vale Street, Vale Park
- Walkerville Recreation Garden – Smith Street, Walkerville
- Webster Reserve – Landsdowne Terrace, Vale Park
- Willow Bend Reserve – Part of the Torrens Linear Park, Vale Park

== Southern Adelaide ==
The South Australian government region known as Southern Adelaide, which occupies the southern end of the Adelaide metropolitan area, consists of the following local government areas: the City of Holdfast Bay, the City of Marion, the City of Mitcham and the City of Onkaparinga.

=== Holdfast Bay ===
- Angus Neill Reserve – Esplanade, Seacliff
- Bindarra Reserve – Beach Road, Brighton
- Colley Reserve – Colley Terrace, Glenelg
- Moseley Square – Jetty Road, Glenelg
- Old Gum Tree Reserve – Cornish Street, Glenelg North
- Wigley Reserve – Adelphi Terrace, Glenelg

=== Marion ===
- Capella Drive Oval and Skate Park – Capella Drive, Hallett Cove
- Edwardstown Soldiers War Memorial Recreation Ground – East Terrace, South Plympton
- Glandore Oval – Naldera Street, Glandore
- Hazelmere Reserve – Oaklands Road, Glengowrie
- Marion Pool Park – Hendrie Street, Park Holme
- Oaklands Reserve – Bombay Street, Oaklands Park
- Serpentine Road Reserve – Serpentine Road, O'Halloran Hill
- Warriparinga – Sturt Road, Bedford Park

=== Mitcham ===
- Avenue Road Reserve – Avenue Road, Cumberland Park
- AA Bailey Reserve – Aldershot Street, Clarence Gardens
- CC Hood Park – Panorama Drive, Pasadena
- Clarendon Recreation Centre – Nicolle Road, Clarendon
- Happy Valley Sports Park – Taylors Road, Aberfoyle Park
- Hawthorndene Reserve – Watahuna Avenue, Hawthorndene
- Karinya Park – Shepherds Hill Road, Eden Hills
- McElligotts Quarry Reserve – Carrick Hill Drive, Springfield
- Mitcham Reserve – Norman Walk, Mitcham
- Mortlock Park – Sturt Avenue, Colonel Light Gardens
- Waite Arboretum – Fullarton Road, Urrbrae
- Wittunga Botanic Garden – Shepherds Hills Road, Blackwood

=== Onkaparinga ===
- Dressage Avenue Reserve – Dressage Avenue, Woodcroft
- Forsyth Reserve – Cottage Lane, Hackham
- John Bice Memorial Oval – Christie Avenue, Christies Beach
- Jubilee Park Adventure Playground – Saltfleet Street, Port Noarlunga South
- Markey Reserve – Patapinda Road, Old Noarlunga
- Moana Beach Recreation Reserve – Esplanade, Moana
- Silver Sands Beach – Esplanade, Aldinga Beach
- Symonds Reserve – Stewart Avenue, Aldinga Beach
- The Quarry Skate Park – Grand Boulevard, Seaford
- Wilfred Taylor Reserve – Wheatsheaf Road, Morphett Vale
- Wilunga Recreation Centre – Railway Terrace, Willunga

== See also ==
- Australia's Open Garden Scheme
- Gardening in Australia
- Heritage gardens in Australia
- Protected areas of South Australia
- List of protected areas in Adelaide
- List of parks and gardens in rural South Australia
