= East End, Adelaide =

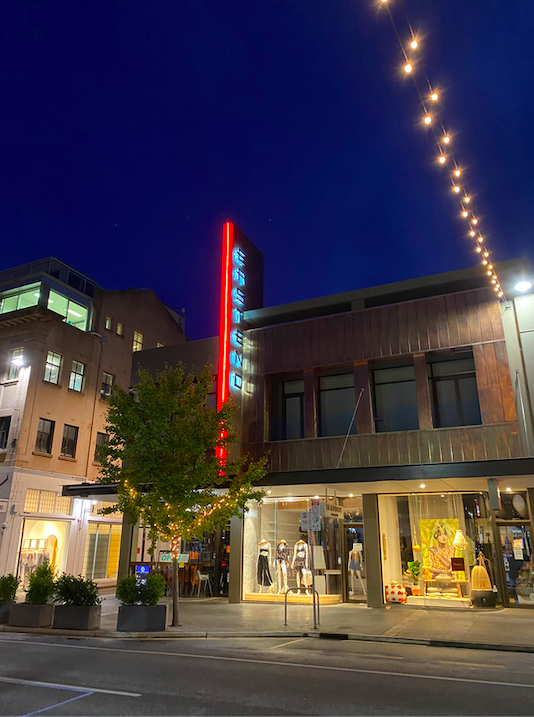
"East End" sign on Rundle St

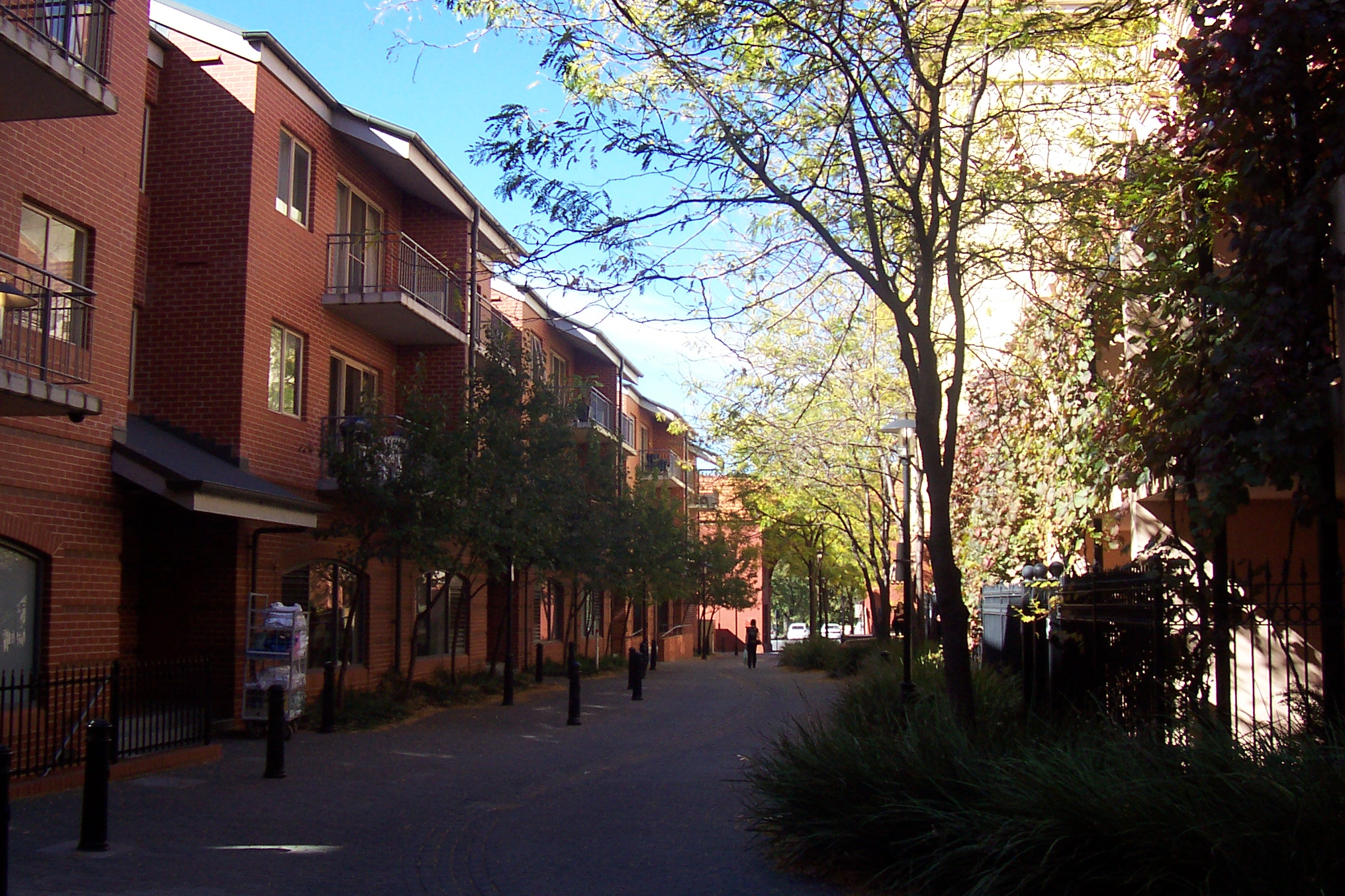
Garden East, 1990s

The East End is a part of the Adelaide central business district, in the north-east corner of the Adelaide city centre. This area is a popular office and retail district and has an increasing residential interest from the building of high-density luxury apartments in the area.

== Description ==
The retail centre of the East End is Rundle Street. Although the area is not officially demarcated, its approximate boundaries are North Terrace, East Terrace, Pulteney Street and Flinders Street. It is also sometimes stated as including parts of Kent Town and parklands locations such as the Adelaide Botanic Gardens, Rymill Park and the National Wine Centre of Australia. Other major streets are Frome Street, Grenfell Street and Pirie Street.

The area is bounded by parklands on the north and east sides, with the west side being mostly bounded by Hindmarsh Square.

== Market redevelopment ==
The eastern end of Rundle Street, with a frontage along East Terrace, was the site of Adelaide's original fruit and vegetable wholesale markets, known as the Adelaide Fruit and Produce Exchange.

The markets closed in the 1980s and, after a long and controversial decision-making process involving some government funding, the Garden East (or East End Astoria) apartment development was built. This was the start of a growing number of prestige apartment buildings in the area. "Building D" was designed by Woods Bagot around 1999.

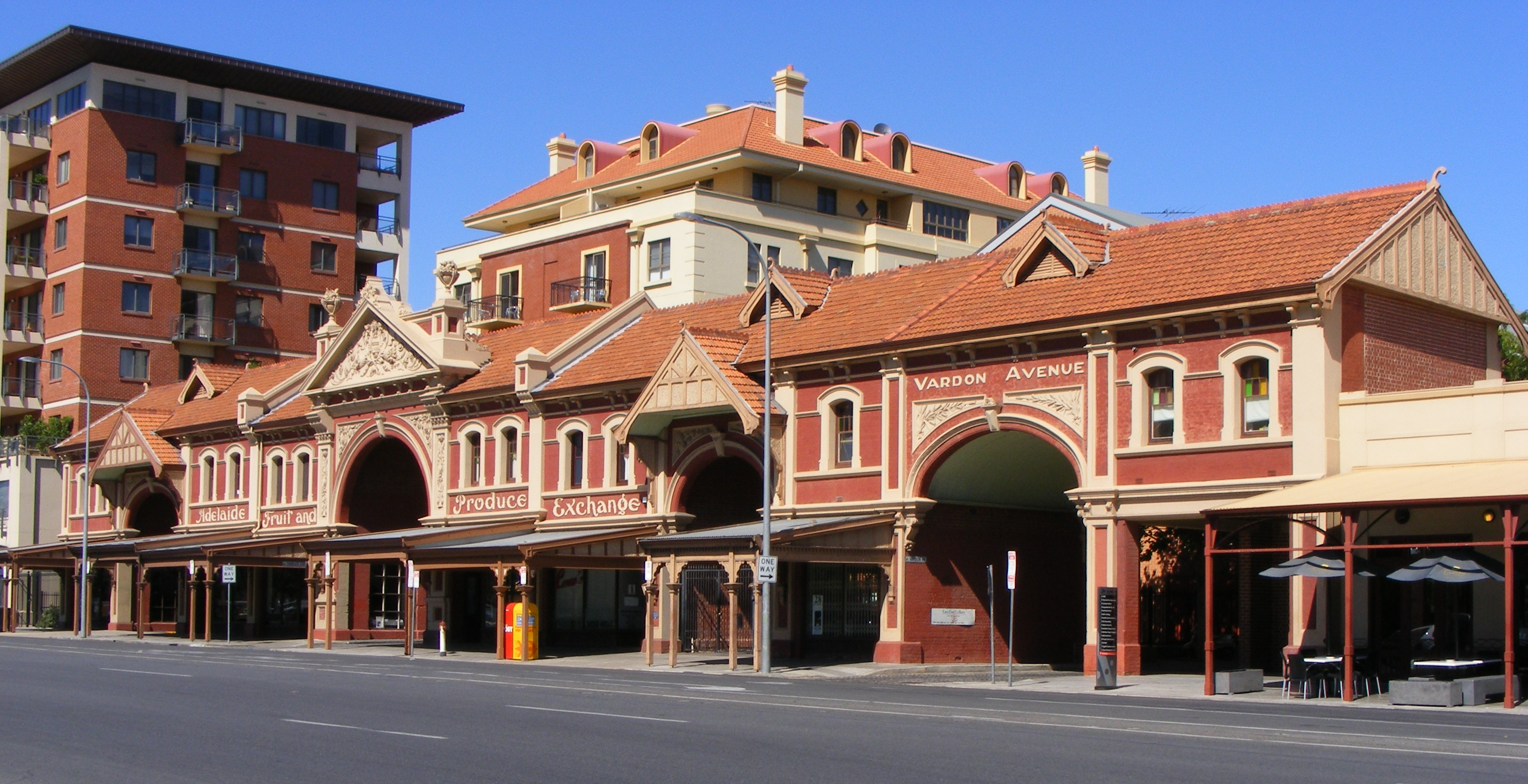
The East End markets facade, showing two of the many new luxury apartment blocks

== Events ==
The East End is a popular spot in Adelaide for large events. These include:

- The Adelaide Fringe
- The preliminary stage (stage 0) of the Tour Down Under. Called the Jacob's Creek Down Under Classic, stage 0 it is a street circuit bicycle race around the four sides of Rymill Park
- The cross-country stage of the Adelaide Horse Trials runs through the parklands and is free entry to all.
- The Adelaide Street Circuit, used for the Adelaide 500, runs through the East End.
