= Rundle Park / Kadlitpina =

Rundle Park
- Kadlitpina
- Rundle Park in 2026

- Location within City of Adelaide
- Type: Urban park
- Location: Adelaide, South Australia, Australia
- Coordinates: 34.921°S 138.613°E
- Area: 6.5 ha (16 acres)
- Etymology: John Rundle
- Operator: City of Adelaide

Rundle Park / Kadlitpina (formerly spelt Kadlitpinna), also known as Park 13, is a part of the Adelaide Park Lands in Adelaide, South Australia. It was known as Rundle Park until its Kaurna name was assigned as part of the dual naming initiative by Adelaide City Council in 2003. The park is bounded by East Terrace (to the west), Botanic Road (north), Dequetteville Terrace (east) and Rundle Road (south).

== Naming ==
John Rundle (1791–1864) was a British Whig politician and businessman who was one of the original directors and financiers of the South Australia Company.

Kadlitpina (earlier rendered Kadlitpinna), known as "Captain Jack" by the early colonial settlers, was one of the three Kaurna burka, or elders well known to the colonists at the time of the colonisation of South Australia. (The other two were Murlawirrapurka ("King John") and Ityamai-itpina ("King Rodney"), whose names are used for the two parks to the south of this one). His name was derived from kadli ("dingo"/"dog") + -itpinna ("father of"). His portrait was painted by George French Angas. Kadlitpina was appointed as an honorary constable; he was issued with a baton and uniform and attended official meetings with the Governor of South Australia.

Light Square / Wauwi was given its dual name after his wife, Wauwe or Wauwi.

== Description ==
The park is bounded by East Terrace (west), Botanic Road (north), Dequetteville Terrace (east) and Rundle Road (south).

Since 2000, in February/March of most years, the park has been the site of the Garden of Unearthly Delights, the first venue hub of the Adelaide Fringe, featuring a variety of music, comedy and theatre shows, as well as food stalls, bars and carnival rides, including a Ferris wheel.

An extension of the O-Bahn Busway passes nearby; it involved connecting Hackney Road and Grenfell Street, with a tunnel being built under Rundle Park.
