= Langman Reserve =

Coordinates: 34.942432450583986°S 138.66524353811076°E

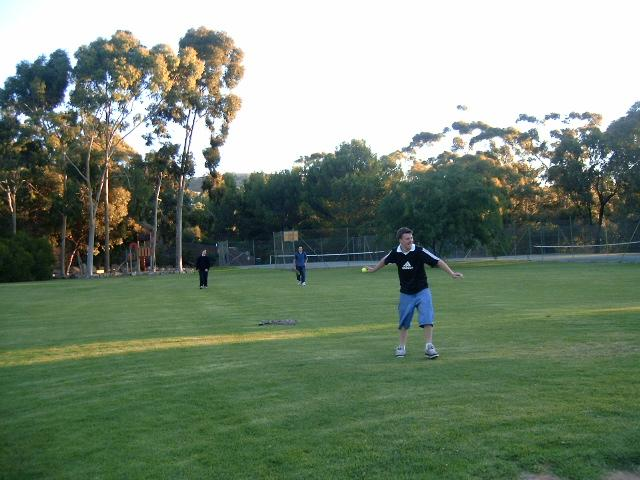
Youth playing a game of cricket on Langman's oval

Langman Reserve is a large reserve situated in the Adelaide foothills between the suburbs of Burnside and Waterfall Gully, South Australia. It was converted from a quarry in the late 1960s, and is named after a former mayor of the City of Burnside. There is an associated trail.

The reserve, frequented by people of all ages, comprises a sporting oval, toilets, barbecues, tennis courts and a walk through native bushland. The carpark is located on Waterfall Gully Road.

== Lookout ==
The reserve contains a noticeable lookout over the city, which also overlooks the park itself. Near the lookout is the plaque dedicated to the mayor whose name was given to the reserve, as well as some old refurbished machinery used in the days of old for children to play on.

== See also ==
- List of Adelaide parks and gardens
