= William Charlick =

Australian merchant

William Charlick (25 March 1858 – 27 July 1926) was a fruit and vegetable merchant in South Australia. He founded the Adelaide Fruit and Produce Exchange on East Terrace.

== History ==
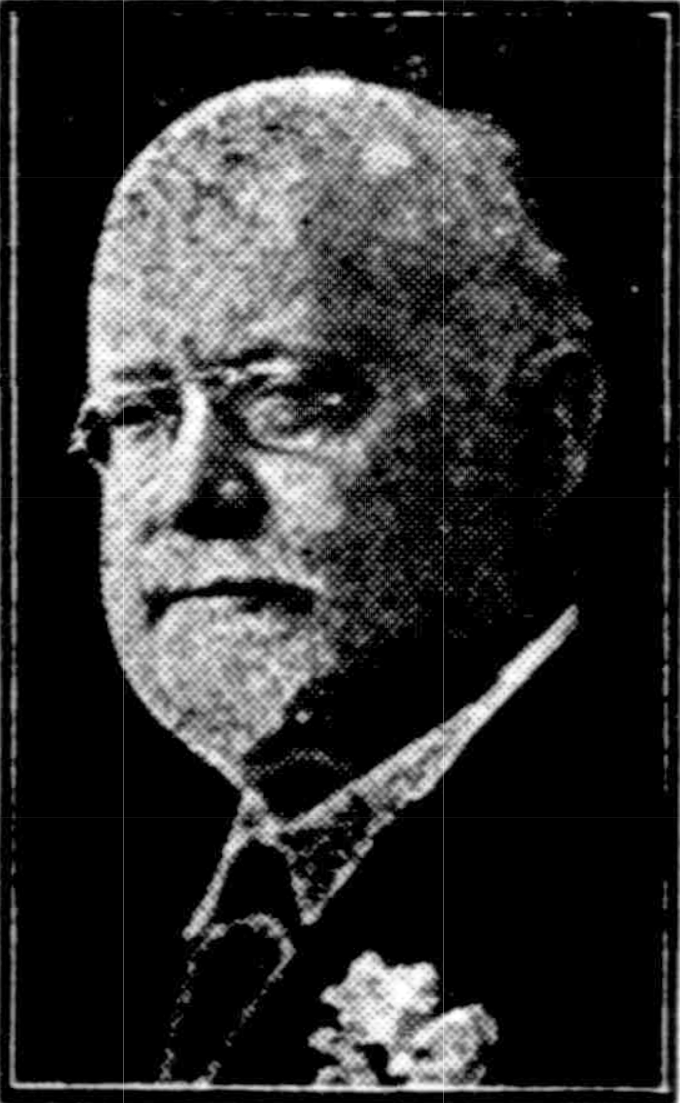
William Charlick

Charlick was born at North Adelaide, the fifth son of Richard Charlick (died 1868), greengrocer, and his wife Janet, née Wilson (c. 1820–1876), who arrived in Adelaide aboard Calphurnia on Good Friday, 6 April 1849. He was educated at Pulteney Street School and found employment in the composing room of The Register.

His brother Robert (died 1914) was buying potatoes and dairy produce from Mount Gambier producers from 1872 or earlier. Albert George Baker (died 1909) was an assistant, later partner. He married Matilda Hooper in 1879, and together they had eight children.

In 1881 Charlick and his brother Frederick (died 1933) joined Robert as Charlick Bros, fruit, potato, grocery and tea merchants at the East-End Market, while Robert had a separate business in Port Adelaide. The two firms became Charlick Brothers in 1887.

By 1902 William Charlick and Frederick Charlick were the only surviving members of the original company, which they dissolved, Frederick taking the tea and grocery side and William taking the wholesale fruit and potato trade.

Charlick took his three sons and accountant into partnership, and the company expanded under the name of William Charlick Limited, Fruit and Produce Exchange. This was a time of rapid growth in the market gardens of the Adelaide Hills, the supply of produce outgrowing the facilities available at the East End Markets, and spilling out onto the streets. He purchased a nearby block of land between Rundle and Grenfell streets, previously the site of Peacock's tannery, slaughterhouse and several run-down residences, and attempted thereby to create an extension of the existing Markets but was unable to reach an agreement with the East-End Market Company. He then applied to the Legislature for a special Act empowering him to establish a market on the site. Parliament found the prospect of competition appealing, as did the Adelaide Corporation and the general public, and the Bill was passed in August 1903. Amongst other conditions, it restricted the market to exceed four acres, to be completed within five years, and giving the Corporation the option of purchasing the site after a certain date. A company with a capital of £40,000 was floated, with persons in the trade having first option to purchase. The memorial stone was laid by Governor of South Australia Le Hunte,

"This market was founded by special Act of Parliament granted to Wm. Charlick, merchant, A.D. 1903 in the reign of King Edward VII. — Sir Geo. Le Hunte, K.C.M.G., Governor, Lewis Cohen Esq., M.P., Mayor. God save the King.

and eight days later "The Adelaide Fruit and Produce Exchange Company, Limited" was formed, with Charlick elected chairman of directors, which position he held until February 1925, when he retired. The secretary was fellow-religionist T. H. Brooker and Joseph Vardon was a powerful supporter.

=== Other interests ===
Charlick founded City Flour Mills, and South Australian Cold Stores Limited, at Hilton, and had interests in several other companies.

He was a keen gardener, interested in cultivation of flowers. He followed cricket avidly, and reading was a favorite pastime. He remained well-informed on current affairs. He was a Justice of the Peace, and was chairman of the Rundle Street decoration committee for the visit of the Duke and Duchess of Cornwall and York from 9 to 15 July 1901.

=== Religion ===
Charlick originally attended the Zion Christian Church on Hanson street, later joined the Church of Christ in Park street, Unley (founded 1885), with which he had a long association, as principal of the Sunday School. Later she attended the parent church on Grote Street, becoming conference president in 1902 and 1923, and other senior posts.

== Family ==
Richard and Janet Charlick had six sons:

- Henry Charlick (1845–1916) chess master, newspaperman
- Robert Charlick (1849–1914) merchant
- John Charlick (1854–1879) chess master, chess problem composer
- Walter Charlick (1856–1911) fruiterer of Earl & Charlick
- William Charlick (1858–1926) married Matilda Hooper in 1879. They had eight children:

- (Richard) Harold Charlick (1880–1937) married Agnes Bertha Buchanan on 26 March 1903
- Muriel Backer/Baker Charlick (1881–1942)
- Beatrice Brunt Charlick (1883– ) married Cliff Victor Mann on 20 April 1912
- Gordon William Charlick (21 July 1885 – 1970) married Grace Wheatley Taylor on 19 September 1908
- John Leonard Charlick (6 June 1887 – 1942) married Winifred Matilda James on 6 November 1909

- Gladys Muriel Charlick (1920– )

- Oswald George Charlick (5 June 1891 – 1970) married Florence May Young on 11 August 1910, lived at Tooperang

- Ronald William Charlick (1914–1985) married Dorothy Rena McKenzie in 1938

- Frederick Charlick (1862–1933)
