= Tandanya National Aboriginal Cultural Institute =

Museum of Aboriginal Australian culture

- Tandanya in 2026
- Established: 1989
- Location: 253 Grenfell Street, Adelaide, South Australia
- Coordinates: 34.9241°S 138.6105°E
- Director: Brenz Saunders
- Website: www.tandanya.com.au

The Tandanya National Aboriginal Cultural Institute, usually referred to as Tandanya, is an art museum and performance space located on Grenfell Street in Adelaide, South Australia. It specialises in promoting Indigenous Australian art, including visual art, music, and storytelling, and has been used as a venue for Adelaide Fringe performances. It is the oldest Aboriginal-owned and -run cultural centre in Australia. It has been closed for building repairs since May 2023 and is due to reopen in February 2026.

== Naming ==
The institute derives its name from Tarndanya, the Kaurna Aboriginal people's name for the Adelaide city centre and parklands area, meaning "place of the red kangaroo".

== History ==
Tandanya is the oldest Aboriginal-owned and -run cultural centre in Australia, opened in 1989. The first exhibition featured artworks on silk created by women from Utopia in the Northern Territory, entitled Utopia — A Picture Story.

Since then it has hosted a variety of exhibitions and events, including Adelaide Fringe performances and the national launch of the Indigenous Voice to Parliament's Yes campaign in February 2023.

=== Building ===
It is housed in the old Grenfell Street Power Station (later a TAFE college) at the eastern end of Grenfell Street in the Adelaide city centre, also the office headquarters of the South Australian Electric Light and Motive Power Company. The original building dates from 1901, but it was extensively modified and rebuilt in 1912–13, including the Palladian-style facade. The building was heritage-listed on the SA Heritage Register in November 1984. There is an "Historic Engineering Plaque" on a ground level plinth just east of the north-east corner of the building, which was dedicated by the Institution of Engineers, Australia, the Electricity Trust of South Australia and the Adelaide City Council on 6 April 1995.

The building is owned by the Aboriginal Lands Trust.

==== Building repairs ====
The building has been subject to many closures since 2020, not only during the COVID-19 pandemic, but also owing to numerous maintenance problems. The state government has invested in repairs and renewal of air-conditioning units, sprinkler heads, internal walls, electrical work, painting, and carpets. In 2023 there were improvements to fire safety components and emergency and exit lighting. It was due to re-open in January 2025, after "temporary" closure in April 2023. The Malinauskas government contributed A$780,000 towards the repair and upgrade work.

Discussions have taken place over several years about the new Aboriginal Art and Cultures Centre (AACC; a.k.a. Tarrkarri Centre for First Nations Cultures) as part of the Lot Fourteen precinct on North Terrace; however, a decision on Tarrkarri was still pending in October 2025 as the government sought major philanthropic funding for the new site.

The building closed temporarily in April 2023 for repairs and a major refurbishment, and is now due to reopen in February 2026. The state government provided funding of $780,000 for repairs, which included replacement of air-conditioning units and sprinkler heads, repair work on internal walls, electrical work, interior painting, and replacement of carpets.

== Governance, funding, and functions ==
Management of the building and land on which Tandanya is located come under the Aboriginal Lands Trust Act 1966, while its operations as an organisation fall within the state Minister for Arts portfolio area. The building is very old, and large parts of the building and sometimes the whole building have been closed to the public in recent years (2020s) owing to maintenance needs.

The core activities of Tandanya, as listed in its 2015-6 Annual Report, were: visual arts (exhibitions program); performing arts (events, theatre and performances); community arts (public art); cultural performances and information; school education activities; cultural and artistic tours; Indigenous infused café; Gallery Shop retailing Aboriginal & Torres Strait Islander artworks. The centre was then governed by a 10-member board of Aboriginal and/or Torres Strait Islander descent and residing in South Australia. A chief executive officer is responsible for its day-to-day operations. The 2021/2022 annual report showed a loss of $284,000, due to ageing infrastructure and therefore not being able to host Adelaide Fringe events, COVID-19 restrictions, gaps in the workforce, and other reasons.

Funding of Tandanya was formerly through the federal government arts funding body Australia Council for the Arts (now Creative Australia) on a four-yearly cycle, including in 2016. In May 2020, two months after closure owing to the COVID-19 pandemic in South Australia, the organisation was informed that it would no longer receive funding through the Australia Council. Other funding has come in through use of the building as a venue for Adelaide Fringe performances, various grants and other funding avenues, and its two streams of paid membership (Friends of Tandanya, non-Indigenous people; and paid membership for Aboriginal and Torres Strait Islander members of Tandanya, which also gives them a voice in the running of Tandanya, and the ability to nominate to become a board member).

=== People ===
Dennis Stokes was CEO from mid-2018 until June 2021. He was succeeded by Kirstie Parker on an interim basis until late January 2022, when Nancia Guivarra took on the role as acting CEO. Phillip Saunders took over as interim CEO sometime before February 2023.

As of September 2024, Phillip Saunders and Lee-Ann Tjunypa Buckskin were co-CEOs. Buckskin was appointed artistic director in April 2024.

In September 2025, Brenz Saunders (no relation to Phillip) was appointed CEO. He was previously chairperson of Tauondi Aboriginal College.

As of October 2025 the board was headed by chair Aaron Ken, with Lila Berry as deputy chair. Other board members were Celia Coulthard, Tapaya Edwards, Eddie Newchurch, Neville Rankine, and Daniel Riley (of Australian Dance Theatre).

== 21st-century activities ==
The centre runs programs and performances as part of NAIDOC Week.

Since 2015 the centre has hosted the annual Art Fair, part of the Tarnanthi Festival of Contemporary Aboriginal and Torres Strait Islander Art each year. It has also been the venue of many Adelaide Fringe performances.

In 2020, with its 30th-anniversary celebrations interrupted by being forced to close for over six months due to the COVID-19 pandemic in Australia, Tandanya re-opened in October with an exhibition called Atnwengerrp — Our Apmere, Our Place, which included the work of five of the original women whose work was shown in the first ever exhibition at the gallery. During its closure, the space was used to create Still Stylin' 2020 a seven-minute musical video montage featuring reworked songs by Christine Anu. Directed by Larrakia rapper Jimblah, it featured First Nations dancers, rappers, and artists, performing in Tandanya and on country.

On 13 November 2020, as part of NAIDOC Week celebrations, the centre hosted a new music festival called TREATY, featuring established and emerging First Nations musicians from South Australia. Performers included J-Milla, Sonz of Serpent, Dem Mob, RKM (Rulla Kelly-Mansell), Tilly Tjala Thomas, MRLN (Marlon Motlop) and Katie Aspel, with Natasha Wanganeen sharing the presenting with J-Milla.

Following its reopening after a major refurbishment in February 2026, in collaboration with the Adelaide Fringe hub Gluttony (located over the road in Rymill Park/Mullawirraburka), Tandanya will host performances in a special program featuring 55 per cent Indigenous cast and crew. A return of the Spirit Festival – a defunct festival of Indigenous culture – is planned, along with more events for the Aboriginal community.

== Collection ==
Tandanya has a collection of around 3000 pieces, including paintings, artefacts, wood carvings, ancient stones, spear tips, and ochre-making stones. However, provenance has not been established, as the institute was not set up as a collector, and a thorough audit needs to be done.

== See also ==
- List of music museums
- Tarndanyangga
