= Park 10 =

Park in Adelaide, Australia

- Bullrush Park / Warnpangga
- Location within City of Adelaide
- Type: Urban park and sporting grounds
- Location: North Adelaide, South Australia, Australia
- Coordinates: 34°54′39″S 138°36′29″E
- Operator: City of Adelaide
- Status: Open to the public
- Website: www.experienceadelaide.com.au/notable-locations/bullrush-root-place/

Park 10, also known as Bullrush Park and Warnpangga is one of the Adelaide Park Lands in the city of Adelaide, South Australia. It is one of the few parks (in the Adelaide Park Lands) to still be known most commonly by its assigned number, and is enclosed by McKinnon Parade, Bundey's Road, War Memorial Drive and Frome Road. The park is used extensively by University of Adelaide sporting clubs.

Park 10 is officially used by the Adelaide University Cricket and Football Clubs (Park 10 Oval), Adelaide University Lacrosse Club (Park 10 Lacrosse Field) the Adelaide University Lawn Tennis Club (Park 10 Tennis Courts), and elite running squads Team Tempo and Team Daly.

The Adelaide University Frisbee Club use the space behind the Park 10 football posts, and the Adelaide University Soccer Club use the Park 10 Reserve Soccer field. (This is also the Lacrosse Training Field.) The Adelaide University Athletics Club use the space between the Lacrosse game field and Park 10 oval.

The Uni Loop is a popular running track, 2.2 kilometres in length, which encircles the park. It has hosted a yearly 6-hour ultramarathon since 2009, a 12-hour ultramarathon since 2010 and a 24-hour ultramarathon since 2011.

The Park 10 Grandstand was refurbished by the University of Adelaide in the early 2000s.

Due to drought conditions forcing the closure of the Waite Campus sports fields, the Adelaide University Rugby Club was temporarily moved to the Graduate's Oval in Park 10 during May and June 2007. This was the first time rugby had been played on the university's City of Adelaide sports grounds since the 1980s.

== See also ==
- List of Adelaide parks and gardens
