= West Beach Skate Park =

Skatepark in West Beach, South Australia

Coordinates: 34.960359°S 138.511982°E

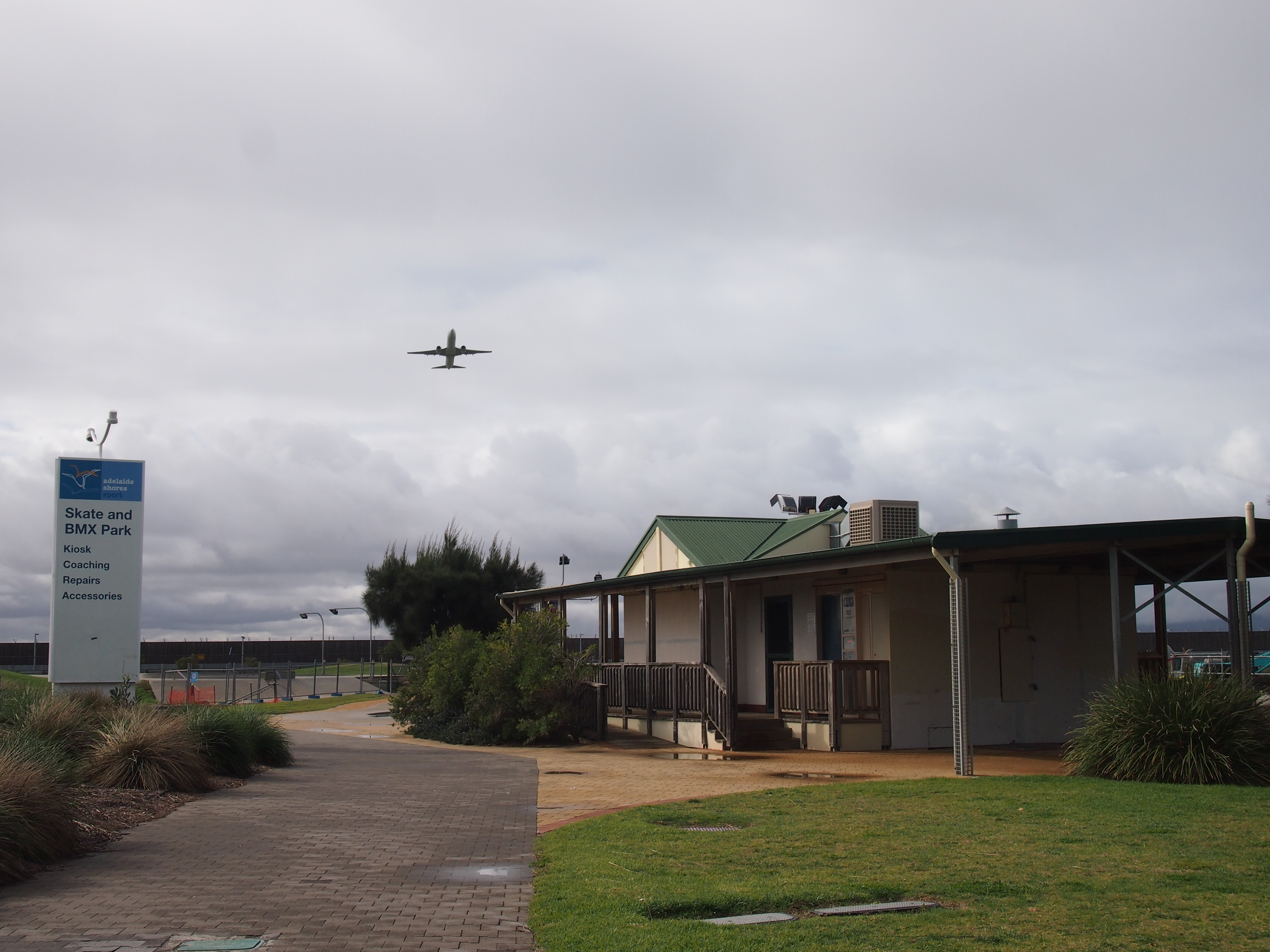
West Beach Skate Park lies under the flight path of Adelaide Airport

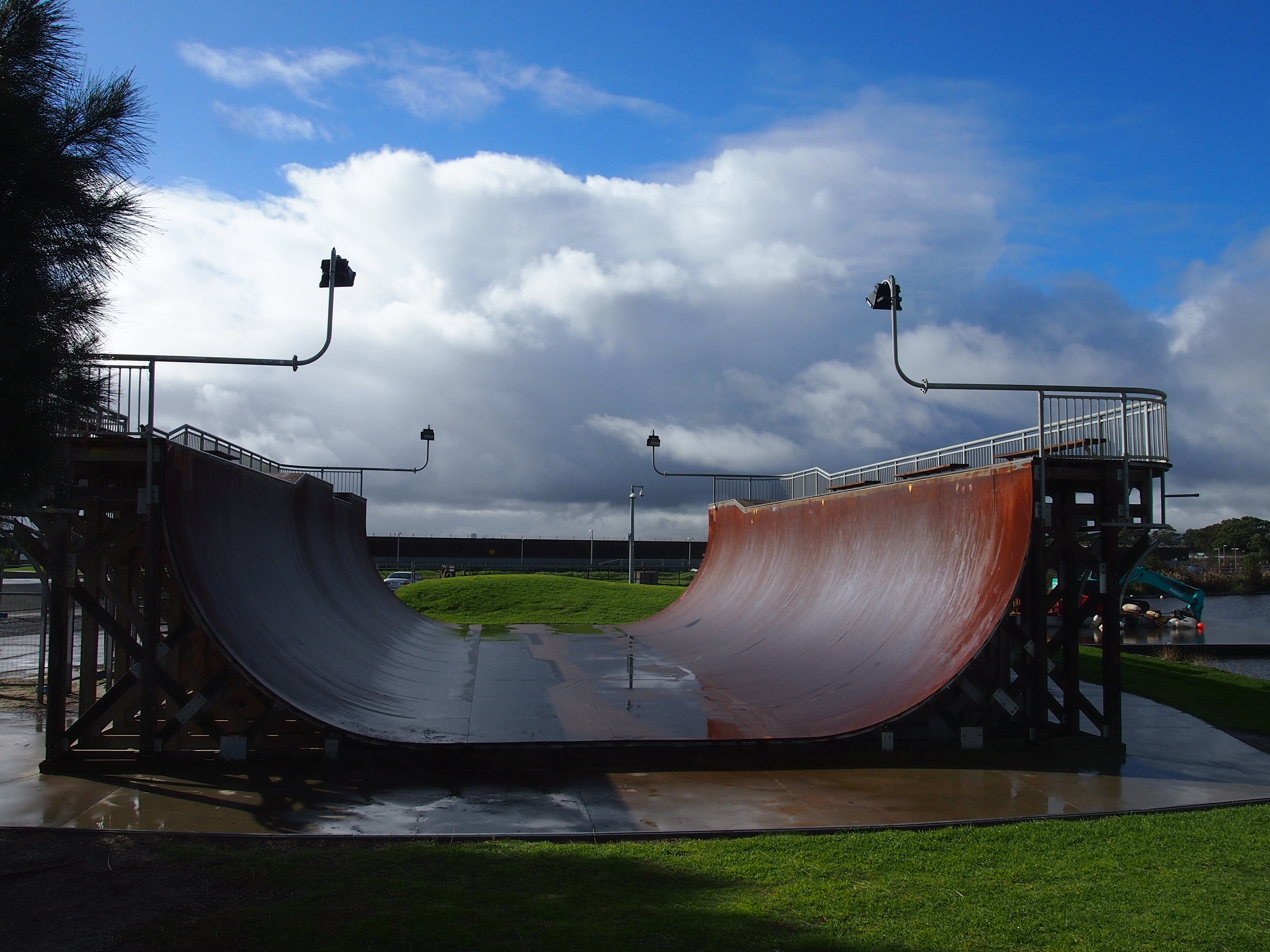
West Beach Skate Park - half-pipe

The West Beach Skate Park, also known as the Adelaide Shores Skate and BMX Park, is a skatepark in West Beach, South Australia, a beach-side suburb of Adelaide. It is located in Africaine Street, between Military Road and Tapleys Hill Road, 10 kilometers west of the city centre and near the Adelaide Airport.

The park has a 4 metres (13 feet) vert ramp with extensions and 18 metres (59 feet) wide, making it one of the biggest vert ramps in the Southern Hemisphere. The park also has a large bowl as well as a beginners’ bowl, rails, small quarters and a street circuit. Lights enable safe evening skating. The park also contains a dirt BMX track with a series of jumps. Tony Hawk visited the park in 2009.

The ramp and bowls were designed and built commencing in 2000, and include a kiosk and BBQ facilities. The BMX track was added in 2004. Secondary school students were involved in the construction of the park and its various stages.

The skate park hosts regular events, including the first South Australian pro scooter competition on 16 and 17 March 2013.

== Web cam ==
A webcam exists to provide views of the skate park.

== See also ==
- List of Adelaide parks and gardens
