= East Terrace =

Street in Adelaide, South Australia

East Terrace South Australia
- Coordinates: 34.920962°S 138.610767°E (North end); 34.934777°S 138.617781°E (South end)

General information
- Type: Street
- Location: Adelaide city centre
- Length: 2.1 km (1.3 mi)
- Opened: 1837

Major junctions
- North end: North Terrace; Botanic Road; Adelaide
- Grenfell Street; Wakefield Street; Halifax Street
- South end: South Terrace; Beaumont Road; Adelaide

Location(s)
- LGA(s): City of Adelaide

East Terrace is a road that marks the eastern edge of the Adelaide city centre in Adelaide, South Australia.

== Description ==
East Terrace is one of the main north–south thoroughfares through the east side of the city.

Although the terrace essentially runs north–south between North Terrace and South Terrace, unlike Adelaide's other three terraces, its path is far from a straight line; travelling the entire length of East Terrace requires turning at right angles at most intersections from Pirie Street onwards. The traffic flow, after a swerve to the east between Grenfell and Pirie Streets, continues southwards over the Pirie intersection into Hutt Street and on down to South Terrace.

After crossing South Terrace, East Terrace continues through the parklands as Beaumont Road, but unlike other roads through the parklands it is not a thoroughfare; there is a break in the middle of it.

The terrace marks the eastern edge of Colonel William Light's plan for the City of Adelaide. Between Grenfell Street and North Terrace, it also forms the boundary of Adelaide's East End.

East Terrace separates the city centre from the eastern parts of the Parklands, running adjacent to Parks 13 (Rundle Park / Kadlitpina), 14 (Rymill Park), 15 (Ityamaiitpinna), and 16 (Victoria Park). The western edge of the terrace is occupied by shops, restaurants, cafes, office buildings, professional, consulting and medical practises, residences, a school, and a number of churches and pubs.

Since July 2012, a dedicated bus lane in both directions has existed between Grenfell Street and North Terrace.

== Historic buildings ==
=== Grenfell Street Power Station ===
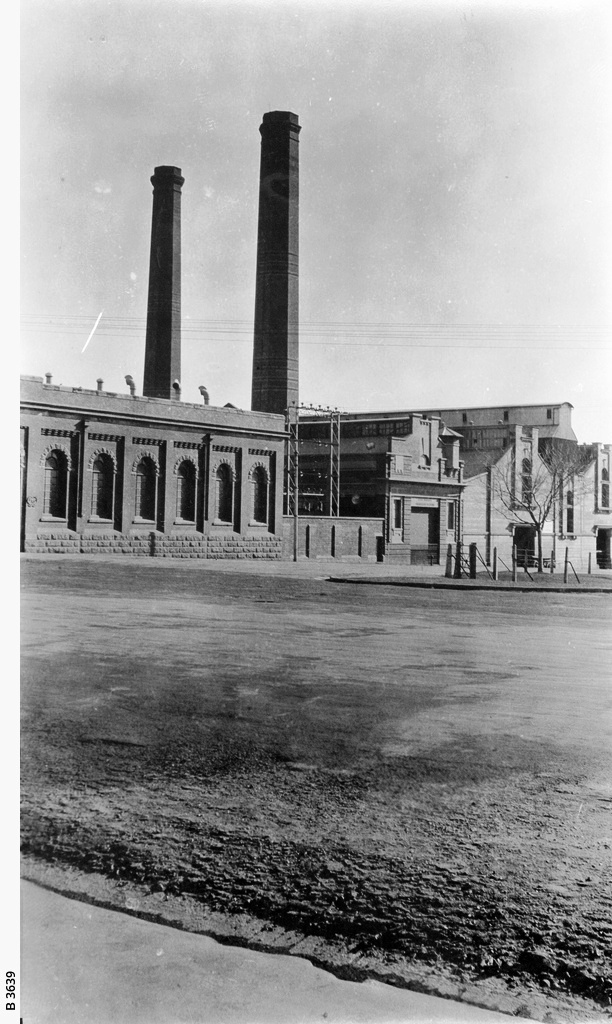
Adelaide Electric Supply Co. power station, c.1926

On the corner of Grenfell Street and East Terrace there is the old Grenfell Street Power Station building. Much of the building now houses the Tandanya National Aboriginal Cultural Institute, facing Grenfell Street (which was heritage-listed on the SA Heritage Register in November 1984), but the old converter stations face East Terrace. There is an "Historic Engineering Plaque" on a ground level plinth just east of the north-east corner of the Tandanya building, which was dedicated by the Institution of Engineers, Australia, the Electricity Trust of South Australia and the Adelaide City Council on 6 April 1995.

=== East End Markets ===
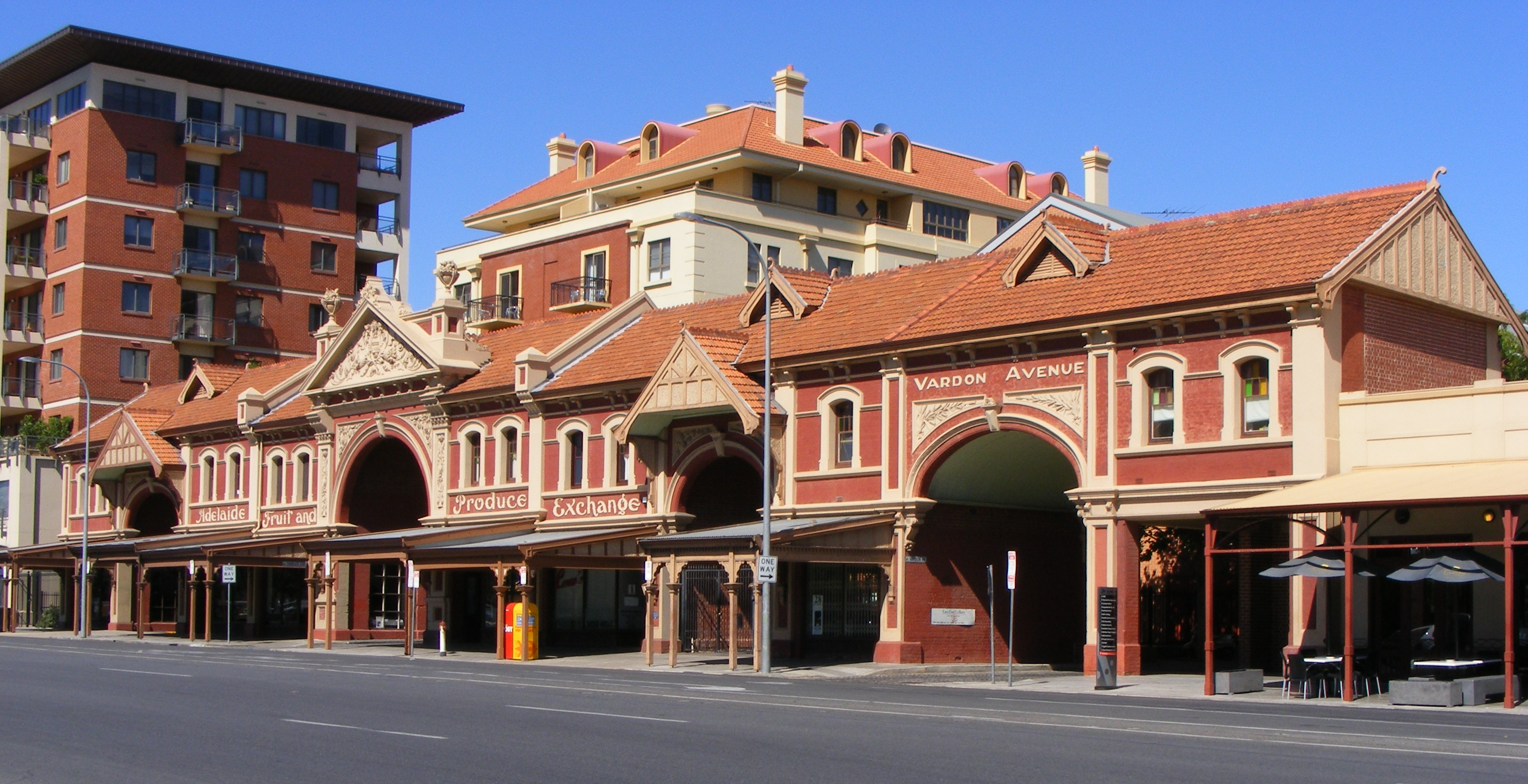
The facade of the former Fruit and Produce Exchange building

Adelaide's original wholesale fruit and vegetable market was supplemented by a competitor: William Charlick's Adelaide Fruit and Produce Exchange, which opened for business in May 1904, developing a long frontage along East Terrace between Grenfell and Rundle streets.

The markets closed in the 1980s and, after a long and controversial decision-making process involving some government funding, the Garden East (or East End Astoria) apartment development was built. This was the start of a growing number of prestige apartment buildings in the area. "Building D" was designed by Woods Bagot around 1999.
