= Jack Watkins Reserve =

Park in Kilburn, Australia

- Location within City of Port Adelaide Enfield Location within South Australia Location within Australia
- Type: landmark
- Location: Kilburn, South Australia
- Coordinates: 34°51′41″S 138°34′54″E
- Operator: City of Port Adelaide Enfield

Jack Watkins Reserve is a park in the Australian state of South Australia situated adjacent to the Islington Railway Workshops in the suburb of Kilburn within the local government area of City of Port Adelaide Enfield. The park was named after Jack Watkins, a union organiser and former president of The Asbestos Diseases Society of South Australia who successfully lobbied to remove asbestos and other toxic contaminants from the railway site and adjacent properties. The park was opened in late August 2003 as a tribute to the large number of former railway workers who succumbed to asbestos-related diseases while working at the yard.

The park contains a memorial walkway leading to a central memorial featuring four pillars, inscribed Tough Times, Strength, mates and ratbags. The park also contains a playground, public murals, barbecue facilities and a dog park. A memorial service is held each year in the park on 24 November to honour the victims of asbestos related disease.

On 25 November 2016, the day after Asbestos Victims Memorial Day, the park was shut indefinitely due to eight pieces of asbestos being found, risking a health hazard to members of the public. Mayor Gary Johanson stated that "someone deliberately went and seeded the reserve with asbestos particles". The park has since been decontaminated and reopened while a full investigation is underway

== See also ==
- List of Adelaide parks and gardens
