= Carnevale in Adelaide =

Annual festival in Adelaide, South Australia

Carnevale in Adelaide is an annual Italian festival held in Adelaide, South Australia, which follows the centuries-old Christian tradition of Carnevale which is the last celebration before Ash Wednesday and the beginning of Lent – see Carnival.

== History ==
The first Carnevale in Adelaide was held in 1976 in Rundle Mall. A parade travelled from Victoria Square to Elder Park before ending with celebrations in Rundle Mall. It was originally called The Italian Festival and is now known as Carnevale in Adelaide. The festival has been held in a number of locations over the years including Rundle Mall, Elder Park, Norwood and Adelaide Ovals, Rymill Park. In 2015 it was held at The Adelaide Showground

It is a means of inspiring young people to embrace their Italian heritage and for the wider community to experience Italian culture. The event also raises funds to cater for welfare needs of the elderly in the Italian community through the Co-ordinating Italian Committee (CIC) and supports other worthy charities and community organisations.

=== 1976 ===
Inaugural Italian Festival held in Rundle Mall.

=== 2007 ===
Held 10–11 February at Rymill Park.

=== 2012 ===
Held 11–12 February at The Adelaide Showground.

=== 2013 ===
Held 9–10 February at The Adelaide Showground.

=== 2014 ===
Held 8–9 February at The Adelaide Showground.

=== 2015 ===
Held 7–8 February at The Adelaide Showground.

=== 2016 ===
Held 6–7 February at The Adelaide Showground.

== Program ==
The program includes live music, activities for children, dance, comedy, Mr and Miss Carnevale competition, fireworks, food and drink, cooking demonstrations, Italian cars on display, fashion parades, the national sausage making competition and screenings of Italian films and documentaries.
