= City Sk8 Park, Adelaide =

Skateboarding facility in South Australia

Coordinates: 34°55′18″S 138°35′33″E

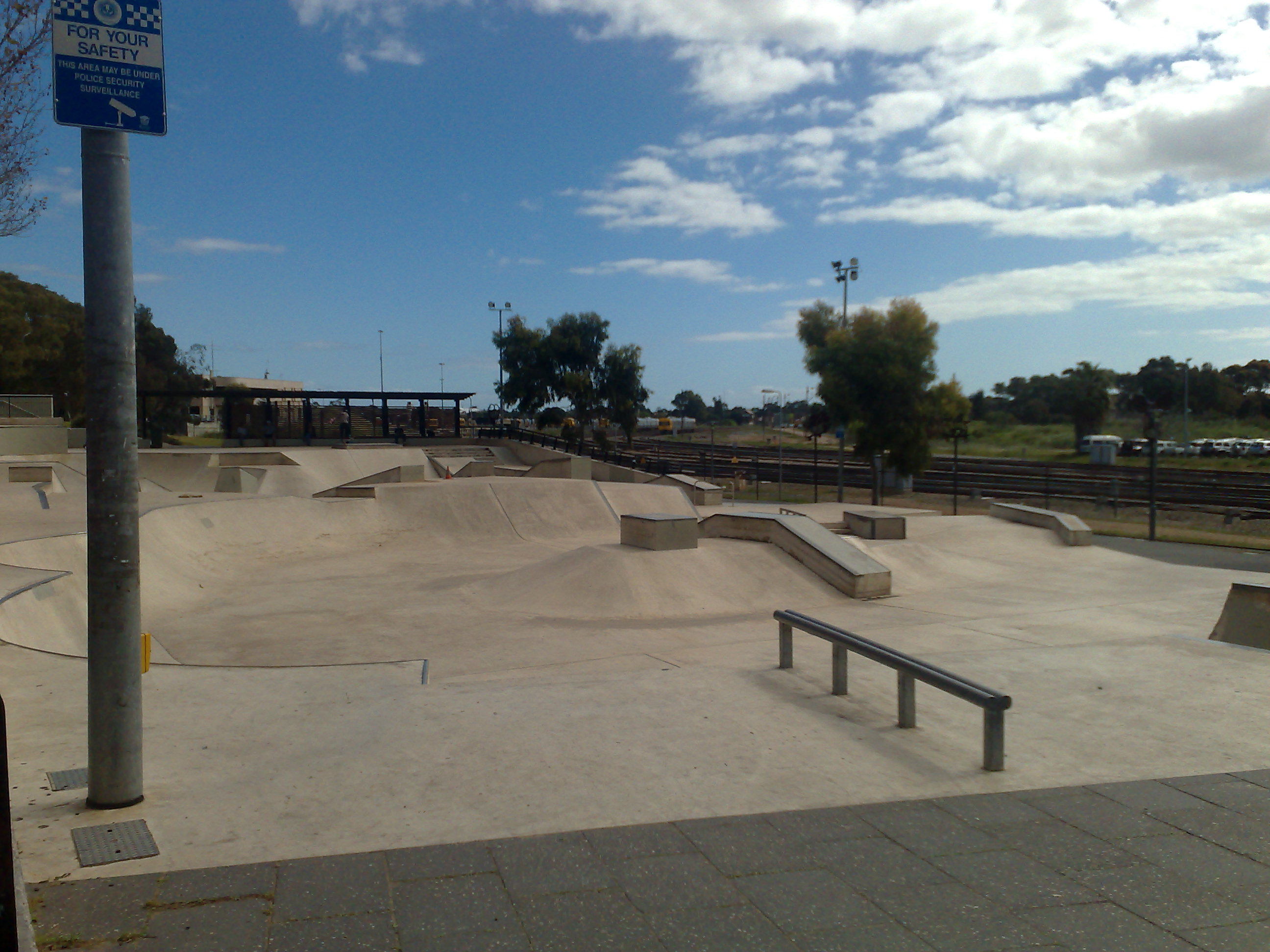
The skate park from the South-Eastern corner.

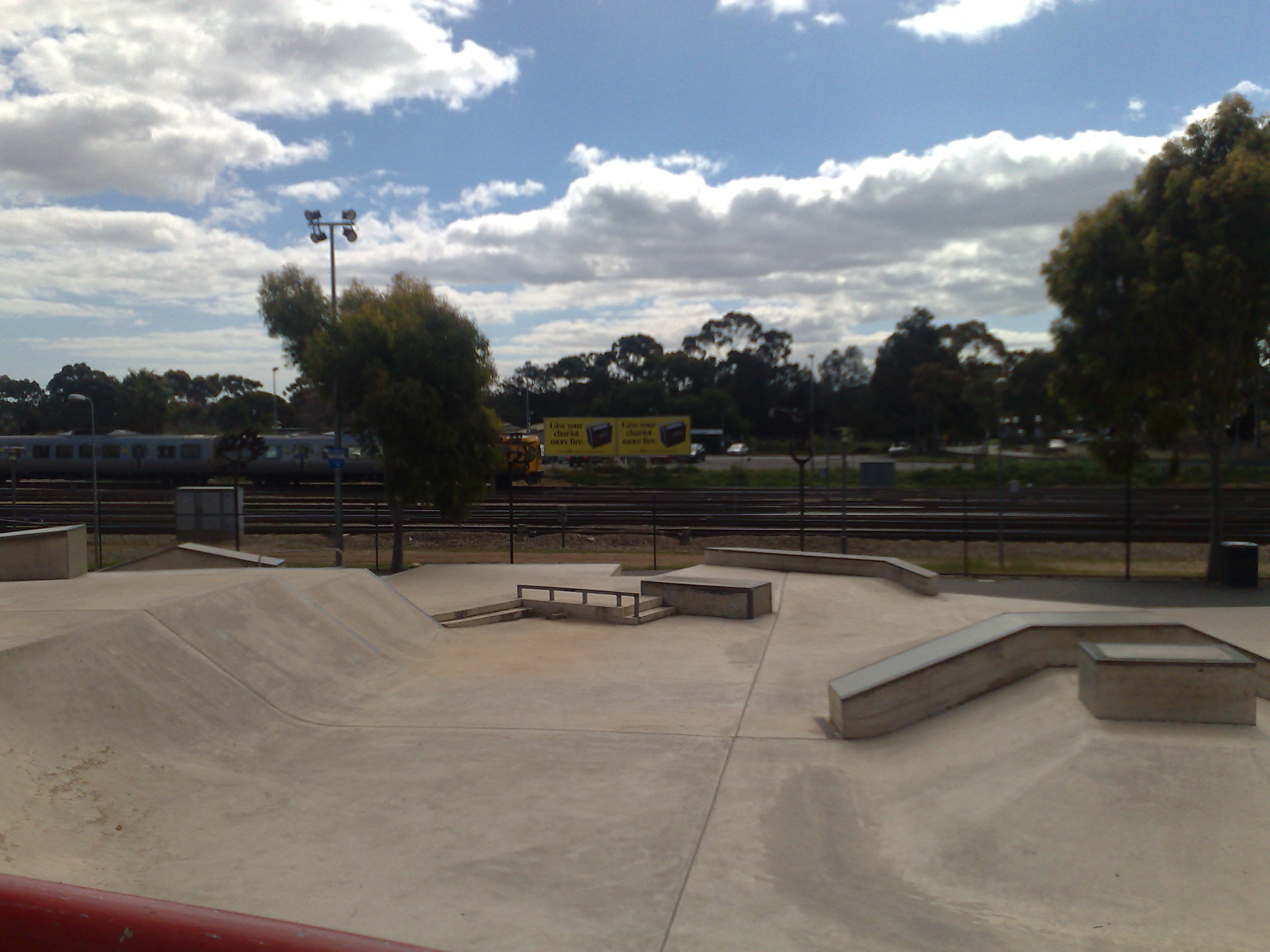
The skate park from the South, with the rail line to Adelaide railway station in the background

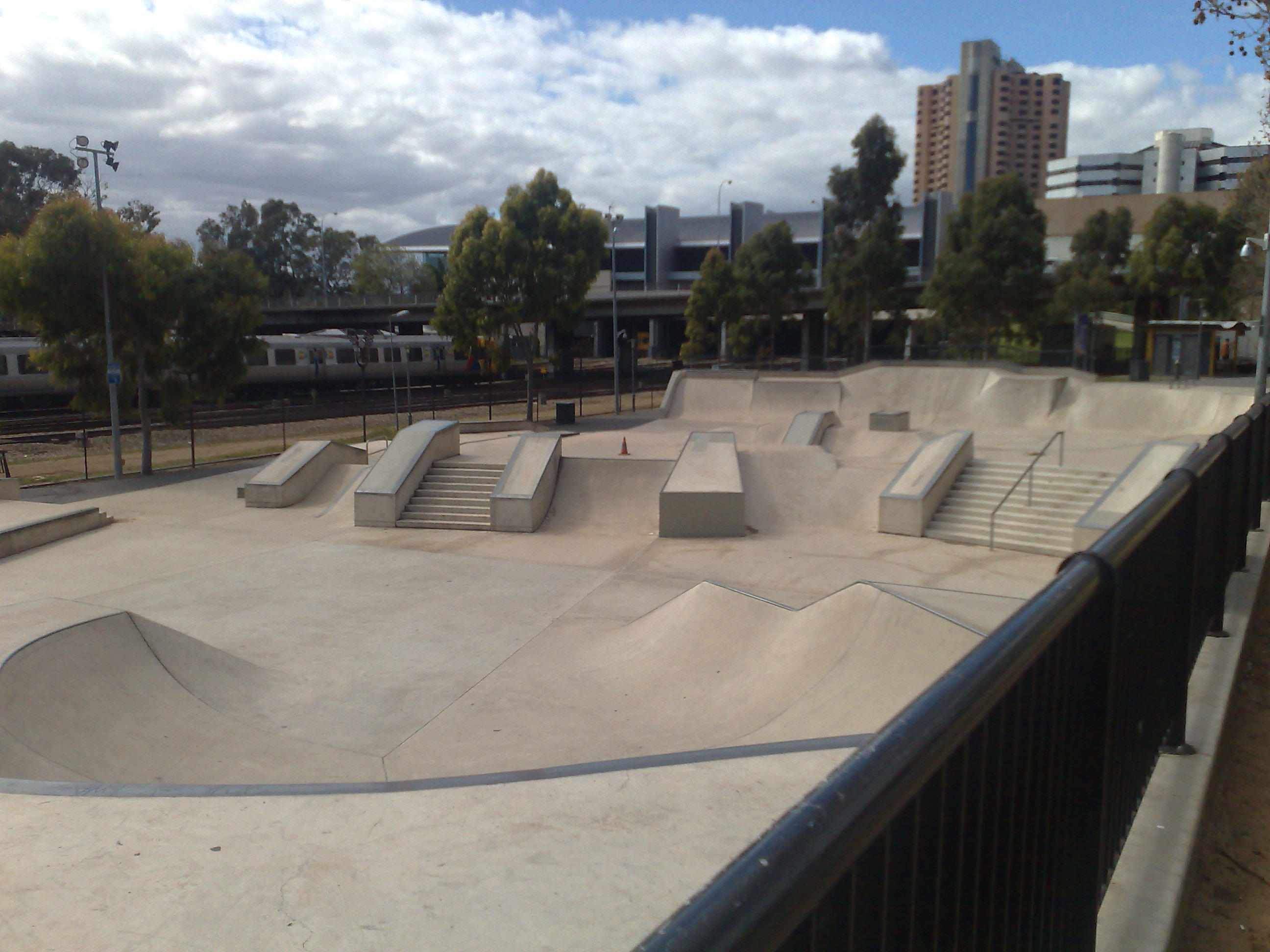
The skate park from the North-Eastern corner.

City Sk8 Park was a skate-boarding facility situated in Park 27 of the Adelaide Park Lands on North Terrace, in Adelaide, South Australia. It was located next to the railway tracks and the Morphett Street Bridge.

Skaters could use the facility day and night as the park was equipped with lighting and camera surveillance. The Park had sheltered seating and featured a range of vertical drops, half bowls, steps, blocks, ramps and slopes. The facility was highly visible to passers-by, helping to ensure the safety of skaters. Dogs on leads were allowed, but not in the skate park itself for their own safety.

This facility was demolished during late 2015, despite a local campaign to save it, in preparation for the relocation of Adelaide's Bio-medical precinct from the east end to the west end of North Terrace.
