= Grenfell Street =

Street running east-west across Adelaide city centre

Grenfell Street South Australia
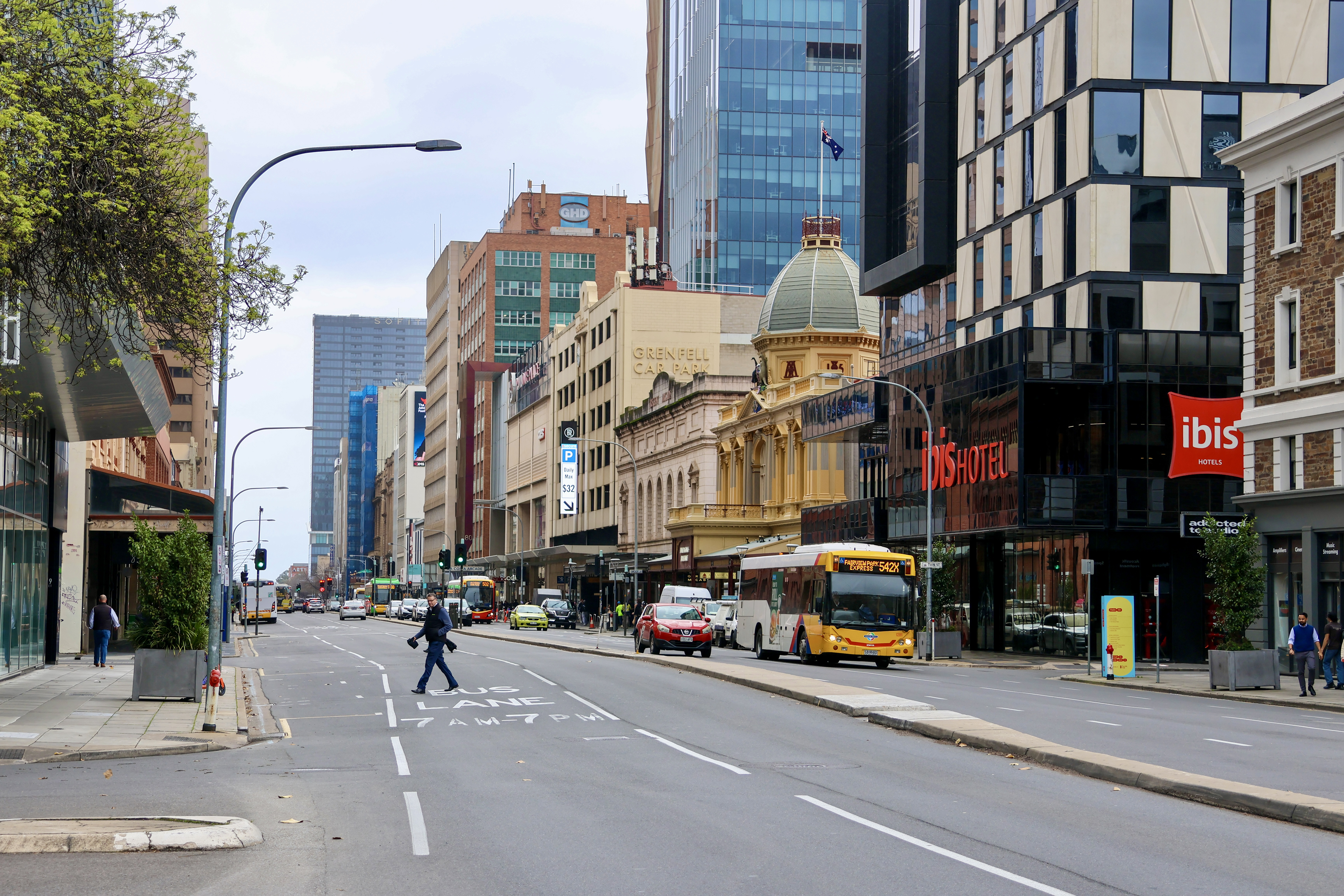
- Grenfell Street, looking west from Hindmarsh Square
- Coordinates: 34.924371°S 138.599638°E (West end); 34.923804°S 138.610991°E (East end)

General information
- Type: Street
- Location: Adelaide city centre
- Length: 1.0 km (0.6 mi)
- Opened: 1837

Major junctions
- West end: King William Street; Adelaide
- Hindmarsh Square; Pulteney Street; Frome Street
- East end: East Terrace; Adelaide

Location(s)
- LGA(s): City of Adelaide

Grenfell Street (34.924°S 138.602°E) is a major street in the north-east quarter of the Adelaide city centre, South Australia. The street runs west-east from King William Street to East Terrace. Its intersection with Pulteney Street is formed by Hindmarsh Square. On the west side of King William Street, it continues as Currie Street towards West Terrace.

== Naming ==
Grenfell Street was named after Pascoe St Leger Grenfell, a Cornish businessman and member of the South Australian Church Society. His significant donation of an acre of land on North Terrace was used for the construction of the Holy Trinity Church — one of the first churches built in the city. Grenfell also donated another 40 acres (16 ha) of country land for the use of the church as glebe lands. This land later became the suburb of Trinity Gardens.

== Description ==
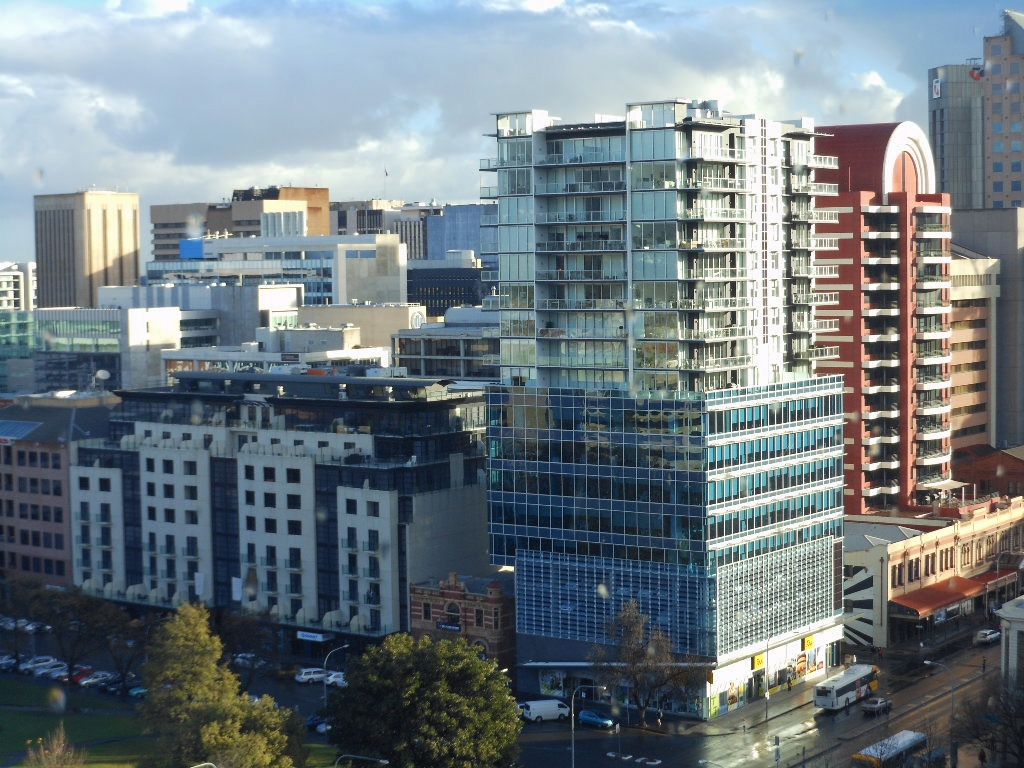
Corner Grenfell Street & Hindmarsh Square, looking SW

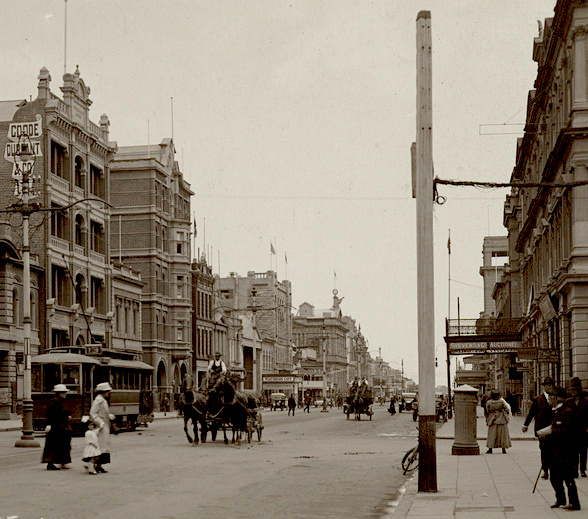
Grenfell Street, 1930s

Grenfell Street runs from King William Street to East Terrace. It is one of the intermediate-width streets of the Adelaide grid, at 1 1/2 chains (99 ft; 30 m) wide.

On the west side of King William Street, the western continuation of Grenfell Street is Currie Street, named after Raikes Currie, a member of the South Australian Association and South Australian Company.

The section of the street which runs parallel to Rundle Mall (west of Hindmarsh Square) on the northern side features many retail outlets, as well as the southern entrances of many of the arcades, side-streets, and eateries of the mall. The southern side is populated mainly by office buildings, including the Grenfell Centre ("the Black Stump") at no. 25.

A dedicated bus lane runs the whole length of both Grenfell and Currie Streets, limiting private vehicles to one lane for most of its length, and carrying nearly all bus traffic traversing the city in an east–west direction. At the eastern end of Grenfell, a dedicated bus track carries buses across East Terrace into the O-Bahn tunnel under Rymill Park.

The eastern end is occupied on the south side by the Tandanya National Aboriginal Cultural Institute, an art and cultural museum also used as a venue for the Adelaide Fringe and other events, and on the north side by the East End Markets redevelopment.

== Former buildings ==
=== Central Hall/Queen's Hall/Embassy Ballroom ===
Central Hall, at no. 102a Grenfell, was built by a Mrs Phillipson, of Glenelg, for the use of the Adelaide German Club (Allgemeiner Deutscher Verein) in 1894, opening in June of that year. It was subsequently used for a variety of community events (many unrelated to the club), for around 20 years. Charles Cawthorne took over the lease and reopened it Queen's Hall on 7 August 1915. Its use turned to performances, mainly concerts, operas, dramas, and fundraisers for World War I, and it also hosted occasional variety shows. Its use as a theatre diminished from 1923, and by 1929 it was operating as a dance hall. The building was partially destroyed by fire on 4 November 1929, and it fell into disuse until it was refurbished and reopened in 1933 as the Embassy Ballroom, which had an Art Deco facade. In the 1950s it was converted into a cinema, first called the Plaza Theatre and renamed Paris Cinema in 1965. It was later demolished and Regent Arcade built on the site.

== Heritage-listed buildings ==
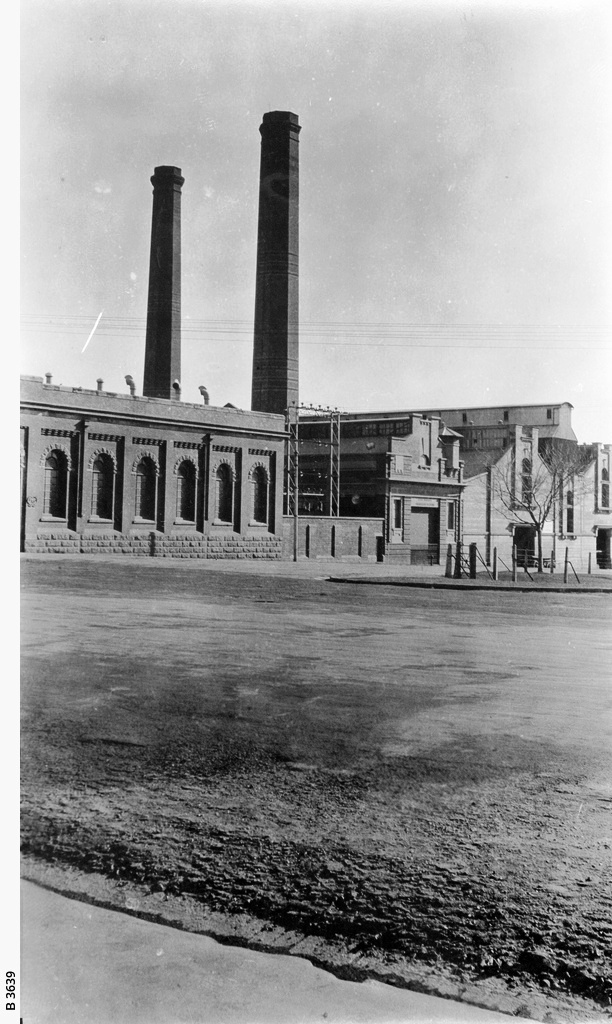
Adelaide Electric Supply Co. power station, East Tce, c.1926

=== Grenfell Street Power Station ===
On the corner of Grenfell Street and East Terrace there is the old Grenfell Street Power Station building. Much of the building now houses the Tandanya National Aboriginal Cultural Institute, facing Grenfell Street, which was heritage-listed on the SA Heritage Register in November 1984, while the old converter stations face East Terrace. A "Historic Engineering Plaque" is located on a ground level plinth just east of the north-east corner of the Tandanya building, which was dedicated by the Institution of Engineers, Australia, the Electricity Trust of South Australia and the Adelaide City Council on 6 April 1995.

=== Pubs ===
- The Producers Hotel (formerly Old Exchange Hotel, Producers Club Hotel, Woodman's Inn), at no. 233-235, was built on the site of the first pub built and licensed in the East End, the Woodman, in 1839. It was first licensed by John Ragless Jr, and so named because it was the first stop for timber merchants carting timber from "the Tiers" (as the Adelaide Hills were called). In 1900 it was renamed the Electric Light, after the power station. It was rebuilt for the South Australian Brewing Company in Queen Anne style in 1906 as the Producers. It was listed on the SA Heritage Register on 5 April 1984. After the East End markets moved away in 1986, the hotel became the East End Exchange Hotel for a short while before being renamed the Woodman's Inn in the mid-1990s. It became a major venue for live music of many genres, under its later name, the Producer's Bar, known simply as "The Producers". It also hosted Adelaide Fringe events, until its closure in 2018. It was functioning mainly as a nightclub in 2022, with a large knife fight reported in March of that year. In 2023 it was known as Friday's Lounge.
- The Griffins Hotel, built 1886, on the corner of Grenfell Street and Hindmarsh Square (address 40 Hindmarsh Square), is state heritage-listed.
- Crown and Anchor Hotel, cnr Grenfell/Union (built 1879; extensive alterations in 1929; local heritage-listing in 2001, facade only)

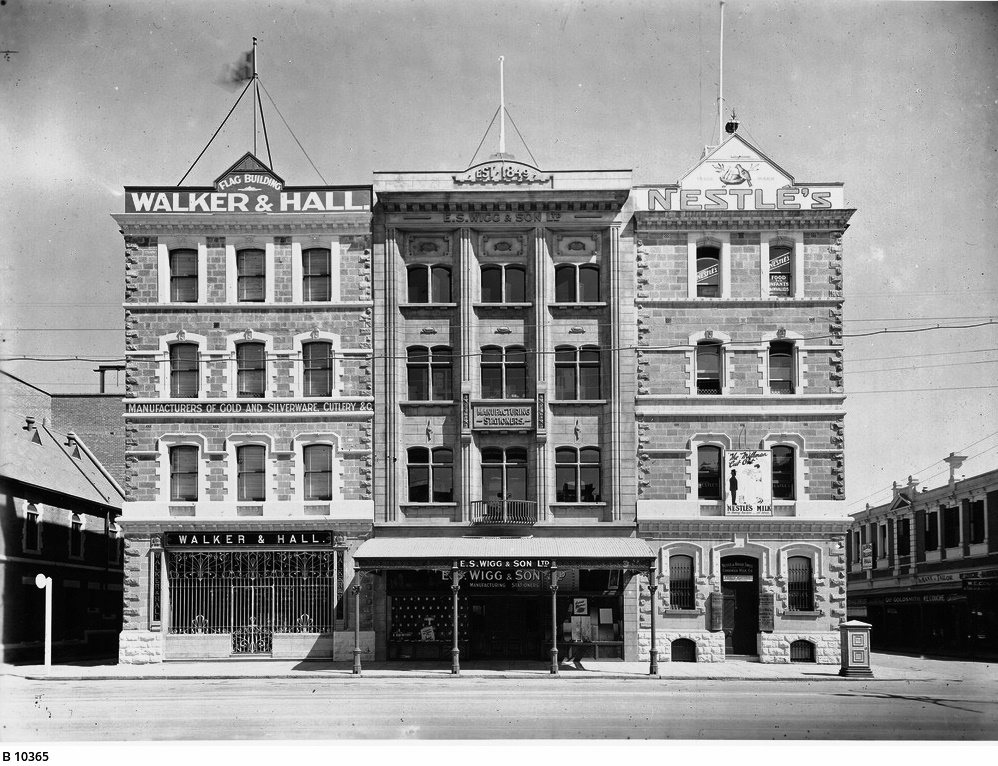
E. S. Wigg & Son stationers and adjoining buildings, 1922

=== Other historic buildings ===
Other state heritage-listed buildings in Grenfell Street include:

- Parts of the former Adelaide Fruit and Produce Exchange facing the street
- British & Foreign Bible Society office (Bertram Hall)
- Executor Trustee Office, no. 22
- Tattersalls Building, 10-14
- Ferrari House (former Eagle Star Insurance Building), 28-30
- Former Alliance Assurance Company Building, 18

Other local heritage-listed buildings include:

- Wiggs Building (former home of stationers E. S. Wigg & Son)
- Wyatt House, 113-119
- Warehouse, 121-127
- Hindmarsh Buildings, 134-140

== Transport changes ==
In July 2012, dedicated bus lanes were introduced along the full length of Grenfell Street in both directions, in operation from 7am to 7pm each weekday. When operational, taxis, cyclists and emergency vehicles are also able to use the lane, but private vehicles can only travel up to 100 metres (330 ft) in the bus lane.

In December 2016, after the O-Bahn extension tunnel was built underneath Rymill Park at the eastern end of the street, buses formerly routed along North Terrace were permanently routed along Grenfell (although they had been temporarily diverted from North Terrace via East Terrace, since construction of the Botanic Line of the Adelaide trams had begun in early October that year). After this, nearly all buses travelling in an east–west direction across the city use Grenfell.

== Junction list ==
Location	km	mi	Destinations	Notes
Adelaide city centre	0	0.0	King William Street	Continues as Currie Street
Adelaide city centre	0.2	0.12	Gawler Place	
Adelaide city centre	0.55	0.34	Pulteney Street	
Adelaide city centre	0.75	0.47	Frome Street	
Adelaide city centre	1.0	0.62	East Terrace	Continues as the bus-only O-Bahn Busway tunnel under the Adelaide Park Lands
Adelaide city centre	1.000 mi = 1.609 km; 1.000 km = 0.621 mi			
