= Rymill Park =

Park in Adelaide, South Australia

- Murlawirrapurka
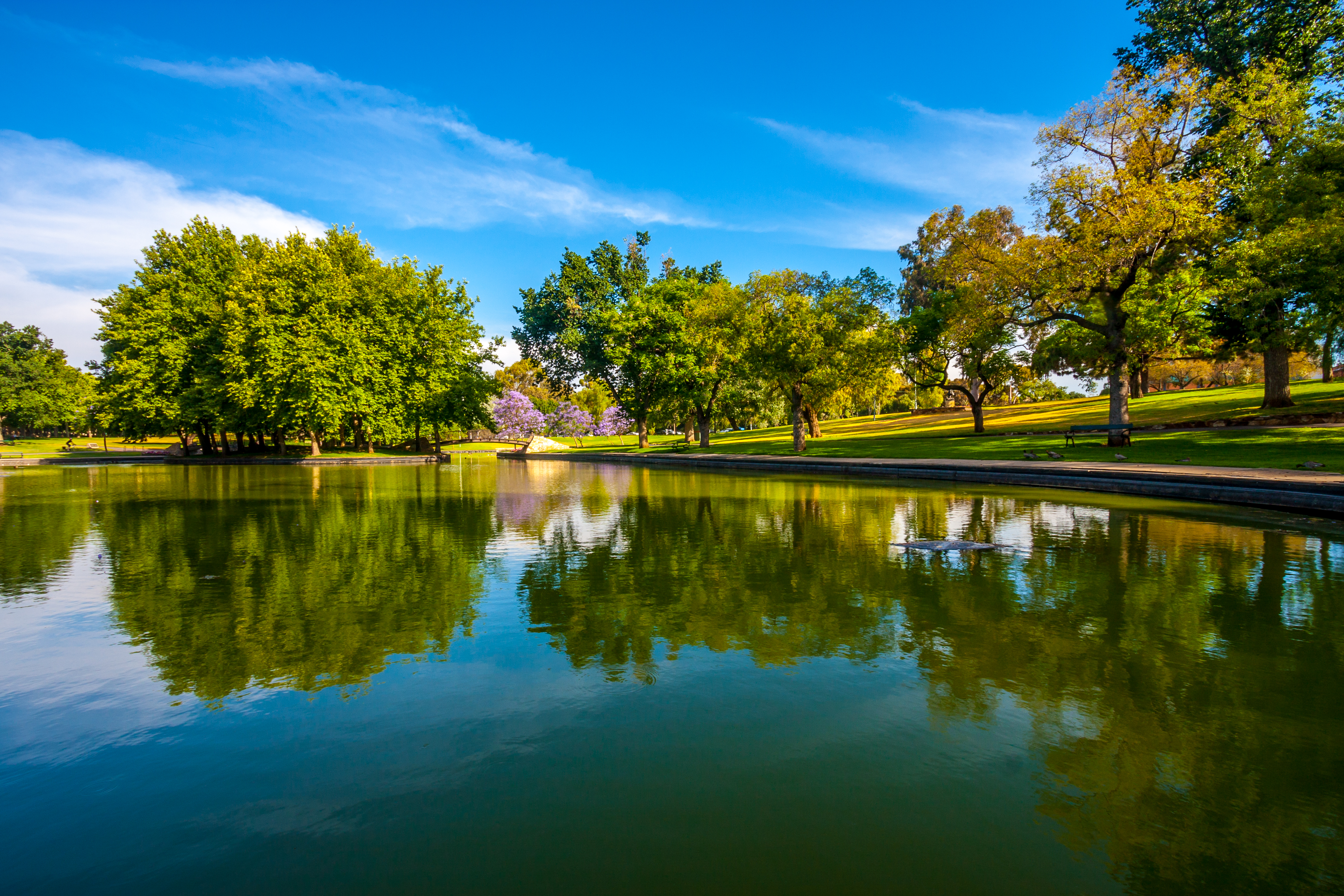
- Rymill Park in 2012

- Location within City of Adelaide
- Type: Urban park
- Location: Adelaide, South Australia, Australia
- Coordinates: 34.9238°S 138.6143°E
- Area: 14.5 ha (36 acres)
- Designer: William Pengilly; August Pelzer; William Veale
- Etymology: Arthur Rymill
- Operator: City of Adelaide
- Website: www.adelaide-parklands.asn.au/park-14

Rymill park paths, lake, rose gardens and picnic tables

Rymill Park / Murlawirrapurka (previously spelt Mullawirraburka), and numbered as Park 14, is a recreation park located in the East Park Lands of the South Australian capital of Adelaide. There is an artificial lake with rowboats for hire, a café, children's playground and rose garden, and the Adelaide Bowling Club is on the Dequetteville Terrace side. The O-Bahn passes underneath it, to emerge at the western side opposite Grenfell Street.

Before and in the early days of the colonisation of South Australia, the eastern park lands were used as camping grounds for the local Kaurna people and later people from other nearby Aboriginal peoples, such as the Ngarrindjeri.

The park underwent extensive redevelopment, including the construction of the lake, around 1959–1960. It has been used for many cultural and sporting events, in particular Adelaide Fringe, Feast and Festival of Arts events, Carnevale in Adelaide, the Adelaide International Horse Trials. The Fringe venue hub set up on the western side of the park is known as Gluttony.

== History ==
=== Early history of the area ===
Before European settlement, the eastern parklands were used by the Kaurna people, as a meeting and camping area. In the late 19th century, Poltpalingada Booboorowie, a personality well known among the European settlers as Tommy Walker, a Ngarrindjeri man, and other Aboriginal people sometimes referred to as the "fringe-dwellers" camped in the area. They were forced to move from the area, first to the Adelaide Botanic Garden area and then to Glenelg.

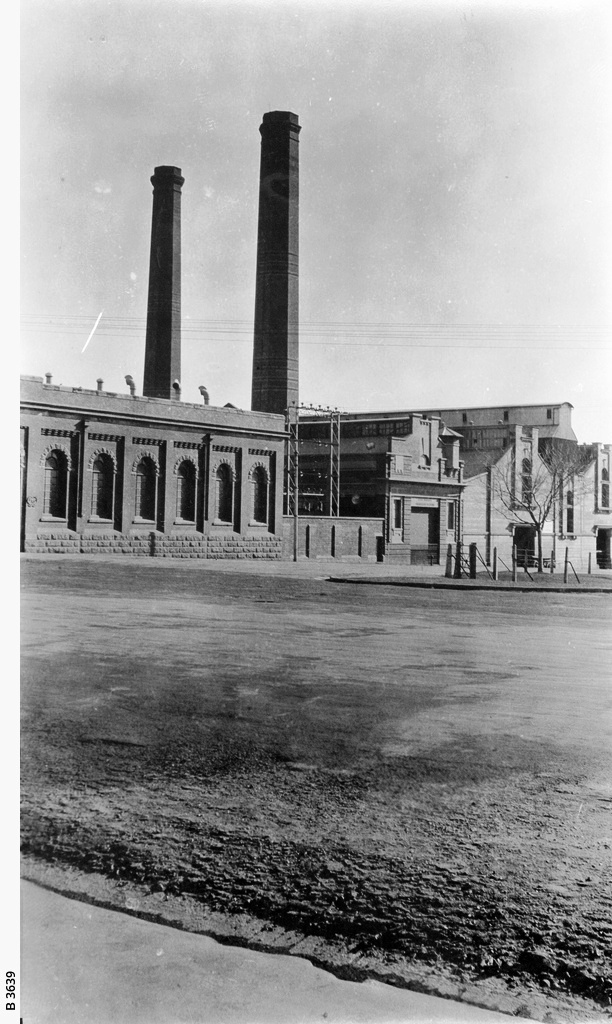
Adelaide Electric Supply Co. power station, East Tce, view from Rymill Park, c.1926

=== Creation of park (1960) ===
Keith Conlon described the area as "bare, swampy in winter, and populated by cows" from the time that Adelaide was founded and the parklands established by Colonel Light, and 120 years later.

The Adelaide Bowling Club moved to its present location, with its entrance off Dequetteville Terrace, in 1958.

In 1959–60, Adelaide City Council made many improvements to the park area. Following a tour overseas, Town Clerk William Veale suggested an artificial lake, playground and picnic area. The new facilities were opened by Lord Mayor Charles John Glover in late 1960. The park was named after Sir Arthur Rymill, Lord Mayor of Adelaide from 1950 to 1954 and council member for 23 years, who had actively supported the extension and improvement of Adelaide's parklands. The lake was constructed in 1959 and the rose gardens were created in the 1960s by excavating what was then the Bartels Road rubbish tip.

=== Dual naming (2003) ===
Following the Council's Reconciliation Vision Statement in 1997, it set about applying dual naming of many city sites and features, deciding on a Kaurna name in collaboration with appropriate authorities and community organisations. In 2003 the final group of names were endorsed, and the name Mullawirraburka was applied to Rymill Park. The spelling was later revised to Murlawirrapurka, as a more correct transcription of Kaurna. The name Murlawirrapurka was the name of a Kaurna man, known to settlers as "King John", "King Jack", or "Onkaparinga Jack". His name was derived from Kaurna words (old spelling) mulla − dry and wirra – forest, which together made the name of Mullawirra, the "territory" in the Aldinga-Willunga area which Murlawirrapurka inherited from his father, and burka – "elder". He was one of three elders well known to the colonists (along with Kadlitpina and Ityamai-itpina), and more is known about him than any other Kaurna person of that time.

=== Lake repair (2008) ===
After being drained in November 2007 to make repairs addressing the leaking of 200,000 litres (53,000 US gal) per week, the lake was refilled in September 2008.

=== O-Bahn extension (2015−17) ===
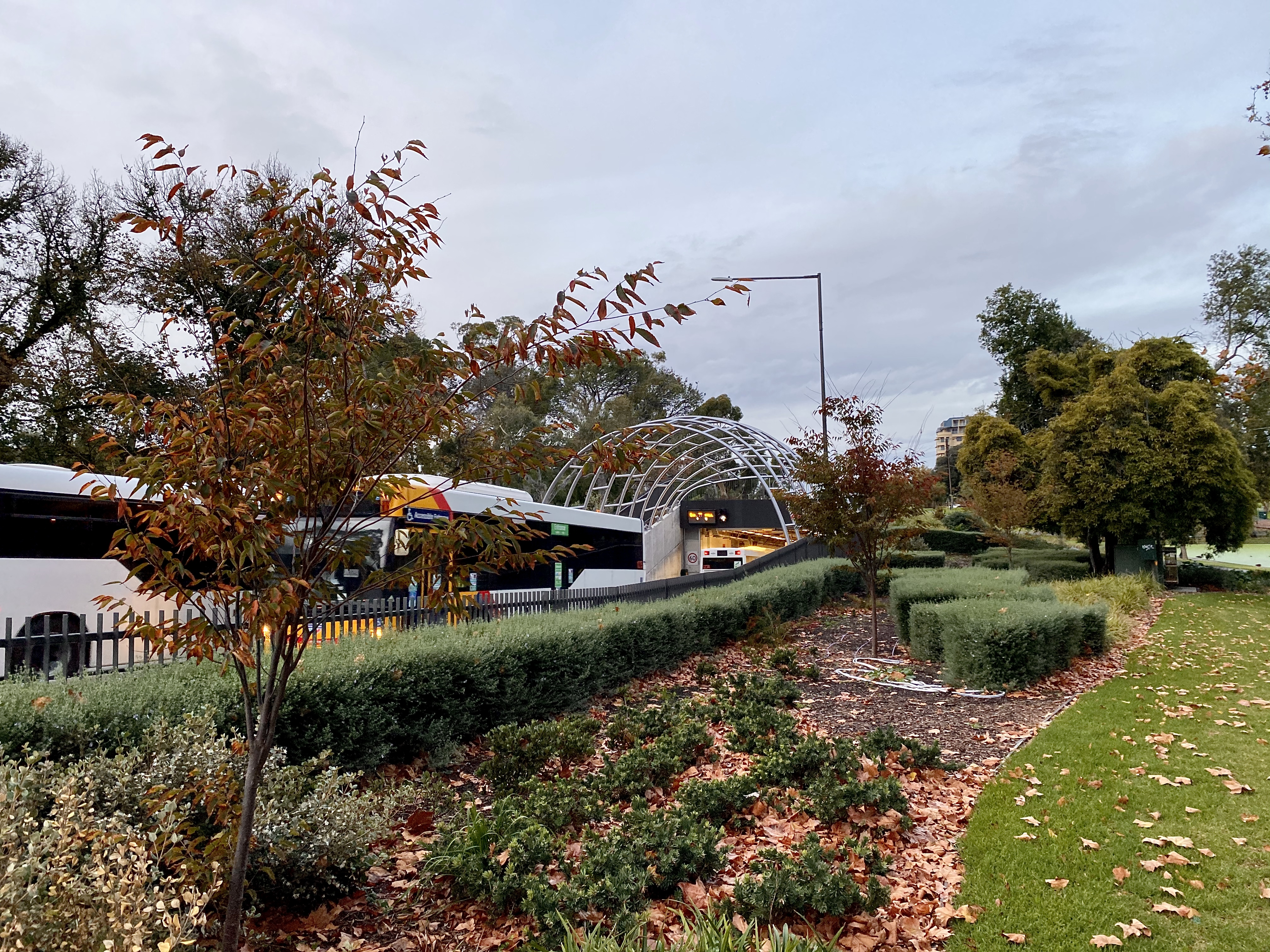
The entrance to the O-Bahn Busway tunnel, which passes under Rymill Park

In 2015, a plan to realign Rundle Street as part of a plan to extend O-Bahn bus services to and from the city of Adelaide created controversy. The plan would result in the removal of numerous long established regulated and significant trees. Critics of the plan included Mark Parnell MLC, Nick Xenophon and former Australian Democrats leader, Ian Gilfillan. Public objections to the redevelopment prompted the creation of the Rymill Park Alliance and the Save Adelaide's Rymill Park campaign and Facebook page.

However, construction went ahead and was completed in 2017 December. Rymill Park and nearby Rundle Park / Kadlitpina was closed and a tunnel was built underneath them.

=== New master plans (2019–20) ===
In late 2019, the Council published a draft Master Plan and Community Land Management Plan (CLMP), inviting comment from the community both online and at a public meeting on 8 December.

=== Lake upgrade (2023–24) ===
The lake underwent a major upgrade costing A$6 million, from August 2023 until its reopening in April 2024. The changes make it more environmentally friendly, and includes a new pipeline connecting it to the Victoria Park / Pakapakanthi that will supply most of its water. This makes it more cost-effective for the Adelaide City Council, which was previously spending A$160,000 a year topping up the water and replacing it after outbreaks of algae.

== Location, facilities, use ==
The park is bordered by East Terrace, Dequetteville Terrace, and Rundle and Bartels Roads. It is in close proximity to the Adelaide Botanic Garden, Hutt Street, Rundle Park, and Victoria Park.

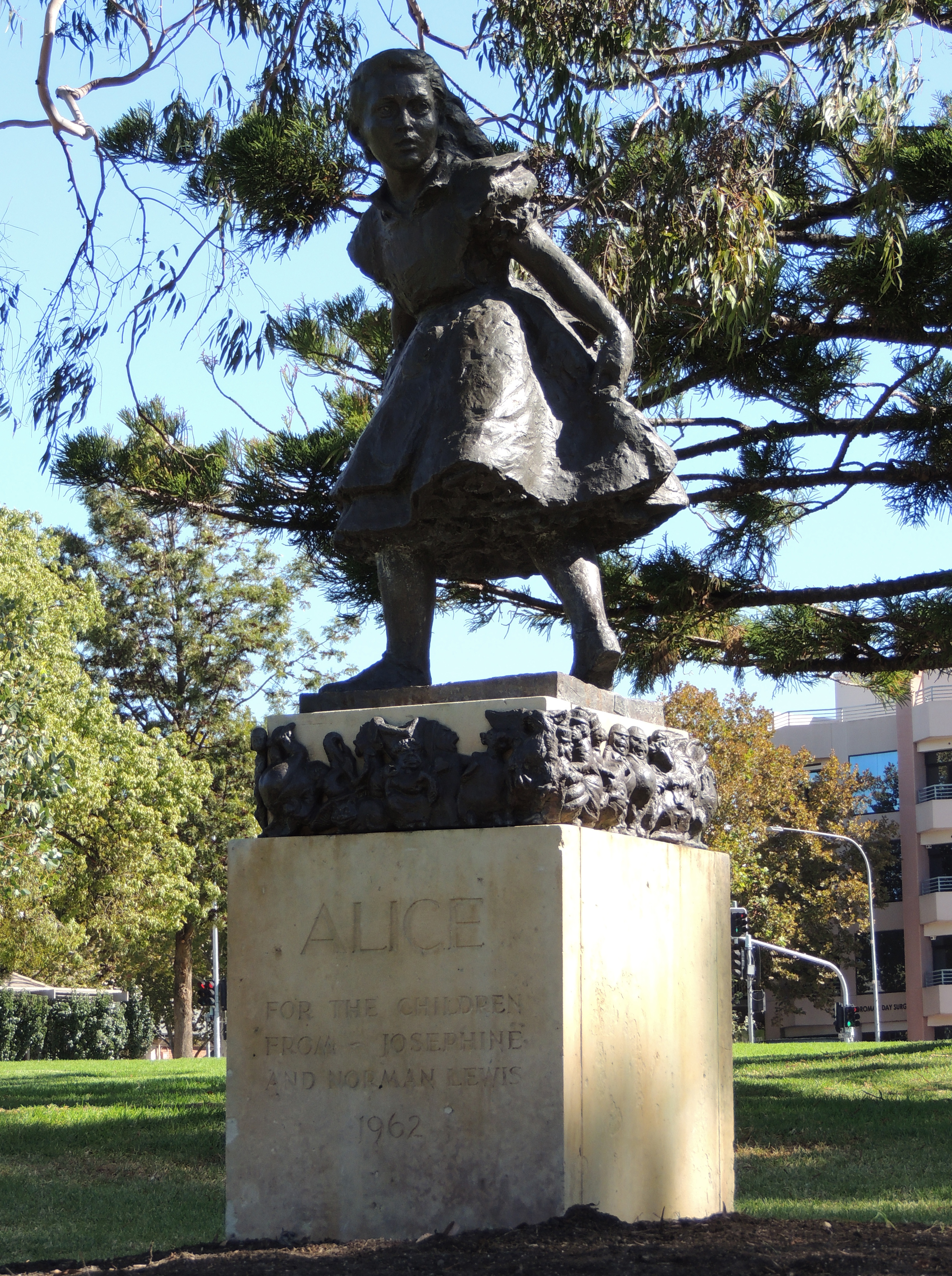
Alice statue by John Dowie, 1962

A shallow artificial lake was built in the park in 1960. Rowboats have been available for hire at the park's kiosk, exclusively for use on the lake. The lake underwent renovations from August 2023, and reopened in April 2024.

Adelaide businessman Arnie Rossis ran the kiosk from 1998 until 2013, when it was taken over by his daughter and son-in-law until they closed it in 2018. Various "pop-up" caterers used the space since, until "Loch & Quay" leased it for the 2018/2019 season, but as of April 2024, the kiosk has not reopened. Negotiations are under way for the owner of Peter Rabbit, a cafe in Hindley Street, to rebuild and run the kiosk. Construction has yet to be approved by parliament, but it is hoped that works would be able to be started in spring 2024.

Other features of the park include rose gardens, playgrounds, avenues of well-established trees, barbecue facilities, and the 1962 statue Alice by John Dowie, inspired by Lewis Carroll's stories for children. Dowie's "Piccanniny" drinking fountain, in the form of an Aboriginal child and made out of coloured concrete with a bronze water container, is near the playground.

The park has been a site for many cultural and sporting events including Carnevale in Adelaide, the Adelaide Equestrian Festival, Aerobic Challenge, and various events in the Adelaide Festival, Adelaide Fringe and Feast festivals. The Fringe location in Rymill Park is known as "Gluttony".

== Flora and fauna ==
Many of the park's larger trees provide hollows and roosts which are utilised by various species for nesting and residence. Native birds species commonly seen in the park include crested pigeons, magpies, magpie-larks, eastern rosellas, rainbow lorikeets, Australian white ibis and various species of duck. Ducks are present year-round at the artificial lake which provides a permanent water source. Pacific black ducks and Australian wood ducks are the most commonly sighted species.

Marsupials such as the brushtail possum rest in tree hollows by day and emerge at night to forage and feed.

== See also ==
- List of Adelaide parks and gardens
