= Hornibrook =

Hornibrook, or Hornabook, is an English surname. Notable people with the surname include:

== Hornabrook ==
- Beta Hornabrook née Mary Elizabeth Cocking (c. 1881–?), sat for Birmingham Deritend (UK Parliament constituency) in 1929
- Charles Atkins Hornabrook (c. 1833–1903), hotelier in colonial South Australia
- Charles Soward Hornabrook (1859–1922), Anglican priest in South Australia
- Judith Hornabrook (1928–2011), Chief Archivist of New Zealand
- Rupert Walter Hornabrook (1871–1951), Australian medical doctor and specialist anaesthetist

== Hornibrook ==
- Alex Hornibrook (born 1997), American football quarterback
- F. A. Hornibrook (1878–1965), Irish physcial culturalist and writer
- Isabel Hornibrook (1859–1952), Irish-born American children's literature writer
- Manuel Hornibrook (1893–1970), Australian civil engineer
- Percy Hornibrook (1899–1976), Australian cricketer
- Selina Hornibrook (born 1978), Australian netball player
- William H. Hornibrook (1884–1946), US diplomat

== See also ==
- Hornbrook (surname)
- Hornibrook Bridge, toll bridge of Brisbane, Australia (demolished)
- Hornibrook Bus Lines, a bus operator of Brisbane, Australia
