= Hornbrook (surname) =

Hornbrook is a surname. Notable people with the surname include:

- Alfred Hornbrook, New Zealand settler at Mount Pleasant in 1849
- Bruce Hornbrook Sage (1909–1983), American chemical engineer and lecturer
- Chris Hornbrook, American musician, founding member of metalcore band Poison the Well
- Hester Hornbrook, co-founder of the Melbourne City Mission in 1854
- James Joseph Hornbrook (1868–1942), American brigadier general during World War I
- Olive MacFarland (née Hornbrook; 1872–1962), American artist and illustrator
- Rebecca Hornbrook (born 1975), Canadian atmospheric chemist
- Thomas Hornbrook, whose name was the source of the former name of Wheeling Park, a park in Wheeling, West Virginia, U.S.
- Thomas Lyde Hornbrook (1807–1855), British marine artist

== Fictional characters ==
- Cathi Hornbrook, in A Dream of Kings (novel), American novel published in 1955

== See also ==
- Hornbrook, California, a place in the United States
- Hornbrook Formation, a geological formation in California, U.S.
- Hornbrook's Park, now Wheeling Park
- Hornibrook, a surname
