= New Zealand Volunteer Sisterhood =

Women's organisation in World War I

The New Zealand Volunteer Sisterhood (NZVS) was a volunteer nursing group established in 1915 by Ettie Annie Rout. The group was founded on Rout's core missions of public and sexual health.

While this work was celebrated in France, the Sisterhood was controversial and the New Zealand Government condemned Rout's sexual health advocacy, banning newspapers from mentioning her name.

== World War I ==
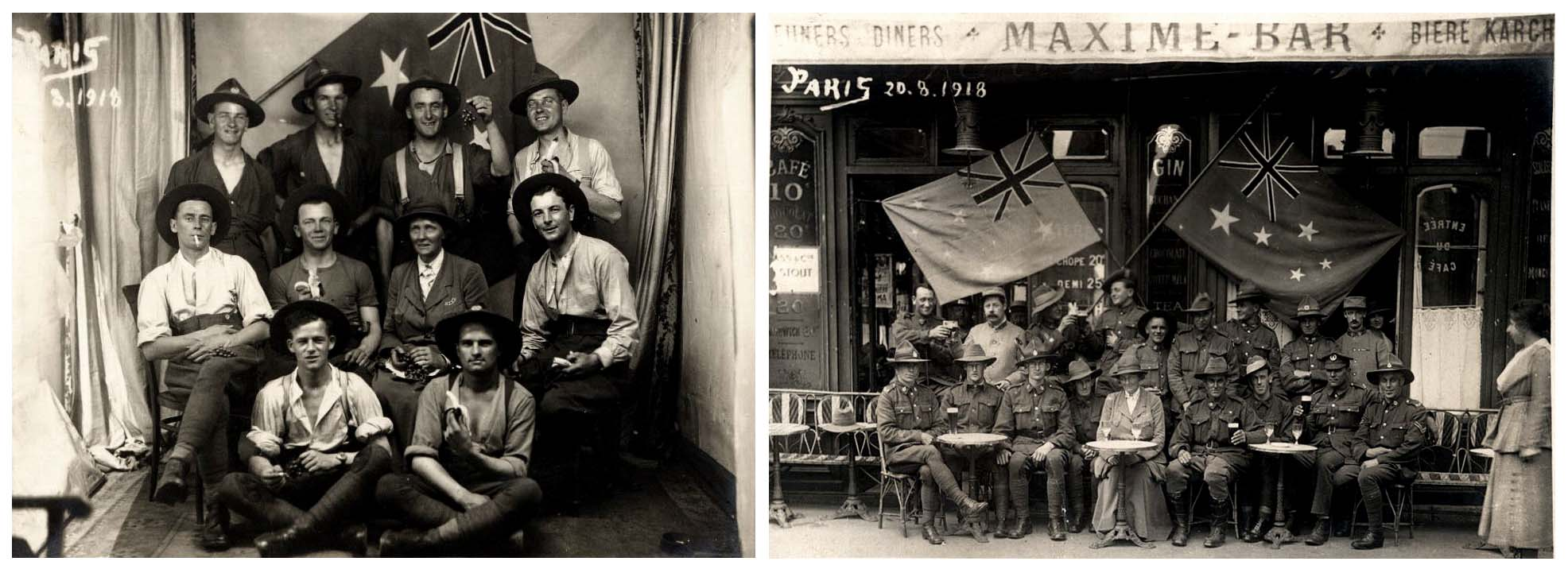
Ettie Rout with NZEF Infantrymen. Archives New Zealand. 2 September 2013, 15:10

In 1915 Rout and 39 other women arrived at Trentham Camp in Upper Hutt, Wellington. This decision was met with protest from military authorities and the organisation did not receive official status, despite Rout's contentious claims that their work was endorsed by the Minister of Defence.

In the face of this resistance, the New Zealand Volunteer Sisterhood's first contingent of 12 volunteers embarked for Cairo on 21 October 1915. Upon arrival in Cairo, most of the women found employment at a YMCA canteen at the Esbekia Gardens, which were a popular spot for soldiers to engage in solicitation.

Rout stayed in Christchurch in an attempt to find additional volunteers and raise funds for the sisterhood. She arrived in Egypt in February 1916 with the NZVS second contingent and was immediately made aware of the prevalence of sexually transmitted diseases amongst New Zealand troops. Rout treated this as a medical issue which required treatment through prophylactics and regulated brothels but due to taboos and social stigmas her suggestions were refused by the New Zealand Medical Corps officers.

In April 1916 the New Zealand Division arrived in France and the leading officer General G.S. Richardson reported on the seriousness of the problem of venereal diseases. Despite Richardson's efforts, New Zealand Prime Minister Massey refused to raise the issue in government. Soon sexually transmitted diseases caused nearly 500,000 hospital admissions among Commonwealth troops. Gonorrhea was among the most impactful, often acutely disabling personnel and requiring a lengthy recovery period.

Although the majority of the New Zealand Expeditionary Force had left for France, Rout remained in the Middle East to establish the Tel El Kebir Soldiers' Club and, later, a canteen at El Qantara. These spaces aimed to provide recreation and rest facilities for Australasian soldiers fighting in Sinai and Palestine.

These facilities were well received by service personnel, Rout and another NZVS worker, Miss M. Higgins, were mentioned in dispatches and on 18 January 1917 Rout featured in an article in the Christchurch Star which quoted a letter from an Australian soldier who described Rout as "a second Florence Nightingale".

Despite refusal from the New Zealand Medical Corps and continued pressure to cease her efforts, Rout persisted in trying to treat venereal disease and travelled to London to progress her cause. In London she collaborated with prominent doctors to design her own prophylactic kit. The kits were sold to the New Zealand Medical Soldiers Club near the New Zealand Convalescent Hospital in Hornchurch.

By the end of 1917 the New Zealand military finally adopted her safe sex kit for compulsory distribution.

== Censorship ==
Rout's opinions regarding contraception were considered widely controversial and this was only heightened when she refused to denigrate prostitutes, instead stating that "in the nature of things we war-workers can give only social values to our men; the 'other women' give more". The War Cabinet soon made it an offence punishable by a £100 fine, to publish Ettie Rout's name.

These prohibitions were still in place nearly a year after the end of World War I and, in 1922, her book on safe sex titled Safe Marriage: A Return to Sanity was banned in New Zealand despite being a best seller in the United Kingdom. One British cleric labelled Rout as "the wickedest woman in Britain".

== Later life and legacy ==
Following the publication of Safe Marriage: A Return to Sanity, Rout wrote a vegetarian cookbook and a book about Māori culture called Māori Symbolism.

In 1936 Rout died of a quinine overdose in the Pacific after having sent out telegrams saying "Ettie died at sea".

An AIDS clinic was established in Rout's honour in 1988 in Christchurch, called the Ettie Rout Clinic and later the Ettie Rout Centre. There is also a plaque in her honour in Victoria Square.

== See also ==
- Fanny McHugh – Midwife, volunteer nurse, health patrol, social hygiene lecturer
