= Foy & Gibson =

Former Australian department store

Foy & Gibson Pty Ltd
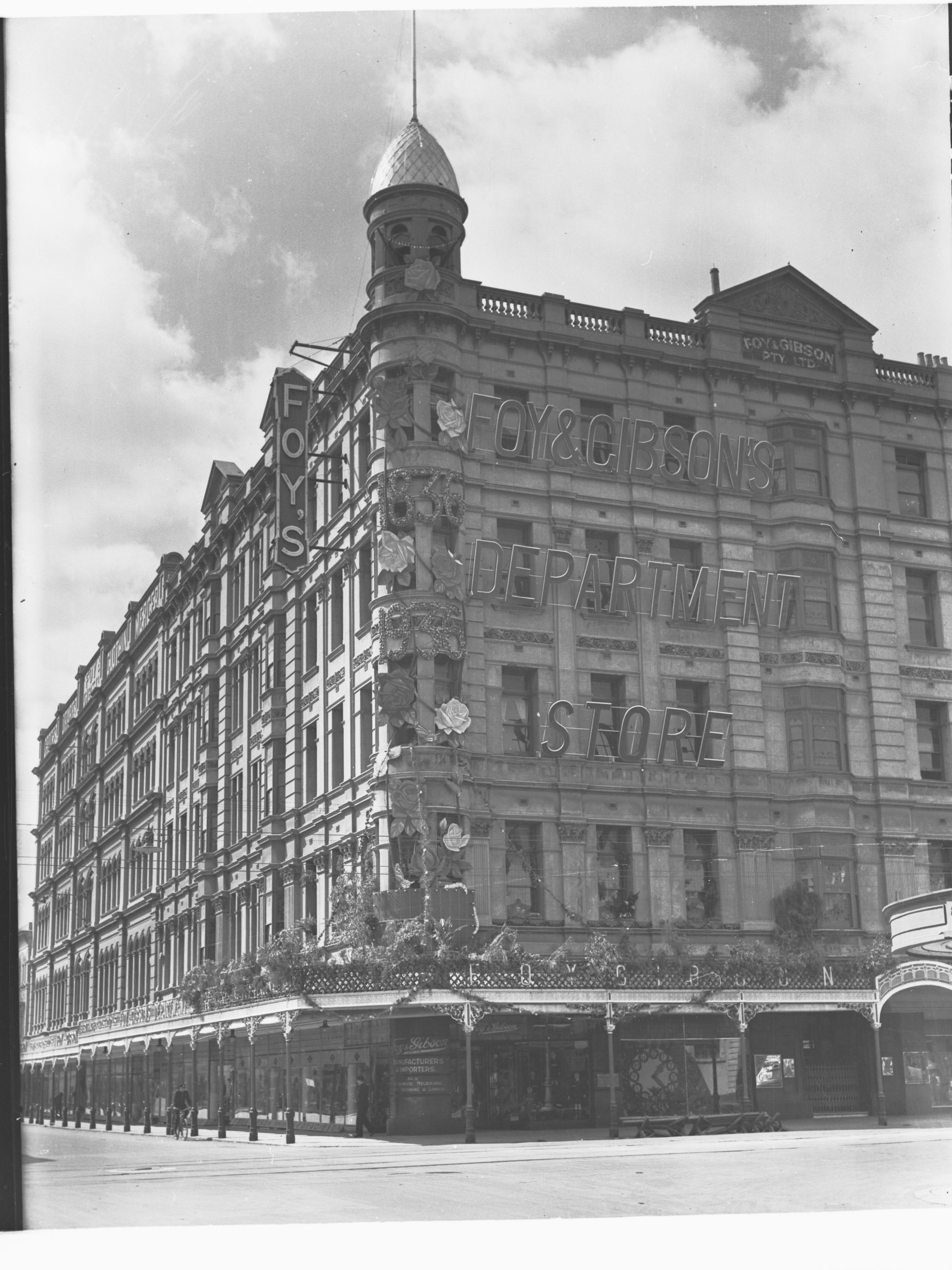
- Former Foy & Gibson department store on Rundle Street, Adelaide in 1936
- Type: Department store
- Industry: Retail
- Founded: 1883; 143 years ago Collingwood, Victoria, Australia
- Founder: Mark Foy; Francis Foy; William Gibson
- Defunct: 1960s-1970s
- Headquarters: Melbourne, Victoria, Australia
- Products: Clothing, manchester, leather goods, soft furnishings, furniture, hardware, food

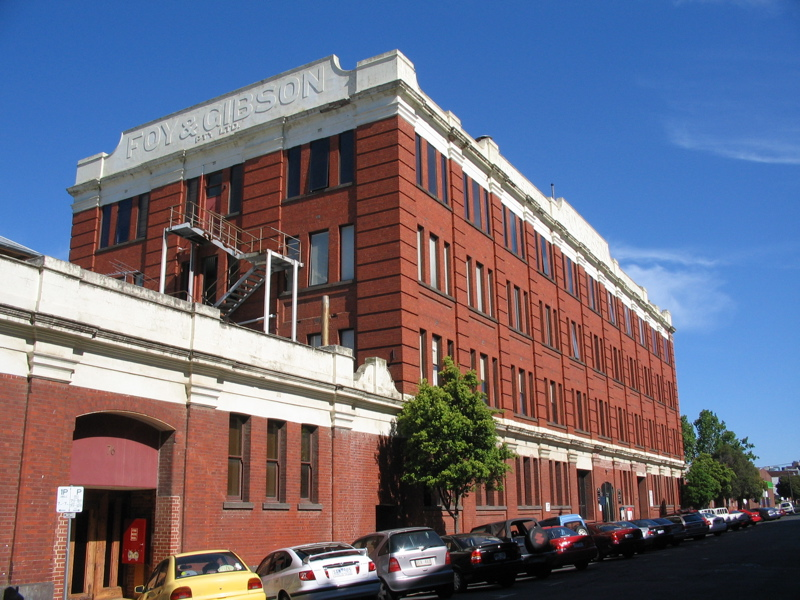
Former warehouses and factories built for the company in Oxford Street, Collingwood

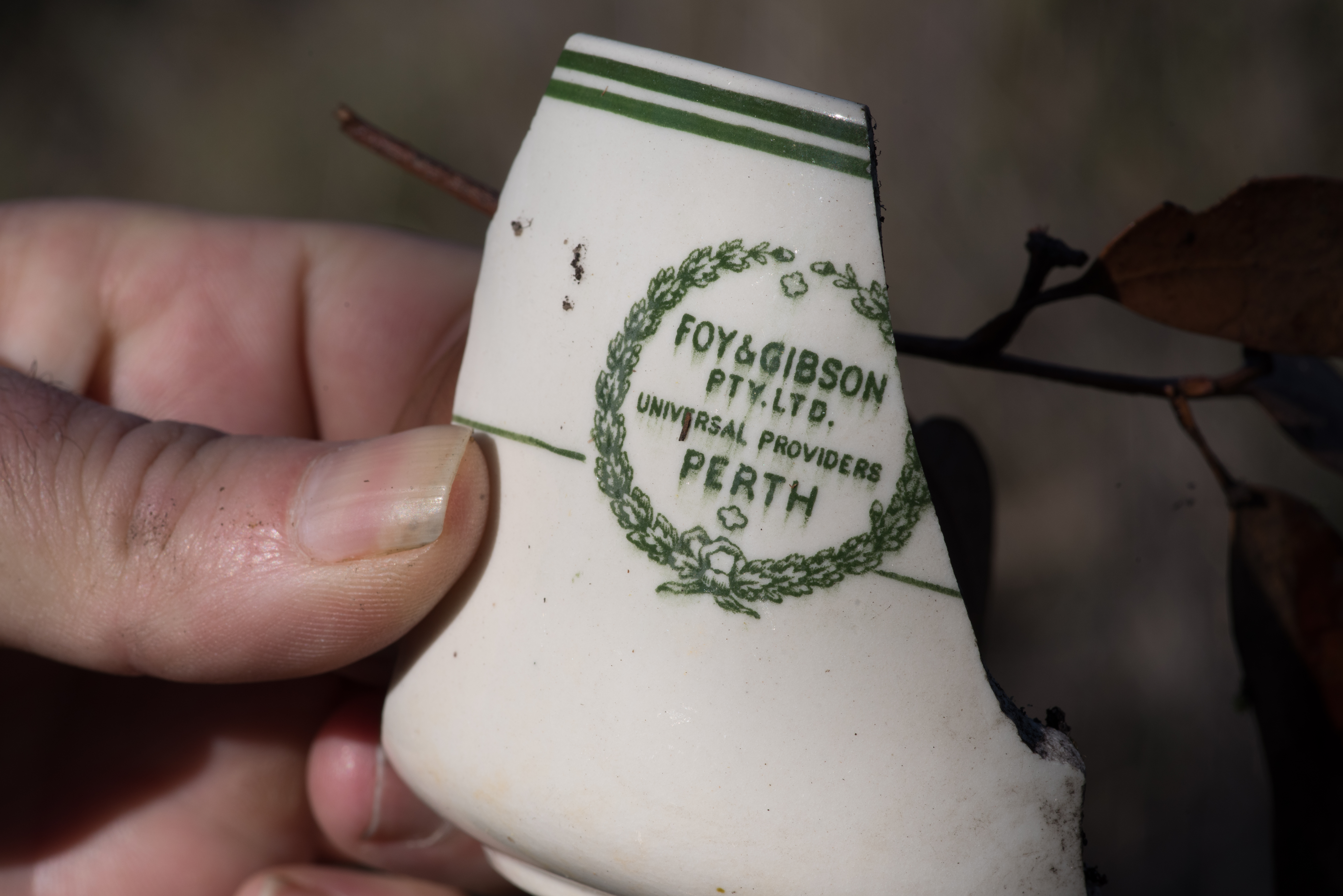
broken cup from Foy & Gibson, Perth

Foy & Gibson, also known as Foy's and later Cox-Foys, was one of Australia's largest and earliest department store chains. A large range of goods were manufactured and sold by the company including clothing, manchester, leather goods, soft furnishings, furniture, hardware and food.

== History ==
The first store was established as a drapery in Smith Street, Collingwood, Victoria by Mark Foy. This business prospered, occupying three shops by 1875 and six by 1880. Ownership was transferred to his son Francis Foy in partnership with William Gibson in March 1883, but very soon after Francis Foy sold his half share to Gibson and moved to Sydney with his brother Mark, establishing Mark Foy's there in 1885.

When the business expanded in the late 1880s, Gibson was joined by William Dougal and by his nephews Samuel Gibson and John Maclellan. He opened a hardware department and then rearranged the store in 1889, reputedly modelled on the Parisian Bon Marché, creating what is said to be the first department store in Melbourne. Gibson kept his store going despite the 1893 bank crashes through hard work and 'dogged determination', and began to establish his own manufacturing works. By the early 20th century Gibson's workshops produced men's clothing, shirts, ladies' underclothing, millinery, furniture, bedding and hardware, and 'Gibsonia' woollens and hosiery. The complex and the stores became one of the largest employers in Victoria, and dominated the Wellington and Smith streets area with huge red brick multi-level buildings, all designed by architect William Pitt.

Gibson established a branch of the business in Perth in 1895, and subsequently opened a store in Brisbane in 1903 and another in Rundle Street, Adelaide (now Rundle Mall) in 1907, on the site of the York Hotel, becoming the first department store with many interstate branches. A second Melbourne store called the Big Store, opened in Chapel Street, Prahran, in 1902, and in 1935 the Melbourne city store on the corner of Bourke and Swanston streets was rebuilt.

In 1955 the company was bought out by Cox Brothers. In 1964 Foy & Gibson (WA) Ltd, including ten stores in Western Australia, was sold to David Jones. The Bourke Street, Melbourne store was sold to Woolworths in 1967. The Bourke Street store still stands but had been modernised, with three-storeys added at some point.

A building owned by Charles Atkins Hornabrook on the corner of Rundle and Pulteney Streets was demolished by Foy & Gibson in 1909 to make way for the Grand Central Hotel, a hotel of six storeys built in the style of their emporium next door. However, despite some high-profile guests (the Prince of Wales in 1920, Arthur Conan Doyle in 1922), it never prospered, and around 1925 was incorporated into the emporium. It later became showrooms and offices for the Electricity Trust, then in 1975–1976 was demolished to make way for a multi-level car park. Since demolition in 1976 and as of 2023 the Rundle Street site is occupied by the multi-storey car park and a Hungry Jack's fast food restaurant.

The site of the Adelaide store in what is now Rundle Mall now hosts multiple tenancies. Cox brothers went into receivership in 1968 ending the name of Foys in Melbourne. Letter books, financial records and catalogues are held by the University of Melbourne Archives.

== Origins ==
By 1868 Mark Foy had established a drapery store in the Victorian gold mining town of Bendigo finding this town too small to develop and expand his business he hired several wagons and moved his business to Melbourne. He chose a place in Collingwood and set up his business in a building at the rear of the property. In 1931 the little house in Collingwood in which Foy started his business was still part of the entrance to Foy & Gibson Emporium.
