= George Klewitz Soward =

Australian architect and politician

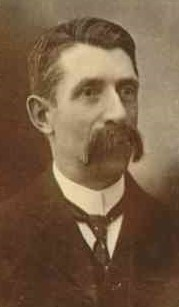
Formal portrait of G.K. Soward, 1902

George Klewitz Soward (27 August 1857 – 21 February 1941) was an architect and politician in South Australia. he was a partner in the firm English & Soward from 1880 to 1925, renamed English, Soward & Jackman from 1926 to 1936. Among other buildings, the firm was known for designing Beehive Corner, the Epworth Building, and the Queen Adelaide Club.

== Early life and education ==
Soward's father, George Soward ( – 1894) migrated to the colony of South Australia aboard Lady Emma, arriving in October 1838. His wife Eliza Maria, née Maloney (c. February 1816 – 30 May 1855) and their daughter Eliza Maria Soward (c. 1838 – 26 January 1901) arrived in December 1838 aboard the same Lady Emma from Launceston; they may have broken their journey in Tasmania. The couple had six children in total. George Soward Snr married again, on 24 June 1856 to Bertha Klewitz (?–1870); they had one son, George Klewitz Soward, born 27 August 1857 in Norwood, and two daughters: Bertha in 1859 and Emma Klewitz Soward in 1862. He married one more time, on 5 February 1873, to Eliza Deans (died 3 October 1875).

George Soward Snr was a timber merchant, ironmonger, Clerk of Works (1856) in the Colonial Architect's Department, and then Supervisor (1860) of Public Works. After Edward Hamilton's resignation in 1860, Soward was acting Colonial Architect for six months.

Soward was educated at St Peter's College from 1867 to around 1874. There, in 1872, he won the Prankerd Scholarship for the study of a foreign language.

== Career as an architect ==
Soward served his articles as an architect with architect Thomas English from 1877, then was taken on as his partner in the firm of English and Soward around 1880. The practice continued under this name after the death of Thomas English in 1884, with his son Joseph English (died 1927).

Herbert Montefiore Jackman (1897–1968) joined the practice from 1926 to 1936, with the practice known as English, Soward & Jackman.

Soward was architect to the South Australian Jockey Club, and designed several grandstands, including one at Adelaide Oval.

His architectural work, much of it in partnership with English and his son, includes a number of buildings that are now heritage-listed, including Beehive Corner and The Griffins Hotel in Hindmarsh Square.

== Political career ==
Soward had long experience as a councillor with the Glenelg Town Council, and served as mayor from 1896 to 1898.

He was a member of the South Australian House of Assembly for Torrens from 3 May 1902 to 26 May 1905.

== Family ==
Soward's half-sister Eliza Maria Soward married C. A. Hornabrook on 18 March 1857.

Soward married Emmy Lucy Charlotte Beare on 7 April 1880 at St Barnabas Church in Clare. They had two daughters, Helen Daisy and Marjorie, and a son, Lewis Douglas. The family lived at 62 The Mall (now Moseley Street) in Glenelg.

== Other roles and activities ==
Soward was an inaugural member of the South Australian Institute of Architects in 1886, resigning for a while after discovering that Joseph English (not a member of SAIA), was charging former clients of his father less than that recommended by the body. He later became a fellow, but he was apparently not a popular member owing to his "forceful views".

Soward was a director of the Glenelg Railway Company and the City Permanent Building Society, and was a prominent member of the Council of the National Defence League.

He also wrote several works, including a novel called The Mirthful Mutineer, which was published in the Australian Woman's Mirror, a Sydney magazine. Maintaining a strong interest in history, his article "One Hundred Years of Building" was published in South Australian Homes and Gardens in 1936.

== Notable buildings ==
Notable buildings designed by Soward, many of which are heritage-listed, include:

- Adelaide Oval Grandstand addition (1889)
- Beehive Corner
- Epworth Building
- Glenelg Oval Grandstand
- Grandstand at Morphettville Racecourse
- Queen Adelaide Club
- University of Adelaide Sports Pavilion on War Memorial Drive
- St Corantyn, originally "Eöthen", residence for Charles and Eliza Hornabrook

== Death and legacy ==
Soward died on 21 February 1941. He was buried at St Jude's Anglican Church in Brighton.
