= Beehive Corner =

Street corner in Adelaide, Australia

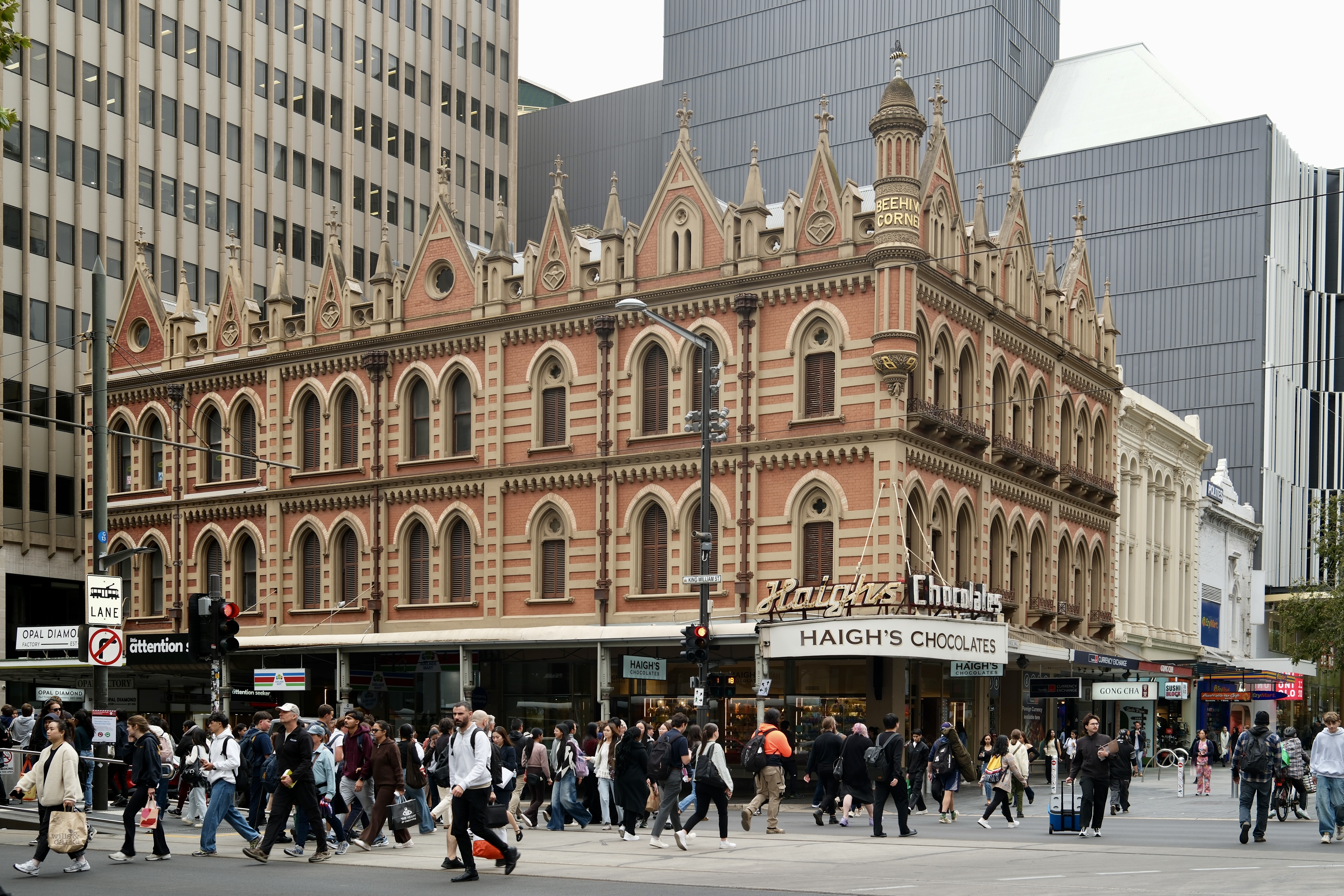
- Front view of Beehive Corner, 2026
- Interactive map of the Beehive Corner area

General information
- Type: Commercial
- Location: 32–40 King William Street, Adelaide, Australia
- Coordinates: 34.922857°S 138.599764°E
- Year built: 1895–1896
- Owner: Government of South Australia

Design and construction
- Architect: George Klewitz Soward

South Australian Heritage Register
- Official name: Beehive Corner Building
- Designated: 5 April 1984
- Reference no.: 11702

The Beehive Corner is a landmark in the Adelaide city centre, on the north-eastern corner of King William Street and Rundle Mall, centrally placed between the railway station and the city's shopping precinct. Built in 1895-6, Haigh's Chocolates has occupied the Gothic revival building since 1923, and the building was state-heritage listed on the SA Heritage Register in 1984.

== History ==
The name gained currency from "The Beehive", a draper's shop opened by Brewer and Robertson from October 1849; the name was chosen to suggest busy trade. It was owned by J.V.B. Ryley from 1850 to 1858, (Note: John Venables Ball Ryley and William Moore were in partnership.) followed by Israel Simmons (d. 9 June 1893) who ran the shop until 1886, when his business, with many others, failed. Nearby tenants included well-known architect Edmund Wright; William Ekins the gunsmith; and James Allen's printing shop.

It had been a well-known landmark for 50 years in 1895 when what is essentially the present "Beehive Buildings" were built for the owner, Henry Martin, to replace the antiquated structure. In the new design by George Klewitz Soward, four shops had frontages on King William Street and three facing Rundle Street, each 8 feet (2.4 m) high, with jarrah floors and plastered walls and rear access and one shop 14 ft (4.3 m) high, all having large plate-glass windows and nickel-plated columns. It was built three storeys above the pavement, and was Gothic in character, each gable finishing with crockets and a finial, and with open balustrades between them. At the main angle an ornamental turret was corbelled out, surmounted by a gilded beehive and bee and on the shaft of the turret the words "Beehive Corner 1895" among foliage. The piers dividing the shopfronts were of Palmer granite. Sliding shutters were fitted to the windows facing King William Street, with a handsome iron verandah made by Fulton & Co. The sills of the windows facing Rundle Street were fitted with a small iron railing. The architects were English & Soward. The decorative Gothic Revival style was unusual for its time, being most often associated with churches. The new building opened in 1896.

In the early 1900s, the German-trained chocolatier Carl Stratmann opened his business in the building. Owing to anti-German sentiment during World War I, his business closed, with Alfred E. Haigh buying his equipment and recipes. Haigh's Chocolates was established in 1915 at 34 King William Street, moving to Beehive Corner in 1923. The building was leased for around 25 years, before being sold to Haigh in 1950.

The building underwent some changes through the 1950s to 1970s, including the loss of the original gilded bee (possibly damaged or removed after the 1954 Adelaide earthquake). Parts of its facade were covered, while its gables and balcony were removed. The neo-Gothic facade and prominent turret were refurbished in 1998 by the firm of Harrold and Kite. A newly-designed bee was created during this restoration, made of gilded aluminium and weighing around 45 kg (99 lb).

During September and October 2026, the building is once again being restored, this time back to its 1849 specifications, but also including a replacement for the old neon sign that had been erected on the building by the firm Claude Neon, but since removed. The building remains Haigh's flagship store.

== Heritage listing ==
The Beehive Corner building (32-40 King William Street) was confirmed as a State Heritage Place in the South Australian Heritage Register on 5 April 1984, as "a rare example of commercial Gothic Revival architecture in Adelaide".

== Place in popular culture ==
For over a century, "Meet you at the Beehive Corner" has been a common phrase among Adelaideans when nominating a meeting-place in the city.

Forgotten today, but once a familiar landmark, "Stump's Corner", directly across King William Street from the Beehive Corner, was an earlier rendezvous, named for Alfred Stump (1860–1925), a photographer who had a prominent sign on his studio. (Note: This corner hosted a succession of photographers: Melbourne Photographic Company to 1885, then (briefly) Henry Jones's "Children's Photograph Company", then in 1886 R. Laming before Stump & Co. around 1890.)

"Muirhead's Corner", site of Emanuel Cohen's "Monster Clothing Palace", was diagonally opposite.
