= Adelaide Establishment =

Group of landowners in South Australia

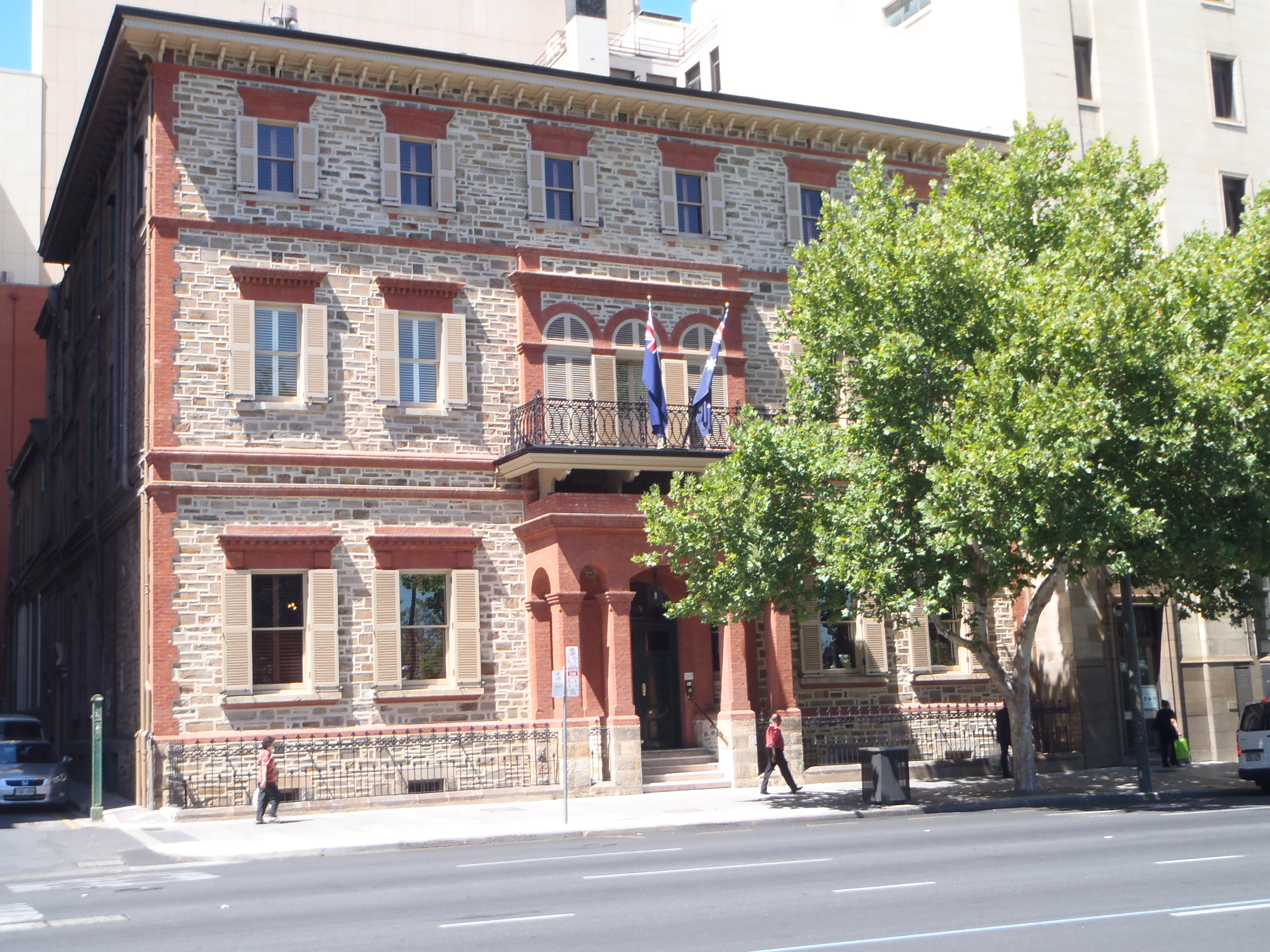
The Adelaide Club is an exclusive gentlemen's club in Adelaide which was associated with members of the Adelaide establishment.

The Adelaide Establishment is the name given to the group of landowners and industrialists who have played a considerable role in the history of South Australia since its foundation in 1836. Based primarily in South Australia's capital Adelaide, the Adelaide Establishment has been referred to as economically, politically and socially conservative and seeking to preserve a rigid social hierarchy and laissez-faire economic system.

While the power of the Adelaide Establishment has waned over the decades, members continue to play a role in the running of Adelaide and South Australia.

The name "Adelaide Establishment" is derived from the term "The Establishment", denoted to mean a network of prominent, well-connected people who exercise power.

== History ==
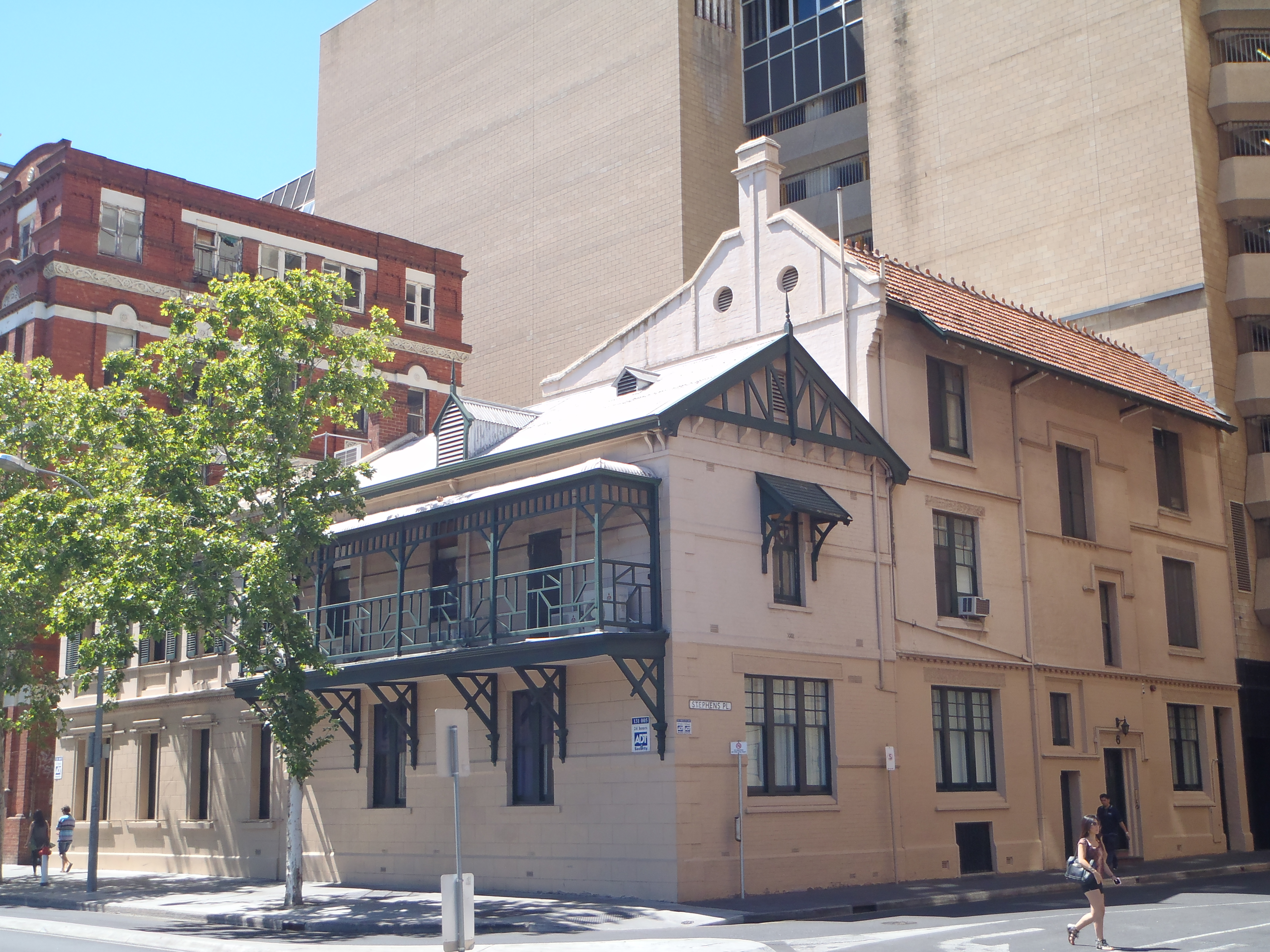
Many female members of the Adelaide Establishment were members of the Queen Adelaide Club.

Following the founding of Adelaide in 1836, wealthy settlers from England, some of whom were related by blood or marriage, were allowed to appropriate the best land for themselves, building a privileged class of wealthy land owners who were able to exert persuasive political and social influence over South Australia, to the point that historians could claim that these people assumed the influence wielded in their localities by the merchants of the Hanseatic League or the Rialto in Venice. As time passed, these families continued to intermarry, solidifying their control to the point that they "exercised, prior to the second world war, a degree of financial influence and control probably unparalleled by any group in any Australian state".

Members of the Adelaide Establishment have served as senior members of the Parliament of South Australia, including Premier of South Australia Sir Thomas Playford IV, from 1938 to 1965 usually through the Liberal and Country League. The diversification of South Australia's economy after World War II through attracting large scale manufacturing enterprises to Adelaide led to the waning of power, but the Adelaide Establishment controlled the South Australian Legislative Council until the electoral reform of the late 1960s that abolished the Playmander.

Examples of Adelaide Establishment families include the:

- Barr Smith family
- Bonython family
- Downer family
- Morphett families

== Sources ==
- Dunstan, D. (1981) Felicia, the political memoirs of Don Dunstan, McMillan: South Melbourne. ISBN 9 780333338155.
- Jaensch, D. (1986) The Flinders history of South Australia. Political history, Wakefield Press: Adelaide. ISBN 9780949268525.
- Jaensch, D. (1977) The Government of South Australia, University of Queensland Press: St Lucia, QLD. ISBN 0 7022 1352 7.
- Mosler, S. (2011) Heritage Politics in Adelaide, University of Adelaide Press: Adelaide. ISBN 0987073036.
- Whitelock, D. (1977) Adelaide 1836 – 1976, University of Queensland Press: Brisbane. ISBN 070221401 9.
