= Jane Tolerton =

New Zealand writer

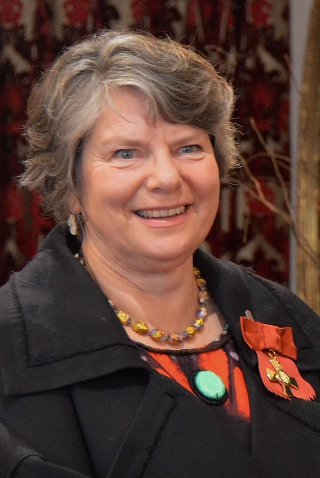
Tolerton in 2016, after her investiture as an Officer of the New Zealand Order of Merit by the governor-general, Sir Jerry Mateparae

Jane Tolerton ONZM CF (born 24 April 1957) is a New Zealand biographer, journalist and historian.

== Biography ==
Tolerton was born in Auckland and attended the University of Canterbury in Christchurch, completing a Bachelor of Arts in history and American studies and a Diploma in Journalism. After graduating, she worked as a newspaper reporter and magazine feature writer, winning the Dulux News Award and the Cowan Prize for historical journalism.

In 1987, Tolerton worked with Nicholas Boyack to set up the World War I Oral History Archive while at the Stout Research Centre at Victoria University of Wellington, and interviewed 85 war veterans about their experiences. The average age of the veterans was 90 and many had served in Gallipoli, the Somme, Passchendaele, and Palestine. She told their stories in later books, including An Awfully Big Adventure, which was named on the New Zealand Listener’s list of 100 best books of 2013. In 1993, her biography of Ettie Rout won the New Zealand Book Award for non-fiction and the PEN best first book prize. In 1996 she was writer in residence at Victoria University of Wellington.

In 2008 and 2009, Tolerton wrote for Te Ara: The Encyclopedia of New Zealand. In 2014, Tolerton received a grant of $12,000 from The New Zealand History Research Trust Fund to research the role that New Zealand women played overseas in World War I. The following year, she was awarded a Churchill Fellowship to travel to the United Kingdom to gather further information for the same project. her book on the topic, Make Her Praises Heard Afar, was published in 2017.

In the 2016 New Year Honours, Tolerton was appointed an Officer of the New Zealand Order of Merit, for services to historical research.

== Publications ==
- In the Shadow of War; New Zealand Soldiers Talk about World War One and Their Lives (co-editor with Nicholas Boyack,1990)
- Ettie: A Life of Ettie Rout (Penguin Books, 1992)
- Convent Girls (Penguin Books, 1994)
- 60s Chicks Hit the Nineties (1996)
- It's Time We Started Telling These Stories (2008)
- An Awfully Big Adventure: New Zealand World War One veterans tell their stories from the interviews (Penguin Books, 2013)
- Ettie Rout: New Zealand’s safer sex pioneer (Penguin Books, 2015)
- Make Her Praises Heard Afar: New Zealand women overseas in World War One (Booklovers Books, 2017)
- But I Changed All That: 'First' New Zealand Women (Booklovers Books, 2018)
