= Australian Woman's Mirror =

Australian weekly women's magazine

The Australian Woman's Mirror
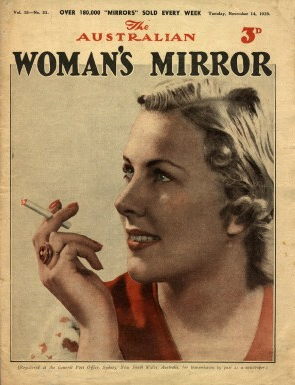
- Categories: Women's magazines
- Frequency: Weekly
- Publisher: The Bulletin
- Founded: 1924
- First issue: 25 November 1924
- Final issue: 1961
- Country: Australia
- Based in: Sydney
- Language: Australian English

The Australian Woman's Mirror was an Australian weekly women's magazine published by The Bulletin magazine in Sydney, between 1924 and 1961.

== History ==
The first issue of the magazine was published on 25 November 1924 with the following statement of intent:

Forty-five years ago a small company planted The Bulletin, and its growth has been so remarkable that to-day the paper is known and read not only in all parts of Australia, but in every English-speaking country. There are, however, interests which The Bulletin has never been able to serve; and the most important of these relate to women. The Woman's Mirror proposes to serve those needs; and it will have behind it the organisation which The Bulletin has built up.

Hitherto it has not been possible for The Bulletin to make use of that large amount of purely feminine writing which it has been offered. Much of it has been fiction, of first-rate quality. The Mirror will present to Australian women the best of this work, along with the work of men who appeal particularly to women readers. Through serials and short stories Australian women writers and Australian women readers will for the first time be brought together; and it is appropriate that the first serial will be one of great interest by Ethel Turner, the best-known of all Australian women novelists. It will be generally admitted that no paper has done so much for Australian literature as The Bulletin; and the readers of The Mirror will benefit by the close contact which The Bulletin has established with every Australian writer of repute.

The story section will, however, be only one of many with which The Mirror will appeal to Australian women. Every feminine interest and activity will be served in the best way that long experience can suggest and money can command. Specialists will help the paper's readers in their dress designing and building; others will help them in the thousand and one matters that perplex the housewife; doctors and nurses will give advice, especially to bush-mothers, with regard to ailments and the sickroom; even the lawyer will be brought into the service to make plain some of the problems that disturb women.

But the woman and the girl of to-day ask for more even than all this. They want to be able to talk entertainingly. The Mirror will set itself out to supply the material. It will tell them a little about books and the people who write them; it will tell them something about plays and players; about pictures and those who make them; about games and the people who are famous in them; about music and musicians. It will have its contributors in London, in Paris, in New York. It will give the country girl an opportunity to tell the city girl the interesting things of the town.

The field is astonishingly large and attractive; and The Mirror believes that it can cover it all without ever printing a dull page.

The magazine was continually published until 28 June 1961 when it was merged with Weekend (Sydney, N.S.W.), to form Everybody's (Sydney, N.S.W.).

== Contents ==
The magazine's contents included the standard recipes, knitting patterns, along with articles about fashion, holiday destinations and household tips. On the literary front it included, on a regular basis, short stories, poems, and serialised novels by such authors as Ethel Turner, Zora Cross, Mabel Forrest, Roderic Quinn, Myra Morris and Kathleen Dalziel, amongst many others. It published a novel by South Australian architect George Soward (1857–1941), entitled The Mirthful Mutineer.

The Australian Woman's Mirror was the first Australian publication to feature the American comic strip The Phantom (beginning 1 December 1936). The Mirror's publication of the Phantom strip resulted in the character becoming popular in Australia. For many years, rival magazine The Australian Women's Weekly ran Mandrake the Magician contemporaneously. Both strips were the work of cartoonist Lee Falk.

== See also ==
- List of women's magazines
