= Percy W. Wise =

(1870–1950) Anglican priest

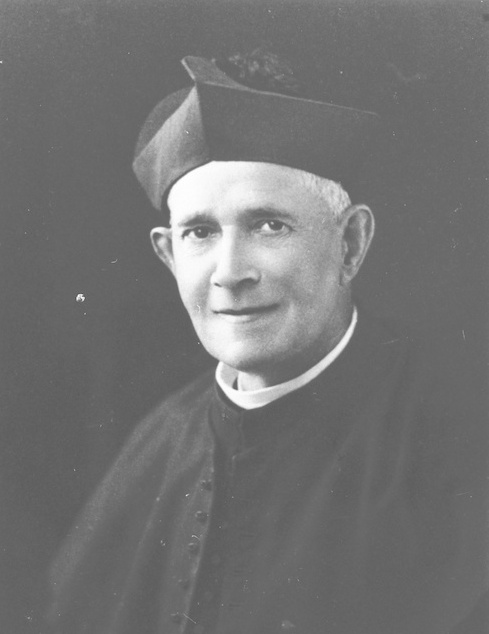

Personal life
- Born: 15 January 1870
- Died: 13 August 1950 (aged 80)
- Education: Corpus Christi College, Cambridge; Clergy Training School

Religious life
- Religion: Christian
- Denomination: Anglican

Senior posting
- Post: Christ Church, North Adelaide; St Augustine's Church, Unley; Church Of The Epiphany, Crafers; Church of St George the Martyr, Goodwood; Christ Church, South Yarra

The Rev. Percy William Charlton Wise (15 January 1870 – 13 August 1950), commonly referred to as Canon Wise, was an Anglican priest in South Australia. He was the subject of controversy for introducing Catholic rites and observances into the Church of St George the Martyr, Goodwood, where he officiated for 40 years.

== History ==
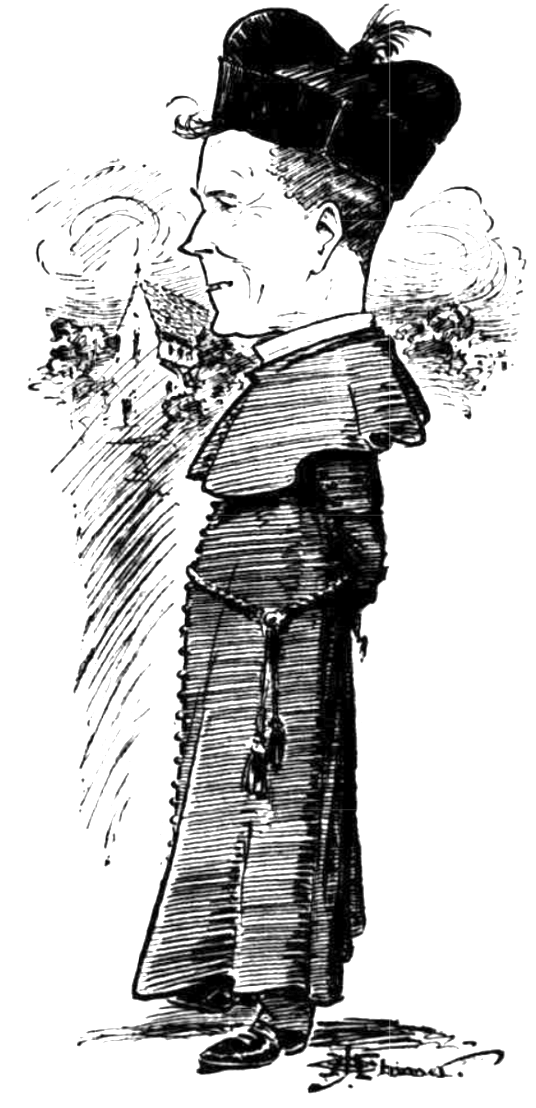
Percy William Wise, caricature by John Henry Chinner

Wise was born at Stoke Damerel, in Plymouth, a son of David Woodifield Wise and his wife Harriet Blanche Wise, née Sheppard. Percy was educated at Clewer House School and Corpus Christi College, Cambridge, where he graduated BA in 1893, and where his circle of friends included the architect Thomas Henry Lyon, John Cowper Powys and John Harmer, later Bishop of Adelaide. He undertook religious training at the Clergy Training School in Cambridge, was made deacon in 1893, ordained as a priest in 1894 and posted as a curate to Oundle, Northamptonshire.

In 1895 he accepted the offer of a curacy at Christ Church, North Adelaide, married Carrie Lyon, sister of his friend the architect, and boarded a ship bound for South Australia. For two years he served there and as acting chaplain to Bishop Harmer. By November he was preaching at St Augustine's Church, Unley and St Peter's Cathedral.

In 1897 Wise was appointed to the Church Of The Epiphany, Crafers, where his energy and infectious enthusiasm breathed new life into the congregation. The church debt was paid off, and a parish room built on church grounds. He was acclaimed as a fine orator and inspiring preacher.

In April 1900 Wise and his wife left for England. She died en route in Manila; her remains would not be interred for another five years. He spent three months working with a Corpus Christi College charity in South London and the remainder in Asia and North America essentially as a tourist. He returned in December to take charge of the Goodwood area which encompassed West Adelaide and Thebarton. The church's previous incumbent was W. S. Moore (12 July 1830 – 17 July 1901), better known as a long-serving principal of the Pulteney Street School.

The original church building (later to become a schoolroom) was, Wise later recalled, a squalid affair with a declining congregation. Assisted by a promise of £1,000 from a wealthy parishioner, a foundation stone was laid by Archbishop Saumarez Smith on 27 September 1902 and the grand new edifice was built to the design of brother-in-law T. H. Lyon by Walter C. Torode and consecrated 1 September 1903. Among its many features included a tiled roof, and a lady chapel, a "first" for an Anglican church in South Australia. The west window was designed by Charles Edward Tute who later settled in Brisbane and designed bookplates for both Wise and Sir Samuel Way. His confidence was well-founded. The church was full to overflowing every week, and to parishioners who objected to the sumptuousness and ritual of the new order, Bishop Harmer advised "go to St Luke's or St Augustine's," but not to bother their rector. Later bishops would not be as complaisant.

Wise had been given an additional appointment as special preacher for St Peter's Cathedral in 1901. He relinquished this in 1904 to concentrate on his work at St George's, Goodwood. A year later he left Adelaide for ten months' holiday in Britain and the "Holy Land"; an elaborate farewell, rivalling that of accorded to church dignitaries on their retirement (including the traditional "purse of sovereigns") was given him by Bishop Harmer and a large assembly.

Wise instituted a "Guild of St Mary of Bethany" to make all the vestments and banners and a "Guild of St George" incorporating four "wards", to supply the church with workers:

- Ward of St Michael for men, performing gardening and general maintenance
- Ward of St Albyn for boys, to supply the church with altar servers
- Ward of St Agnes for girls, forming a supplementary choir
- Ward of Our Lady for women, who organised refreshments at social functions

In 1906 he began a Bible class for primary-school children, held at St George's Church for half an hour before school, three or four days a week.

On 1 June 1907 the foundation stone was laid for a new rectory, designed by Lyon in the style of an old English cottage (after Voysey ?), and consecrated that September.

In 1908, following the resignation of Canon Tucker, Wise was offered the benefice of Christ Church, South Yarra, a handsome church in a genteel and affluent area, but declined to nominate. His parishioners recognised his self-denial with a generous gift of money, which he put towards additional stained glass windows. However, one commentator reckoned he found himself into a position where he could not accept without appearing to have lied.

In 1910 Wise proved himself a popular and successful preacher at St James' Church, Sydney, which was looking for a new priest, no offer was made by their Synod, for reasons not stated, but it may have been due to his High Church leanings, which were never in doubt.

He had another material display of affection on his tenth anniversary at St George's. On this occasion he was presented with a revolving chair, a Cutler roll-top desk and a purse of sovereigns.

In 1917 Wise established a free day school in a separate building, funded by parishioners. A handsome publication "Souvenir of St George's". in aid of the school, was brought out in 1918. The school officially closed in 1944.

A soldiers' memorial, also designed by Lyon, was unveiled in front of the church on 11 November 1923. It commemorated the 130 men from the church and neighbourhood who lost their lives in the Great War.

=== Anglo-Catholicism ===
Wise was a member of CBS, an Anglican movement dedicated to adopting or restoring features of Catholicism into Anglican liturgy, influenced by the Oxford Movement. Bishop Harmer, Canon Poole and archdeacons Hornabrook and Bussell have also been named as sympathetic to what is often referred to as "High Church" or "Ritualism". In these practices Wise was at odds with Harmer's replacement, Bishop A. Nutter Thomas.

- He introduced to services the alb and chasuble and other vestments, one being a 400-year-old rose silk cope from a Spanish cathedral.
- In 1906 he was criticised by Bishop Thomas for the use of the censer and burning incense in services.
- He used candles is services and installed a light to signify the presence of the Host on the High Altar.
- He promoted auricular confession, claiming the authority to proclaim forgiveness of sins which was bestowed by God on priests as part of the gift of ordination.
- He observed Requiem Mass on All Souls' Day (2 November) and celebrated Corpus Christi with candles.
- He taught the doctrine of Transubstantiation and the Real presence of Christ in the Eucharist.
- He asked of his parishioners that they address him as "Father" or "Reverend Father".
- In 1918 he published a "Mass Book for Lay Folk" dictating the forms of Mass to be observed in St George's Church, which closely followed the Roman model, down to the Benediction, Veneration of the Cross and Mass of the Presanctified. The newspaper correspondence between Bishop Thomas and Canon Wise following this publication was decidedly cool.

These observances or appropriations, which the Roman Catholic church looked on with disfavour, were condoned or even encouraged by Bishop Harmer but his successor Bishop Thomas was torn:

This divine has the reputation of "building a church wherever he goes" and has "brought much money into the church" — two cogent reasons for being made a big gun in the Cathedral. But besides this he has abilities which would have placed him in front rank in any sphere of life. To untiring energy and prodigious enthusiasm he adds great tact and an astuteness far ahead of most of the wearers of the cloth. He is eminently practical in all things. And he always has an overcrowded church! When a clergyman has a full church there is no need to mention any other of his qualities. St George's, Goodwood, from being a church of small dimensions, with a congregation content to merely exist, is now a proud edifice with a very live congregation. Here incense is regularly used, and the congregation confess to the priest ! Whether this is strictly in keeping with the laws of "the dear old church" signifies little. Canon Wise is a strong man, and he is prepared to take the responsibility.

In 1920 Bishop Thomas sued Wise in the Ecclesiastical Courts for "breach of ritual", but after several years abandoned the case. Though "defending himself ably" Wise is said to have contracted £500 in legal costs.

== Later life ==
From around 1930 Canon Wise paid little attention to matters outside his church and congregation, and received only passing references from the Press.

Bishop Thomas retired in October 1940. Wise resigned his charge due to ill-health on 1 April 1940, to take effect on 7 October having served as rector of St George's for 40 years. His successor was the Rev. Fr. Arnold M. Morralee, who returned to England in 1947. Rev. Fr A. C. R. Hogan arrived in December 1947. Wise died suddenly at his home on Fullarton Road, Highgate, aged 80, having just returned from a visit to England. Apart from an obituary in The Advertiser, there was little mention in the Press of his passing — no funeral notice, no tributes and no bequests. His remains were cremated and sent to England, where they were interred with those of his wife in the churchyard in Ilsington,

Frequently misunderstood, the Canon had zealously continued his beneficent work despite prejudice and opposition. Apart from profound spiritual attainments, their eyes were met on every hand with evidence of work well done:— A beautiful church with rare and appropriate embellishments. a lovely garden and rectory, the finest Soldiers' Memorial in the State, the only church free-school in South Australia — all entirely free of debt. Canon Wise had speedily gained and retained the devoted love of his people. Canon Wise expressed his appreciation of the sustained loyalty and support which always had been given him. He rejoiced with them that some things dear to their hearts and his had been achieved, and he had been made happy by their declaration that he had been a good priest. To him that was what mattered most. — H. G. Oliphant, warden, St George's Church, on the eve of Wise's retirement.

St George's, Goodwood maintains its position as "Australia's leading Anglo-Catholic church" to this day.

== Benefactors ==
Possibly the best known of St George's congregation, and greatest contributors to the church, were Harry Bickford and his wife Priscilla. Harry Bickford was a member of the A. M. Bickford & Sons family; Priscilla Bickford, née Chambers was a daughter of pastoralist John Chambers. They contributed £3,000 (many millions of dollars in today's currency) towards St George's building fund, and large sums towards other of Wise's endeavours.

While on a visit to Italy they purchased as a gift to St George's Church, a 500-year old bell which had originally hung in a convent in Perugia. The bell was inscribed with the Catholic rendition of Luke i 28: Ave Maria gratia plena Dominus tecum (Hail Mary, full of grace, the Lord is with you) Priscilla Bickford also donated generously to the day school fund.

A series of fourteen relief images cast in Roman cement, depicting the Stations of the Cross, was dedicated to her memory.

The contractor W. C. Torode made a substantial donation to the church in memory of Mrs Lower, mother of Mrs Torode, a regular worshipper at St George's.

Agnes Helen Spence gifted a large crucifix to the church in memory of her parents, Mr and Mrs John Brodie Spence.

== Associates ==
Wilfred George Scholefield was one of several acolytes training for the priesthood under Wise whose entry to St Barnabas' College were refused by Bishop Thomas, effectively blocking their careers. Scholefield was able, by studying at St Chad's Theological College, Lichfield, England, to qualify for the priesthood, and was ordained deacon in 1914. He then served with the British army before returning to Adelaide and St George's Church. In 1920 Bishop Thomas granted him six months' temporary licence to officiate at Goodwood while Wise was in England on holiday, however his later application for a full licence was refused. In another barely restrained newspaper joust, Wise protested, while admitting it was within the bishop's prerogative, providing it was not part of a personal vendetta.

Scholefield then left for Tasmania where he tried to form a religious "Order of the Holy Family", later became priest in charge of St Paul's Church, Risdon Park, Port Pirie.

== Family ==
Wise married Caroline Louisa Lyon in England shortly before leaving for Australia. She was a sister of the architect Thomas Henry Lyon who designed St George's Church, Goodwood and the reredos for St Peter's Cathedral. She died of a fever in the Philippines on 21 May 1900 while en route to London. They had no children and Wise never remarried. A stained glass window in the Church of the Epiphany, Crafers, depicting angels of the Ascension and Resurrection, was dedicated to her memory. The rood screen in St George's designed by T H Lyon, 1905, was also dedicated to her memory.
