= Ettie Rout =

New Zealand writer and safer sex pioneer

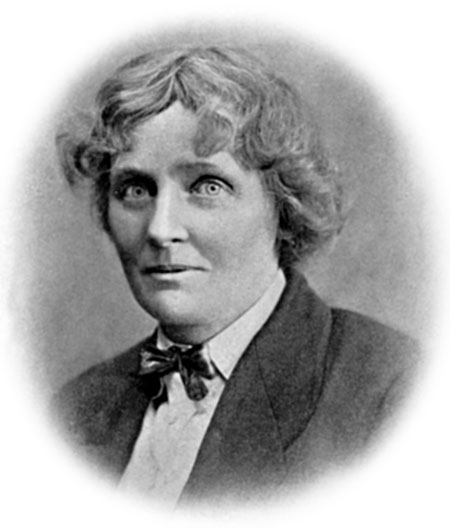
- Rout from the frontispiece of Safe Marriage: A Return to Sanity
- Born: Ettie Annie Rout; 24 February 1877; Launceston, Tasmania
- Died: 17 September 1936 (aged 59); Rarotonga, Cook Islands
- Other name: Ettie Hornibrook
- Organization: New Zealand Volunteer Sisterhood
- Known for: preventing sexually transmitted disease amongst soldiers

Ettie Annie Rout (24 February 1877 – 17 September 1936) was a Tasmanian-born New Zealander whose work among servicemen in Paris and the Somme during World War I made her a war hero among the French, yet through the same events she became persona non grata in New Zealand. She married Frederick Hornibrook on 3 May 1920, after which she was Ettie Hornibrook. They had no children and later separated. She died in 1936, apparently by suicide, and was buried in the Cook Islands.

== Life ==
She was born in Launceston, Tasmania, Australia, but she was raised in Wellington, New Zealand from 1884. After leaving school, she became a shorthand typist for commissions of inquiry and later the Supreme Court (now the High Court, not to be confused with the present Supreme Court). Biographers believe this job gave her a wide range of experiences on social issues. She was later a reporter, businessperson, writer and a campaigner on sexually transmitted infections.

During the Gallipoli campaign, she founded the New Zealand Volunteer Sisterhood, a volunteer nursing group, for women between the ages of 30 and 50. After arriving in Egypt in 1916, Rout was made aware of the prevalence of STI among servicemen and recommended the use of prophylactic kits and the establishment of inspected brothels. She opened the Tel El Kebir Soldiers' Club, and a canteen at El Qantara to provide better rest and recreation facilities. In June 1917, she went to London to encourage the New Zealand Medical Corps into adopting the prophylactic kits, which she sold at the New Zealand Medical Soldiers Club, near New Zealand Convalescent Hospital, Hornchurch. By the end of 1917, the New Zealand Army had made free distribution of her safe sex kit compulsory. It was for her work inspecting brothels in Paris and in the Somme, that she was decorated by the French. In 1917 she and several other New Zealand nurses were Mentioned in Despatches by General Sir Archibald Murray.

In New Zealand, her exploits were considered such that her name, on pain of a £100 fine, could not be published. However, her activities could be published.

Similar ironies were found overseas—her 1922 book, Safe Marriage: A Return to Sanity, was banned in New Zealand, but published in both Australia and Britain. In the latter, it was a best-seller, yet a bishop called her "the wickedest woman in Britain". In 1922, the British Medical Journal recommended the book for medical men and women but noted that "many readers will disagree with the author's point of view, and some will feel grave misgivings about the effect of her teaching; but none can doubt the sincerity of her purpose."

Rout and her husband Frederick Arthur Hornibrook were members of Arbuthnot Lane's New Health Society.

In her book Native Diet: With Numerous Practical Recipes, she advocated for the consumption of fish and poultry but not red meat. She argued that people's health would improve if they cut down on coffee and tea and made their own home-brewed ale and beer.

== Death and legacy ==
In 1936, after Rout and her husband had become estranged, she came back to New Zealand for the first and only time, but her former friends and colleagues did not receive her well. While aboard a ship in Rarotonga in the Cook Islands, she sent out telegrams saying "Ettie died at sea" and took a lethal quinine overdose in what is likely to have been a suicide. She was interred at the London Missionary Society church (now the Cook Islands Christian Church) in Avarua.

In 1983 an episode of the New Zealand television series Pioneer Women dramatised Rout's story. In 1992, Jane Tolerton wrote her biography, and more recently, she has been more critically perceived as a "White Australasia" apologist in Philippa Levine's account of contagious disease legislation within the late nineteenth century British Empire. In 2023 a delegation of members of the New Zealand Remembrance Army and New Zealand veterans unveiled a memorial in Rout's honour in Rarotonga, calling her a "Guardian Angel of the ANZACs" and recognising Rout's contribution to the health of men who served in World War I. In 2024 a painting of Rout was unveiled in Parliament, which will hang in the Beehive.

== Selected publications ==
- Safe Marriage: A Return to Sanity (1922)
- Two Years in Paris (1923)
- Maori Symbolism (1926)
- Native Diet: With Numerous Practical Recipes (1926)
- Whole-Meal With Practical Recipes (1927)
- Stand Up and Slim Down (1934)

== See also ==
- Fanny McHugh – Midwife, volunteer nurse, health patrol, social hygiene lecturer
