= Queen Adelaide Club =

Women's club in Adelaide, South Australia

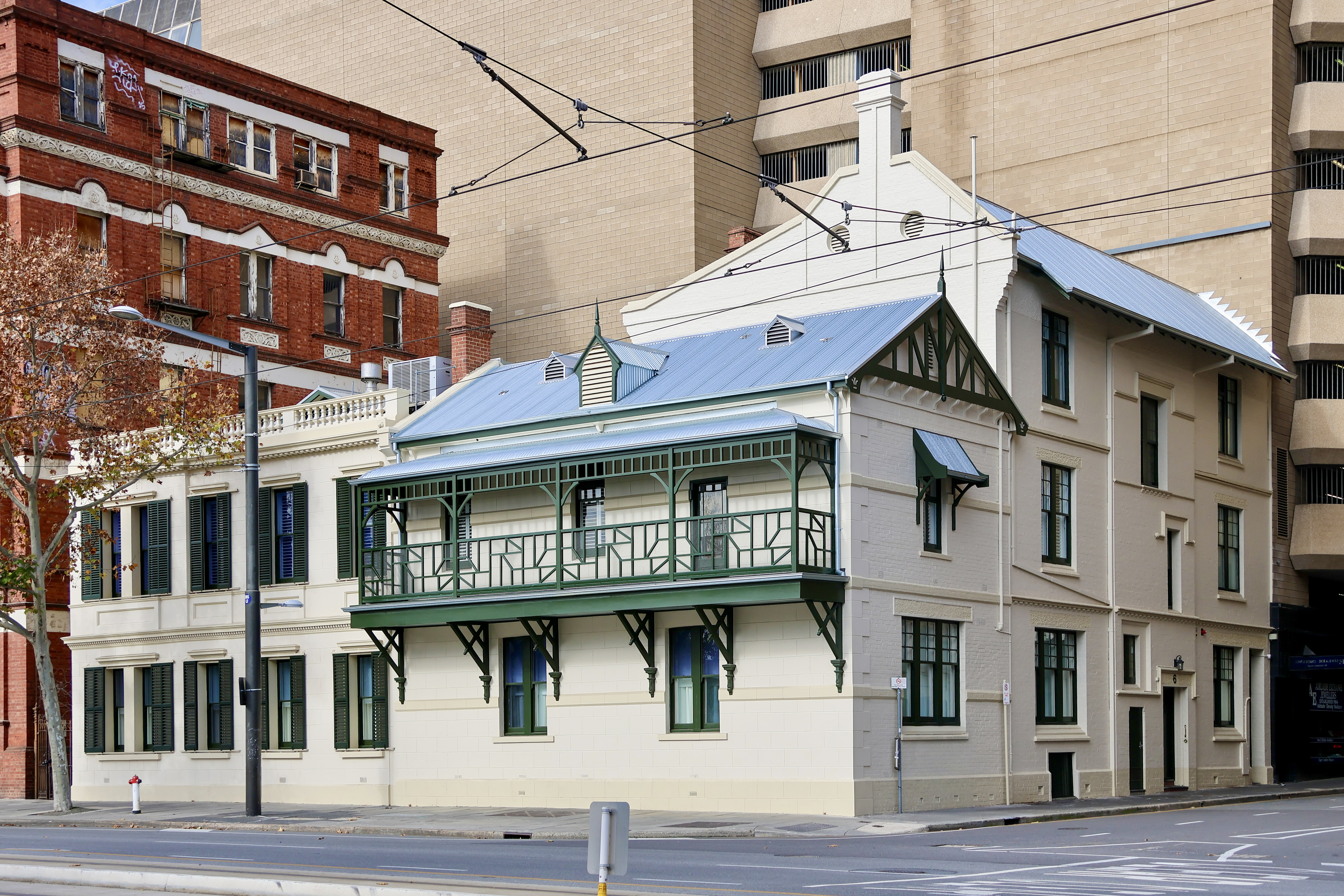
- Queen Adelaide Club in 2026

General information
- Type: Clubhouse
- Location: 6 Stephens Place, Adelaide, South Australia, Australia
- Current tenants: Queen Adelaide Club
- Named for: Adelaide of Saxe-Meiningen
- Year built: 1895
- Opened: July 1909

Design and construction
- Architecture firm: Williams & Good
- Other designers: English & Soward

Website
- queenadelaideclub.com

The Queen Adelaide Club is an exclusive women's club, similar to a gentlemen's club, in the South Australian capital city of Adelaide.

== History ==
The club is named for Adelaide of Saxe-Meiningen, after whom the city of Adelaide was named. Founded in 1909, the club was set up by women of the Adelaide Establishment "who wanted a social centre with a certain standard of living and were prepared to pay for it".

The club is located at the corner of North Terrace and Stephens Place in the city centre, a short distance east along North Terrace from its previously all-male equivalent, the Adelaide Club, established in 1864.

Unlike the purpose-built Adelaide Club building, the Queen Adelaide Club occupies late 19th and early 20th Century buildings which had originally been residences and doctors' consulting rooms.

When first established, the club offered residential accommodation.

== Description ==
The Queen Adelaide Club is affiliated with similar establishments within Australia and internationally, where members can enjoy reciprocal rights.

It no longer offers accommodation, as the Adelaide Club now offers mixed accommodation.

== Proposed expansion ==
In June 2014, Adelaide's Sunday Mail reported that the club had gained approval to knock down two of its three heritage-listed buildings, and build a 21-storey building. The first six (above ground) levels were planned to contain expanded club facilities, and the upper 14 levels were planned to contain pairs of three-bedroom apartments. The third heritage-listed building, at the corner of Stephens Place and North Terrace, was to be retained as the main entrance to the ground floor of the tower, with an adjacent "high end retail tenancy".
