= Adelaide Club =

Social club in Adelaide, South Australia

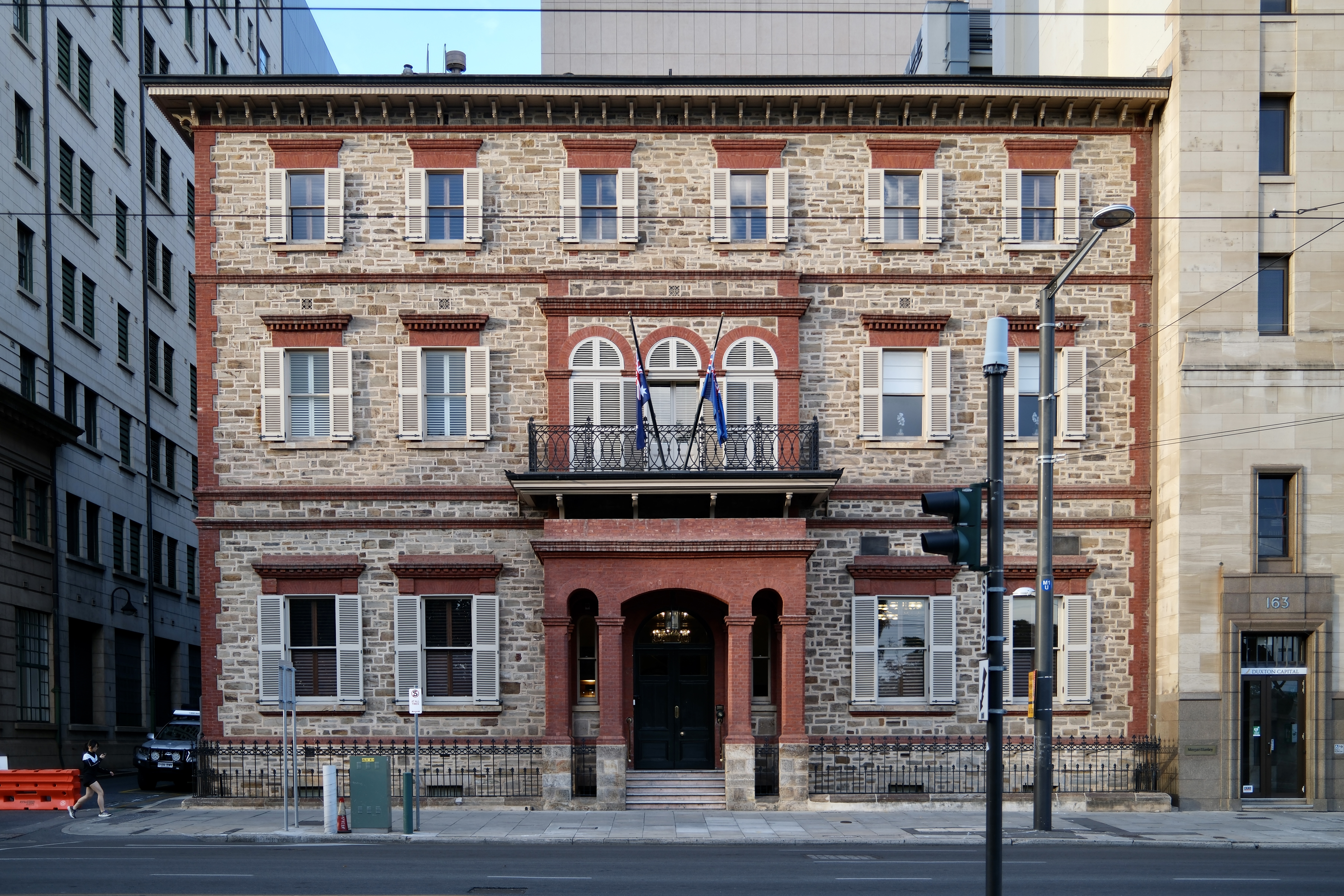
- Front view of Adelaide Club, 2026

General information
- Type: Clubhouse
- Location: 165 North Terrace, Adelaide, South Australia, Australia
- Coordinates: 34.921888°S 138.600017°E
- Year built: 1863–1864
- Completed: 1864
- Client: Adelaide Club

Technical details
- Material: Brick and stone
- Floor count: 3

Design and construction
- Architect: G. & E. Hamilton
- Main contractor: English and Brown; William Lines

Website
- www.adelaide-club.asn.au

South Australian Heritage Register
- Official name: The 'Adelaide Club' Building
- Designated: 28 May 1981
- Reference no.: 10870

The Adelaide Club is an exclusive gentlemen's club situated on North Terrace in the South Australian capital city of Adelaide. Founded in 1863, the club comprises members of the Adelaide Establishment.

== South Australian Club (1838–1843) ==
An earlier club with similar aims and membership was the South Australian Club, founded in 1838, which purchased the Victoria Hotel from William Williams on Hindley Street for their premises. Members included Sturt, Morphett and Fisher. Membership was by ballot; joining fee 10 gns., membership 2 gns. per annum. It folded in 1843 after failing financially.

== History and description ==
The club's headquarters are at the club house at 165 North Terrace in the city centre. The club house was built in the same year as the club's establishment in 1864, after 14 prominent colonists, including John Baker, John Morphett and Arthur Blyth, raised £4000 for the building. The building was designed by one of the founding members, Edward Angus Hamilton, and the club adopted the grass tree as their crest.

The majority of the founding members were pastoralists, with a large number of businessmen, and there were many lawyers and government officials among them. Most were Anglicans.

In 1891 extensive additions were made to the rear. In 1980, the club house was listed on the now-defunct Register of the National Estate. Facilities include a library, mixed accommodation for members and reciprocal club members, dining rooms, billiards room, function rooms and office facilities.

== Equivalent women's club ==
The equivalent elite club for women, the Queen Adelaide Club, is located a short distance to the east along North Terrace.

== Notable members ==
Members of the Adelaide Club have included:

- George Fife Angas
- John Howard Angas
- Henry Ayers
- John Baker
- Robert Barr Smith
- Arthur Blyth
- David Brookman
- Roy Burston
- George W. Cotton
- Darcy Rivers Warren Cowan
- Alexander Downer
- Lloyd Dumas
- Thomas Elder
- William Everard
- James Hurtle Fisher
- Michael Harbison
- Edward Hamilton
- Edward Angus Hamilton
- George Hamilton
- Walter Hughes
- Walter Watson Hughes
- Roland Ellis Jacobs
- Philip Levi
- G. C. Ligertwood
- Charles Mann
- George Mayo
- Ian McLachlan
- John Morphett
- Hugo Carl Emil Muecke
- Angas Parsons
- Christopher Pyne
- A. E. V. Richardson
- George Riddoch
- John Riddoch
- Arthur Rymill
- William John Sowden
- Samuel Tomkinson
- William Wigley

== See also ==
- Country club
