= Wheeling Park =

Park in Ohio County, West Virginia, United States

Coordinates: 40.058°N 80.667°W

Wheeling Park, formerly Hornbrook's Park, is a 406 acres (1.64 km^{2}) park located in Wheeling, West Virginia. The park first opened in 1925. The park was originally only open during the warmer months. In 1959, the addition of an ice rink turned the park into a year-round facility.

Wheeling Park High School, which was named after the park, is located adjacent to the hilltop area of the park.

== Park Features ==
- Olympic size swimming pool
- 350 feet (110 m) long water slide that winds down the hillside
- 9 Hole Golf Course
- 18 Hole Miniature Golf Course
- Indoor and outdoor tennis courts
- Soccer Fields
- Good Lake, featuring paddle boats and a snack bar
- Skating Rink
- Outdoor amphitheater
- Playground
- Numerous picnic spots and shelters
- The White Palace

== History ==
Wheeling Park was originally part of an estate owned by Thomas Hornbrook, an English immigrant. At that time (late 1800s) the park was known as "Hornbrook's Park". The park has undergone many changes over the years. In the early 1900s it was a private amusement park with rides, a swimming pool, and a gambling casino. For a time, the park was owned and operated by the Reymann Brewing Company, who patterned it after German beer gardens. Prohibition and economic downturns at the end of World War I forced the park to close.

In 1924, Charles Sonneborn and Louis Haller purchased the property, intending to subdivide it into residential lots. they offered to sell the property back to the city if enough public funds could be acquired to buy and equip the park. Many local businessmen came forward, including W.E. Stone and Earl W. Oglebay, and eventually enough funds were gathered to keep the park open for public use.

The park was renamed "Wheeling Park" and opened to the public on May 30, 1925.

The White Palace was constructed in 1926, on the site of the former gambling casino which had been destroyed in a fire.

The golf course opened in 1926.

The "Madonna of the Trail" statue was erected by the Daughters of the American Revolution in 1928.

The Frank Rock Garden was created in 1929.

The Schwertfeger Shelter opened in 1948. The Stifel Playground also opened in 1948.

The Memorial Ice Rink opened in 1959.

The W.E. Stone Memorial Clubhouse and Pool opened in 1968, with a water slide added in 1979.

A boathouse, dock and miniature golf course were added to the Good Lake in 1972.

A tennis dome was erected in 1972.

The hilltop area at Wheeling Park started its development with Sonneborn Shelter, completed in 1973. Six tennis courts and the Boyce Tennis Shelter were added to the hilltop in 1984, and the soccer field complex was added in the late 1980s.
