= F. A. Hornibrook =

Irish physical culturalist and writer

Frederick Arthur Hornibrook
- Born: 1878; Dublin
- Died: 1965 (aged 86–87)
- Occupations: Physical culturalist, writer

Frederick Arthur Hornibrook (1878–1965) was an Irish physical culturalist and writer best known for his book The Culture of the Abdomen.

== Biography ==
Hornibrook was born in Dublin in 1878 from a middle-class professional family. He was influenced by Eugen Sandow and trained at Sandow's London Institute. Hornibrook became a physical culture instructor and lecturer. In the early 20th century he emigrated to New Zealand and established a Sandow Room fitted with dumb-bells at the Avon Prince Sanatorium in Christchurch. He was Sandow's official representative. He lectured on physical culture and promoted it as cure for alcoholism and other ills.

Hornibrook completely reshaped his body under the Sandow system and was referred to in the press as "Brawnibrook". He became the best known Sandow instructor in New Zealand. After WW1 he moved to London and became a massage therapist. His clients were famous and included H. G. Wells and Arnold Bennett. Hornibrook's most well known book was The Culture of the Abdomen published in 1924. The book sold well, went through eighteen editions and remained in print until the 1960s. It contrasted the bad posture and protruding abdomen of "civilized man" with the "splendid physique" of native men.

To combat constipation and obesity, Hornibrook developed a system of physical culture which emphasized daily rhythmic abdominal exercises based on native dancing rituals. Hornibrook and his wife Ettie Rout hosted native dance lessons which were attended by members of the London Society in the 1930s. He obtained a successful income and moved to a luxurious apartment in South Street, Park Lane. Hornibrook promoted Maori dances as having important components of physical culture such as breathing exercises and body movements centred on the abdomen. He described the Fijians, Polynesians and Zulus as "magnificent men" who had superb bodies in contrast to town dwellers that paid no attention to the welfare of their bodies. His system was endorsed by Sir William Arbuthnot Lane President of the New Health Society who wrote a Preface to Hornibrook's book. Hornibrook and his wife have been described as "tireless popularizers of Lane's theories and the wider aims of the society". Hornibrook and Lane were advocates of auto-intoxication.

Hornibrook and his wife held the view that the source of ill health is chronic constipation. Hornibrook believed that the overloaded colon is the "white man's burden" because it should be emptied at least several times a day. He attributed constipation to the faulty posture common amongst people in industrialized societies. Politician John A. Lee attended a lecture of Hornibrook and later exchanged letters. Lee wrote that he owed his life to Hornibrook's "deep breathing apostleship and still later to his famous Culture of the Abdomen".

== Selected publications ==
- The Culture of the Abdomen: The Cure of Obesity and Constipation (with a preface by Sir William Arbuthnot Lane, 1924, republished in 1933)
- Physical Fitness in Middle Life (1926)
- Without Reserve (autobiography, 1935)
- Health Culture for Women: The Sane Way to Slim (with Ettie Rout. With a preface by Arthur Keith, 1959)
