= C. A. Hornabrook =

Australian mine manager and hotelier

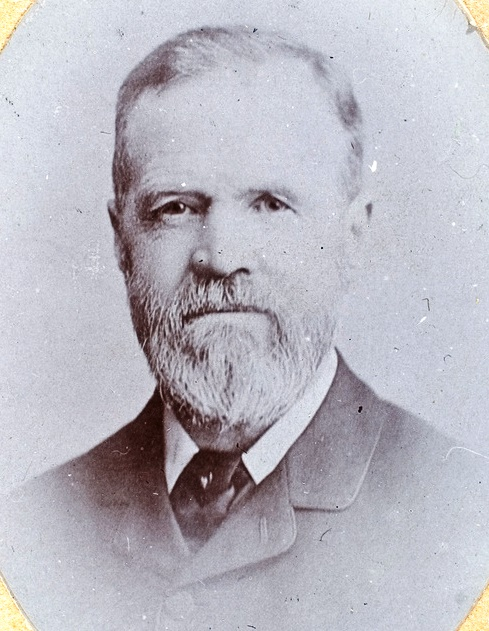
C. A. Hornabrook, hotelier and businessman, c. 1885

Charles Atkins Hornabrook (c.1833 – 26 August 1903) was a businessman in the colony of South Australia who made a fortune from property development in the city of Adelaide and investments in Broken Hill Proprietary and other mining prospects. He is remembered as the owner and developer of the York Hotel, at the time regarded as Adelaide's finest.

== Background ==
The widower, John Mitcham Hornabrook of Egloskerry, Cornwall, England, with his children Ann Greenfield Hornabrook and Charles Atkins Hornabrook arrived in South Australia in December 1838 aboard Glenalvon.

In December 1849, John Hornabrook applied for the publican's licence for the York Hotel, a modest family hotel at the south-east corner of Rundle and Pulteney streets, previously held by its founder, Jane Bathgate (died June 1869). He was successful but only on the casting vote of a chairman.

In 1854 the licence was transferred to John Bray, previously landlord of the "Grace Darling" and "Glenelg Hotel", and brother-in-law of John Hornabrook's brother-in-law.

John Hornabrook married Sarah née Shephard, whose sister, Anna Shephard (died 18 July 1876), married one John Bray, date and location as yet unknown and died before her. There are three John Brays known in South Australia at the time, one being John Cox Bray, another a miner in Moonta. The third John Bray (c. 1812 – 1 March 1868), who arrived aboard Hartley in October 1837 and died at residence, Pulteney Street is a likely candidate.

The fact of his daughter Alice marrying someone of a similar name may be entirely coincidental. Bray was not an uncommon surname in 1850s South Australia.

== History ==
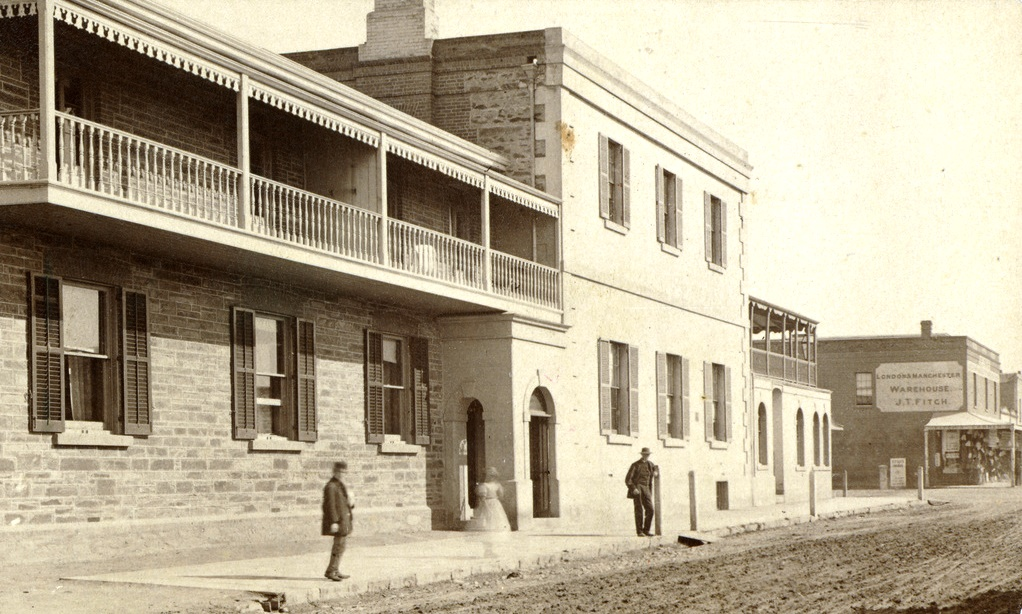
York Hotel, Adelaide in 1866, Rundle Street east

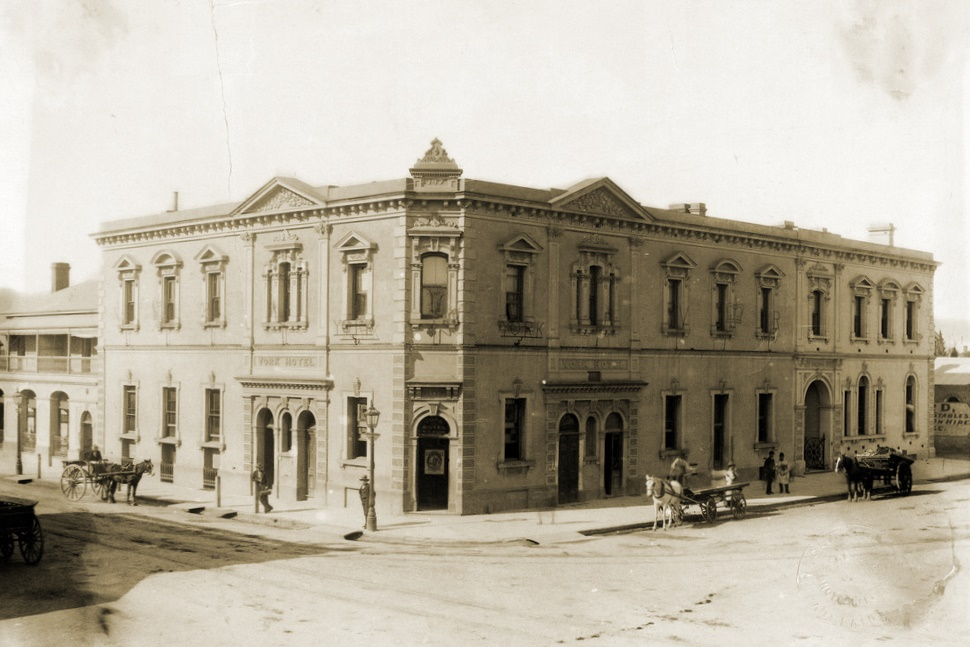
York Hotel, corner Rundle and Pulteney Streets, Adelaide c. 1880

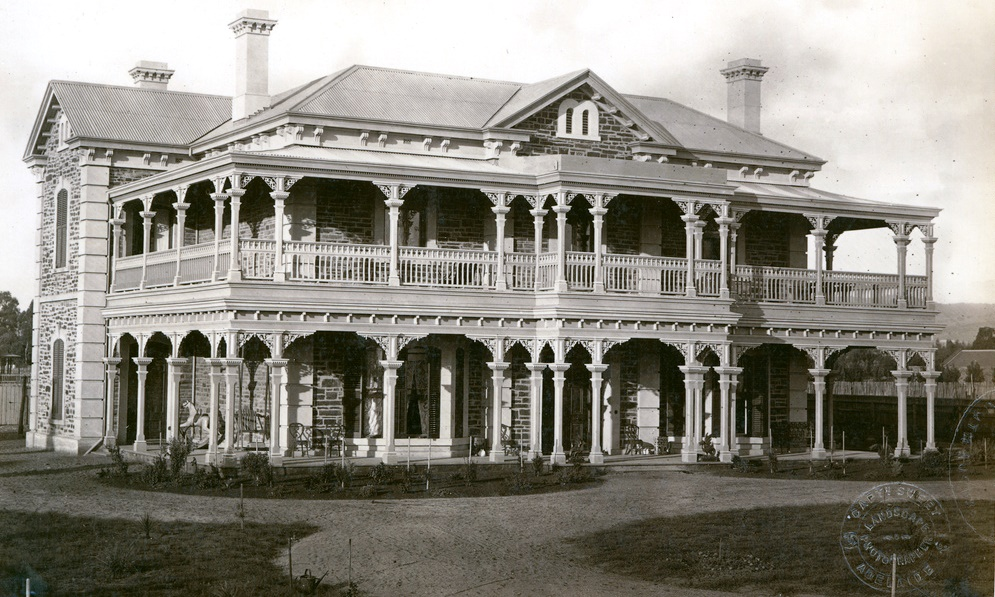
"Kalymna", Dequetteville Terrace, Kent Town, in 1875

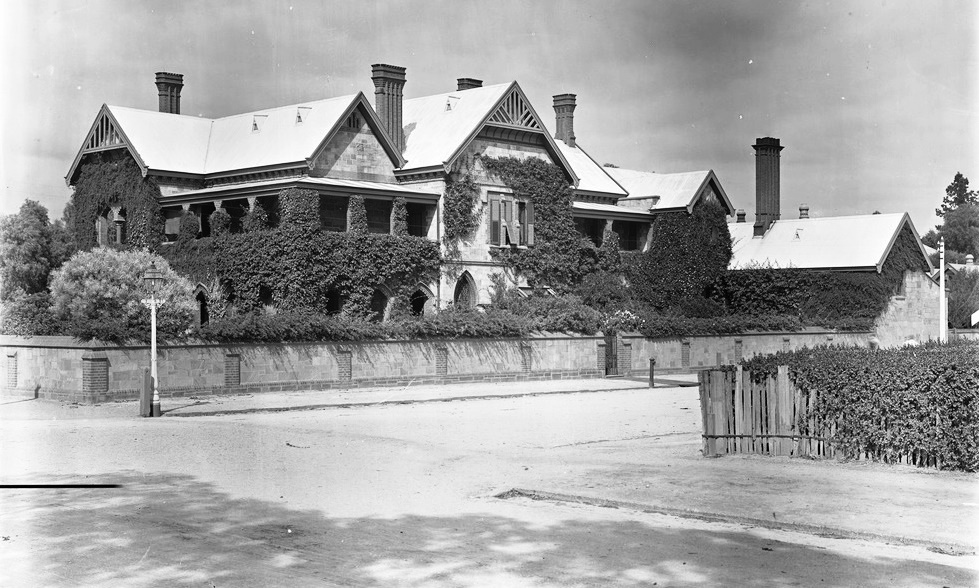
"Eothen" (later St Corantyn), East Terrace, Adelaide in 1900

C. A. Hornabrook first became interested in Rundle Street in 1851, when he leased Town Acre 39 from Samuel George Smith, of the London banking firm of Smith, Payne & Smiths, then sublet it for building.

In 1857 he applied, successfully, for the licence for the York Hotel previously held by his father, then by John Bray. That same year he married Eliza Maria Soward, half-sister of architect George Klewitz Soward. In 1863 the first major improvement was commissioned: a separate building adjacent on Rundle Street with seven bedrooms with balconies projecting over the footpath, and a bathroom. Soward was the architect and Charles Farr the builder.

In 1867, he purchased a property between Third and Fourth Creeks near Magill, previously owned by Dr David Wark, but apparently not Wark's residence "Alton", which was owned by Daniel Chappell between 1862 and 1876.

In 1868, he had Charles Farr pull down the old portion of the York Hotel, and in its place build a new "pile" designed by Daniel Garlick. George Scarfe, the (unmarried) man largely responsible for the preeminence of Harris, Scarfe & Co., was a longtime resident. In 1878, substantial additions were made by Woods & McMinn, notably the addition of two billiard rooms and a row of shops. W. E. Ford was the new licensee, but Hornabrook retained ownership until 1900, when he sold it for £28,000 by the Melbourne firm of Foy & Gibson.

It was demolished by Foy and Gibson in 1909 to make way for the Grand Central Hotel, of six storeys in the style of their emporium next door. but despite some high-profile guests (the Prince of Wales in 1920, Arthur Conan Doyle in 1922), it never prospered, and around 1925 was incorporated into the emporium. It later became showrooms and offices for the Electricity Trust, then in 1975–1976 was demolished to make way for a multi-level car park, which was later hidden by the "Rundle Lantern" a hoarding of aluminium panels, individually illuminated.

In 1874, he commissioned Farr to build the imposing residence "Dunheved House" later "Kalymna" (architect Thomas English), which still stands at 28 Dequetteville Terrace, Kent Town.

A large collection of their furnishings and household goods was sold by auction in 1879 prior to leaving, with their six youngest children, on a trip to England by the clipper Hesperus, sharing the saloon with the Rischbieth family. Hornabrook returned alone in April 1882 on the steamer Cuzco, staying at "Landrowna Terrace", Victoria Square, resigned his directorship of several companies including Grove Hill Gold Mining Company. In 1887 he offered some £30,000 worth of shares at auction in a slow market. He then became, with J. M. Wendt and a few others, a major shareholder in the Baker's Creek gold mine at Hillgrove, New South Wales.

In 1891, he had a new residence built at the south corner of East Terrace and Gilles Street, designed by George Klewitz Soward, naming it "Eöthen". In 1928 it became the home of Sir Lavington Bonython and his family, renamed "St Corantyn".

== Recognition ==
- It has been asserted that Charles Street (a private thoroughfare between Rundle Street and North Terrace, east of Gawler Place) was named for him.
- In 1887, he was appointed Justice of the Peace, and served as magistrate on many prominent prosecutions.
- In 1890, he was elected a Fellow of the Royal Colonial Institute.
- in 1891, he was elected a patron of the Medindie Football Club.

== Family ==
John Mitcham Hornabrook (c. 1812 – 23 August 1862), whose first wife, Margaret Hornabrook née Atkins, died 18 February 1837, arrived with his two children in South Australia in December 1838 aboard Glenalvon. He married the widow, Sarah Attwood, née Shephard (c. 1811 – 26 May 1902), on 23 November 1847. Her daughter, Annie Attwood (c. 1844 – 26 February 1860), drowned at Glenelg. Sarah's mother, Ann Shephard (c. 1864 – 18 September 1848), died at their home on Rundle Street.

After the death of her husband, Sarah and their three children, Lilla (b.c. 1846) and twins Joseph and Alice (b. 1850) made an extended visit to England, returning aboard Yatala in 1866. The widow Sarah Hornabrook was living at "York Villa", Mitcham in 1873, South Terrace, Adelaide in 1876, died at "Eothen", East Terrace.

- Ann Greenfield Hornabrook (15 January 1831 – 27 November 1899) returned to England, where she married John Martin (c. 1828 – 7 July 1868); the couple returned to SA August 1850 aboard Bengal. Her brother Charles returned on the same ship, presumedly having attended the wedding.

- Louisa Hornabrook Martin (14 January 1851 – 26 January 1935) married Alfred Witter Marshall (31 October 1850 – 16 December 1915) of Marshall & Sons on 14 February 1873

- Charles Atkins Hornabrook JP (c. 1833 – 26 August 1903) married Eliza Maria Soward (c. 1838 – 26 January 1901) on 18 March 1857. Eliza was a daughter of George Soward (1809 – 16 January 1894) and the half-sister of architect George Klewitz Soward, who designed their residence.

- Eliza Maria Hornabrook (1858– ) married Lewis Angelo Jessop (c. 1843 – 16 October 1922) on 11 December 1879. Jessop was chairman of the A. M. P. Society Adelaide branch and president of the Adelaide Chamber of Commerce.
- Rev. (later Canon then Archdeacon) Charles Soward Hornabrook (25 December 1859 – 25 September 1922) married Anna Elizabeth Johanna Newton ( – 5 September 1953) on 1 July 1891

- Harold Newton Hornabrook (1892 – 23 July 1951) married Mabel Parmenter ( – ) on 30 August 1919, lived in Tranmere, then Colac, Victoria. He was head of the Electricity Commission of Geelong.
- Lieut Leonard Charles Hornabrook (1895 – 21 May 1918) invalided out of RFC in WWI, joined Leicester Regiment, died in action from gas poisoning
- Dorothy Anna Hornabrook (1898– ) married (Edward) Arnold Van Senden (1894 – ) in 1923
- Dr. R(eginald) Denys Hornabrook (1900– ) married Elinor Mary Constance "Mollie" Rutherford (1904– ) on 19 June 1928
- Jean Mary "Joan" Hornabrook (1904–1991)

- Arthur John Hornabrook (c. 1861 – 30 March 1874)
- George Soward Hornabrook (c. 1863 – 29 November 1892) died at Southern Cross, Western Australia
- Annie Hornabrook (1865 – 13 April 1938) was associated with Dr. Helen Mayo in child welfare work.
- Mabel Susan Hornabrook (1867– ) was alive in SA in 1880, perhaps in 1906, but further information is wanting.
- Lilla Bertha Hornabrook (1869 – 13 December 1928)
- Dr. Rupert Walter Hornabrook (3 August 1871 – 7 May 1951) married (Emma) Winifred Sargood on 17 May 1902. Winifred was third daughter of Sir Frederick Sargood, "Rippon Lea", Elsternwick, Victoria. He was plague specialist, served in South Africa, returned to Adelaide 1902. Recognised as Australia's first full-time anaesthetist. He played football for North Adelaide 1889–90. A son, Royden Sargood Hornabrook (21 February 1909 – 5 November 1944) died a POW in Thailand.
- Amy Sarah Hornabrook (1873 – 13 May 1904) ended her life by taking carbolic acid.
- Harry Alfred Hornabrook (1875 – 10 January 1916) married Mary Sarah ??, lived Roseville, New South Wales, died at Moss Vale, NSW, of pneumonia, contracted while in Army camp.

John Mitcham Hornabrook (c. 1812–1862) married the widow Sarah Attwood, née Shephard (c. 1811–1902) on 23 November 1847. They had three children together:

- Lilla Hornabrook (c. 1846 – 27 August 1920) married surgeon John Fisher ( – 6 January 1879) on 9 January 1868. They had two sons and a daughter.
- Joseph Alfred Hornabrook (28 April 1850 – 6 March 1930) married Alice Page ( –1937) on 16 September 1873. Partner Rees & Hornabrook, architects. They had two surviving daughters.
- Alice Maud Hornabrook (28 April 1850 – 13 July 1935) married John Cox Bray on 13 January 1870, lived at 56 Hutt Street, Adelaide

- Arthur John Bray (1872–1879)
- Cecil Thomas Bray (27 September 1874 – 19 October 1937)
- Harry Midwinter Bray (10 June 1879 – 12 October 1965)
- (Blanche) Ada Bray (10 November 1881 – 5 November 1908) married (John) Lavington Bonython (10 September 1875 – 6 November 1960) on 16 April 1904. A window in her memory, created by Charles Edward Tute, was installed in St Paul's Church, Adelaide in 1909. It was transferred to All Souls Church, St Peters in 1983.

- John Langdon Bonython AO (13 January 1905 – 1992) married Minnie Hope Rutherford ( – ) in 1926
- Elizabeth Hornabrook "Betty" Bonython CBE (25 January 1907 – 2008) married lawyer (later Sir) Keith Wilson in 1930
- Ada Bray Bonython (1908–1965) married Denis Heath in 1930

Joseph Hornabrook (c. 1799 – 7 April 1876) was the elder brother of John Hornabrook, died at South Terrace home of his sister-in-law
