= Fanny McHugh =

Midwife, volunteer nurse, health patrol, social hygiene lecturer

Fanny McHugh (née Balmer; 21 August 1861 – 17 December 1943) was a New Zealand midwife, volunteer nurse, health patrol and social hygiene lecturer. She was born in Auckland, New Zealand on 21 August 1861. She ran the Turakina General Store. After her husband died (before 1904) she moved to Manaia and registered as a midwife. During the First World War she volunteered for the New Zealand Volunteer Sisterhood, and worked in England and Egypt. On her return to New Zealand she worked for the Department of Health, undertaking "health patrols" and later lecturing on "social hygiene".
