= R. W. Hornabrook =

Australian medical doctor (1871–1951)

Rupert Walter Hornabrook (3 August 1871 – 7 May 1951) was a medical doctor, recognised as Australia's first specialist anaesthetist.

== History ==
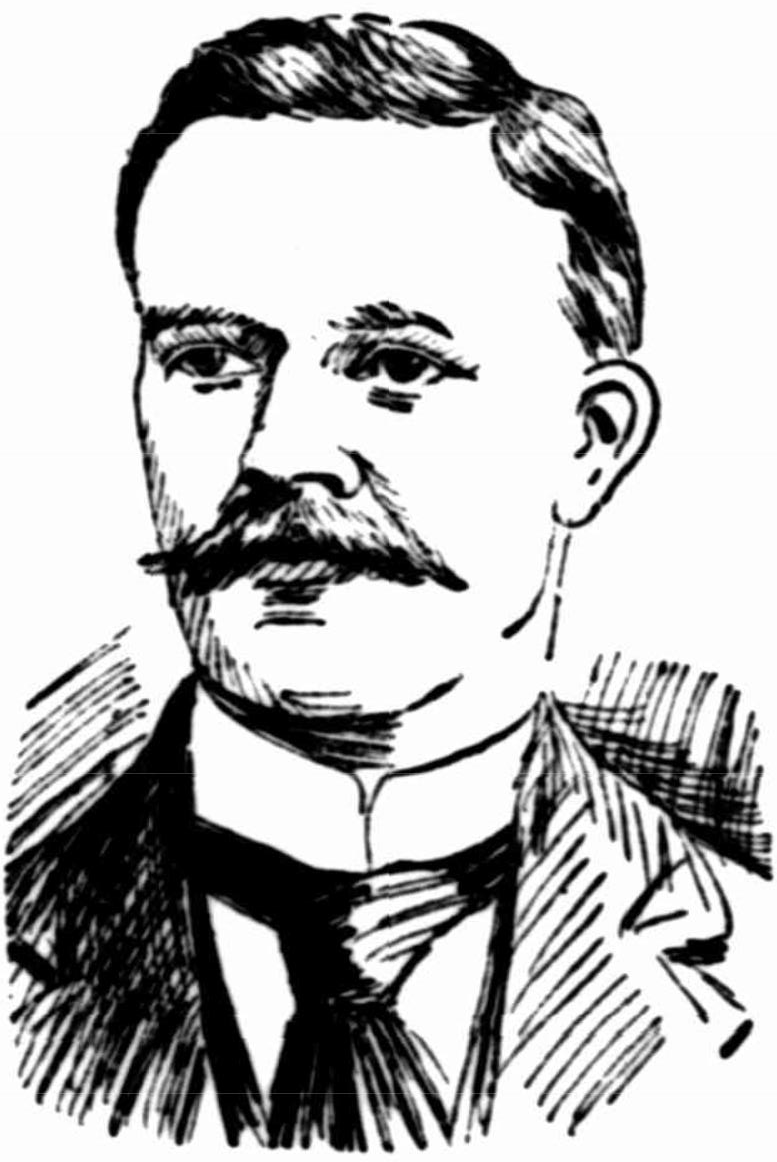
Dr. Rupert Hornabrook

Hornabrook was born in Kent Town, South Australia, a son of Charles A. Hornabrook and his wife Eliza, née Soward. John Hornabrook, owner of the York Hotel, at the corner of Pulteney and Rundle streets, Adelaide was a grandfather. He was educated at St Peter's College, before studying for the (Anglican) priesthood under Canon Field and F. A. D'Arenberg then was admitted to the University of Adelaide, studying medicine, in 1891. After completion of his bachelor's degree, and during his internship at the Adelaide Hospital, the "Adelaide Hospital Row" disrupted teaching, and many, Hornabrook included, left for hospitals overseas to complete their training.

A dispute arose in 1894 when a sister of the Chief Secretary (later Sir) John Gordon was appointed to a senior nursing post over several, arguably better qualified, applicants. A letter of protest was sent by these nurses to the Board, which treated the petition as gross impertinence, as they did representations by Hornabrook. Under pressure, all but one of the signatories, Nurse Graham [q.v.], backed down, creating a cause célèbre. Acting outside his authority, Premier Kingston sacked the Board, replacing them with men of his own choosing.
On 8 April 1896, 17 members of the Adelaide Hospital’s honorary staff resigned in protest, though maintaining service until replacements had arrived.
Kingston recruited several British doctors to take up the slack. Rivalry between surgeons Napier (one of the "strikebreakers") and Corbin was so acrimonious that patient welfare suffered. Hornabrook contributed his own observations to the public discourse.
Kingston’s government fell in 1899 and the issue faded away. The dispute with the University was resolved by the quiet diplomacy of William Mitchell, professor of philosophy, and teaching resumed in 1902.

Hornabrook, along with fellow South Australian J. A. Bonnin, completed his medical training at "Barts" (St Bartholomew's Hospital) in London in 1897, adding qualifications M.R.C.S. and L.R.C.P. to his MB., and accepted a locum tenens position at the West London Hospital. In 1898 he commenced working for the Government of India combating bubonic plague as Chief Medical Plague Officer of Dharwar. A year later he was in the South African Republic performing similar work, where it was feared the disease was being brought in by Indian workers. Later that year he joined the Imperial troops in South Africa as a medical officer, and was credited with several displays of bravery and was wounded under fire, before being laid low with sunstroke and enteric fever during the Siege of Ladysmith. Hornabrook returned to Adelaide briefly in March 1901 before proceeding to Melbourne, where he was an invited guest at the Public Schools Old Boys' reunion. In May 1902 at St George's (Presbyterian) Church, St Kilda, Victoria he married Miss E. Winifred Sargood, daughter of Sir Frederick Sargood of Rippon Lea Estate. He transferred to the Australian Army Corps, and in February 1904 was appointed lieutenant, promoted to captain the following year.

In February 1904 he was called to the Celtic Queen, from Acapulco, anchored off Wallaroo, three of whose crew had died, and most of the rest laid low by fever.

He spent much of the years 1907–1908 in London, studying anaesthetics under one Dr. Barker, perhaps Arthur Edward James Barker (10 May 1850 – 1916) at the Queen Alexandra Military Hospital, Millbank.

Hornabrook, his wife and small family moved to Victoria in early 1909, settling at Lansdowne Road, East St Kilda. He was appointed assistant anaesthetist to the Melbourne General Hospital, where he is credited with popularizing use of the "ethyl chloride-ether sequence" (chloroethane followed by di-ethyl ether) for general anaesthesia.

Following the outbreak of the First World War, Hornabrook on 3 August 1914 enlisted with the Permanent Naval Force on battlecruiser HMAS Australia, serving as temporary surgeon under Staff Surgeon Alexander Ruan Caw. HMAS Australia was involved with the AN&MEF, which captured German New Guinea, then joined the Royal Navy's Grand Fleet as flagship of the 2nd Battlecruiser Squadron, patrolling the North Sea, but saw little action. Hornabrook resigned his commission on 7 August 1915 and enlisted with the Australian Army and sailed for England with the First AIF aboard the liner, later troopship, SS Medic. He served in 1 AGH, 11 Surgical Team, and 12 CCS, and was promoted major in September 1917. He had his appointment terminated in December 1917 in order to take up anaesthetic work at Melbourne University.

Hornabrook maintained his interest in anaesthesia after the war, but confined his practice to the Children's Hospital, the Melbourne Dental College, and the Victorian Eye and Ear Hospital. He retired in 1934 after suffering a heart attack.

He was in 1929 elected the first chairman of the Anaesthetics section of the British Medical Association, Victorian branch. In 1934 Hornabrook and Gilbert Brown (the Society's first president) were foundation members of the Australian Society of Anaesthetists.

Hornabrook died at his home, 10 Toorak Avenue, Toorak, Victoria.

== Other interests ==
He was active in a variety of sports, rowing for St Peter's College, playing football for North Adelaide 1889–90. He adjudicated

He had a close relationship with St John's Ambulance Brigade, giving lectures and adjudicating at competitions.

He was a member of the Australian Club, Melbourne

He was the author of numerous "Letters to the Editor" (more like essays) on a variety of subjects:

- Export of eggs to England
- Donation of a hospital to Russia

He was the author of a booklet:

- Great Britain and The East (1940) 13pp.

== Family ==
Rupert Walter Hornabrook (3 August 1871 – 7 May 1951) married (Emma) Winifred Sargood ( – ) in May 1902. Winifred was a daughter of Sir Frederick Sargood. Their children were:

- (Rupert) Keith Hornabrook (4 May 1903 – ) born at Dutton Tce, Medindie, married Edith Mary Connell on 26 May 1930
- (Winifred) Joan Hornabrook (7 April 1906 – )
- Royden Sargood Hornabrook (21 February 1909 – 5 November 1944) born in East St Kilda, Victoria, married Jean Beatrice Willan on 4 April 1941, died a POW in Thailand
- Gwenda Marion Hornabrook (19 March 1911 – ) born in Malvern, Victoria, married John Campbell Guthrie on 9 August 1939
- Betty Soward Hornabrook (19 March 1911 – ) born in Malvern, Victoria, married Hugh de Neufville Lucas on 15 January 1946
