= C. S. Hornabrook =

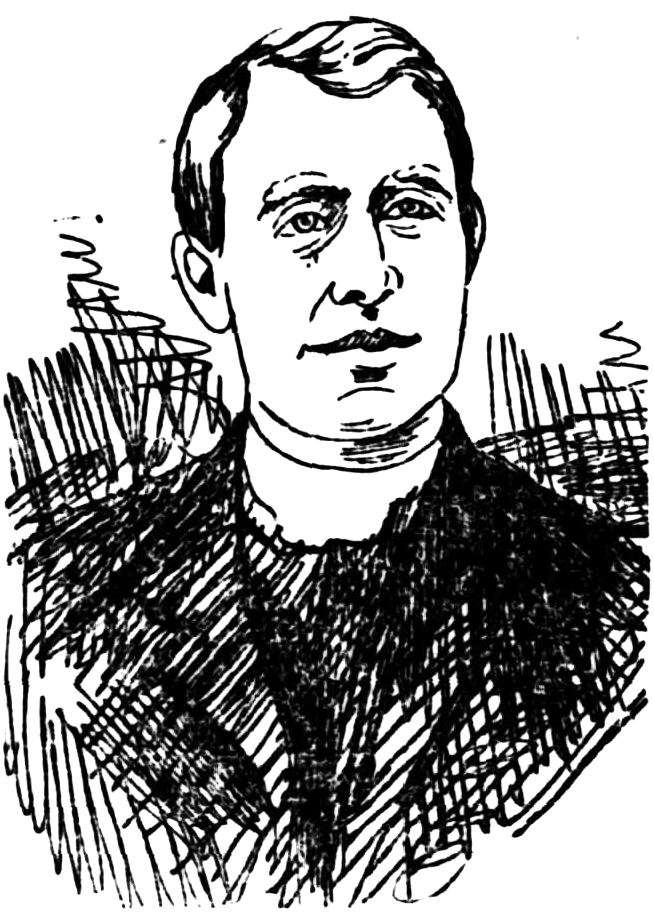
Rev. C. S. Hornabrook

Charles Soward Hornabrook (25 December 1859 – 25 September 1922), generally referred to as "C. S. Hornabrook" was an Anglican priest in the colony and State of South Australia, possibly best remembered for his work in Adelaide with St Mary Magdalene's Church and St Peter's College Mission, in Moore street, Adelaide.

== History ==
Hornabrook was born in Adelaide, the oldest son and second child of Charles Atkins Hornabrook JP (c. 1833 – 26 August 1903) and his wife Eliza Maria Hornabrook, née Soward, (c. 1838 – 26 January 1901). He was educated at St Peter's College and joined the architectural firm of Woods and McMinn, spending two years in England furthering his education at the Royal Academy architectural schools, during which time he wrote a monograph on the history of stained glass in England, read before the St George's Art Society and as Painted Glass published in The Furniture Gazette Vol. XXIII p. 135 London 1885. and was serialized in The Building News.

He then worked for two years as catechist under the Rev. R. H. Phillips, incumbent of St John's (Anglican) Church, Taree, New South Wales. In January 1887 he left Australia to study for Holy Orders at Lincoln Theological College, where he gained first class honours in the 1889 examinations. That same year he was ordained by Edward King, Bishop of Lincoln, and returned to Australia, and in November 1889 was sent to the Diocese of Newcastle, New South Wales.

In 1892 he returned to Adelaide as curate of St John's (Anglican) Church, serving mostly at St Mary Magdalene's mission church, 26–28 Moore Street (between Angas and Carrington streets.

In 1894 he was appointed rector of Christ Church, Kapunda. Ellen Benham was then headmistress of the Christ Church Day School before leaving to study in Europe. Hornabrook and Miss Day ran then ran the school. His duties included oversight of the Eudunda and Hamilton churches.

In November 1901 Hornabrook left for St Paul's Church, Port Adelaide, where he succeeded Archdeacon Samwell as rector, and remained there for four years. Rev. George Griffiths, of Willunga, was his replacement at Kapunda. He was appointed honorary canon in April 1904.

In 1905 Hornabrook left St Paul's, and was replaced in January 1906 by Archdeacon Young of Mount Gambier.

In 1906 he was granted a general licence in the Diocese of Adelaide for two years. He first visited England with his family, then assisted Archdeacon Dove at Walkerville.

In January 1908 Bishop Harmer appointed him Archdeacon of Mount Gambier, which diocese encompassed much of the South-East, including the Deanery of Strathalbyn. This appointment was not welcomed by Rev. A. G. King, rector of Christ Church, Mount Gambier, who resigned in protest. It irked him that the office should go to someone with no connection to the area when there was no shortage of qualified local men, though the real reason may have been Hornabrook's High Church orientation. This appointment, which was in the gift of the bishop, did not require him to spend much time in the South-East. Rather, he was given St Mary Magdalene's Church in Moore Street. He actively supported that church's Men's Bible Class, its Literary Society (member R. G. Lillywhite was president of the Literary Societies' Union), and fostered the formation of other groups, including three Boy Scout troops.

He was made a Canon in 1911.

In 1918 he succeeded Bishop Wilson as Archdeacon of Adelaide, the first native South Australian to hold that position.

St Peter's Mission

In 1908 St Peter's College followed the lead of similar public schools in England in establishing an outreach mission at St Mary Magdalene Church, Moore Street, city to benefit people in one of the poorer districts of Adelaide, and Hornabrook was appointed missioner. Hornabrook had a considerable influence on the architecture and fitting-out of the mission church, decidedly in the Anglo-Catholic mould.

Barwell Boys

In 1922 Premier Henry Barwell announced the "South Australian Farm Apprenticeship Scheme", when thousands of impoverished and orphaned English boys were brought in to relieve the shortage of farm labourers resulting from WWI casualties. A form of philanthropy, but also described as "more cheap labor", Hornabrook was at the forefront of assisting their settlement in the new country.

Ritualism

Hornabrook was criticised for his promotion of Anglo-Catholic vestments as adopted by the new headmaster of St Peter's College. Hornabrook (a member of the CBS) was accused, along with Canon Wise (both lecturers at St Barnabas' College) of turning the college into an institution for turning out High Church priests.

He died suddenly and unexpectedly, while still vigorous and active despite his 62 years of age. His remains were interred at the North Road Cemetery.

== Family ==
- Rev. Charles Soward Hornabrook (25 December 1859 – 25 September 1922) married Anna Elizabeth Johanna Newton ( – 5 September 1953) on 1 July 1891

- Harold Newton Hornabrook (1892–1951) married Mabel Parmenter ( – ) on 30 August 1919, lived in Tranmere, then Colac, Victoria

- Pamela Mary Hornabrook (1922– )
- Charles Parmenter Hornabrook (1923– )

- Lieut Leonard Charles Hornabrook (1895 – 21 May 1918) invalided out of RFC in WWI, joined Leicester Regiment, died in action from gas poisoning
- Dorothy Anna Hornabrook (1898– ) married Edward Arnold Van Senden in 1923
- Dr. R(eginald) Denys Hornabrook (1900– ) married Elinor Mary Constance Rutherford in 1928
- Jean Mary "Joan" Hornabrook (1904– )
